= Silver Meteor =

Amtrak service between New York and Florida

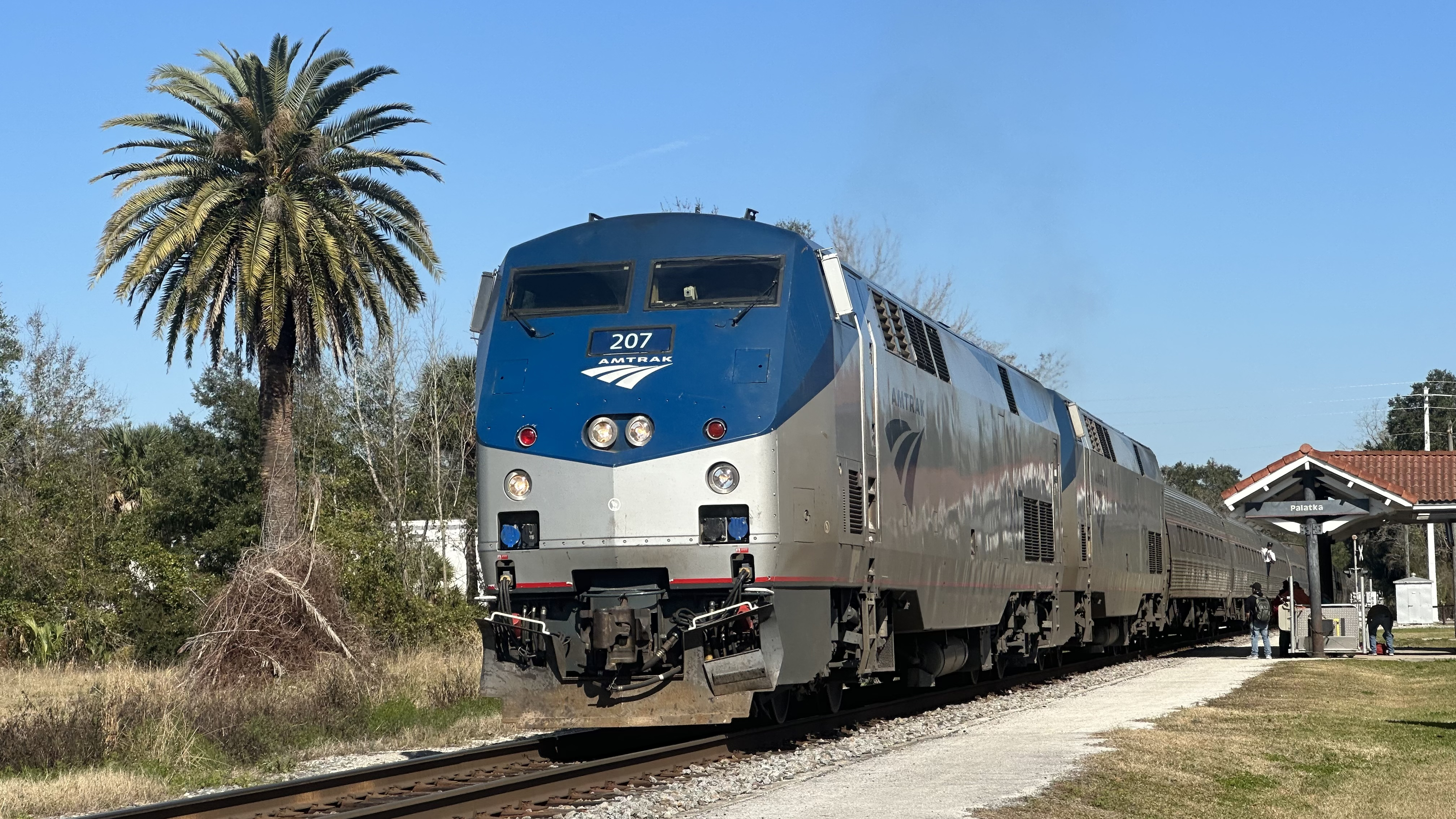
- The Silver Meteor arriving in Palatka, Florida in 2023

Overview
- Service type: Inter-city rail
- Locale: Eastern United States
- First service: February 2, 1939
- Current operator: Amtrak (1971–present)
- Former operators: Seaboard Air Line Railroad (1939–1967); Seaboard Coast Line Railroad (1967–1971); Pennsylvania Railroad (1939–1968, haulage agreement); Penn Central Transportation (1968–1971, haulage agreement)
- Annual ridership: 331,917 (FY 25) ▲11.3% (Note: Amtrak's Fiscal Year (FY) runs from October 1 of the prior year to September 30 of the named year.)

Route
- Termini: New York City, New York; Miami, Florida
- Stops: 33
- Distance travelled: 1,389 miles (2,235 km)
- Average journey time: 27 hours, 44 minutes
- Service frequency: Daily
- Train number: 97, 98

On-board services
- Classes: Coach Class; First Class Sleeper Service
- Disabled access: All train cars, all stations
- Sleeping arrangements: Roomette (2 beds); Bedroom (2 beds); Bedroom Suite (4 beds); Accessible Bedroom (2 beds)
- Catering facilities: Dining car, Café
- Baggage facilities: Overhead racks, checked baggage available at selected stations

Technical
- Rolling stock: Amfleet · Viewliner
- Track gauge: 4 ft 8 1/2 in (1,435 mm) standard gauge
- Operating speed: 50 mph (80 km/h) (avg.); 125 mph (201 km/h) (top)
- Track owners: Amtrak, CSXT, CFRC, SFRTA

The Silver Meteor is a long-distance passenger train operated by Amtrak between New York City and Miami, Florida. Introduced in 1939 as the first diesel-powered streamliner between New York and Florida, it was the flagship train of the Seaboard Air Line Railroad (SAL) and one of the flagship trains of its successor, the Seaboard Coast Line Railroad (SCL). The train was transferred to Amtrak when it took over intercity passenger rail service in 1971.

The train was part of Amtrak's Silver Service brand, along with its former sister train, the Silver Star, SAL's other former flagship streamliner. The two trains were the remnants of the numerous long-distance trains that operated between New York and Florida for most of the 20th century. On November 10, 2024, Amtrak temporarily combined the Capitol Limited and Silver Star, producing a Chicago–Washington–Miami route, the Floridian, leaving the Silver Meteor as the only remaining New York–Florida passenger train.

During fiscal year 2024, the Silver Meteor carried 298,328 passengers, an increase of 5.1% from FY2023.

== History ==
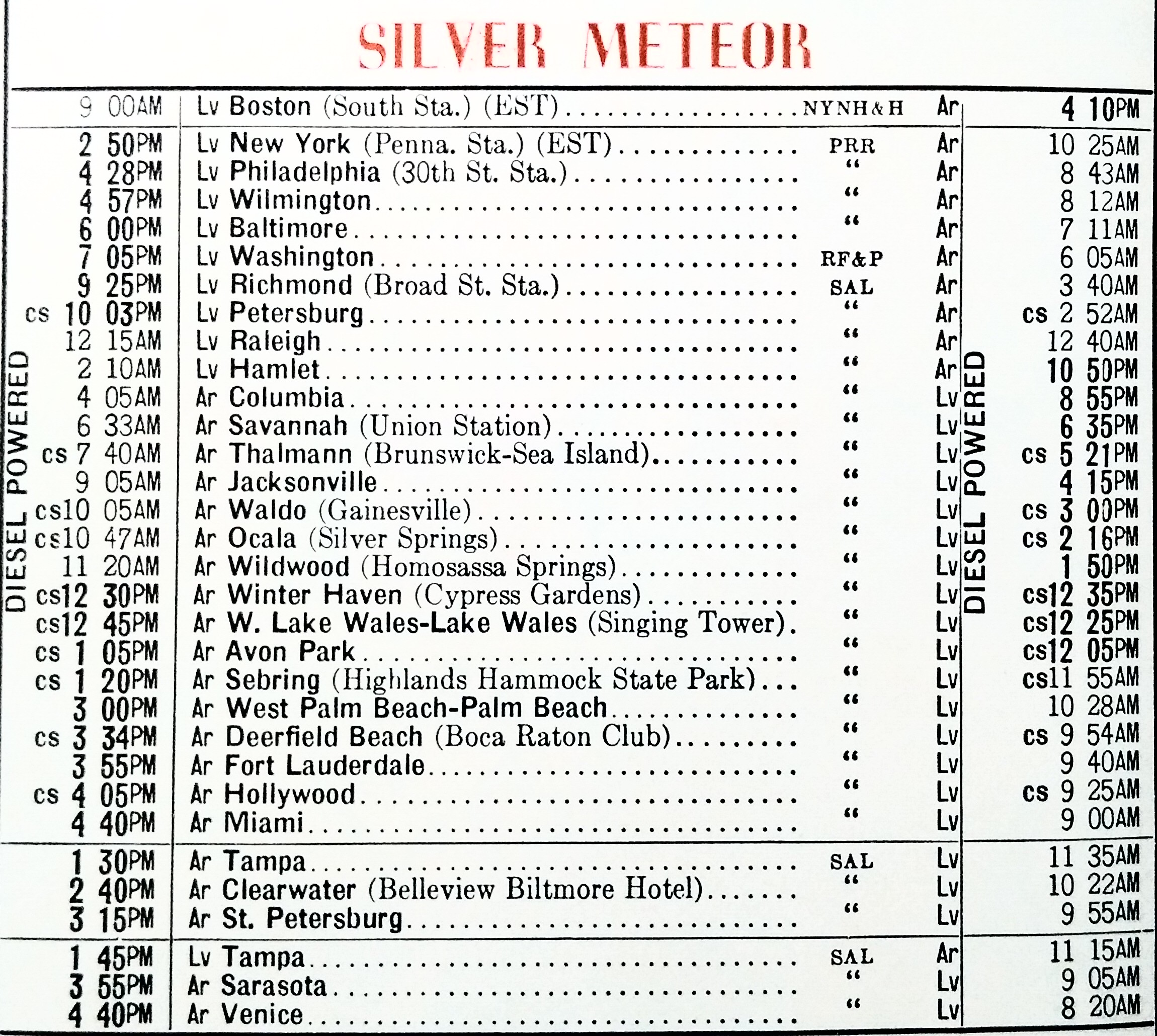
Silver Meteor 1961 SAL timetable

SAL's shrouded 4-6-2 Pacific locomotive #865 with the Silver Meteor's St. Petersburg section, in the 1940s

The Silver Meteor was inaugurated by the SAL on February 2, 1939. The name was selected via contest, with 30 people among 76,000 entrants proposing the winning name. Utilizing EMC E4 diesel locomotives originally purchased for SAL's flagship all-Pullman train, the Orange Blossom Special, it became the first diesel-powered streamliner to Florida. Its introduction later prompted SAL's competitor, the Atlantic Coast Line Railroad (ACL), to introduce its own New York-Florida streamliner, the Champion, on December 1, 1939. The SAL emphasized the train's modernity, referring to it as the "Train of Tomorrow" and having its first trip to Florida begin not from New York Penn Station, but from the Long Island Rail Road station at the 1939 New York World's Fair. The original schedule took 25 hours.

The train used seven new cars manufactured by the Budd Company: a baggage-dormitory-coach, a diner straddled by two coaches on either side, and a coach-lounge-observation. The train was originally tri-weekly, alternating service between Miami and St. Petersburg every other day. However, the train proved so popular that after delivering new equipment, SAL upgraded the train to daily operation on both coasts in December 1939. Heavyweight sleeping cars would be added to the train in 1941, and would be upgraded to lightweight sleeping cars in 1947. Also in 1947, the Silver Meteor upgraded its end-of-train lounge car to a Budd-built tavern-lounge-observation car. In 1956, SAL introduced the Sun Lounge to the train. These cars included five double-bedrooms on one end and a lounge with glass panels on the roof. This was because full dome cars could not fit through the tunnels on the Northeast Corridor between New York and Washington D.C.

The Pennsylvania Railroad carried the train from New York to Washington along its mainline—now the Northeast Corridor—under a haulage agreement. Between Washington and Richmond, Virginia, it used the Richmond, Fredericksburg and Potomac Railroad, jointly owned by the SAL and five other railroads. South of Richmond, the train used SAL's own mainline via Raleigh, North Carolina, Columbia, South Carolina, Savannah, Georgia, Jacksonville, Florida, and Ocala, Florida, and operated as train 57 southbound and train 58 northbound. At Wildwood, Florida, the train was split roughly in half into east and west coast sections. The east coast section continued to Miami and retained the tavern-observation car, and after 1956, the train's Sun Lounge. The west coast section continued to Tampa and eventually St. Petersburg, operating as trains 157 southbound and 158 northbound. At Tampa, the train would be split again, with a small section containing a coach and a sleeper continuing to Venice via Sarasota as train 257 southbound and 258 northbound. This section's small consist is primarily because from the mid-50s through June 1967, the Venice section was usually handled by SAL Motorcar 2028.

The Seaboard Air Line Railroad merged with the Atlantic Coast Line Railroad to form the Seaboard Coast Line Railroad in 1967, and in 1968 the new railroad reshuffled the Florida streamliners. The Silver Meteor lost its west coast section and began serving Miami only. The Pennsylvania Railroad merged with the New York Central Railroad to form Penn Central Transportation in 1968, which inherited the longstanding haulage agreement for the Silver Meteor. Amtrak retained the train when it took over most intercity passenger trains on May 1, 1971.

=== Amtrak era ===
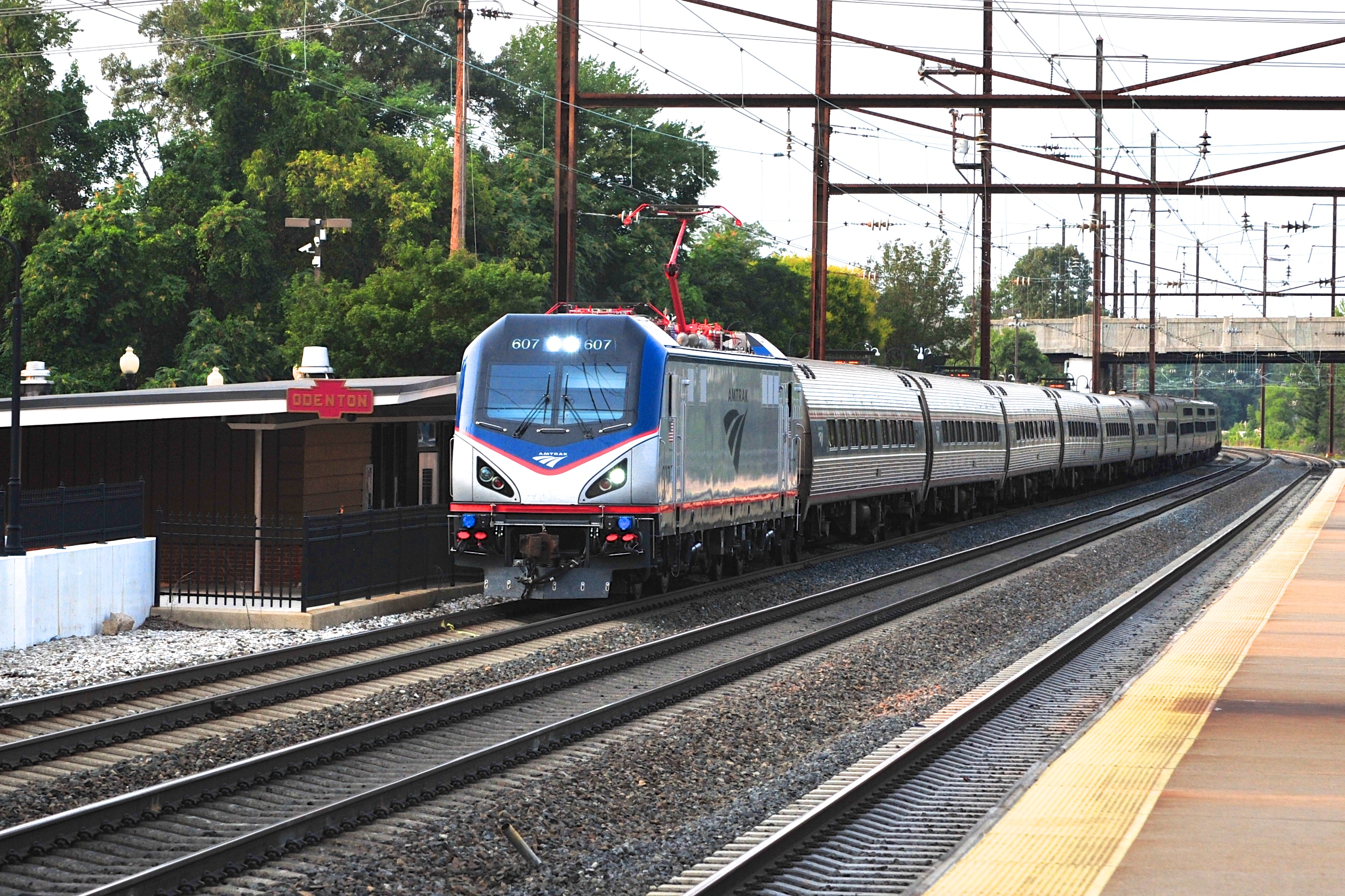
The Silver Meteor passing through Odenton, Maryland in 2014.

From December 17, 1971, to April 15, 1972, and September 10, 1972, to April 27, 1973, the Silver Meteor bypassed Jacksonville, running over the Gross Cutoff between Gross near the Georgia state line and Baldwin. Between November 14, 1971, and January 16, 1972, the Silver Meteor made a major shift in its route, shifting from its traditional path on the old SAL mainline via Raleigh and Columbia to the old ACL mainline through Florence and Charleston, South Carolina. Between June 11 and September 10, 1972, the Silver Meteor was extended to Boston and called the Meteor. Service to St. Petersburg returned with the train splitting at Auburndale, Florida.

On several occasions during the 1970s, the Silver Meteor was combined with the Champion, the main rival of the Silver Meteor until the SCL merger. In the summer of 1972, Amtrak split the trains in Savannah, with the Champion continuing to St. Petersburg and the Meteor continuing to Miami. They were combined again for the summers of 1975, 1976, and 1977, splitting in Jacksonville. Finally, in 1979, the Champion was permanently consolidated into the Silver Meteor as its St. Petersburg section. Although the Champion name was preserved for a time, it disappeared with the October 1, 1979, timetable.

On September 30, 1979, the Silver Meteor was rerouted between Savannah and Jacksonville over the former Atlantic Coast Line Railroad route due to the abandonment of the old SAL route. On January 31, 1984, the Silver Meteor's Florida west coast terminus was cut back from St. Petersburg to Tampa, ending almost 100 years of rail passenger service to St. Petersburg. By October 26, 1986, the Silver Meteor had shifted to the old ACL route north of Savannah, as the abandonment of the SAL route north of Raleigh affected only the Silver Star. On June 11, 1988, the tracks between Coleman and Auburndale, Florida were abandoned, then removed to create the General James A. Van Fleet State Trail, shifting the Miami section west to Lakeland.

By the end of 1988, the Silver Meteor's Miami section had train numbers 97 and 98, while the Tampa section had train numbers 87 and 88. The Tampa section (87 and 88) was discontinued in 1994, and the Miami section (97 and 98) was rerouted through Orlando, and are still used today.

The best timing for Amtrak's Silver Meteor between Miami and New York City was 27 hours in 2008; SAL's first edition took 25 hours in 1939. Late trains often add more hours to today's schedules, most often caused by freight delays.

In the January 2011 issue of Trains Magazine, this route was listed as one of five routes to be looked at by Amtrak in FY 2011, as the previous five routes (Sunset, Eagle, Zephyr, Capitol, and Cardinal) were examined in FY 2010.

In October 2019, the Silver Meteor's dining car discontinued serving freshly cooked meals in a traditional, restaurant-style setting, otherwise known as "traditional dining." Amtrak introduced the "flexible dining" system to the Silver Meteor, which includes pre-prepared meals heated in either a convection oven or a microwave oven at the time of purchase. In a Rail Passengers Association webinar that took place on November 16, 2022, Amtrak's vice president of long-distance service revealed that traditional dining service was planned to be reintroduced on the Silver Meteor and the Silver Star in early 2023. Following this announcement, beginning on northbound train 92 on March 15, 2023, traditional dining was reintroduced to the Silver Star in the form of a 3-month pilot program gauged to test the success of the service. Southbound train 91 received the pilot on March 17. On June 24, 2023, traditional dining service was formally launched on the Silver Meteor on northbound train 98, and the pilot program on the Silver Star was replaced by a permanent service. Southbound train 97 received traditional dining on June 26. However, coach passengers were not allowed access to the dining car on either the Silver Meteor or Silver Star, unlike on Amtrak's western long-distance trains. Shortly after the formal rollout in another interview with the Rail Passengers Association, Amtrak's vice president of long-distance service stated that Coach Class access to the dining car was planned to be allowed by the end of 2023, however by January 2024 coach passengers still did not have access. On March 4, 2024, dining car access was finally expanded to coach passengers, mirroring service on Amtrak's western long-distance trains.

Since 2012, issues have prevented Amtrak from moving from their current station to the Miami Intermodal Center (MIC), primarily regarding the length of the platforms and lease agreements. Amtrak argued that the platforms were insufficient in length, as extra cars are normally added to the Silver Meteor and Silver Star during the winter season to accommodate increased demand. Tri-Rail began serving the MIC on April 5, 2015, and Greyhound began using the station on June 24, 2015. Amtrak had been expected to move to the MIC by the Fall of 2016, but in 2018 Amtrak rejected the terms of a lease agreement with FDOT and said it had no plans to move to the MIC. In 2021, Amtrak reached out to FDOT to begin negotiations again for utilization of the MIC, and in February 2022, negotiations officially restarted. Later in March 2022, a test train operated into and out of the station and proved that the platforms are sufficient in length to hold a standard 10 car train. However, the platforms are not long enough to accommodate an 11 to 12 car train, which could be possible in the winter months. In September 2022, Amtrak management announced that it had restarted lease negotiations with FDOT regarding the use and maintenance of the terminal. However, one issue is the deadheading move that will need to occur between the MIC and Hialeah. Amtrak CEO Stephen Gardner stated, "The company is evaluating technical and operational aspects of the move." In an Amtrak Public Board Meeting Q&A on December 1, 2022, it was revealed that Amtrak was in the final stages of its preparations for relocating from their current Miami station, and had planned to relocate to the MIC in 2023. However, additional track area would need to be constructed for the Amtrak trains to turn back north, and by 2024 Amtrak had no date indicated for when service will start at the MIC. Amtrak then unexpectedly reversed course in December 2024, sending a short letter to transportation officials negotiating the station lease's final details. The letter said Amtrak was no longer interested in running trains to the station and had determined that operating its trains from the station would be too expensive.

On November 10, 2024, the Silver Star was merged with the Capitol Limited as the Chicago–Washington–Miami Floridian, leaving the Silver Meteor as the only New York City–Miami route.

=== COVID-19 pandemic ===
On July 6, 2020, Amtrak reduced the frequency of this train to four times per week as opposed to daily due to the impact of ridership from the worldwide COVID-19 Coronavirus pandemic. Southbound Silver Meteor trains departed New York Monday through Thursday, while Silver Star trains departed Friday through Sunday. Similarly, northbound Silver Meteor trains departed Miami Sunday through Wednesday, while Silver Star trains departed Miami on Thursday through Saturday. Both trains resumed daily services on June 7, 2021, after additional Amtrak funding was included in the American Rescue Plan Act of 2021.

From January 24 to October 14, 2022, the Silver Meteor was suspended due to the Omicron variant surge of the coronavirus pandemic and its effect on staffing and equipment availability. During this period, the Silver Meteor's sister train, the Silver Star, continued to operate. Additional coach and sleeping car capacity was added to the Silver Star, creating a train that carried as many as six coaches and five sleepers. During this period, the Silver Star provided once-daily service to stations normally served by trains between New York and Rocky Mount, NC, and Savannah and Miami. Furthermore, a stop was temporarily added at Jesup, Georgia, usually only served by the Silver Meteor. Once-daily service remained available to Silver Meteor stations between Rocky Mount, North Carolina and Savannah via the daily daytime Palmetto, which operates between New York and Savannah. The Silver Meteor's resumption date was pushed back a total of six times. Originally scheduled to return on March 27, it was pushed back to May 23, September 11, and finally, October 3. However, Hurricane Ian caused extensive damage to the Central Florida Rail Corridor in late September, which Amtrak uses to get to central and southern Florida. In response, Amtrak pushed the suspension back to October 6, then to October 11, and finally to October 14 after the full extent of the damage became apparent.

== Equipment ==
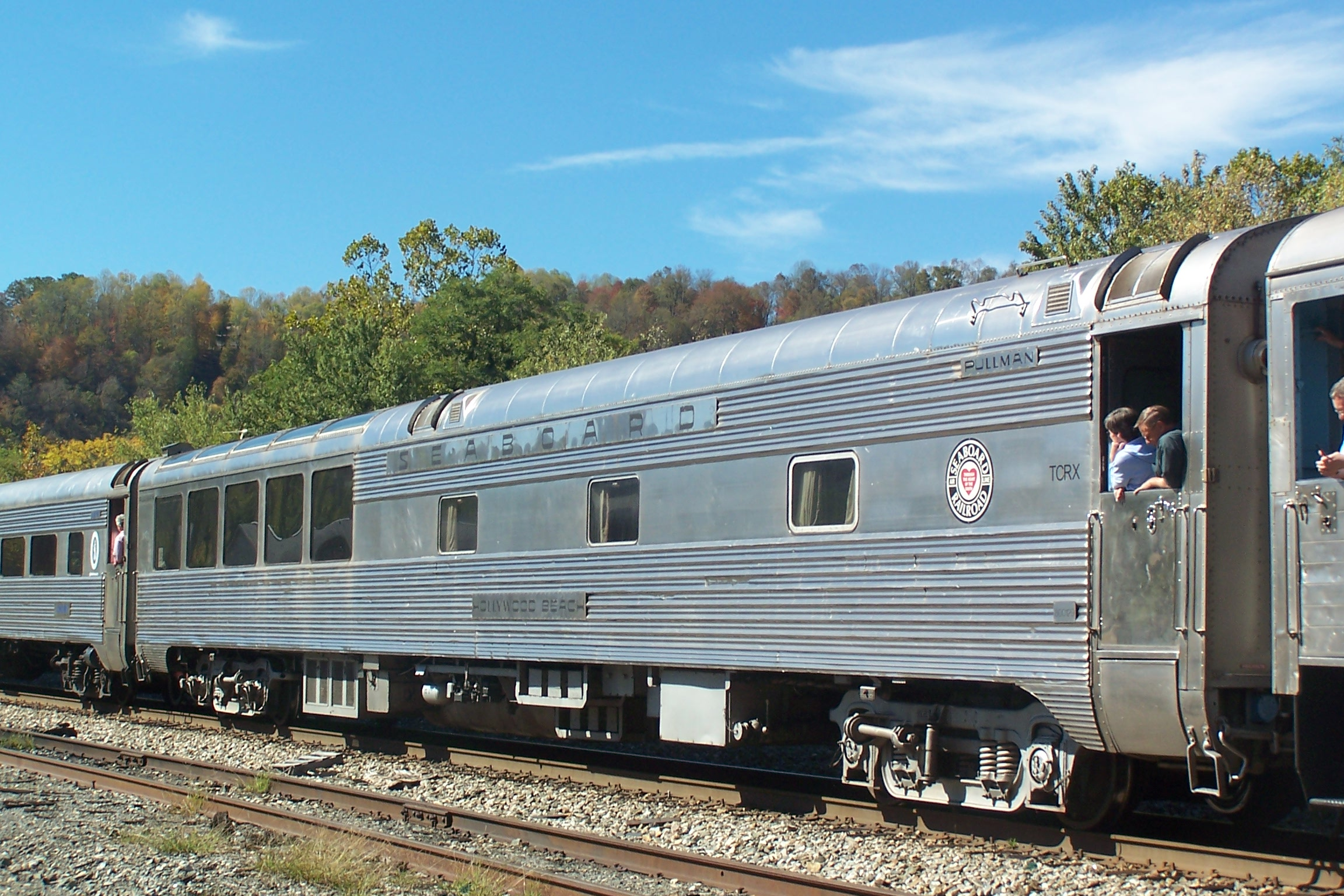
Seaboard Air Line Railroad (SAL) glass-roofed "Sun Lounge" Hollywood Beach, a 5-double-bedroom-bar-lounge Pullman car introduced in 1956. Regular dome cars were too high for the tunnel clearances on the Northeast Corridor used by SAL trains north of Washington.

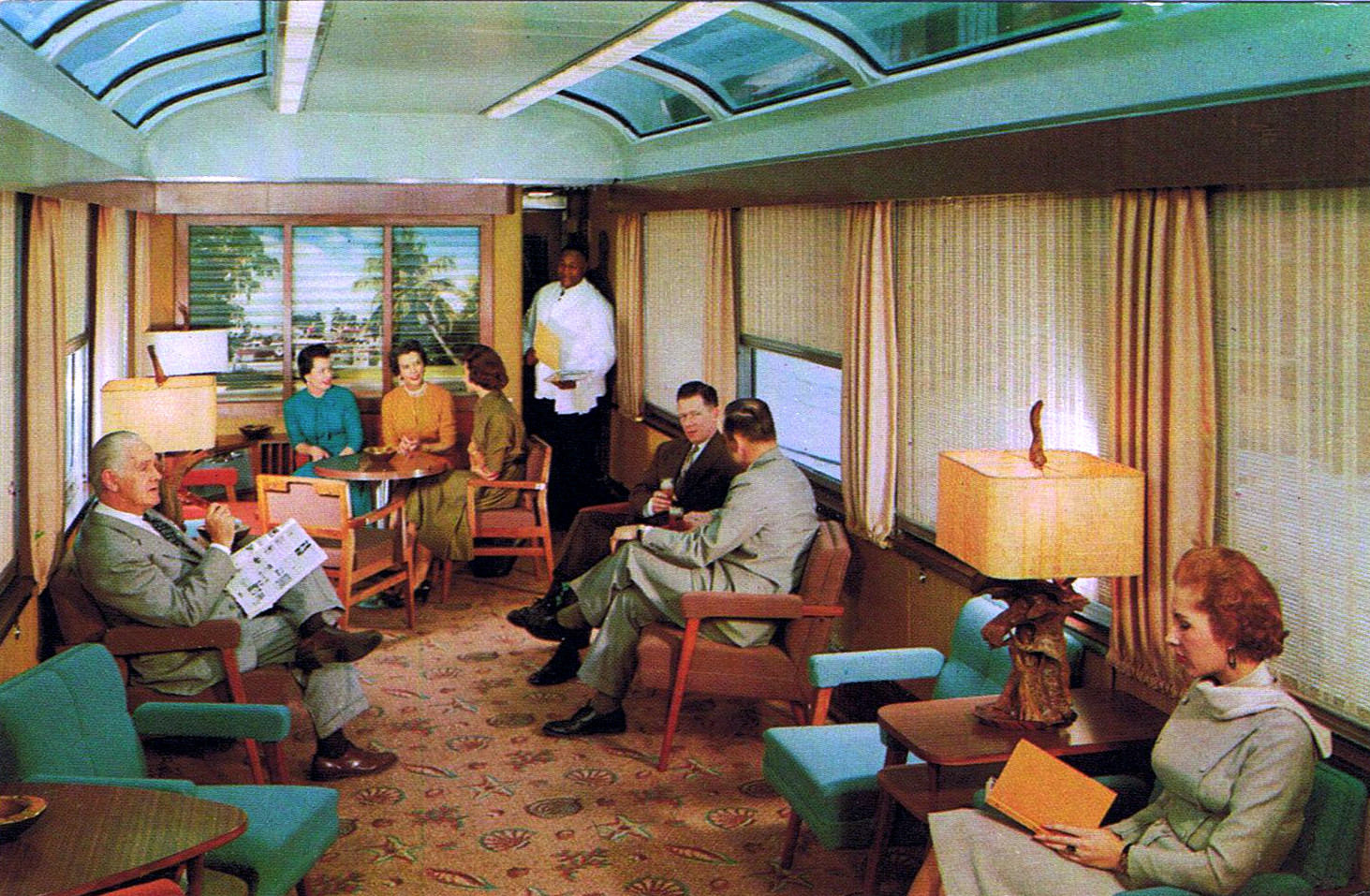
Interior of the "Sun Lounge"

The original Silver Meteor used lightweight cars built by the Budd Company. Three consists were needed for a daily train between New York and Miami; each had a baggage-dormitory-coach (22 seats), three 60-seat coaches, a tavern-lounge-coach (30 seats), a dining car, and a coach-observation-lounge (48 seats). The Pennsylvania Railroad owned some of the coaches. Budd delivered more cars in November–December 1940, allowing daily service to St. Petersburg: three baggage-dormitory-coaches (18 seats), seven 56-seat coaches, two dining cars, and three coach-buffet-observation cars (30 seats).

By the early 1960s, the SAL's Silver Meteor typically had 17 cars or more, consisting of nine Pullman sleeping cars, including its highly touted glass-topped Sun Lounge introduced in 1956, several coaches, two dining cars, and an observation car with a tavern and lounge. The train began using rebuilt Heritage Fleet equipment in 1981.

The Silver Meteor now uses Amtrak's standard long-distance single-level equipment: Viewliner baggage cars, Viewliner sleeping cars, Viewliner dining cars, Amfleet café-lounges and Amfleet coaches. An ACS-64 electric locomotive is used between New York City and Washington, D.C., while two diesel-electric locomotives, either GE P42DC or Siemens ALC-42 locomotives, are used for power south of Washington, D.C. Amtrak began replacing the older P42DC locomotives with ALC-42 locomotives in 2023.

A typical Silver Meteor consist as of January 2025 is made up of:

- ACS-64 locomotive (New York–Washington)
- P42DC or ALC-42 locomotive (Washington–Miami)
- P42DC or ALC-42 locomotive (Washington–Miami)
- Amfleet II Coach
- Amfleet II Coach
- Amfleet II Coach
- Amfleet II Coach
- Amfleet II Café/Lounge Car
- Viewliner II Dining Car
- Viewliner I/II Sleeping Car
- Viewliner I/II Sleeping Car
- Viewliner I/II Sleeping Car
- Viewliner II Baggage Car

== Route details ==
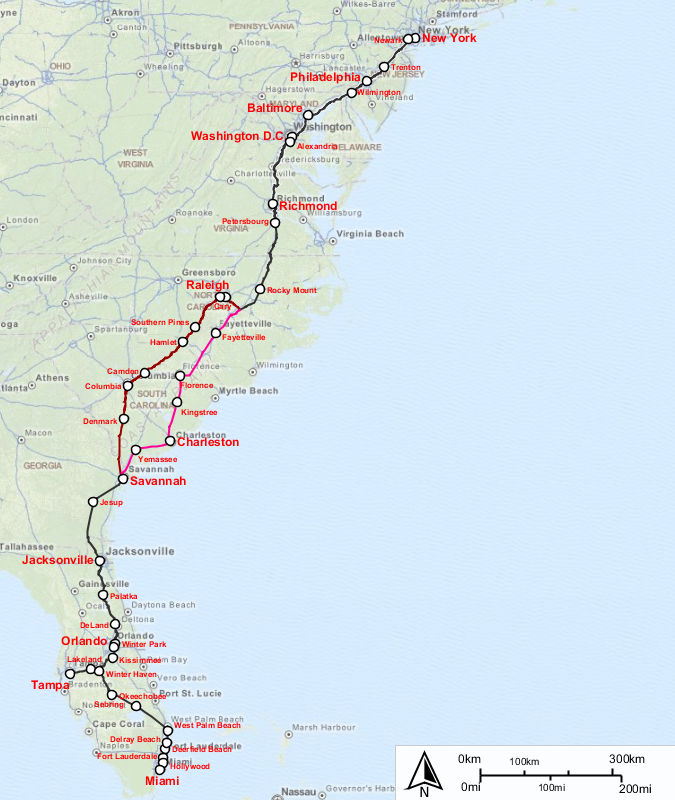
Amtrak Silver Service route map prior to 2024

The Silver Meteor operates over a combination of Amtrak and CSX Transportation trackage:

- New York – Washington D.C. (Amtrak)
  - Northeast Corridor:
- Washington D.C. – DeLand, Florida (CSXT)
  - RF&P Subdivision
  - Richmond Terminal Subdivision
  - North End Subdivision
  - South End Subdivision
  - Charleston Subdivision
  - Savannah Subdivision
  - Nahunta Subdivision
  - Jacksonville Terminal Subdivision
  - Sanford Subdivision
- DeLand - Poinciana, Florida (SunRail)
  - Central Florida Rail Corridor
- Poinciana - Mangonia Park, Florida (CSXT)
  - Carters Subdivision
  - Auburndale Subdivision
  - Miami Subdivision
- Mangonia Park - Miami, Florida (Tri-Rail)
  - South Florida Rail Corridor

The Silver Meteor uses the same route as the Floridian between Washington and Miami save for two segments: Selma, North Carolina – Savannah, Georgia, and Kissimmee, Florida – Winter Haven, Florida. Between Selma and Savannah, the Floridian travels inland over the CSX S-Line to serve the Carolinas' state capitals of Raleigh and Columbia, while the Silver Meteor travels closer to the coast on the CSX A-Line and serves Fayetteville, North Carolina and Charleston, South Carolina. Between Kissimmee and Winter Haven, the Silver Meteor turns south to go directly to Miami at Auburndale, Florida, while the Floridian continues west to Lakeland, Florida and Tampa before coming back to Auburndale and turning south to Miami. In addition to these diversions, between Sebring, Florida and West Palm Beach, Florida, the Silver Meteor makes no intermediate stops, while the Floridian makes an additional stop at Okeechobee, Florida. Inversely, between Savannah and Jacksonville, Florida, the Silver Meteor makes an additional stop at Jesup, Georgia, while the Floridian makes no intermediate stops. The daytime Palmetto operates from New York to Savannah over the same route as the Silver Meteor, allowing cities in the Carolinas and Virginia on the route of the Silver Meteor to have service during the day.

In its present form, the southbound Silver Meteor leaves New York in mid-afternoon, arriving in Washington at dinner time and traveling overnight through Virginia and the Carolinas for arrival at breakfast time the following morning in Savannah, rush hour in Jacksonville, lunchtime in Orlando, and early evening in Miami. Northbound trains leave Miami just before rush hour, arriving in central Florida at lunchtime and Jacksonville in the late afternoon and dinner time in Savannah, then passing through the Carolinas and Virginia overnight for arrival at breakfast-time in Washington, mid-morning in Philadelphia and lunchtime in New York.

Like other long-distance trains operating on the Northeast Corridor, local travel between NEC stations is prohibited on the Silver Meteor. Northbound trains only stop to discharge passengers from Alexandria, Virginia northward, and southbound trains only stop to receive passengers from Newark, New Jersey to Washington. This policy is in place to keep seats available for passengers making more extended trips. Passengers wanting to travel locally must use the more frequent Northeast Regional or Acela trains. Additionally, the Silver Meteor, like the Floridian, does not allow local travel between West Palm Beach and Miami. Southbound trains only discharge passengers, while northbound trains only stop to receive passengers bound for points beyond West Palm Beach. This is due to the availability of Tri-Rail, South Florida's commuter rail system.

== Stations ==
| State | Town/City | Station | Connections |
|---|---|---|---|
| New York | New York City | New York; Penn Station | Amtrak (long-distance): Cardinal, Crescent, Lake Shore Limited, Palmetto; Amtrak (intercity): Acela, Adirondack, Berkshire Flyer, Carolinian, Empire Service, Ethan Allen Express, Keystone Service, Maple Leaf, Northeast Regional, Pennsylvanian, Vermonter; LIRR: ■ City Terminal Zone, ■ Port Washington Branch; NJ Transit: ■ North Jersey Coast Line, ■ Northeast Corridor Line, ■ Gladstone Branch, ■ Montclair–Boonton Line, ■ Morristown Line; NYC Subway: PATH: HOB-33 JSQ-33 JSQ-33 (via HOB); MTA Bus; Intercity bus: FlixBus |
| New Jersey | Newark | Newark; Penn Station | Amtrak: Acela, Cardinal, Carolinian, Crescent, Keystone Service, Northeast Regional, Palmetto, Pennsylvanian, Vermonter; NJ Transit: ■ North Jersey Coast Line, ■ Northeast Corridor Line, ■ Raritan Valley Line; PATH: NWK-WTC; Newark Light Rail; NJ Transit Bus; Intercity bus: Greyhound, FlixBus |
| New Jersey | Trenton | Trenton | Amtrak: Cardinal, Carolinian, Crescent, Keystone Service, Northeast Regional, Palmetto, Pennsylvanian, Vermonter; NJ Transit: ■ Northeast Corridor Line, ■ River Line; SEPTA Regional Rail: ■ Trenton Line; NJ Transit Bus, SEPTA Suburban Bus |
| Pennsylvania | Philadelphia | 30th Street Station | Amtrak: Acela, Cardinal, Carolinian, Crescent, Keystone Service, Northeast Regional, Palmetto, Pennsylvanian, Vermonter; SEPTA Regional Rail: all routes NJ Transit: ■ Atlantic City Line; SEPTA Metro: SEPTA City Bus, SEPTA Suburban Bus, NJ Transit Bus; Intercity bus: Martz Trailways |
| Delaware | Wilmington | Wilmington | Amtrak: Acela, Cardinal, Carolinian, Crescent, Northeast Regional, Palmetto, Vermonter; SEPTA Regional Rail: ■ Wilmington/Newark Line; DART First State; Intercity bus: Greyhound Lines |
| Maryland | Baltimore | Penn Station | Amtrak: Acela, Cardinal, Carolinian, Crescent, Northeast Regional, Palmetto, Vermonter; MARC: ■ Penn Line; Light RailLink; MTA Maryland, Charm City Circulator |
| District of Columbia | Washington | Washington; Union Station | Amtrak: Acela, Cardinal, Carolinian, Crescent, Floridian, Northeast Regional, Palmetto, Vermonter, Amtrak Thruway to Charlottesville, Virginia; MARC: ■ Brunswick Line, ■ Camden Line, ■ Penn Line; VRE: ■ Manassas Line, ■ Fredericksburg Line; Metro: Red Line; Metrobus, MTA Maryland, Loudoun County Transit, OmniRide; Intercity bus: Greyhound, BestBus, FlixBus, Peter Pan, OurBus |
| Virginia | Alexandria | Alexandria | Amtrak: Cardinal, Carolinian, Crescent, Floridian, Northeast Regional, Palmetto; VRE: ■ Fredericksburg Line, ■ Manassas Line; Metro: Blue Line, Yellow Line; Metrobus, DASH |
| Virginia | Fredericksburg | Fredericksburg | Amtrak: Carolinian, Northeast Regional; VRE: ■ Fredericksburg Line; Fredericksburg Regional Transit |
| Virginia | Richmond | Richmond; Staples Mill Road | Amtrak: Carolinian, Floridian, Northeast Regional, Palmetto, Amtrak Thruway to Charlottesville, Virginia; Greater Richmond Transit Company |
| Virginia | Ettrick | Petersburg | Amtrak: Carolinian, Floridian, Northeast Regional, Palmetto |
| North Carolina | Rocky Mount | Rocky Mount | Amtrak: Carolinian, Floridian, Palmetto; Tar River Transit; Intercity bus: Greyhound Lines |
| North Carolina | Fayetteville | Fayetteville | Amtrak: Palmetto |
| South Carolina | Florence | Florence | Amtrak: Palmetto |
| South Carolina | Kingstree | Kingstree | Amtrak: Palmetto |
| South Carolina | North Charleston | North Charleston | Amtrak: Palmetto; Charleston Area Regional Transportation Authority, Southeastern Stages |
| South Carolina | Yemassee | Yemassee | Amtrak: Palmetto |
| Georgia | Savannah | Savannah | Amtrak: Floridian, Palmetto |
| Georgia | Jesup | Jesup | |
| Florida | Jacksonville | Jacksonville | Amtrak: Floridian, Amtrak Thruway to Waldo, Ocala, Gainesville, The Villages, Wildwood, Dade City, Lakeland; JTA Bus |
| Florida | Palatka | Palatka | Amtrak: Floridian; The Ride Solution |
| Florida | DeLand | DeLand | Amtrak: Floridian, Amtrak Thruway to Daytona Beach; SunRail; Votran |
| Florida | Winter Park | Winter Park | Amtrak: Floridian; SunRail; LYNX Bus |
| Florida | Orlando | Orlando | Amtrak: Floridian, Amtrak Thruway to Lakeland, Tampa, St. Petersburg, Bradenton, Sarasota, Port Charlotte, Fort Myers; SunRail; LYNX Bus |
| Florida | Kissimmee | Kissimmee | Amtrak: Floridian; SunRail; LYNX Bus; Intercity bus: Greyhound Lines |
| Florida | Winter Haven | Winter Haven | Amtrak: Floridian |
| Florida | Sebring | Sebring | Amtrak: Floridian |
| Florida | West Palm Beach | West Palm Beach | Amtrak: Floridian; Tri-Rail; Brightline (at West Palm Beach); Palm Tran, Tri-Rail Commuter Connector, West Palm Beach Downtown Trolley; Intercity bus: Greyhound Lines |
| Florida | Delray Beach | Delray Beach | Amtrak: Floridian; Tri-Rail; Palm Tran, Downtown Connector |
| Florida | Deerfield Beach | Deerfield Beach | Amtrak: Floridian; Tri-Rail; Broward County Transit, Tri-Rail Commuter Connector |
| Florida | Fort Lauderdale | Fort Lauderdale | Amtrak: Floridian; Tri-Rail; Broward County Transit, Metrobus, Sun Trolley, Tri-Rail Commuter Connector |
| Florida | Hollywood | Hollywood | Amtrak: Floridian; Tri-Rail; Broward County Transit, Hallandale Beach Community Bus |
| Florida | Miami | Miami | Amtrak: Floridian; Metrobus |

== See also ==
- Champion
