= Silver Star (Amtrak train) =

Former Amtrak service between New York and Florida

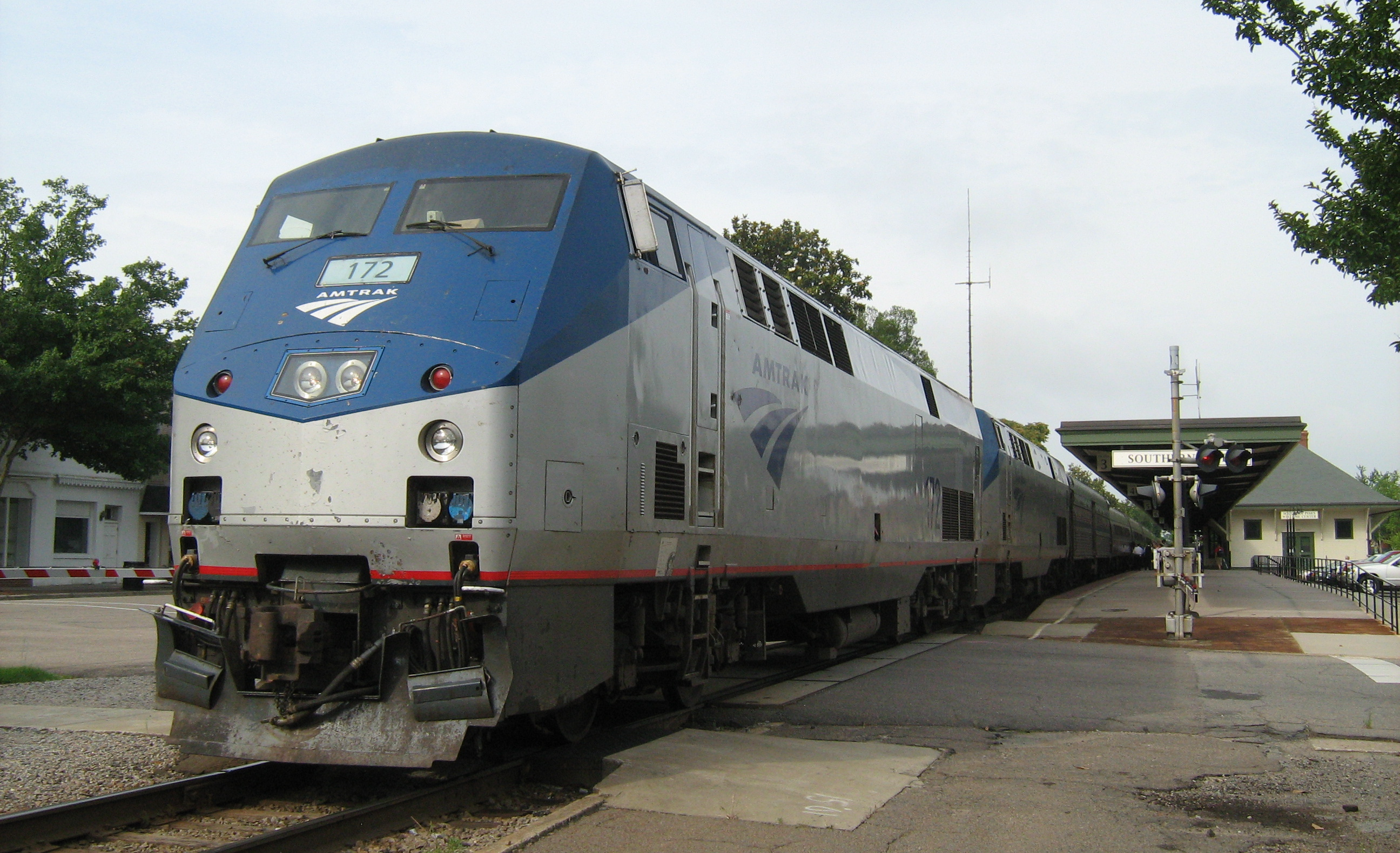
- The Silver Star at Southern Pines, North Carolina, in 2009

Overview
- Service type: Inter-city rail
- Status: Temporarily merged into the Floridian
- Locale: East Coast of the United States
- First service: December 12, 1947
- Last service: November 9, 2024
- Former operators: Amtrak (May 1, 1971 – November 9, 2024); Seaboard Air Line Railroad (December 12, 1947 - June 30, 1967); Seaboard Coast Line Railroad (July 1, 1967 - April 30, 1971); Pennsylvania Railroad (December 12, 1947 - January 31, 1968, haulage agreement); Penn Central Transportation (February 1, 1968 - April 30, 1971, haulage agreement)
- Annual ridership: 38,138 (FY 25) (Note: Route suspended November 2024.) ▼ -90.2% (Note: Amtrak's Fiscal Year (FY) runs from October 1 of the prior year to September 30 of the named year.)

Route
- Termini: New York City; Miami
- Stops: 38
- Distance travelled: 1,522 miles (2,449 km)
- Average journey time: 31h 33m
- Service frequency: Daily
- Train number: 91, 92

On-board services
- Classes: Coach Class; Sleeper Service
- Disabled access: All train cars, all stations
- Sleeping arrangements: Roomette (2 beds); Bedroom (2 beds); Bedroom Suite (4 beds); Accessible Bedroom (2 beds)
- Catering facilities: Dining car, Café
- Baggage facilities: Overhead racks, checked baggage available at selected stations

Technical
- Rolling stock: Amfleet, Viewliner, GE Genesis, ACS-64, GE Dash 8-32BWH
- Track gauge: 4 ft 8 1/2 in (1,435 mm) standard gauge
- Operating speed: 125 mph (201 km/h) (top, NEC) 79 mph (127 km/h) (top)
- Track owners: Amtrak, CSXT, NS, CFRC, SFRTA

The Silver Star is a temporarily suspended long-distance passenger train operated by Amtrak on a 1,522-mile (2,449 km) route between New York City and Miami via Washington, D.C.; Richmond, Virginia; Raleigh, North Carolina; Columbia, South Carolina; Savannah, Georgia; Jacksonville, Florida; and Tampa, Florida.

The Silver Star and its sister train in the Silver Service brand, the Silver Meteor, are the descendants of numerous long-distance trains that operated between Florida and New York for most of the 20th century. On November 10, 2024, Amtrak temporarily combined the Capitol Limited and Silver Star, producing a Chicago-Washington–Miami route, the Floridian.

During fiscal year 2023, the Silver Star carried 351,732 passengers, a decrease of 19.1% from FY2022. In November 2023, the train had a total revenue of $8.7 million.

== History ==
=== Background ===
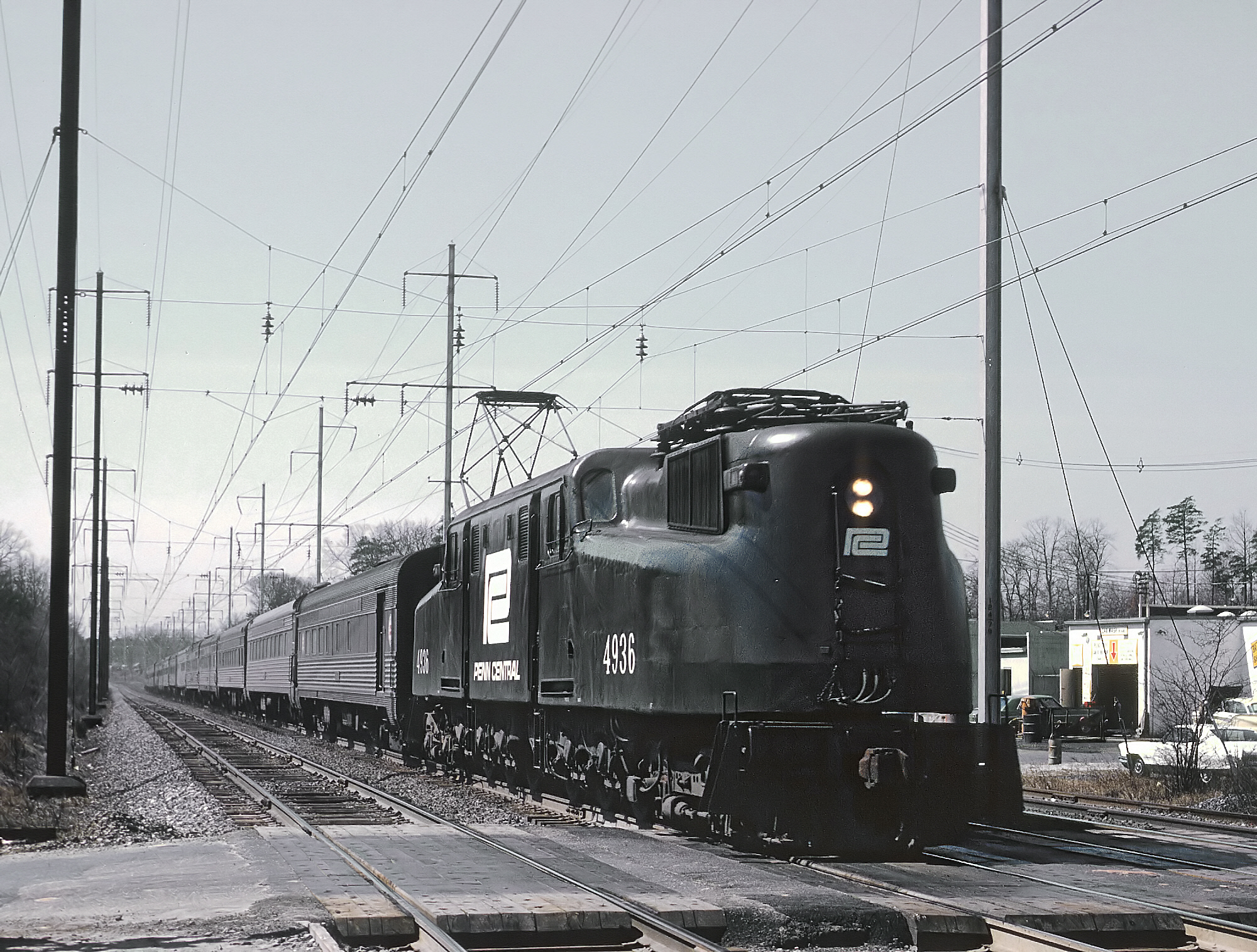
The northbound Silver Star passing through Seabrook, Maryland in 1969

The Silver Star was originally a service of the Seaboard Air Line Railroad (SAL), running from New York to Miami and later also St. Petersburg (beyond Tampa). It was previously known as the Advance Silver Meteor, and was renamed on December 12, 1947, after the name was chosen by SAL in a contest. From 1947 to 1948, it was winter-only and did not appear in summer timetables. By 1949, however, it was a year-round train. Its main Miami-bound route went through the interior of Florida, via Ocala and Winter Haven. In peak winter service in the mid-1950s it had a section that went to St. Petersburg via Tampa. Another section went to Port Boca Grande via Tampa. The Pennsylvania Railroad (PRR) carried the train between New York and Washington, D.C. under a haulage agreement, similar to the arrangement with its sister train, the Silver Meteor. The agreement was maintained when the PRR was folded into Penn Central Transportation in 1968, a year after SAL merged with the Atlantic Coast Line Railroad (ACL) to form the Seaboard Coast Line Railroad (SCL). Between Washington and Richmond, Virginia, the train operated on RF&P rails. Amtrak took over the train in 1971.

=== Amtrak era ===
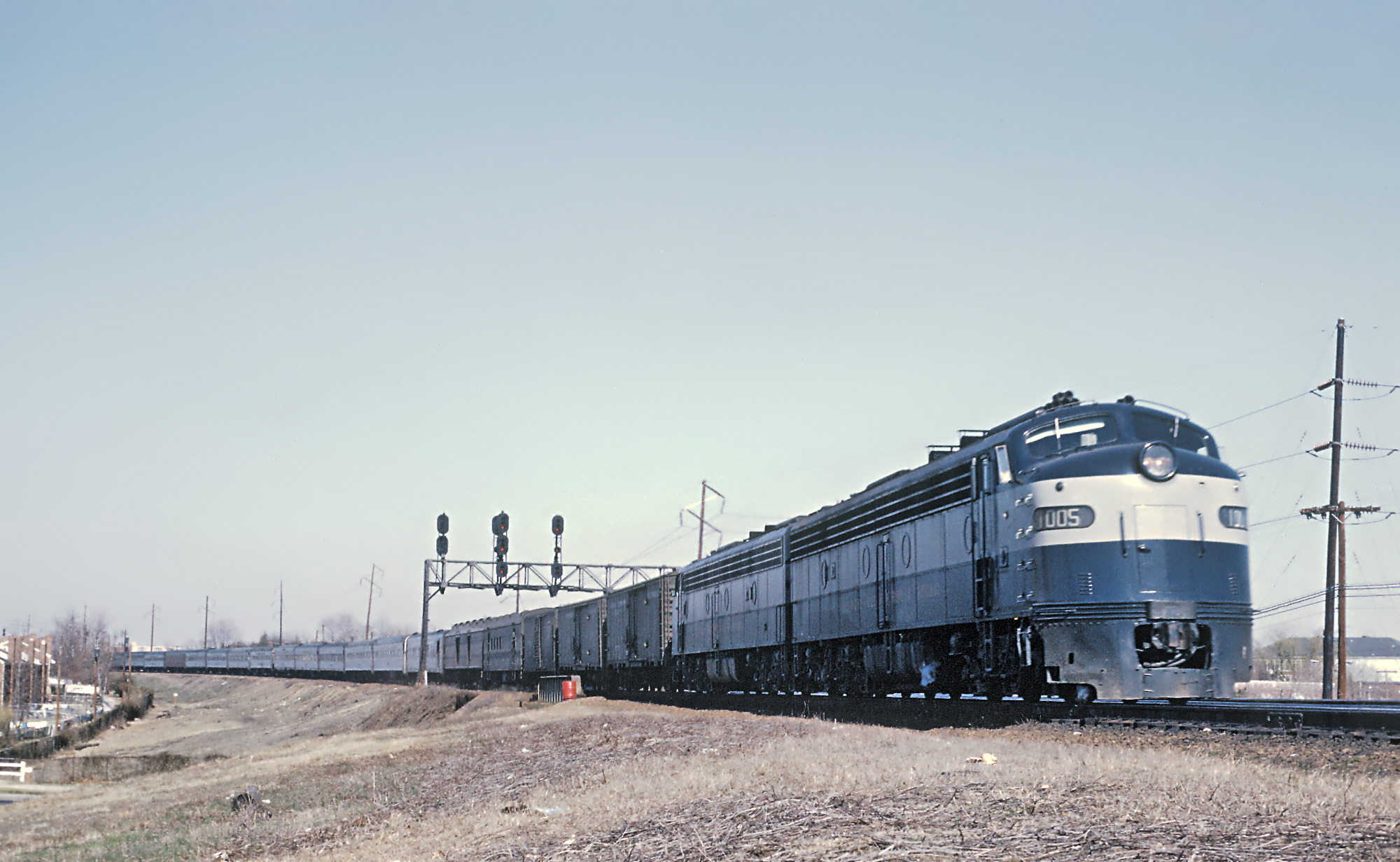
A Richmond, Fredericksburg and Potomac Railroad locomotive pulls the Silver Star at Alexandria, VA on March 23, 1969

Except for a brief period from 1994 to 1995 and from 1996 to 2004, when service to Tampa was provided by the Palmetto (known as the Silver Palm from 1996 to 2002), the Silver Star once served both Tampa and Miami during the Amtrak era. Originally, Amtrak operated the Silver Star with Tampa and Miami sections that split in Jacksonville, with the Tampa section continuing on the old Atlantic Coast Line route through Orlando, and the Miami section traveling through Ocala and Wildwood over most of what was the original Seaboard route to Miami. After November 1, 2004, the Silver Star resumed service to Tampa, and traveled intact all of the way, backing out of Tampa and retracing its route 40 miles (64 km) east to Auburndale, where it heads south to Miami or north to New York. The detour occurs at Lakeland; the train stops there to discharge passengers before going to Tampa and to receive passengers after it returns from Tampa.

In the January 2011 issue of Trains magazine, this route was listed as one of five routes to be looked at by Amtrak in FY 2011 as the previous five routes (the Sunset Limited, Texas Eagle, California Zephyr, Capitol Limited, and Cardinal) were examined in FY 2010. With the discontinuation of the Silver Meteor's former Tampa section (a descendant of the Champion, a longtime rival of the Silver Star and Silver Meteor) in 1988, the Silver Star was then the only passenger train serving Tampa.

On July 1, 2015, the Silver Star's dining car was completely removed from the train's consist, a controversial decision that Amtrak rationalized with the idea that sleeping car passengers could obtain meals from the train's café-lounge car. However, on May 1, 2020, the Silver Star's dining car was returned, and Amtrak introduced the “flexible dining” system to the train, which consists of pre-prepared meals which are then heated in either a convection oven or a microwave oven at the time of purchase. In a Rail Passengers Association webinar that took place on November 16, 2022, Amtrak's vice president of long-distance service revealed that traditional dining service was planned to be reintroduced on the Silver Meteor and the Silver Star "in early 2023." Following this announcement, beginning on northbound train 92 on March 15, 2023, traditional dining was reintroduced to the Silver Star for the first time since 2015. However, this was not a permanent rollout and was instead in the form of a 3-month pilot program gauged to test the success of the service. Southbound train 91 received the pilot on March 17. On June 24, 2023, traditional dining service was formally launched on the Silver Star, as well as on northbound Silver Meteor train 98, and the Silver Star pilot program was replaced by permanent service. Southbound train 97 received traditional dining on June 26. However, coach passengers were not allowed access to the dining car on either the Silver Meteor or Silver Star, unlike on Amtrak's western long-distance trains. Shortly after the formal rollout in another interview with the Rail Passengers Association, Amtrak's vice president of long-distance service stated that Coach Class access to the dining car was planned to be allowed by the end of 2023, however by January 2024 coach passengers still did not have access. On March 4, 2024, dining car access was finally expanded to coach passengers, mirroring service on Amtrak's western long-distance trains.

On February 4, 2018, southbound Silver Star train 91 collided with a CSX freight train in Cayce, South Carolina. The engineer and a conductor on the Silver Star were killed; 116 passengers were injured.

Since 2012, issues have prevented Amtrak from moving from their current station to the Miami Intermodal Center (MIC), primarily regarding the length of the platforms and lease agreements. Amtrak argued that the platforms were insufficient in length, as extra cars are normally added to the Silver Meteor and Silver Star during the winter season to accommodate increased demand. Tri-Rail began serving the MIC on April 5, 2015, and Greyhound began using the station on June 24, 2015. Amtrak had been expected to move to the MIC by the Fall of 2016, but in 2018 Amtrak rejected the terms of a lease agreement with FDOT and said it had no plans to move to the MIC. In 2021, Amtrak reached out to FDOT to begin negotiations again for utilization of the MIC, and in February 2022, negotiations officially restarted. Later in March 2022, a test train operated into and out of the station and proved that the platforms are sufficient in length to hold a standard 10 car train. However, the platforms are not long enough to accommodate an 11 to 12 car train, which could be possible in the winter months. In September 2022, Amtrak management announced that it had restarted lease negotiations with FDOT regarding use and maintenance of the terminal. One issue however, is the deadheading move that will need to take place between the MIC and Hialeah. Amtrak CEO Stephen Gardner has stated that "the company is evaluating technical and operational aspects of the move." In an Amtrak Public Board Meeting Q&A on December 1, 2022, it was revealed that Amtrak was in the final stages of its preparations for relocating from their current Miami station, and had planned to relocate to the MIC in 2023. However, additional track area would need to be constructed for the Amtrak trains to turn back north, and as of 2024, Amtrak has no date indicated for when service will start at the MIC.

On July 6, 2020, as the result of the COVID-19 pandemic, Amtrak reduced the frequency of this train to three times per week as opposed to daily. Southbound Silver Star trains departed New York Friday through Sunday, while Silver Meteor trains departed Monday through Thursday. Similarly, northbound Silver Star trains departed Miami on Thursday through Saturday, while Silver Meteor trains departed Sunday through Wednesday. Both trains resumed daily services on June 7, 2021, after additional Amtrak funding was included in the American Rescue Plan Act of 2021.

Between January 24 and October 14, 2022, the Silver Star temporarily added a station stop in Jesup, Georgia due to the suspension of its sister train, the Silver Meteor, which is normally the only train that stops at that station. This was due to a resurgence of the Omicron variant of COVID-19 as well as a further delay caused by Hurricane Ian. During this period the Silver Star provided a single once daily service between New York and Miami.

On November 10, 2024, the Capitol Limited and Silver Star were merged into a Chicago–Washington–Miami service, the Floridian. The Floridian service is intended to be temporary to accommodate equipment shortages and planned rehabilitation work in the East River Tunnels.

== Rolling stock ==
Southbound Silver Star passing Martin State Airport station at 100 mph, June 15, 2019

Under SAL operation, the Silver Star utilized passenger cars built by the Budd Company and Pullman Standard built either just before or after World War II, and diesel-electric locomotives from the EMD E-unit series. These cars utilized steam heating provided by a steam generator in the locomotive. This equipment continued to operate when Amtrak took over in 1971. E-units were replaced by newer power, such as the steam generator-equipped EMD SDP40F by the mid 1970's. Amtrak began rebuilding their inherited passenger cars in the late 1970's to utilize Head-end power (HEP); these rebuilt cars were known as the "Heritage Fleet." The train began using Heritage Fleet equipment on March 10, 1982, and subsequently HEP-equipped EMD F40PH locomotives.

The Silver Star used Amtrak's standard long-distance single-level equipment: Viewliner baggage, sleeping, and dining cars, and Amfleet coach and café-lounge cars. An ACS-64 electric locomotive is used between New York City and Washington, D.C., while two diesel-electric locomotives, either GE P42DC or Siemens ALC-42 locomotives, are used for power south of Washington, D.C. Amtrak began replacing the older P42DC locomotives with ALC-42 locomotives in 2023.

A typical Silver Star consists of the following as of September 2024:

- ACS-64 locomotive (New York–Washington)
- P42DC or ALC-42 locomotive (Washington–Miami)
- P42DC or ALC-42 locomotive (Washington–Miami)
- Amfleet II Coach
- Amfleet II Coach
- Amfleet II Coach
- Amfleet II Café/Lounge Car
- Viewliner II Dining Car
- Viewliner I Sleeping Car
- Viewliner II Sleeping Car
- Viewliner II Baggage Car

During the 2022 suspension of the Silver Meteor, some coach and sleeping cars usually on the Silver Meteor were combined into the Silver Star, creating a train with up to six coaches and five sleepers, in addition to the café-lounge, diner, and baggage car.

== Route details ==
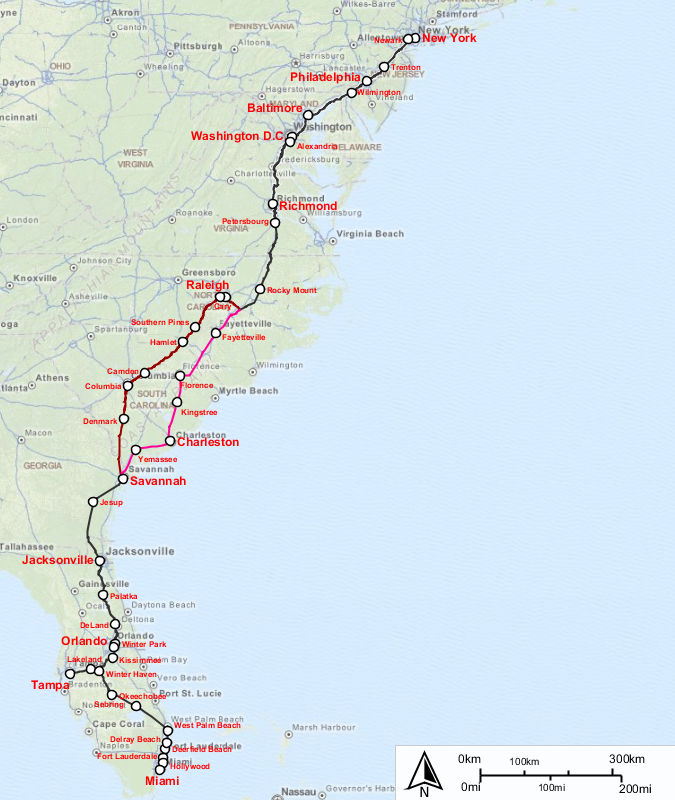
Amtrak Silver Service route map

The Silver Star operated over a combination of Amtrak, CSX Transportation (CSXT), and Norfolk Southern Railway (NS) trackage:

- New York – Washington D.C. (Amtrak)
  - Northeast Corridor:
- Washington D.C. – Selma, North Carolina (CSXT)
  - RF&P Subdivision
  - Richmond Terminal Subdivision
  - North End Subdivision
  - South End Subdivision:
- Selma – Raleigh, North Carolina (NS)
  - Goldsboro to Greensboro District
- Raleigh – DeLand, Florida (CSXT)
  - Aberdeen Subdivision
  - Hamlet Terminal Subdivision
  - Hamlet Subdivision
  - Columbia Subdivision
  - Savannah Subdivision
  - Nahunta Subdivision
  - Jacksonville Terminal Subdivision
  - Sanford Subdivision
- DeLand – Poinciana, Florida (SunRail)
  - Central Florida Rail Corridor
- Poinciana – Tampa, Florida – Mangonia Park, Florida (CSXT)
  - Carters Subdivision
  - Lakeland Subdivision
  - Tampa Terminal Subdivision
  - Auburndale Subdivision
  - Miami Subdivision
- Mangonia Park – Miami, Florida (Tri-Rail)
  - South Florida Rail Corridor

The Silver Star used the same route as the Silver Meteor – the other train in the Silver Service brand – excluding two segments: Selma, North Carolina – Savannah, Georgia, and Kissimmee, Florida – Winter Haven, Florida. Between Selma and Savannah, the Silver Star takes an inland route over the CSX S-Line to serve the Carolinas' state capitals of Raleigh and Columbia, while the Silver Meteor stays closer to the coast on the CSX A-Line and serves Fayetteville, North Carolina and Charleston, South Carolina. Between Kissimmee and Winter Haven, the Silver Meteor turns south to go directly to Miami at Auburndale, Florida, while the Silver Star continues west to Lakeland, Florida and Tampa, before coming back to Auburndale and turning south to Miami. In addition to these diversions, between Sebring, Florida and West Palm Beach, Florida, the Silver Meteor makes no intermediate stops, while the Silver Star makes an additional stop at Okeechobee, Florida. Inversely, between Savannah and Jacksonville, Florida, the Silver Meteor makes an additional stop at Jesup, Georgia, while the Silver Star made no intermediate stops. However, during the 2022 suspension of the Silver Meteor, the Silver Star temporarily served Jesup.

Prior to October 1986, the Silver Star operated between Petersburg, Virginia, and Raleigh via the CSX Norlina Subdivision, stopping only in Henderson, North Carolina. CSX abandoned the Norlina Subdivision between Norlina, North Carolina and Collier Yard (just south of Petersburg) in October 1986, which required the Silver Star to be rerouted over the CSX A-Line between Petersburg and Selma, then over the North Carolina Railroad between Selma and Raleigh. The Silver Star is to be rerouted via its former routing when tracks between Petersburg and Norlina are rebuilt as part of the Southeast High Speed Rail Corridor project, and reinstate its stop at Henderson, as well as adding a stop in La Crosse, Virginia.

Like other long-distance trains operating on the Northeast Corridor, local travel between NEC stations is not allowed on the Silver Star. Northbound trains only stop to discharge passengers from Alexandria, Virginia northward, and southbound trains only stop to receive passengers from Newark, New Jersey to Washington. This policy is in place to keep seats available for passengers making longer trips. Passengers wanting to travel locally must use the more frequent Northeast Regional or Acela trains. Additionally, the Silver Star, like the Silver Meteor, does not allow local travel between West Palm Beach and Miami. Southbound trains only stop to discharge passengers, while northbound trains only stop to receive passengers bound for points beyond West Palm Beach. This is due to the availability of Tri-Rail, South Florida's commuter rail system.

Since Amtrak ended passenger rail service over the CSX Clearwater Subdivision between Tampa and St. Petersburg, Florida in February 1984,Amtrak Thruway bus service has been provided at Tampa Union Station for trainside transfer of passengers and their baggage to and from Clearwater, Florida and St. Petersburg. Other points on Florida's west coast, such as Bradenton, Florida, Sarasota, Florida, Port Charlotte, Florida and Fort Myers, Florida, are also served by Amtrak Thruway service connecting with the Silver Star at Tampa. Similarly, Amtrak has provided Amtrak Thruway bus service between the former stations along the CSX Wildwood Subdivision in North-Central Florida since November 2004 after passenger rail service ended, as well as Gainesville, Florida and The Villages-Lady Lake, Florida. The former stations that are now served by Amtrak Thruway buses are: Waldo, Florida, Ocala, Florida, Wildwood, Florida, and Dade City, Florida. These buses connect with the Silver Star at Jacksonville and Lakeland.

== Station stops ==
State	Town/City	Station	Connections
NY	New York City	Penn Station	Amtrak (long-distance): Cardinal, Crescent, Lake Shore Limited, Palmetto, Silver Meteor; Amtrak (intercity): Acela, Adirondack, Berkshire Flyer, Carolinian, Empire Service, Ethan Allen Express, Keystone Service, Maple Leaf, Northeast Regional, Pennsylvanian, Vermonter; LIRR: ■ Main Line, ■ Port Washington Branch; NJ Transit: ■ North Jersey Coast Line, ■ Northeast Corridor Line, ■ Gladstone Branch, ■ Montclair–Boonton Line, ■ Morristown Line; NYC Subway: PATH: HOB-33 JSQ-33 JSQ-33 (via HOB); NYC Transit Bus
NJ	Newark	Newark Penn Station	Amtrak: Acela, Cardinal, Carolinian, Crescent, Keystone Service, Northeast Regional, Palmetto, Pennsylvanian, Silver Meteor, Vermonter; NJ Transit: ■ North Jersey Coast Line, ■ Northeast Corridor Line, ■ Raritan Valley Line; PATH: NWK-WTC; Newark Light Rail; NJ Transit Bus
NJ	Trenton	Trenton	Amtrak: Cardinal, Carolinian, Crescent, Keystone Service, Northeast Regional, Palmetto, Pennsylvanian, Silver Meteor, Vermonter; NJ Transit: ■ Northeast Corridor Line, ■ River Line; SEPTA Regional Rail: ■ Trenton Line; NJ Transit Bus, SEPTA Suburban Bus
PA	Philadelphia	30th Street Station	Amtrak: Acela, Cardinal, Carolinian, Crescent, Keystone Service, Northeast Regional, Palmetto, Pennsylvanian, Silver Meteor, Vermonter; SEPTA Regional Rail: all routes NJ Transit: ■ Atlantic City Line; SEPTA Metro: L, T SEPTA City Bus, SEPTA Suburban Bus
DE	Wilmington	Wilmington	Amtrak: Acela, Cardinal, Carolinian, Crescent, Northeast Regional, Palmetto, Silver Meteor, Vermonter; SEPTA Regional Rail: ■ Wilmington/Newark Line; DART First State; Greyhound Lines
MD	Baltimore	Penn Station	Amtrak: Acela, Cardinal, Carolinian, Crescent, Northeast Regional, Palmetto, Silver Meteor, Vermonter; MARC: ■ Penn Line; Light RailLink; MTA Maryland, Charm City Circulator
DC	Washington	Washington Union Station	Amtrak: Acela, Capitol Limited, Cardinal, Carolinian, Crescent, Northeast Regional, Palmetto, Silver Meteor, Vermonter, Amtrak Thruway to Charlottesville, Virginia; MARC: ■ Brunswick Line, ■ Camden Line, ■ Penn Line; VRE: ■ Manassas Line, ■ Fredericksburg Line; Metro: Red Line; DC Streetcar: H Street/Benning Road Line; Metrobus, DC Circulator, MTA Maryland, Loudoun County Transit, OmniRide; Intercity bus: Greyhound, Megabus, BestBus, Peter Pan, OurBus
VA	Alexandria	Alexandria	Amtrak: Cardinal, Carolinian, Crescent, Northeast Regional, Palmetto, Silver Meteor; VRE: ■ Manassas Line, ■ Fredericksburg Line; Metro: Blue Line, Yellow Line; Metrobus, DASH
VA	Richmond	Richmond Staples Mill Road	Amtrak: Carolinian, Northeast Regional, Palmetto, Silver Meteor, Amtrak Thruway to Charlottesville, Virginia; Greater Richmond Transit Company
VA	Ettrick	Petersburg	Amtrak: Carolinian, Northeast Regional, Palmetto, Silver Meteor; Petersburg Area Transit
NC	Rocky Mount	Rocky Mount	Amtrak: Carolinian, Palmetto, Silver Meteor; Tar River Transit; Greyhound Lines
NC	Raleigh	Raleigh Union Station	Amtrak: Carolinian, Piedmont; GoRaleigh, GoTriangle
NC	Cary	Cary	Amtrak: Carolinian, Piedmont; GoCary, GoTriangle
NC	Southern Pines	Southern Pines	
NC	Hamlet	Hamlet	
SC	Camden	Camden	
SC	Columbia	Columbia	The Comet
SC	Denmark	Denmark	
GA	Savannah	Savannah	Amtrak: Palmetto, Silver Meteor
FL	Jacksonville	Jacksonville	Amtrak: Silver Meteor, Amtrak Thruway to Waldo, Ocala, Gainesville, The Villages, Wildwood, Dade City, Lakeland; Jacksonville Transportation Authority
FL	Palatka	Palatka	Amtrak: Silver Meteor; The Ride Solution
FL	DeLand	DeLand	Amtrak: Silver Meteor, Amtrak Thruway to Daytona Beach; SunRail; Votran
FL	Winter Park	Winter Park	Amtrak: Silver Meteor; SunRail; LYNX Bus
FL	Orlando	Orlando	Amtrak: Silver Meteor, Amtrak Thruway to Lakeland, Tampa, St. Petersburg, Bradenton, Sarasota, Port Charlotte, Fort Myers; SunRail; LYNX Bus
FL	Kissimmee	Kissimmee	Amtrak: Silver Meteor; SunRail; LYNX Bus; Greyhound Lines
FL	Lakeland	Lakeland	Amtrak Thruway to Dade City, Wildwood, The Villages, Gainesville, Ocala, Waldo Jacksonville, Orlando, Tampa, St. Petersburg, Bradenton, Sarasota, Port Charlotte, Fort Myers; Citrus Connection; Greyhound Lines
FL	Tampa	Tampa	Amtrak Thruway to Dade City, Wildwood, The Villages, Gainesville, Ocala, Waldo, Jacksonville, Lakeland, Orlando, St. Petersburg, Bradenton, Sarasota, Port Charlotte, Fort Myers; Hillsborough Area Regional Transit
FL	Winter Haven	Winter Haven	Amtrak: Silver Meteor
FL	Sebring	Sebring	Amtrak: Silver Meteor
FL	Okeechobee	Okeechobee	
FL	West Palm Beach	West Palm Beach	Amtrak: Silver Meteor; Tri-Rail; Brightline (at West Palm Beach); Palm Tran, Tri-Rail Commuter Connector, West Palm Beach Downtown Trolley; Greyhound Lines
FL	Delray Beach	Delray Beach	Amtrak: Silver Meteor; Tri-Rail; Palm Tran, Downtown Connector
FL	Deerfield Beach	Deerfield Beach	Amtrak: Silver Meteor; Tri-Rail; Broward County Transit, Tri-Rail Commuter Connector
FL	Fort Lauderdale	Fort Lauderdale	Amtrak: Silver Meteor; Tri-Rail; Broward County Transit, Metrobus, Sun Trolley, Tri-Rail Commuter Connector
FL	Hollywood	Hollywood	Amtrak: Silver Meteor; Tri-Rail; Broward County Transit, Hallandale Beach Community Bus
FL	Miami	Miami	Amtrak: Silver Meteor; Metrobus
