= Silver Service =

Duo of Amtrak trains operating from New York to Florida

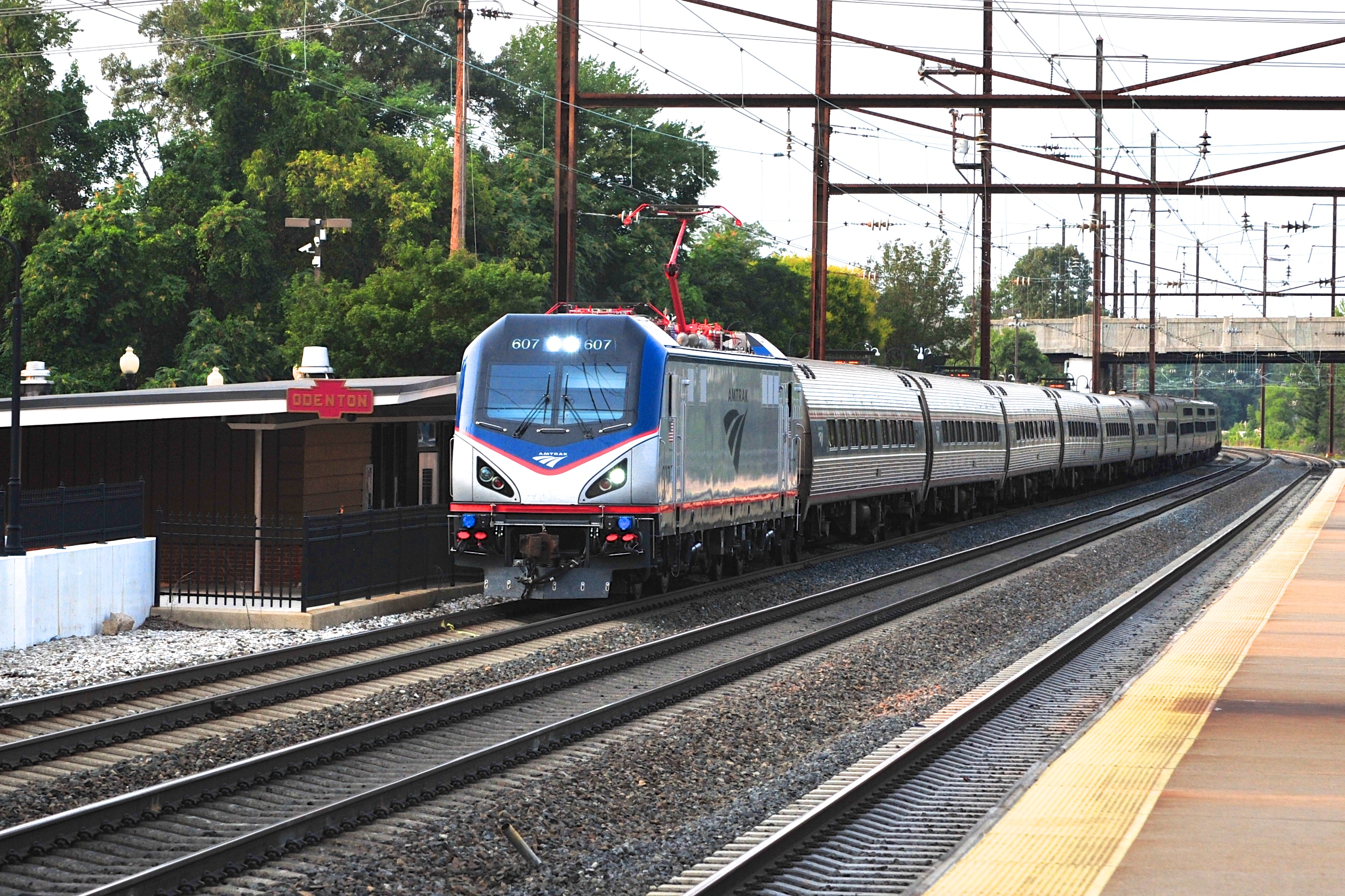
- The Silver Meteor passing Odenton station in 2014

Overview
- Locale: United States East Coast
- Transit type: Inter-city rail
- Number of lines: 2
- Website: Amtrak Silver Service

Operation
- Operator: Amtrak

Technical
- Track gauge: 4 ft 8 1/2 in (1,435 mm) standard gauge

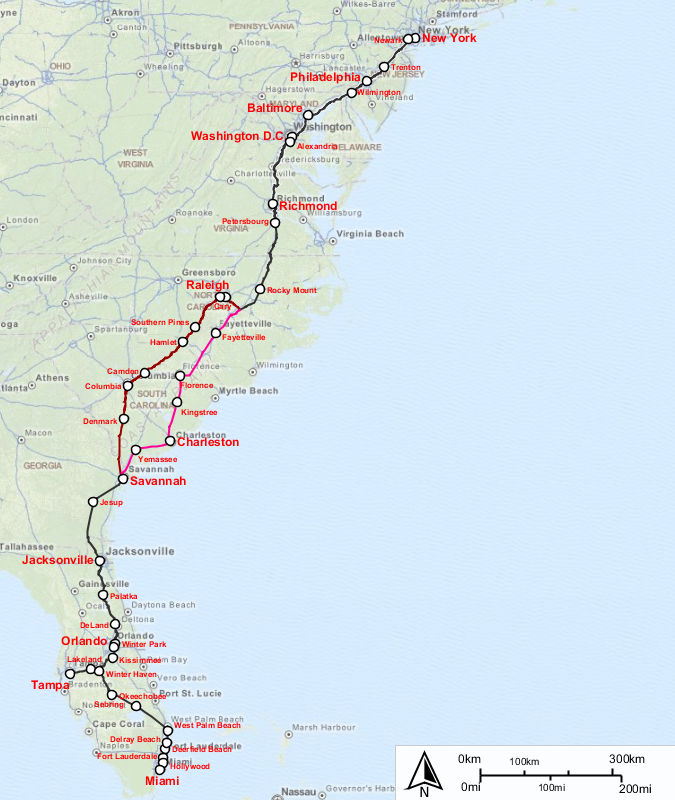
Amtrak Silver Service map

Silver Service was a brand applied by Amtrak to its long-distance trains running along the United States East Coast between New York City and Miami, Florida. It comprised two trains – the Silver Meteor and Silver Star. Since November 2024, the Silver Star has been temporarily combined with the Capitol Limited to form the Floridian, a Chicago–Washington–Miami route. The Silver Service brand was subsequently quietly discontinued for an indefinite period at the same time.

The two services follow the same general route between New York City and Miami, but diverge between Selma, North Carolina, and Savannah, Georgia, as well as at Auburndale, Florida. The Silver Meteor takes a more direct, coastal route on the CSX A-Line between Selma and Savannah via Fayetteville, North Carolina, Florence, South Carolina, and Charleston, South Carolina, while the Silver Star travels inland over the CSX S-Line to serve the Carolinas' two state capitals, Raleigh, North Carolina, and Columbia, South Carolina. At Auburndale, Florida, the Silver Star continues west to service Lakeland and Tampa, while the Silver Meteor turns south to go directly to Miami.

Amtrak's Palmetto operates over the Silver Meteor's route between New York City and Savannah. However, from 1996 to 2002, the train was known as the Silver Palm and ran all the way south to Miami, though over a different routing between Jacksonville and Auburndale. The Palmetto name was reverted in 2002, and service was eventually truncated back to Savannah in 2004.

== History ==
The two Silver Service trains were inherited from the Seaboard Coast Line Railroad, which originally inherited them from the Seaboard Air Line Railroad, when Amtrak took over most intercity rail service in 1971. They are the sole remnants of numerous long-distance trains that ran between the Northeast and Florida for most of the 20th century. Amtrak originally applied the Florida Fleet brand to the Silver Meteor, Silver Star, and the now-discontinued Champion, another train inherited from SCL, in the 1970s.

Prior to 1979, the Silver Meteor travelled between Savannah and Jacksonville, Florida, via the Seaboard Coast Line's ex-SAL Everett Subdivision with a stop at Thalmann, Georgia, for the nearby city of Brunswick, Georgia. The train was rerouted via SCL's ex-ACL mainline via Jesup, Georgia, in late 1979, the same route as the Silver Star, after SCL expressed desire to abandon the Everett Subdivision. Similarly, the Silver Star ran between Petersburg, Virginia, and Raleigh via the ex-SAL Norlina Subdivision, with a stop at Henderson, North Carolina, until 1985. When CSX Transportation, corporate successor of Seaboard Coast Line, abandoned the line between Petersburg and Norlina, North Carolina, in 1985, the Silver Star was rerouted via Selma en route to Raleigh. Currently, under the Southeast High Speed Rail Corridor plan, the Norlina Subdivision will be rebuilt between Petersburg and Norlina, with both the Silver Star and Amtrak's Charlotte–New York Carolinian being rerouted over the line, with the stop at Henderson being reinstated, as well as a new stop being added at La Crosse, Virginia.

Starting in 1982, Amtrak operated a service called the Silver Palm between Miami and Tampa. This was later discontinued in 1985 due to low ridership. From 1996 to 2002, the Palmetto was renamed Silver Palm, and operated as a third train in the Silver Service brand between New York and Miami. However, it turned west at Jacksonville and ran via Waldo, Ocala, Wildwood, Dade City, Tampa and Lakeland, before rejoining the Silver Star and Silver Meteor in Auburndale. Amtrak reinstated the Palmetto name on May 1, 2002, after eliminating the sleeper and dining cars, but it still provided service to Florida. On November 1, 2004, the Palmetto was shortened to operate only between New York and Savannah, reverting to its daytime schedule as it had before 1994. Since then, the Silver Star began its out-and-back detour route to serve Lakeland and Tampa.

In response to planned rehabilitation work in the East River Tunnels, the Silver Star was temporarily combined with the Capitol Limited on November 10, 2024, forming a Chicago–Washington–Miami through service called the Floridian.

== See also ==
- Silver Comet
