= Sun Lounge (railcar) =

Class of 3 American sleeper-lounge passenger railroad cars

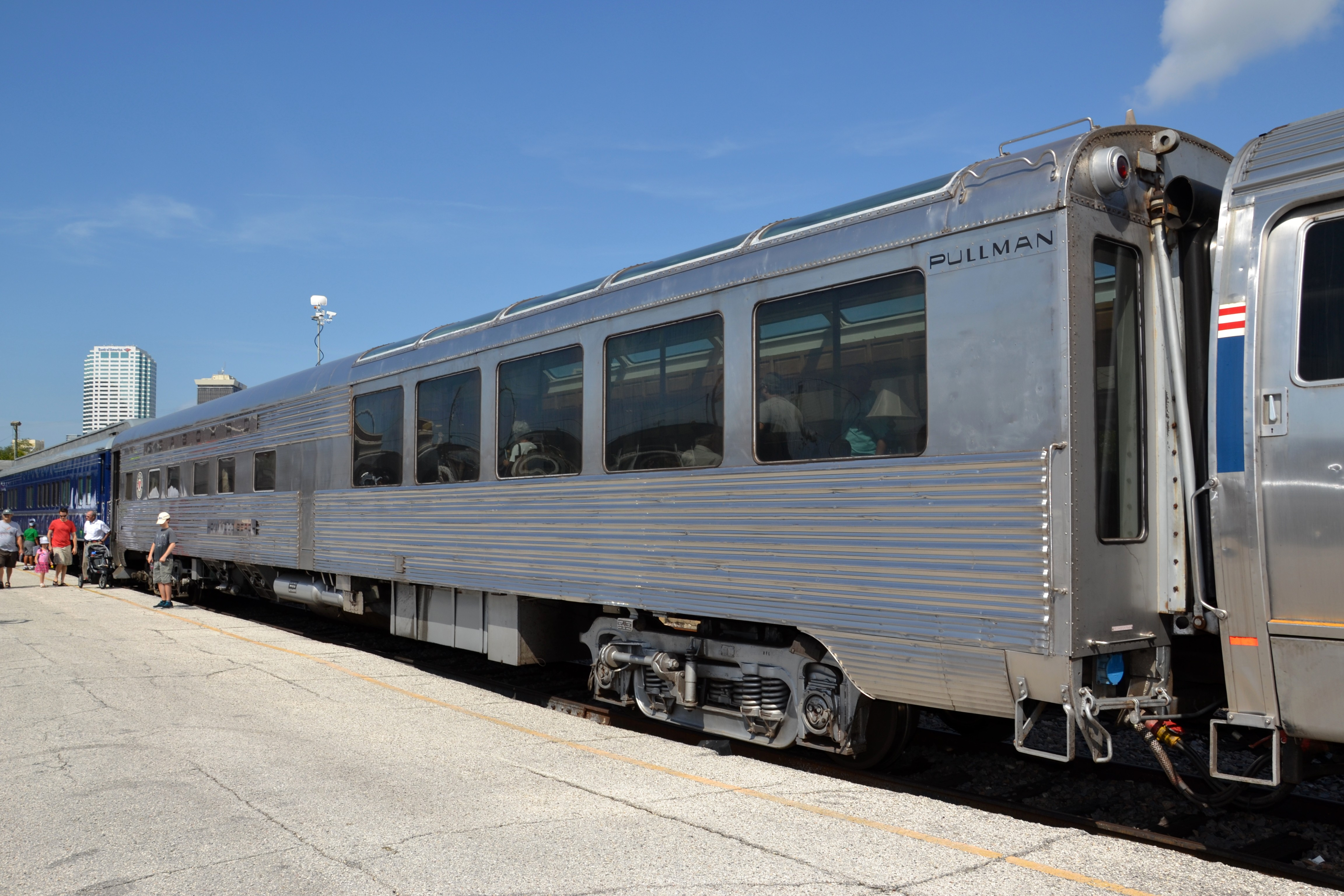
- The lounge area of the Hollywood Beach Sun Lounge.

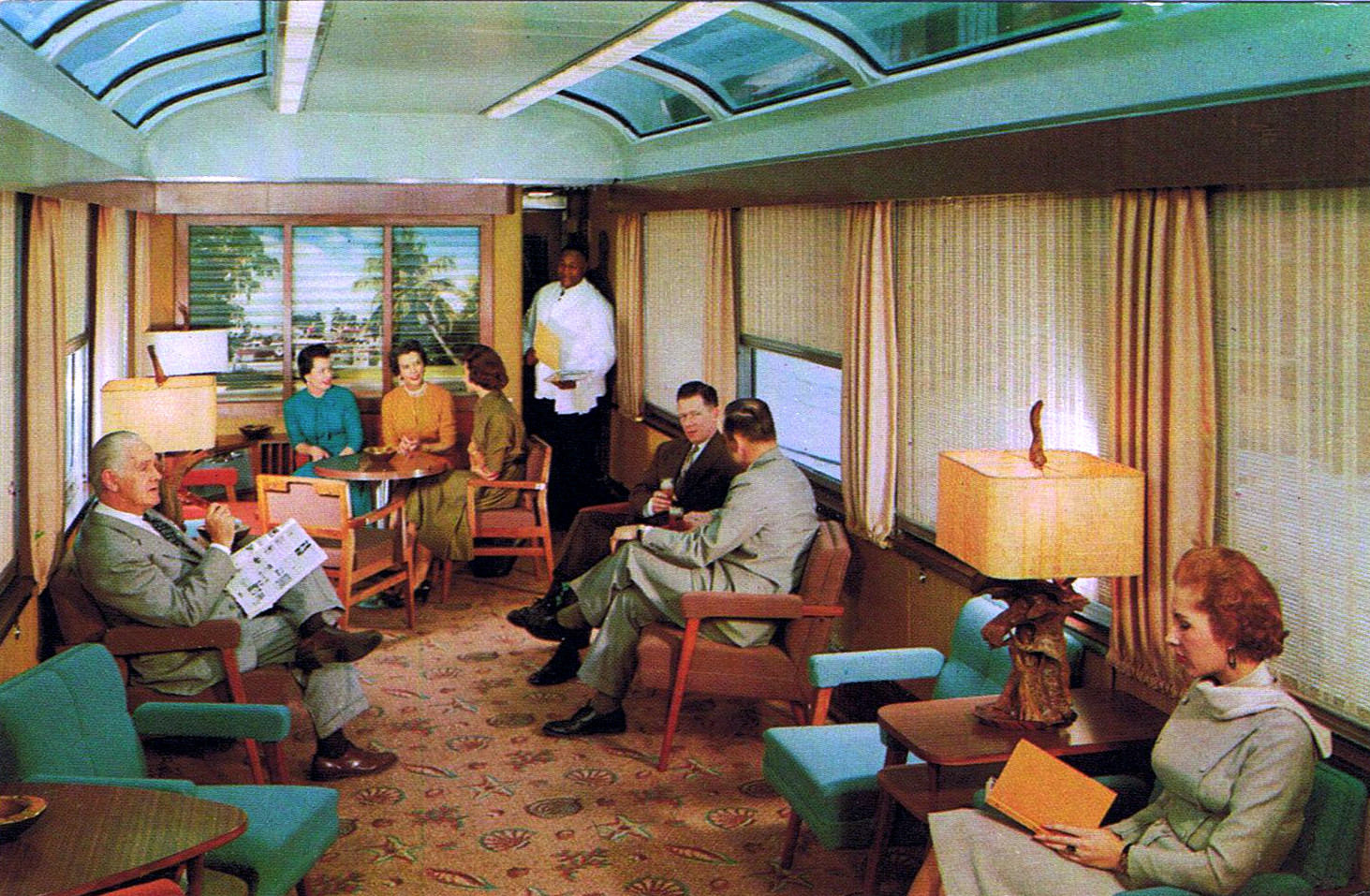
- Postcard of a Sun Lounge interior in the 1960s.
- In service: 1956-1981
- Manufacturer: Pullman-Standard
- Constructed: 1956
- Entered service: 1956
- Scrapped: ~1980 (Sun Beam/Palm Beach)
- Number built: 3
- Number preserved: 2
- Number scrapped: 1
- Diagram: 4202
- Fleet numbers: 18–20 (SAL); 6500–6502 (SCL); 3230–3232 (Amtrak)
- Capacity: 5 double bedrooms
- Operators: Seaboard Air Line Railroad; Seaboard Coast Line Railroad; Amtrak

Specifications
- Car length: 85 feet (25.91 m)
- Width: 10 feet 6 inches (3.20 m)
- Height: 13 feet 6 inches (4.11 m)
- Wheel diameter: 36 inches (0.91 m)
- Weight: 135,100–135,700 pounds (61,300–61,600 kg)
- HVAC: 10-ton Frigidaire Freon Electro-Mechanical AC, Steam heat
- Braking system: Air
- Coupling system: AAR
- Track gauge: 4 ft 8 1/2 in (1,435 mm) standard gauge

The Sun Lounges were a fleet of three streamlined sleeper-lounge cars built by Pullman-Standard for the Seaboard Air Line Railroad (SAL) in 1956. The cars featured a distinctive glazed roof area meant to capture the ambience of a dome car in a lower profile, as tunnels on the East Coast of the United States prevented the use of dome cars there. The Seaboard employed all three Sun Lounges on its flagship Silver Meteor between New York City and Miami, Florida. The cars later saw service with the Seaboard Coast Line Railroad (SCL) and Amtrak. Two of the three survive in private ownership.

== Design ==
The first successful dome design in the United States was the "Vista Dome", which began test runs in 1945. The Chicago, Burlington and Quincy Railroad ("CB&Q") rebuilt a stainless steel Budd-built coach in their shops in Aurora, Illinois, with the Vista Dome design imagined and sketched by Cyrus Osborn. The dome area featured seats positioned lengthwise in the cabin facing double-pane windows which were designed to improve insulation. While popular with travelers, dome cars could not be used on most railroads in the Eastern United States because of the low clearance on various tunnels. Even the low-slung "Strata-Domes", designed by Pullman-Standard for the Chesapeake and Ohio Railway, could not travel north of Washington, D.C. due to low tunnel clearances in Baltimore and New York City.

The concept of a "sun lounge" or a "sun parlor" was not new in railroading. The Illinois Central Railroad's Panama Limited, introduced in 1911, included a "sun-parlor" observation car, with wrap-around windows and a mahogany interior. In 1931 the Seaboard itself added a "lounge sun-parlor car" to the Southern States Special, one of its New York-Florida trains.

The SAL turned to Pullman to design a sleeper-lounge which captured the ambiance of a dome car in a single-level car. The resulting "Sun Lounge" was split into two parts. At one end were five double bedrooms with a lounge for use by sleeping car passengers on the train at the other. A small bar was located between the bedrooms and lounge area to serve sleeping car passengers. The lounge was unique, enclosed by large picture windows and glass windows on the roof, creating the effect of a dome without a dome. The lounge interior included such Floridian touches as light fixtures made of driftwood. In contemporary advertising the Seaboard touted the Sun Lounges as "unlike anything on the rails at present."

== Service history ==
Pullman delivered three Sun Lounges to the Seaboard: Miami Beach, Palm Beach, and Hollywood Beach, numbered 18-20 respectively. All three entered service in 1956 on the Silver Meteor. When the Seaboard merged with its rival the Atlantic Coast Line Railroad (ACL) in 1967 to create the Seaboard Coast Line Railroad (SCL), the cars remained in service but were renamed. Hollywood Beach became Sun Ray, Miami Beach became Sun View, and Palm Beach became Sun Beam. The cars were also renumbered 6500-6502 respectively. The reason for the change was SCL's efforts to standardize the names of their passenger equipment. The old "Beach" names were given to the three 5 double bedroom-buffet-lounges SAL had owned in order to bring those cars in line with ACL's "Beach" cars of the same configuration. Those cars were used on the Silver Meteor prior to the delivery of the Sun Lounges, and were occasionally used afterward when a Sun Lounge was unavailable.

Amtrak inherited all three lounges in 1971, keeping the SCL names but renumbering the cars for a second time. The cars were assigned numbers 3230–3232, and were Sun Beam, Sun Ray, and Sun View respectively. The cars were kept in service on the Silver Meteor, but were transferred to the Florida Special for the 1971-1972 winter season. Amtrak retired Sun View in 1977, and Sun Beam and Sun Ray followed in 1981. None of three were converted to head-end power under the Heritage Fleet program. The Sun Beam (Palm Beach) was scrapped in the 1980s. The other two cars are privately owned.

== See also ==
- Panoramic coach (Indonesia)
