= Jesup station =

Passenger railroad station in Jesup, Wayne County, Georgia

Jesup, GA
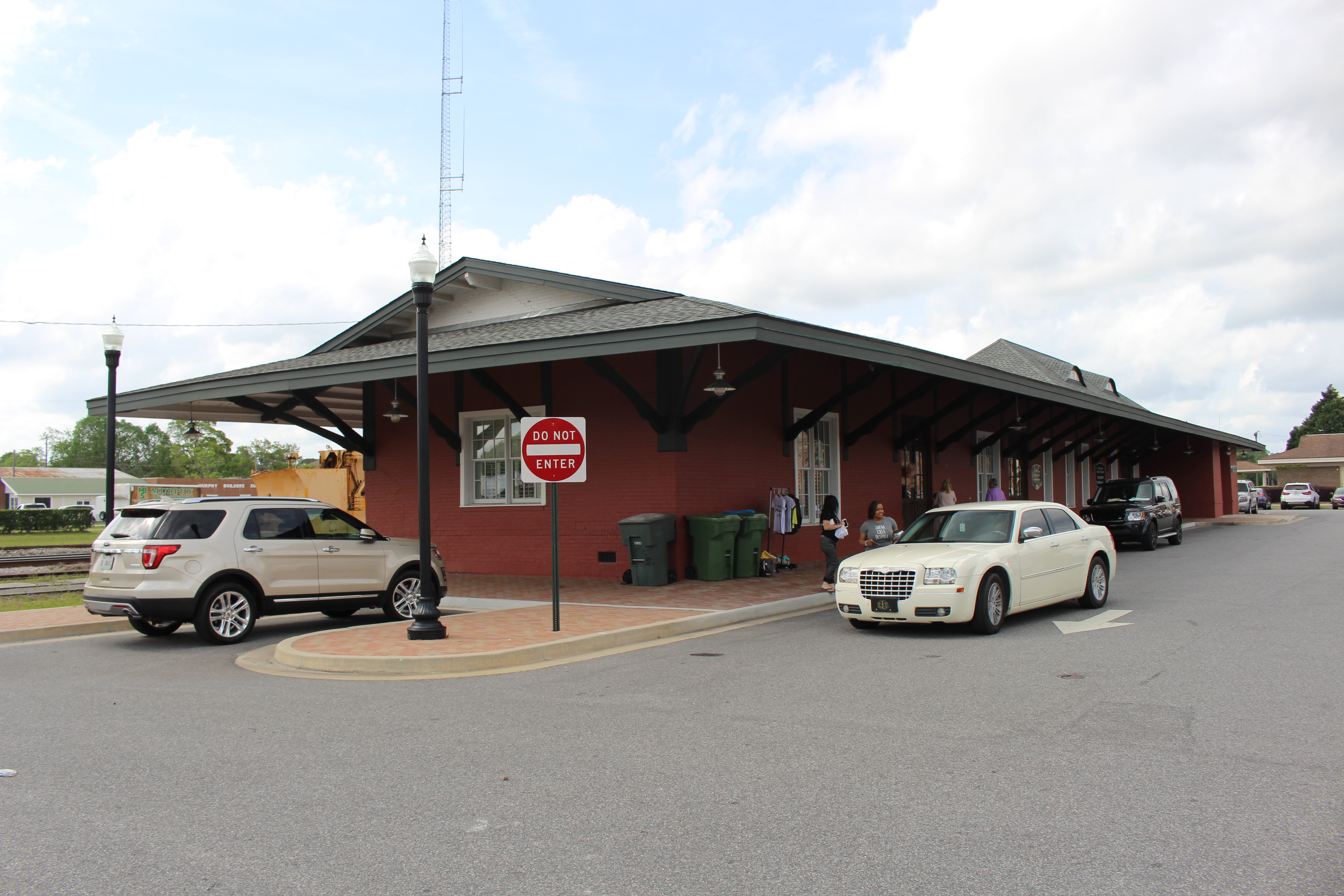
- The Jesup station in 2017

General information
- Location: 176 Northwest Broad Street; Jesup, Georgia; United States
- Coordinates: 31°36′21″N 81°52′56″W
- Platforms: 1 side platform
- Tracks: 2

Other information
- Station code: Amtrak: JSP

History
- Opened: October 1, 1979 (Amtrak)
- Rebuilt: –1899

Key dates
- January 4, 1898: First station depot burned

Passengers
- FY 2025: 9,165 (Amtrak)

Services
Preceding station	Amtrak	Following station
Jacksonville toward Miami	Silver Meteor	Savannah toward New York
Auto Train does not stop here
Floridian does not stop here
Former services
Preceding station	Atlantic Coast Line Railroad	Following station
Screven toward Tampa via Waycross	Main Line	Doctortown toward Richmond
Hortense toward Tampa via Nahunta	Main Line	Doctortown toward Richmond
Location

Jesup station is a railroad station in the city of Jesup, Wayne County, Georgia, United States. Located at 176 Northwest Broad Street, the station is currently in use for service on Amtrak's Silver Meteor and bypassed by their Auto Train and Floridian. Amtrak service began on October 1, 1979, when the Silver Meteor was realigned away from a station on State Route 32 at Thalmann, Georgia.

The station was built in 1899 as part of the Atlantic Coast Line Railroad on a line originally built by the Atlantic and Gulf Railroad then acquired by Henry B. Plant's Savannah, Florida and Western Railway. The station also became the northern terminus of the Folkston Cutoff in 1902. In February 2003, the station was damaged in an electrical fire and subsequently boarded up as the town sought funds for restoration. In 2005, Jesup received $836,000 in federal funds after the rehabilitation was designated a High Priority Project under the federal transportation bill. The city also purchased the building and land from CSX Transportation, owner of the adjacent railroad line. The city decided to return the building to its early 20th-century appearance.

The completion of the rehabilitation project was celebrated in October 2012 during the city's annual Arch Festival, an event started in 2003 to highlight the renewed downtown. In addition to a passenger waiting room, the depot now also includes a community meeting space and new offices and a welcome center for the Wayne County Board of Tourism. The interior is decorated with historic photographs and memorabilia that demonstrate the strong ties between Jesup and the railroads. A formal ribbon-cutting ceremony was held on March 8, 2013 and included speeches by the mayor and an Amtrak representative.

Between January 24 and October 14, 2022, the Silver Star temporarily stopped in Jesup due to the suspension of the Silver Meteor, which is normally the only train that stops at this station. This was due to a resurgence of the Omicron variant of COVID-19 as well as a further delay caused by Hurricane Ian.
