= Jacksonville station =

Railway station in Jacksonville, Florida, US

Jacksonville, FL
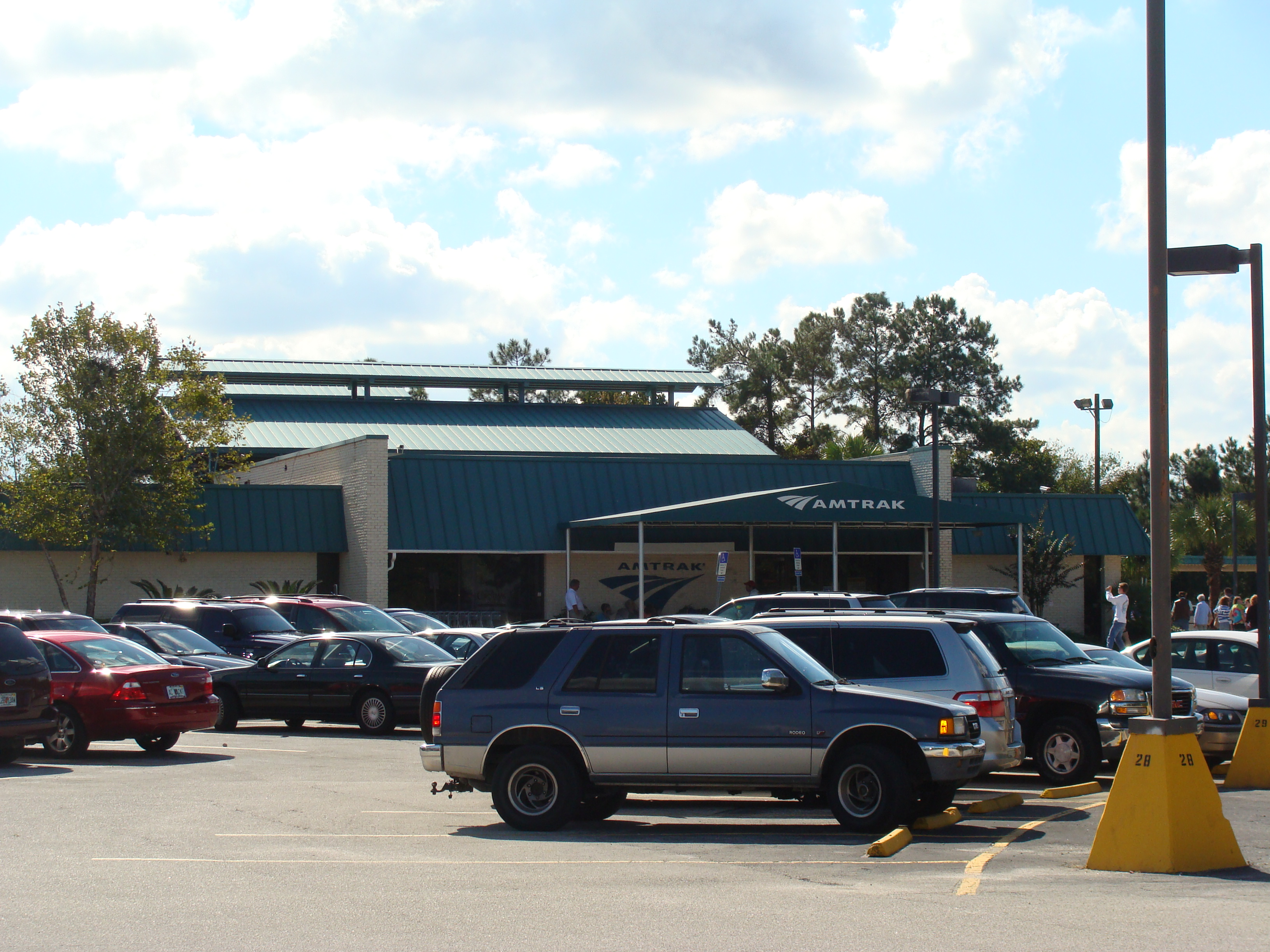
- The front of the station

General information
- Location: 3570 Clifford Lane; Jacksonville, Florida; United States
- Coordinates: 30.3661°N 81.72339°W
- Owner: Amtrak
- Platforms: 1 island platform, 1 side platform
- Tracks: 4 (2 station tracks and 2 house tracks)
- Connections: Amtrak Thruway to Gainesville and Ocala; JTA Bus: 3

Construction
- Parking: Yes
- Cycle facilities: Yes
- Accessible: Yes

Other information
- Station code: Amtrak: JAX

History
- Opened: 1974

Passengers
- FY 2025: 94,915 (Amtrak)

Services
Preceding station	Amtrak	Following station
Palatka toward Miami	Floridian	Savannah toward Chicago
Palatka toward Miami	Silver Meteor	Jesup toward New York
Auto Train does not stop here
Former services
Preceding station	Amtrak	Following station
Palatka toward Orlando or Miami	Sunset Limited 1993–2005	Lake City toward Los Angeles
Waldo toward Miami	Palmetto 2002–2004	Savannah toward New York
DeLand toward St. Petersburg	Floridian 1971–1979	Waycross toward Chicago
Waldo toward Miami	Floridian 1971–1979	Waycross toward Chicago
Palatka toward Miami	Silver Star until 2024	Savannah toward New York
Palatka toward Miami	Silver Meteor	Thalmann until 1979 toward New York
Location

Jacksonville station is an Amtrak train station in the Northside neighborhood of Jacksonville, Florida, United States. It is served by the Floridian and Silver Meteor trains as well as Amtrak Thruway buses.

== History ==
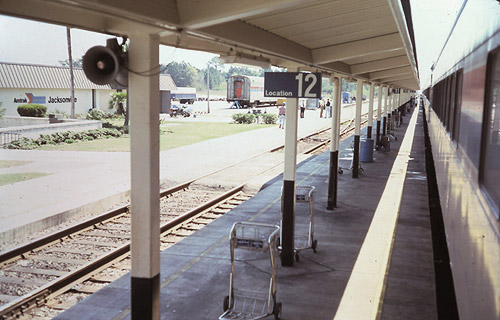
Viewed from the Champion in 1979

Amtrak opened the station on January 4, 1974, replacing Jacksonville Union Terminal (now Prime F. Osborn III Convention Center) downtown. The station saw eight trains daily upon opening, four in each direction. Those trains were the Silver Meteor, Silver Star, Champion, and Floridian, but also very briefly saw the Vacationer. The Floridian and Champion were discontinued in the 1979 budget cuts.

In 1993, the Sunset Limited was extended east from its New Orleans terminus all the way to Miami, and added a stop at Jacksonville. Then in 1996, the station's services were further expanded to include the newly reinstated Silver Palm running from New York to Tampa.

On November 1, 2004, however, the Silver Palm, now renamed to Palmetto, had its terminus cut back to Savannah, Georgia. Later, in 2005, the Sunset Limited was suspended east of New Orleans in the wake of Hurricane Katrina. This left the station with just two trains in each direction a day: the Silver Meteor and Silver Star. On November 10, 2024, the Silver Star was merged with the Capitol Limited as the Floridian.
