= Savannah station (Amtrak) =

Amtrak station in Georgia, US

Savannah, GA
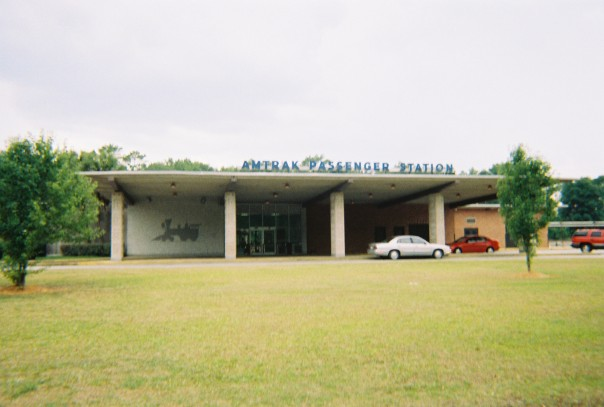

General information
- Location: 2611 Seaboard Coastline Drive; Savannah, Georgia; United States
- Coordinates: 32.0836°N 81.1486°W
- Owner: Savannah Economic Development Authority
- Line: Savannah Subdivision
- Platforms: 1 side platform, 1 island platform
- Tracks: 3

Construction
- Parking: Yes
- Accessible: Yes

Other information
- Station code: Amtrak: SAV

History
- Opened: 1962

Passengers
- FY 2025: 73,969 (Amtrak)

Services
Preceding station	Amtrak	Following station
Jacksonville toward Miami	Floridian	Denmark toward Chicago
Terminus	Palmetto	Yemassee toward New York
Jesup toward Miami	Silver Meteor	Yemassee toward New York
Former services
Preceding station	Amtrak	Following station
Jacksonville toward Miami	Palmetto (2002–2004)	Charleston toward New York
Jacksonville toward Miami	Silver Star until 2024	Denmark toward New York
Thalmann until 1979 toward Miami	Silver Meteor	Yemassee toward New York
Preceding station	Atlantic Coast Line Railroad	Following station
Wathourville toward Tampa	Main Line	Yemassee toward Richmond
Location

Savannah station is an Amtrak train station in Savannah, Georgia. It serves the Floridian, Palmetto, and Silver Meteor; it is the southern terminus of the Palmetto. The station has one island platform and one side platform which together serve two main tracks and one siding of the Savannah Subdivision.

== History ==
The station was constructed in 1962 by the Atlantic Coast Line Railroad as a replacement for Savannah Union Station, which was demolished for the construction of Interstate 16 into the downtown area. The $1.5 million station was built in the mid-century modern style.

On November 10, 2024, the Silver Star was merged with the Capitol Limited as the Floridian.

== See also ==
- Central of Georgia Depot and Trainshed
- Savannah Union Station
- Public transportation in Savannah, Georgia
