= Vacationer (train) =

Seasonal passenger train between New York City and Miami, Florida

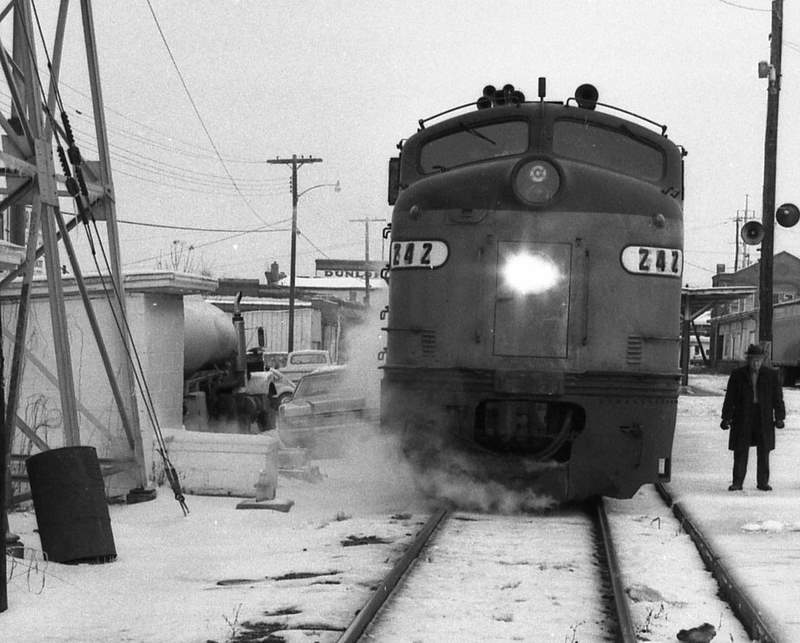
- The Vacationer at Columbia, South Carolina in 1972

Overview
- Service type: Inter-city rail
- Status: Discontinued
- Locale: Northeastern United States; Southeastern United States
- Predecessor: Florida Special
- First service: 1938; 87 years ago
- Last service: March 31, 1974; 51 years ago
- Former operator(s): Atlantic Coast Line Railroad; Seaboard Coast Line Railroad; Amtrak

Route
- Termini: New York, New York; Miami, Florida
- Distance travelled: 1,403 miles (2,258 km)
- Service frequency: (Seasonal winter train; daily operation during operating season)
- Train number(s): 95 (southbound); 96 (northbound)

On-board services
- Seating arrangements: Coaches
- Sleeping arrangements: Roomettes and bedrooms; slumbercoach (single and double rooms) (1973)
- Catering facilities: Dining car and club dining car

Technical
- Track gauge: 1,435 mm (4 ft 8 1/2 in)

The Vacationer was a seasonal passenger train operated by Amtrak between New York City and Miami, Florida. The Vacationer, like its predecessor the Florida Special, was designed to supplement regular Northeast—Florida service during the winter months. It made its final run on March 31, 1974. The Florida Special dated back to 1888; the Vacationer originated in 1938.

== History ==
=== Atlantic Coast Line origins ===
The Florida Special was a popular service, earning a reputation for luxury during its 84-year history, taking an express, limited stops route. However, following the entry of the United States into World War II, the Atlantic Coast Line Railroad (ACL) took its Florida Special, Vacationer, and another winter-only ACL train, the Miamian, out of service following the 1941–1942 season. All three returned to service on December 12, 1946. In the early post-WWII years the ACL's Florida Special was all Pullman, without coaches. It made no stops between Richmond, Virginia and Jacksonville, Florida, except for Florence, South Carolina and Nahunta, Georgia; and on the northbound schedule it made an added stop at Charleston, South Carolina. The Vacationer was upgraded in the 1947–1948 season from an all-coach train to a coach and Pullman sleeper train.

During final post-WWII years of high frequency of train service, the ACL operated not only the seasonal Florida Special but also the Vacationer. The Florida Special left New York City at 1:40 pm; while the Vacationer left Boston at 10:15 am and New York at 3:05 pm. From Miami, the Florida Special had a morning departure; and the Vacationer had a 1:00 pm mid-day departure. However, the Vacationer was once again dropped from service in 1955. By 1961, the ACL continued to operate the Florida Special on an express itinerary, bypassing many stops in the Carolinas that the ACL's Everglades train made. It added more stops in lower Virginia and South Carolina, yet between Florence, South Carolina and Jacksonville it made no stops. At the same time, coaches were added to its consist.

Since ACL rails did not extend to Miami, the Florida Special was carried by the Florida East Coast Railway along its Atlantic coast route south of Jacksonville. However, after a violent 1963 strike effectively ended passenger service on the FEC, the ACL thereafter moved the train on its own rails from Jacksonville to Auburndale, where it was handed over to the Seaboard Air Line Railroad for the final leg to Miami.

=== Amtrak iteration ===
Amtrak continued the seasonal train tradition when it began operations by including the Florida Special in its winter 1971-1972 schedule. It operated with limited stops, only stopping at high-traffic stops in the Middle Atlantic and making no stops between Richmond, Virginia and Winter Haven, Florida. Yet, while desiring to continue the tradition of expanded seasonal service, Amtrak could not continue to maintain the same high standards which the name demanded and in the 1972-73 winter season restored the name Vacationer, while retaining the same route. Consistent with past itineraries, this new incarnation was not a limited stops train. Some of the luxuries previously found aboard the Special migrated to the Silver Meteor.

The new Vacationer departed New York's Penn Station at 6:35 pm, which permitted a same-day connection for passengers coming from Boston. The Vacationer carried both coaches and sleepers New York—Miami; in Washington it exchanged a Miami—Montreal sleeper with the Montrealer. Sleeping accommodations included bedrooms and roomettes, plus single and double rooms in a slumbercoach. The train carried a lounge and full diner. Seasonal service ended April 28, 1973.

The Vacationer returned on December 14, 1973, with a slightly earlier departure from New York. It no longer handled a Miami—Montreal sleeping car; such service was taken over by the Silver Star. The 1973 oil crisis led to a surge in patronage; the Vacationer ran with a total of 18 cars. Amtrak later added a second dining car to the train to meet the increased demand. Seasonal service ended March 31, 1974.

The Vacationer did not return for the 1974—1975 season; Amtrak instead introduced the Miamian over the same route but with a slightly different schedule and different numbers, but canceled it after three weeks because of equipment shortages. In 1975 Amtrak dropped the special seasonal trains altogether when it returned the Champion, which had been combined with the Silver Meteor New York—Jacksonville, to independent operation for the winter season.
