= Palatka station =

Train station in Florida, US

Palatka, FL
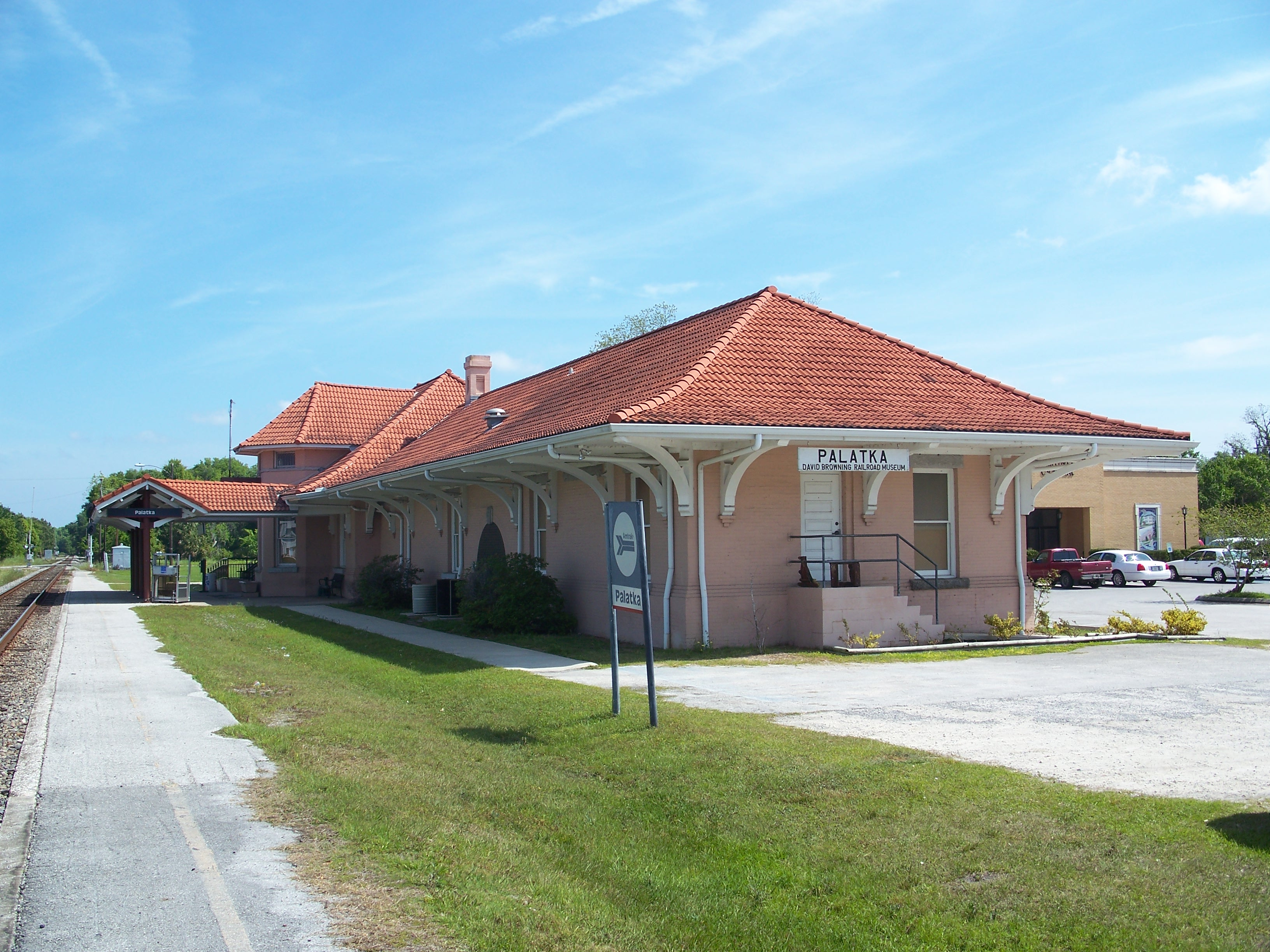
- Palatka station in 2007

General information
- Location: 220 North 11 Street; Palatka, Florida; United States
- Coordinates: 29°39′00″N 81°38′26″W
- Owner: City of Palatka
- Lines: CSX Sanford Subdivision
- Platforms: 1 side platform
- Tracks: 1
- Connections: The Ride Solution

Construction
- Parking: 15 long term and 5 short term parking spaces
- Accessible: Yes

Other information
- Station code: Amtrak: PAK

History
- Opened: May 1909

Passengers
- FY2021: 7,171 (Amtrak)

Services
| Preceding station | Amtrak | Following station |
|---|---|---|
| DeLand toward Miami | Floridian | Jacksonville toward Chicago |
| DeLand toward Miami | Silver Meteor | Jacksonville toward New York |
Auto Train does not stop here
Former services
| Preceding station | Amtrak | Following station |
|---|---|---|
| Jacksonville toward Los Angeles | Sunset Limited 1993–2005 | DeLand toward Orlando or Miami |
| DeLand toward Miami | Silver Star until 2024 | Jacksonville toward New York |
| Preceding station | Atlantic Coast Line Railroad | Following station |
| Satsuma toward Tampa | Main Line | Bostwick toward Richmond |
| Francis toward Rochelle | Rochelle – Palatka | Terminus |
| Preceding station | Southern Railway | Following station |
| A.C.L. Junction toward Valdosta | Valdosta – Palatka | Terminus |
| Preceding station | Florida East Coast Railway | Following station |
| Terminus | Palatka Branch until 1950 | East Palatka toward St. Augustine or Bunnell |
- Old A.C.L. Union Depot
- U.S. National Register of Historic Places
- Location: Palatka, Florida
- Built: 1909
- NRHP reference No.: 88000162
- Added to NRHP: 1988
Location

Palatka station is an Amtrak train station in Palatka, Florida. It is served by the daily Floridian and Silver Meteor trains. The 1908-built station houses the Palatka Railroad Preservation Society and the David Browning Railroad Museum. It was added to the National Register of Historic Places in 1988 as Old A.C.L. Union Depot.

== History ==
The station was built in 1908 for the Atlantic Coast Line Railroad (ACL) and was constructed in the Richardsonian Romanesque style. It served as a union depot for the ACL's Jacksonville-Tampa-Sarasota mainline as well as for the Florida Southern Railway and the Georgia Southern and Florida Railway. In addition to local service to Sarasota, the station served the ACL's West Coast Champion (New York City – Sarasota). Until 1936, the station also served passenger trains operated by the Florida East Coast Railway, whose trains crossed the St. Johns river over a railway bridge in Palatka. This railway bridge was removed in the 1950s. In 1914 the station began to serve the short-lived Ocklawaha Valley Railroad. In 1988, it was added to the National Register of Historic Places.

In 1971, most passenger service in the United States was transferred to Amtrak, however Palatka had its stop discontinued. In 1976, Amtrak decided to reinstate the stop at Palatka, under a trial period. They would later add Palatka as a permanent stop in 1979.

In November 2021, the US Department of Transportation awarded $1.5 billion in RAISE discretionary grants for infrastructure projects around the nation. One such grant awarded $8.2 million to fund the development of the A. Philip Randolph Regional Multimodal Transportation Hub. Under this redevelopment, the station's platform will be lengthened to accommodate a baggage area and raised to meet accessible requirements, and to allow bicycles to be loaded and unloaded at the station. Other improvements around the station include resurfacing the roadway, installing new accessible-compliant sidewalks and curb and gutter, designating bike lanes, and adding other accessory safety improvements in the project area.

On November 10, 2024, the Silver Star was merged with the Capitol Limited as the Floridian.

The station is home to the David Browning Railroad Museum, operated by the Palatka Railroad Preservation Society. The museum features a model train layout, historic documents, photographs, maps, signs and railroad artifacts.
