= Thalmann, Georgia =

Coordinates: 31°17′27″N 81°41′19″W

Thalmann is a sparsely populated town in Glynn County, Georgia located along Georgia Highway 32. The town consists of several ruined and abandoned buildings, a small baptist church and several residents.

== Images of Thalmann, GA ==
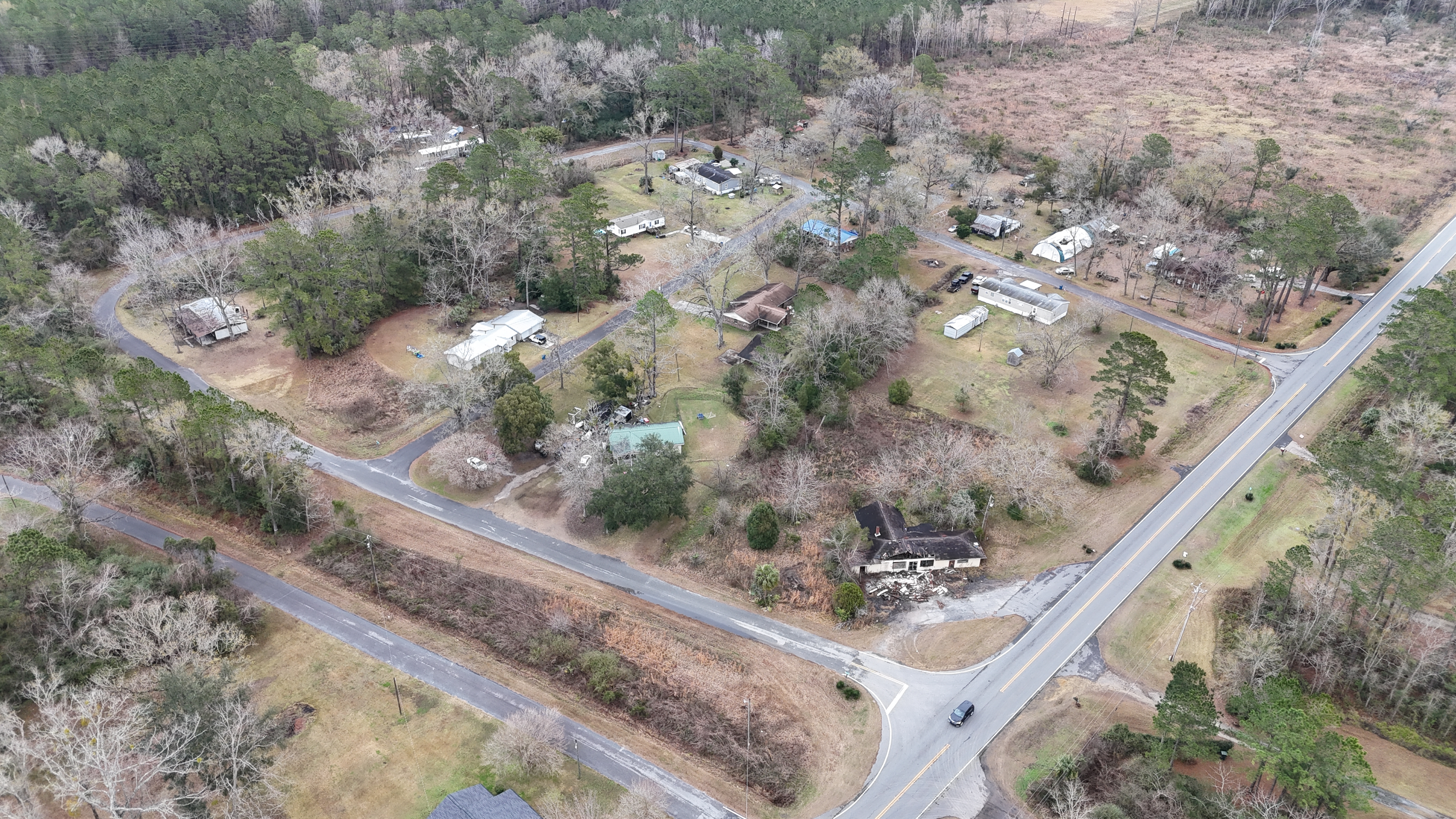
Aerial Photograph of the town of Thalmann

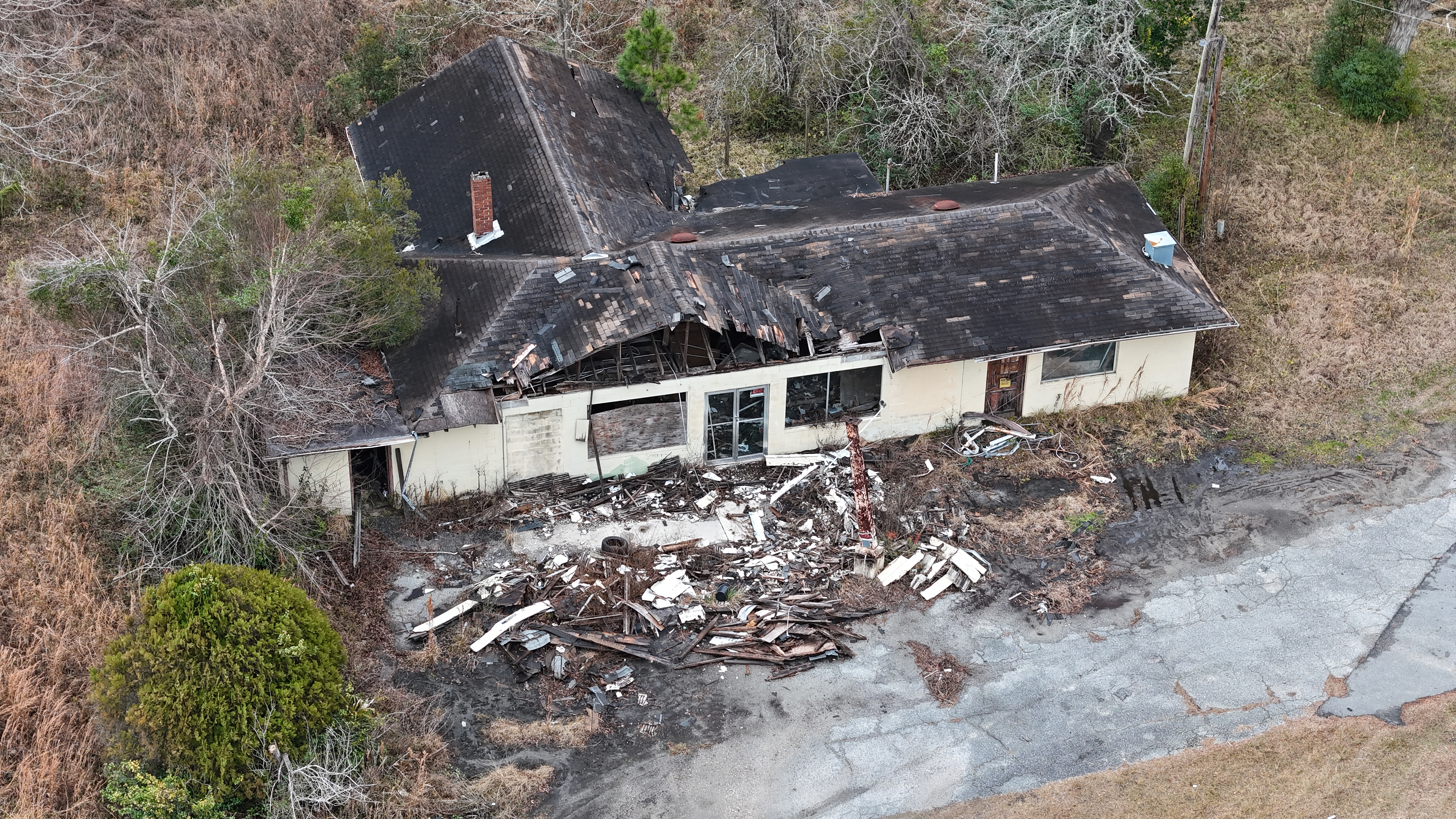
Derelict building in Thalmann

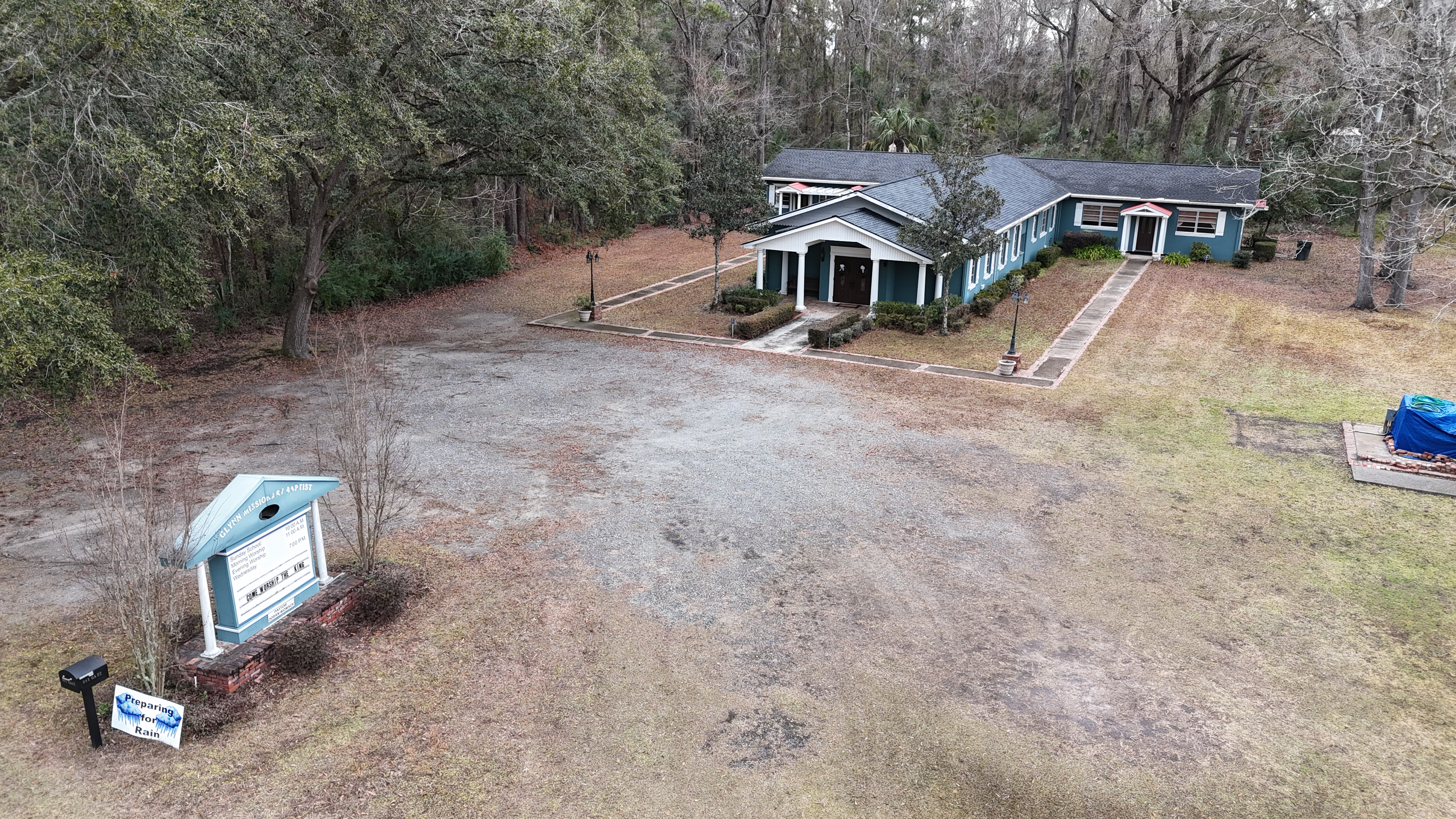
Baptist church in Thalmann

== History ==
Thalmann has been settled since the 18th century. Throughout its history, Thalmann has been an important travel route location, serving as a route for soldiers during the American Revolutionary War and later as an early mail system route, then a stagecoach route.

== Decline ==
In the 1970s, Thalmann was a vacation destination, known for its wildlife. In 1979, a railroad station in the town was rerouted to nearby Jesup, drawing tourist traffic away from the town. By 2001, Thalmann had a population of only approximately 50 residents.

== See also ==
- List of ghost towns in Georgia
