= The Ride Solution =

Non-profit agency

- Founded: 1986
- Headquarters: 220 North Eleventh Street, Palatka, FL
- Service area: Putnam County, Florida
- Service type: bus service, express bus service, vanpool, paratransit
- Routes: 5
- Hubs: 1
- Operations Manager: Myra Strange
- Website: theridesolution.org

The Ride Solution is a non-profit agency that provides public transportation in the city of Palatka, as well as other communities in Putnam County, Florida. The Palatka Union Depot serves as the systems hub, offering access to Greyhound and Amtrak routes. Inter-county routes connect Putnam County to Jacksonville's JTA transit system, and the Gainesville Regional Transit System. Due to the diffused population and rural nature of Putnam County, adequate public transportation is difficult to accomplish. As such, a secondary goal of Ride Solution is to address rural transportation issues.

== Public Transit ==
- Regular bus service - City bus routes are offered in the Greater Palatka area
- Express bus service - Direct destination services with minimal intermediate stops are offered throughout the county. Inter-county express routes are also available.
- Paratransit services - special transport for the disabled and elderly.
- Vanpool - Similar to a carpool, vanpools are the most cost effective mode of public transportation in the United States.
- Park-n-Ride - Parking facilities are available in combination with express bus service.

== Innovations ==
- Brevi Project - Advanced rural low floor vehicle

== Route Listings ==
=== Bus Route ===
- Palatka City Route

=== Express Routes ===
- SP (South Putnam Route) Palatka / Welaka / Crescent City
- CC (Cross County) Interlachen / Palatka / Satsuma

=== Inter-county Routes ===
- PC50 (Choice Ride) Palatka / Green Cove Springs / Orange Park
- PG (Palatka to Gainesville Express) Palatka / Interlachen / Gainesville (limited service)
- SAG (St. Augustine to Gainesville Express) St. Augustine / Palatka / Gainesville
