= BestBus =

American intercity bus service company

- Founded: 2007
- Service area: Washington, D.C., Maryland, Virginia, Delaware, New York City
- Service type: Intercity bus
- Operator: DC Trails
- Website: http://www.bestbus.com/

BestBus (formerly DC2NY) is a low-cost intercity bus service operating in the Mid-Atlantic states of the United States. The company provides regular service between the Washington, D.C. metropolitan area and New York City. During the summer season, BestBus also operates weekend routes connecting Washington, D.C., and New York City with the Delaware Beaches. The brand originally functioned as a marketing label while service was operated by independent contractors. In 2018, BestBus was acquired by the charter company DC Trails and subsequently brought operations in-house.

== Service ==
BestBus operates low-cost intercity bus service between various locations in the Mid-Atlantic states. There is daily service connecting Washington, D.C., to New York City. Daily service also operates from Manassas, Vienna, and Springfield in Virginia to New York City. On summer weekends, BestBus operates service from Washington, D.C., and New York City to the Delaware Beaches towns of Rehoboth Beach and Dewey Beach.

BestBus offers free Wi-Fi, electric plugs at every seat, free bottled water, and on-board restrooms. All bus riders are guaranteed a seat when boarding.

== Stop locations ==
City	Stop location(s)	Source
Washington, D.C.	Union Station	
Washington, D.C.	Dupont Circle	
Manassas, Virginia	Cushing Road commuter lot	
Springfield, Virginia	Franconia–Springfield Metro Station	
Vienna, Virginia	Vienna Metro Station	
New York City	417 West 34th Street in Midtown Manhattan	
Dewey Beach, Delaware	Hyatt Place at 1301 Coastal Highway	
Rehoboth Beach, Delaware	219 Rehoboth Avenue	

== History ==
DC2NY was founded by Asi Ohana and Richard Green in 2007 to offer low-cost intercity bus service between Washington, D.C., and New York City. In 2010, DC2NY began summer weekend service from Washington, D.C., to the Delaware Beaches. DC2NY started summer weekend service between New York City and the Delaware Beaches in 2013. In May 2014, the company was renamed to BestBus and added seven new stops. In July 2014, BestBus began service from Manassas, Vienna, and Springfield in Virginia to New York City.

On the evening of January 19, 2026, a bus headed to Union Station in Washington, DC was allegedly driven off the scheduled route and towards the wrong destination by a relief bus driver; increasingly concerned passengers argued with the agitated bus driver, contacted the bus company for help, posted the events live on Bluesky, and, eventually, called the police to no avail, before the driver finally stopped and allowed passengers to disembark in Vienna, Virginia.
