= Savannah Subdivision =

Railway line in Georgia, USA

The Savannah Subdivision is a railroad line owned by CSX Transportation in the U.S. state of Georgia. Through the middle of Savannah, the Savannah Subdivision splits into an east route and a west route. The East Route runs from Savannah, Georgia, to Ogeechee, Georgia, for a total of 15.6 miles (25.1 km). At its north end it continues south from the Charleston Subdivision and the Columbia Subdivision both of the Florence Division and at its south end it continues south as the Nahunta Subdivision. The West Route is located in Savannah, Georgia, and is 9.7 miles (15.6 km) in length. At its north end it branches off of the Savannah Subdivision East Route and at its south end it comes back into the Savannah Subdivision East Route.

== History ==
The East Route runs along CSX's A Line (which was the main route of the Atlantic Coast Line Railroad, one of CSX's predecessor companies). The West Route runs along what remains of CSX's S Line (which was the main route of the Seaboard Air Line Railroad, another CSX predecessor company)

The A Line north of Savannah was originally chartered in 1854 by the Charleston and Savannah Railroad (later known as the Charleston and Savannah Railway). South of Savannah, it was originally the Atlantic and Gulf Railroad, which was chartered in 1856. Both lines came under the ownership of Henry B. Plant in the 1880s. The Plant System would then be bought by the Atlantic Coast Line Railroad in 1902.

The S Line north of Savannah was originally built as the South Bound Railroad in 1891. South of Savannah, the line was a northern extension of the Florida Central and Peninsular Railroad built in 1894. The FC&P leased the South Bound Railroad and eventually acquired it. The FC&P became part of the Seaboard Air Line Railroad in 1903. The Seaboard Air Line main line within Savannah was designated on employee timetables as its Orange Subdivision.

The Atlantic Coast Line and Seaboard Air Line merged in 1967, which created the Seaboard Coast Line Railroad. After the merger, the main lines in Savannah were named the Burroughs Subdivision. The merger led to consolidation of the two lines and the abandonment of some of the S Line in Savannah. This includes the segment from Savannah south to Ogeechee which originally ran right beside the Atlantic Coast Line route (the current route). Remnants of the Seaboard's bridge over the Ogeechee River remain next to the current bridge.

In 1980, the Seaboard Coast Line's parent company merged with the Chessie System, creating the CSX Corporation. The CSX Corporation initially operated the Chessie and Seaboard Systems separately until 1986, when they were merged into CSX Transportation. By the time CSX was created, the line was renamed the Savannah Subdivision (a name the Seaboard Air Line Railroad had once used on their line from Savannah east to Americus).

== See also ==
- List of CSX Transportation lines
