= Seaboard Air Line Depot =

The Seaboard Air Line Depot can refer to the following former and active train stations previously used by the Seaboard Air Line Railroad, many of which are listed on the National Register of Historic Places:

== Alabama ==
- Birmingham Terminal Station
- Union Station (Montgomery, Alabama)

== Florida ==
- Apopka Seaboard Air Line Railway Depot
- Auburndale (SAL station) (Auburndale, Florida)
- Bay Pines (SAL station)
- Belleview (SAL station) (Belleview, Florida)
- Charlotte Harbor and Northern Railway Depot (Boca Grande)
- Clearwater station (Amtrak)
- Deerfield Beach Seaboard Air Line Railway Station
- Delray Beach Seaboard Air Line Railway Station
- Fort Lauderdale Seaboard Air Line Railway Station
- Fort Myers (SAL station)
- Old Gainesville Depot
- Hawthorne (SAL station)
- Hialeah Seaboard Air Line Railway Station
- Hollywood (SAL station)
- Homestead Seaboard Air Line Railway Station
- Inverness (SAL station)
- Largo (SAL station)
- Leesburg (SAL station)
- Live Oak Union Depot
- Naples Railroad Depot
- Ocala Union Station
- Okeechobee (Amtrak station)
- Opa-locka Seaboard Air Line Railway Station
- Orlando (SAL station)
- Plant City Union Depot
- Sarasota (SAL station)
- Old Sebring Seaboard Air Line Depot
- Seaboard Coast Line Railroad station (St. Petersburg, Florida)
- Tallahassee (Amtrak station)
- Union Station (Tampa, Florida)
- Venice Seaboard Air Line Depot
- Waldo (Amtrak station)
- West Lake Wales (SAL station)
- West Palm Beach (Tri-Rail station)
- Wildwood (Amtrak station)
- Williston (SAL station)
- Winter Haven (Amtrak station)
- Yulee (SAL station)

== Georgia ==
- Athens (SAL station)
- Terminal Station (Atlanta)
- Colbert (SAL station)
- Comer (SAL station)
- Elberton (SAL station)
- Emory (SAL station)
- Lawrenceville (SAL station)
- Plains (SAL station)
- Rockmart (SAL station)
- Union Station (Savannah)
- Tucker (SAL station)
- Winder (SAL station)

== North Carolina ==
- Apex (SAL station)
- Bladenboro (SAL station)
- Bostic (SAL station)
- Caroleen (SAL station)
- Charlotte (SAL station)
- Seaboard Air Line Railway Depot (Cherryville, North Carolina), listed on the NRHP in Gaston County, North Carolina
- Clarkton (SAL station)
- Colon (SAL station)
- Conway (SAL station)
- Creedmore (SAL station)
- Ellenboro (SAL station)
- Franklinton (SAL station)
- Gibson (SAL station)
- Gumberry (SAL station)
- Hamlet (SAL station) (Hamlet, North Carolina)
- Henderson (SAL station)
- Hoffman (SAL station)
- Kelford (SAL station)
- Latimore (SAL station)
- Lumberton (SAL station)
- Matthews (SAL station)
- Maxton (SAL station)
- Monroe (SAL station)
- Pendelton (SAL station)
- Polkton (SAL station)
- Union Station (Raleigh, North Carolina)
- Roanoke Rapids (SAL station)
- Rockingham (SAL station)
- Sanford (SAL station)
- Southern Pines (SAL station)
- Vaughan (SAL station)
- Wadesboro (SAL station)
- Waxhaw (SAL station)
- Weldon (SAL station)

== South Carolina ==
- Abbeville (SAL station)
- Calhoun (SAL station)
- Camden (SAL station)
- Charleston (SAL station)
- Cheraw (SAL station)
- Chester (SAL station)
- Clinton (SAL station)
- Columbia (SAL station)
- Darlington (SAL station)
- Denmark (SAL station)
- Elgin (SAL station)
- Estill (SAL station)
- Fairfax (SAL station)
- Florence (SAL station)
- Greenwood (SAL station)
- Jamestown (SAL station)
- Lamar (SAL station)
- Livingston (SAL station)
- Lugoff (SAL station)
- Seaboard Air Line Railway Depot in McBee
- North, South Carolina (SAL station)
- Seaboard Air Line Railway Depot in Patrick
- Prichard (SAL station)
- Sycamore (SAL station)
- Timmonsville (SAL station)
- Woodford (SAL station)

== Virginia ==
- Broad Street Station (Richmond)
- Richmond Main Street Station
- Seaboard Coastline Building (Portsmouth)
