= Miami Subdivision =

Historic railroad line in Florida

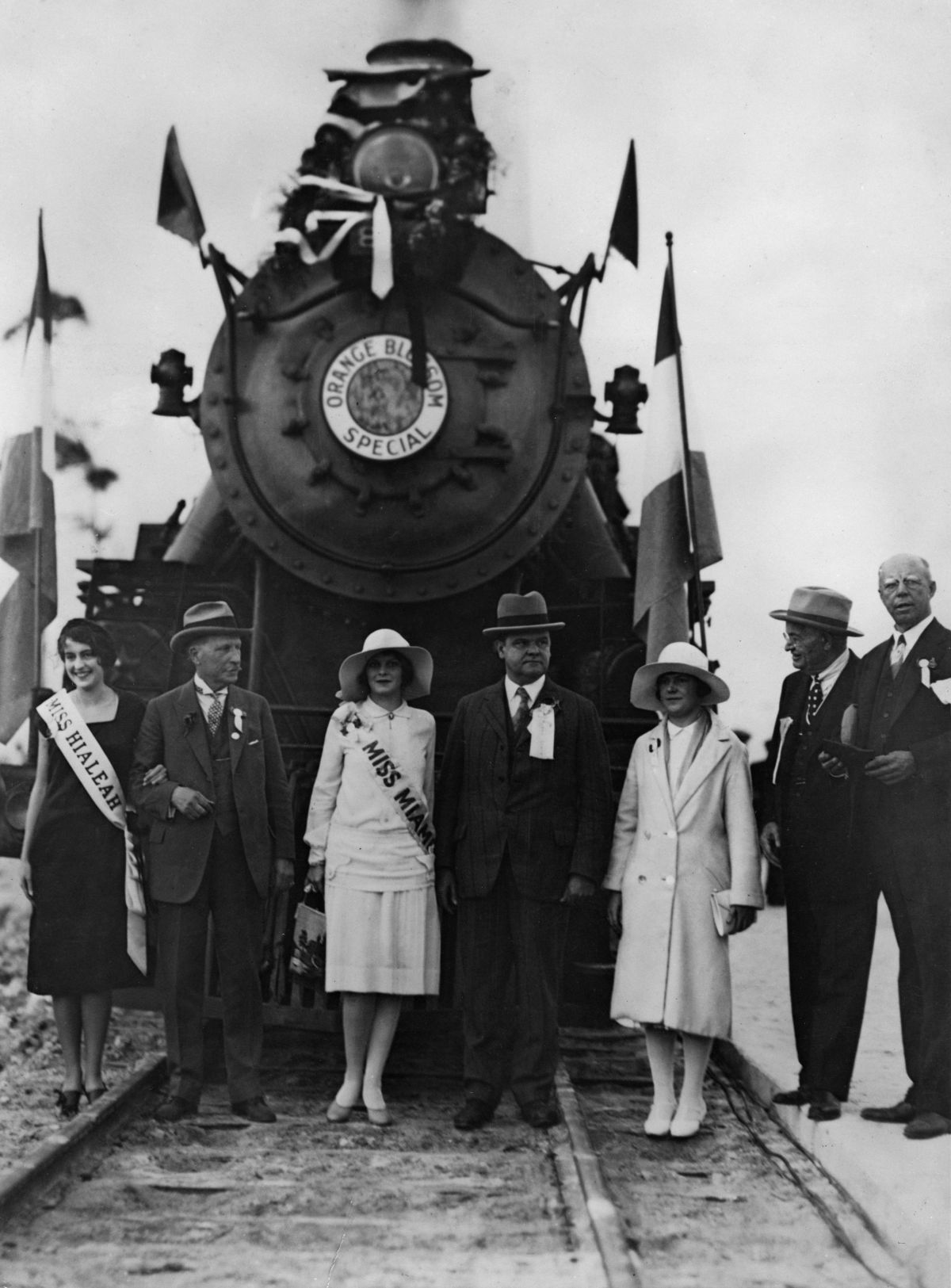
- Inaugural Orange Blossom Special train in Miami in 1927

Overview
- Status: Portions still operating under successor company
- Owner: Seaboard Air Line Railroad
- Termini: Wildwood, Florida; Miami, Florida

History
- Opened: 1926

Technical
- Line length: 273.9 mi (440.8 km)
- Track gauge: 1,435 mm (4 ft 8 1/2 in) standard gauge
- Electrification: No
- Signalling: None

The Seaboard Air Line Railroad's Miami Subdivision was a railroad line in Florida connecting the network to the city of Miami. Officially beginning in Wildwood on the company's Main Line, the Miami Subdivision split from the Main Line five miles south of Wildwood in Coleman and ran through rural Central Florida before reaching South Florida and Miami, a distance of 273 miles. The Miami Subdivision was built during the Florida land boom of the 1920s and a vast majority of the line is still in service today. It is now CSX Transportation's Auburndale Subdivision from Auburndale to Mangonia Park and the state-owned South Florida Rail Corridor south of there.

== Route description ==
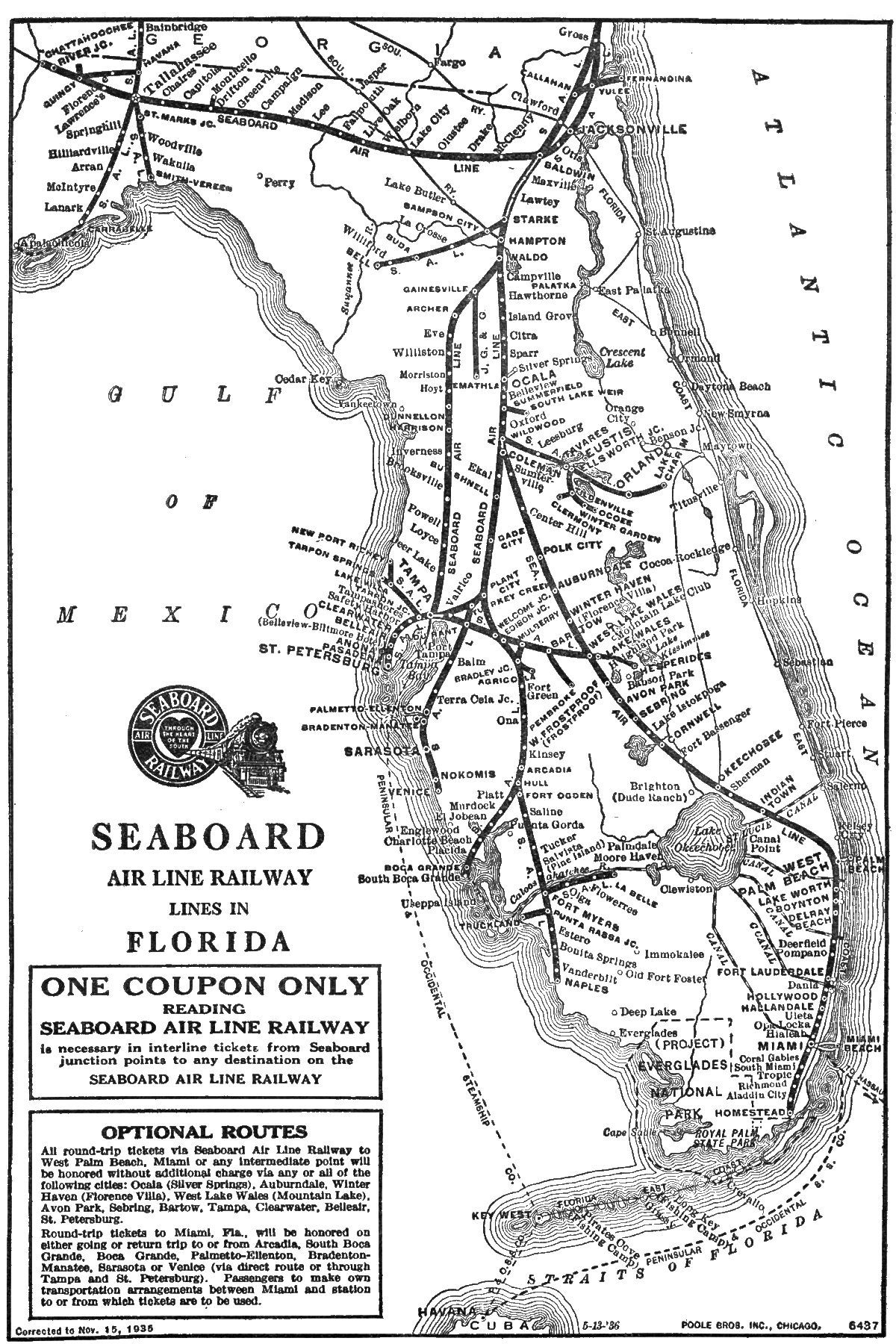
1936 map of Seaboard Air Line network in Florida, including the Miami Subdivision

The Miami Subdivision began in Wildwood on the Seaboard Air Line's Main Line, where they had a passenger depot and a large classification yard. From Wildwood, the Miami Subdivision ran down the Main Line five miles to Coleman (which was double-tracked between these two locations). In Coleman, the Miami Subdivision split from the Main Line and turned south-southeast, while the Main Line continued southwest to Tampa. From Coleman, the Miami Subdivision passed through Center Hill and continued south through wetlands of north Central Florida down to Polk City and Auburndale. In Auburndale, it crossed the Main Line of the Atlantic Coast Line Railroad, one of the Seaboard's competitors.

From Auburndale, the line continued south through Winter Haven and West Lake Wales. At West Lake Wales, it crossed the Seaboard Air Line's Valrico Subdivision, which provided a route west toward Tampa. Further south, it continued through southern Central Florida, passing through Avon Park and Sebring where closely paralleled the rival Atlantic Coast Line Railroad's Haines City Branch.

After Sebring, the line turned east and southeast to Okeechobee. From here, it continued southeast near the northern edge of Lake Okeechobee in a nearly straight line, passing through Indiantown before turning south as it entered West Palm Beach.

From West Palm Beach, the line continued south along a route largely paralleling the Florida East Coast Railway (FEC), which existed a few miles closer to the coast. The Seaboard line ran just to the west of the central areas of Boynton, Delray, Boca Raton, Deerfield, Fort Lauderdale, and Hollywood.

At Port Everglades Junction just south of Fort Lauderdale, the Port Everglades Belt Line Railroad connected the Seaboard line with Port Everglades, which opened in 1928. The Port Everglades Belt Line ran east to the port along the current route of Interstate 595.

South of Hollywood, the line turned southwest through Opa-locka before turning back south through Hialeah. In Hialeah, the line crossed the Florida East Coast Railway's Little River Branch, a junction which is known today as Iris Interlocking. A freight yard and maintenance shops were also located in Hialeah, along with a connection to the company's Homestead Subdivision.

South of Hialeah, the line turned southeast along the Miami Canal toward downtown Miami. A passenger depot serving Miami was built at 2206 NW 7th Ave in the Allapattah neighborhood. Track would continue beyond the passenger depot south and east into downtown. It crossed the FEC's main line near NW 11th Street and connected with the Miami Municipal Railway, which continued the line a short distance to the city docks at Miami's original port (located at the site of Museum Park).

== History ==
=== Planning and construction to West Palm Beach ===
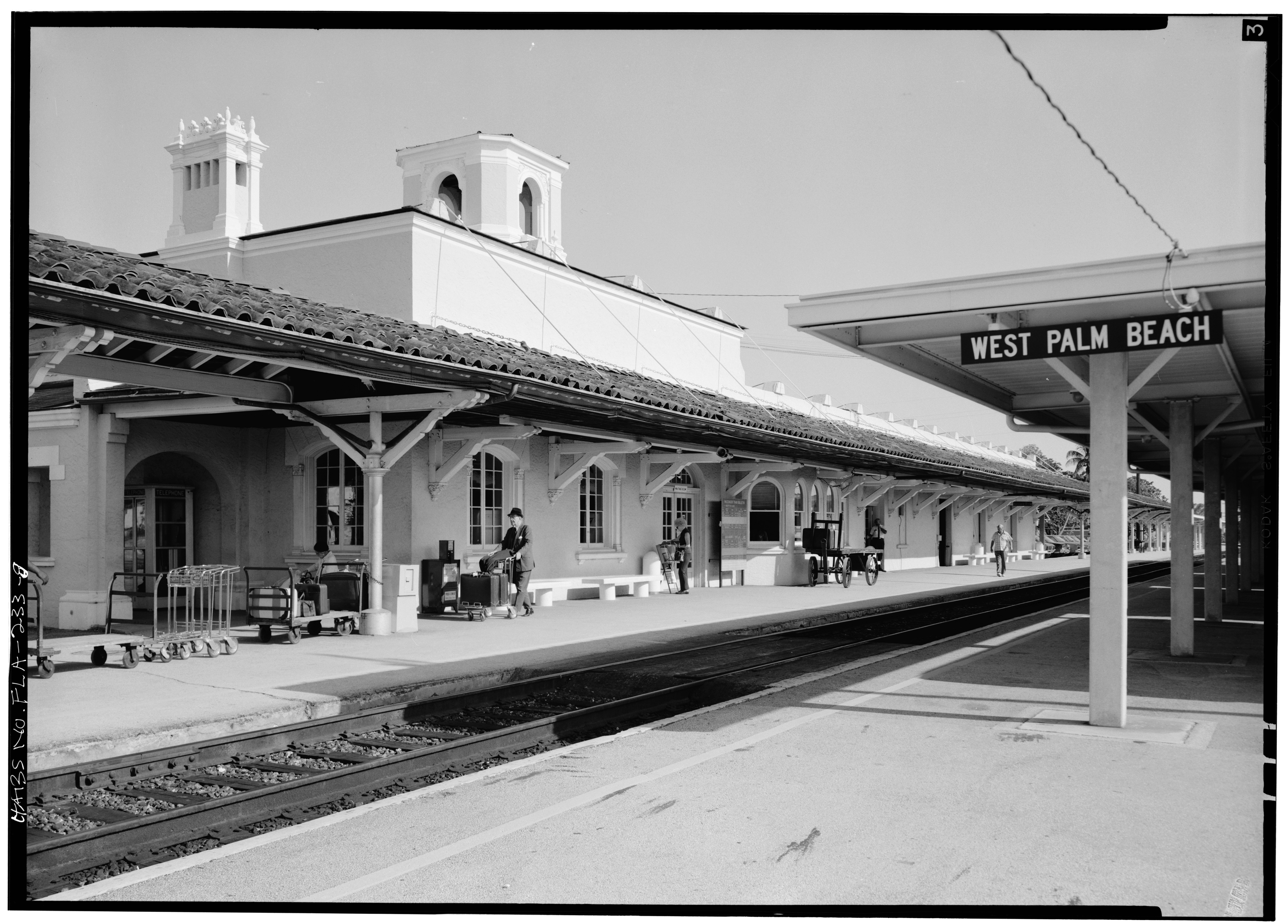
West Palm Beach depot

As the Florida land boom of the 1920s was underway, S. Davies Warfield, the president of the Seaboard Air Line Railroad (known then as the Seaboard Air Line Railway), sought to expand the railroad's network to the South Florida region, which for almost thirty years had been the exclusive domain of the Florida East Coast Railway.

In April 1924, the Seaboard Air Line chartered a subsidiary company, the Florida Western and Northern Railroad, to oversee the construction of a line from the company's main line in Coleman south and southeast to West Palm Beach. The Jefferson Construction Company of Charleston, South Carolina was contracted to construct the line and the American Bridge Company supplied swing bridge spans for bridges over the Kissimmee River and the St. Lucie Canal. Most of the passenger depots along the line were designed by Harvey and Clarke, an architectural firm based in West Palm Beach.

The line's final spike was placed on January 21, 1925, and four days later, a special section of the Seaboard's Orange Blossom Special ran to West Palm Beach officially inaugurating service. President Warfield was on board with around 500 guests.

=== Extension to Miami ===
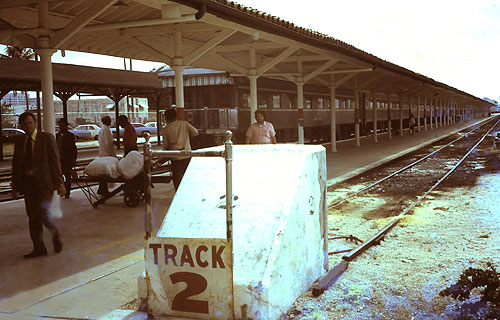
Original Miami depot in 1973

The line would only terminate in West Palm Beach for a short time. In June 1925, only five months after opening, the Seaboard Air Line organized another subsidiary, the Seaboard-All Florida Railway, to extend the line south to Miami. The company gave the construction contract for the extension to Foley Brothers of St. Paul, Minnesota, who was one of the largest railroad contractors in the country at the time.

The extension to Miami was complete in late 1926. On January 8, 1927, the Miami extension officially opened for passenger service. On opening day, President S. Davies Warfield rode aboard a special section of the Seaboard's Orange Blossom Special with a number of special guests and dignitaries including Florida Governor John W. Martin and Dorothy Walker Bush, mother of future U.S. President George H. W. Bush. The train stopped at points along the lines for public ovation with many people attending. The day before, the same train inaugurated service on the Seaboard Air Line's extension on the west coast of Florida to Fort Myers and Naples (the Fort Myers Subdivision). The two-day celebration of the opening of both lines is considered to be one of the largest public relations events in the history of American railroads.

To accommodate large amounts of traffic bound for Miami, the Seaboard Air Line also double-tracked its main line from Wildwood to Coleman. Upon completion of the Miami extension, the Seaboard Air Line would officially designate the full line from Wildwood to Miami as the Miami Subdivision.

=== Early years ===
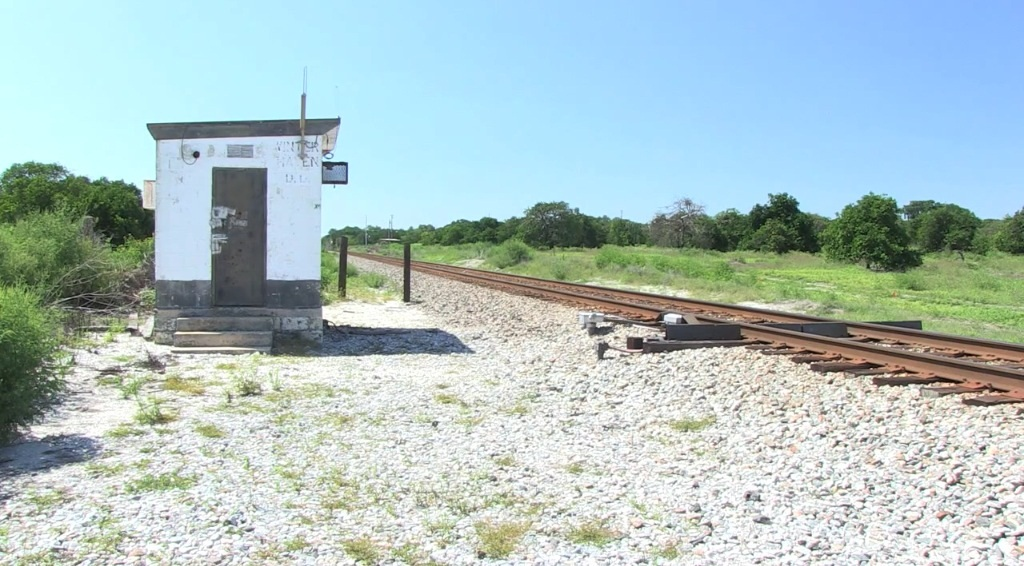
Track and defect detector in Winter Haven as seen in 2013

The Seaboard Air Line ran a number of intercity passenger services to Miami on the line including the Orange Blossom Special, Silver Meteor, Silver Star, the Sunland, the Palmland. The Cross Florida Limited also ran the line as the first direct rail service between Miami and Tampa. The Cross Florida Limited would run east to Tampa at West Lake Wales on the Valrico Subdivision.

A freight yard and maintenance shops were built just northwest of Miami in Hialeah. They were originally located just south Hialeah Junction, which was located less than a mile south of the Hialeah station. From Hialeah Junction, the yard was accessed via a branch track south, which crossed the Miami Canal on a bascule drawbridge and then turned west at a wye where it entered the yard. By the end of 1927, the Seaboard built the Homestead Subdivision from the original Hialeah Yard south to Homestead. The original freight yard was located at the east end of the current Runway 8R/26L at Miami International Airport (which opened in 1929 as the smaller Pan American Field). In 1951, the Dade County Port Authority paid $3 million to relocate Seaboard's Hialeah yard to its current location north of Iris Interlocking and realign the Homestead Subdivision to allow for expansion of the airport.

By 1964, Miami's original port was largely replaced by PortMiami on Dodge Island. Tracks east of the station to the original port would eventually be removed.

=== Mergers and later years ===
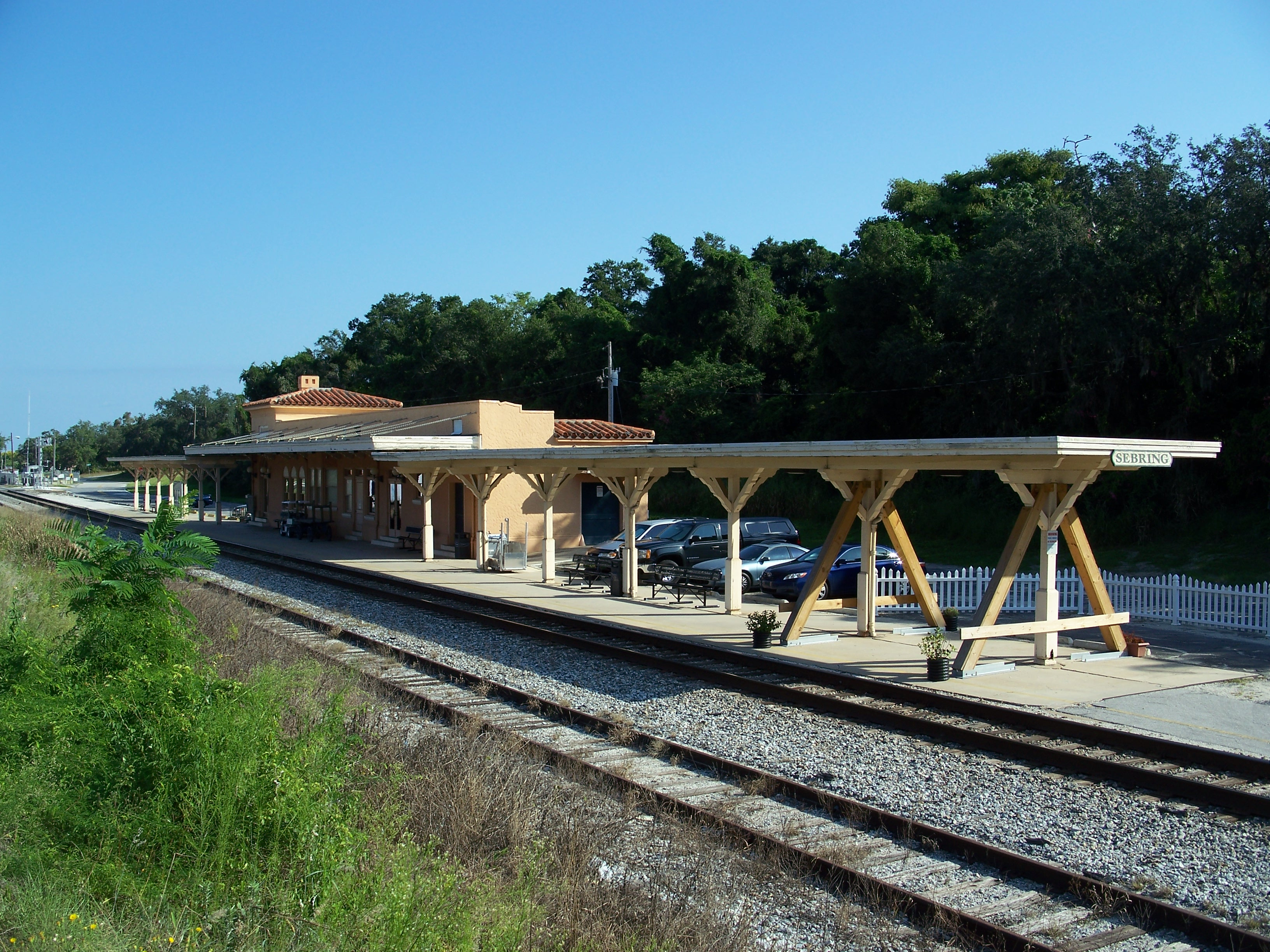
Seaboard Air Line station in Sebring, which is still used by Amtrak

In 1963, the line began hosting the Atlantic Coast Line Railroad's Miami-bound passenger trains. The Atlantic Coast Line Railroad was the Seaboard Air Line's main competitor in Central Florida and the West Coast of the state. This arrangement was quickly made due to the abrupt discontinuation of passenger service on the Florida East Coast Railway, who previously handled the Atlantic Coast Line's Miami trains. By then, merger talks were underway between the Atlantic Coast Line and the Seaboard Air Line. The merger would be complete by 1967 and the new combined company would be named the Seaboard Coast Line Railroad.

The Miami Subdivision continued operation and remained mostly unchanged through the Seaboard Coast Line (SCL) era. It became their main route through southern Central Florida and segments of the Atlantic Coast Line's parallel Haines City Branch were abandoned. Remaining segments of the Haines City branch became smaller branches of the Miami Subdivision including a short branch into Avon Park, as well as trackage now operated by the Florida Midland Railroad (Lake Wales to Frostproof) and the South Central Florida Express.

In 1971, all of the Seaboard Coast Line's intercity passenger service was taken over by Amtrak who still operate to Miami on the remaining line today. In the 1970s, Interstate 95 was built through South Florida, which was mostly built beside the Seaboard tracks between Palm Beach International Airport and Golden Glades. Interstate 595 was completed in 1991 and the line was realigned slightly at the former Port Everglades Junction to accommodate the interchange between I-95 and I-595.

In 1980, the Seaboard Coast Line's parent company merged with the Chessie System, creating the CSX Corporation. The CSX Corporation initially operated the Chessie and Seaboard Systems separately until 1986, when they were merged into CSX Transportation.

In 1983, the Florida Department of Transportation (FDOT) was looking to start temporary commuter rail service between West Palm Beach and Miami while construction crews widened Interstate 95 and Florida's Turnpike. The state's original plan was to use the more urban Florida East Coast Railway for the service, but FEC declined to grant access to its line as they wanted freight to be their top priority. CSX on the other hand was going through a corporate restructuring in 1985 and was seeking to sell or abandon some of its lines. CSX sold the line from West Palm Beach to Miami Airport in May 1988 to FDOT for $264 million. The state-owned segment of the line is now known as the South Florida Rail Corridor.

=== Abandonment north of Auburndale ===
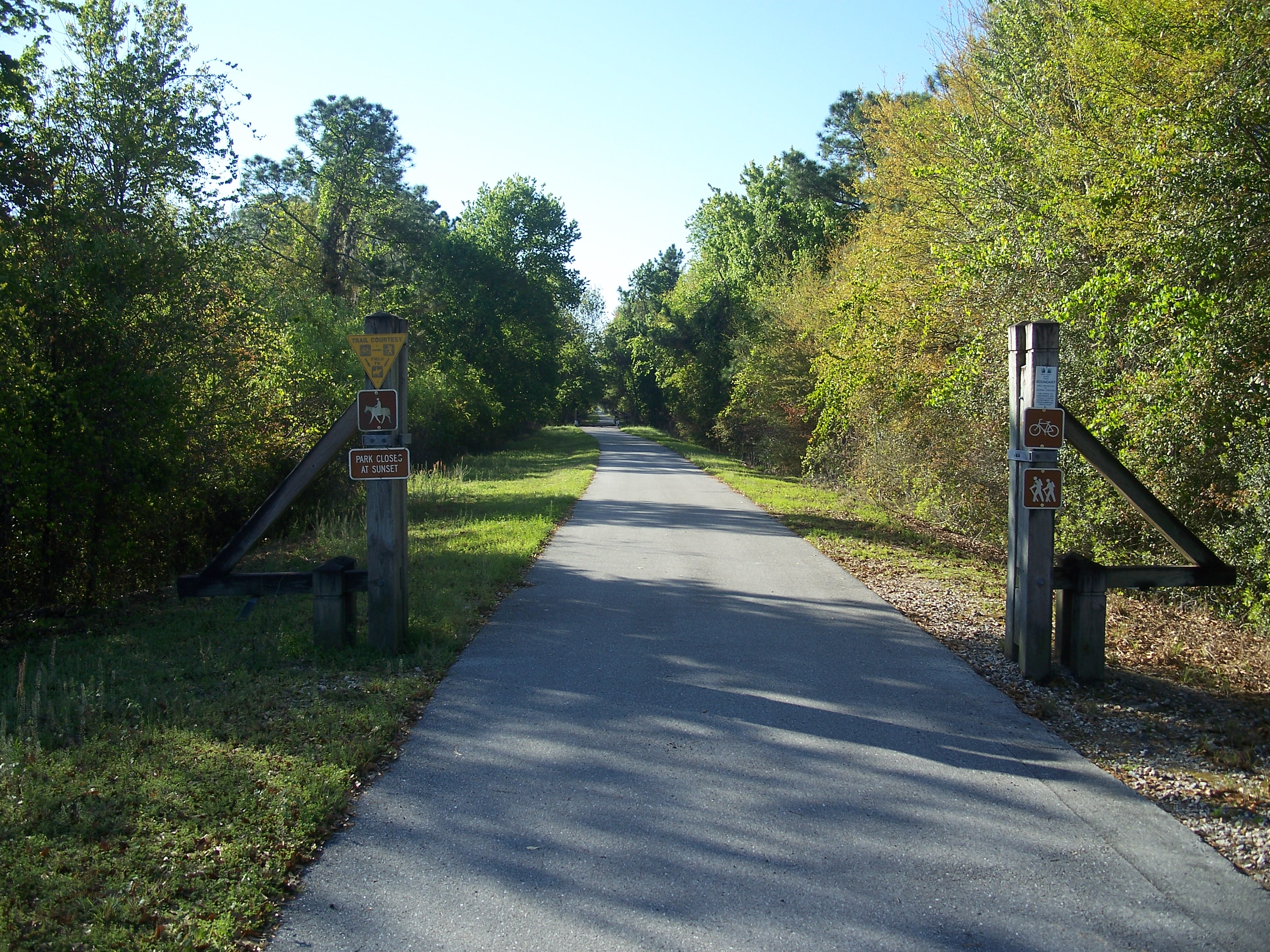
General James A. Van Fleet State Trail on the abandoned segment of the right-of-way north of Auburndale

In 1989, a few years after Seaboard Coast Line became CSX, the northern section of the Miami Subdivision from Coleman to just north of Auburndale was abandoned and removed. It carried Amtrak's Miami service up until its removal, which was then shifted to its current routing along the A Line (the former Atlantic Coast Line Main Line). Most of the former right-of-way of the abandoned northern segment is now part of the nearly 30-mile General James A. Van Fleet State Trail, as well as the adjoining Auburndale TECO Trail.

== Current operations ==
The line from Auburndale south to Hialeah is still in service today. It remains CSX's only rail line to the Miami area and all CSX freight traffic to Miami continues to run the line. All of Amtrak's passenger service to Miami including the Silver Meteor and Floridian service also run the line daily.

=== Auburndale Subdivision ===
CSX has designated the remaining line from Auburndale to Mangonia Park just northwest of West Palm Beach as their Auburndale Subdivision. A short spur known as McDonald Connection now connects the Auburndale Subdivision with the CSX A Line towards Tampa. The Auburndale Subdivision runs in a roughly parallel trajectory to U.S. Route 27 between Avon Park and Sebring, and from Okeechobee to West Palm Beach, the line directly parallels State Road 710 which in some places known as Warfield Boulevard (named after Seaboard president S. Davies Warfield). In 2016, the line's original swing bridge over the Kissimmee River near Fort Basinger was replaced with a fixed bridge.

=== South Florida Rail Corridor ===
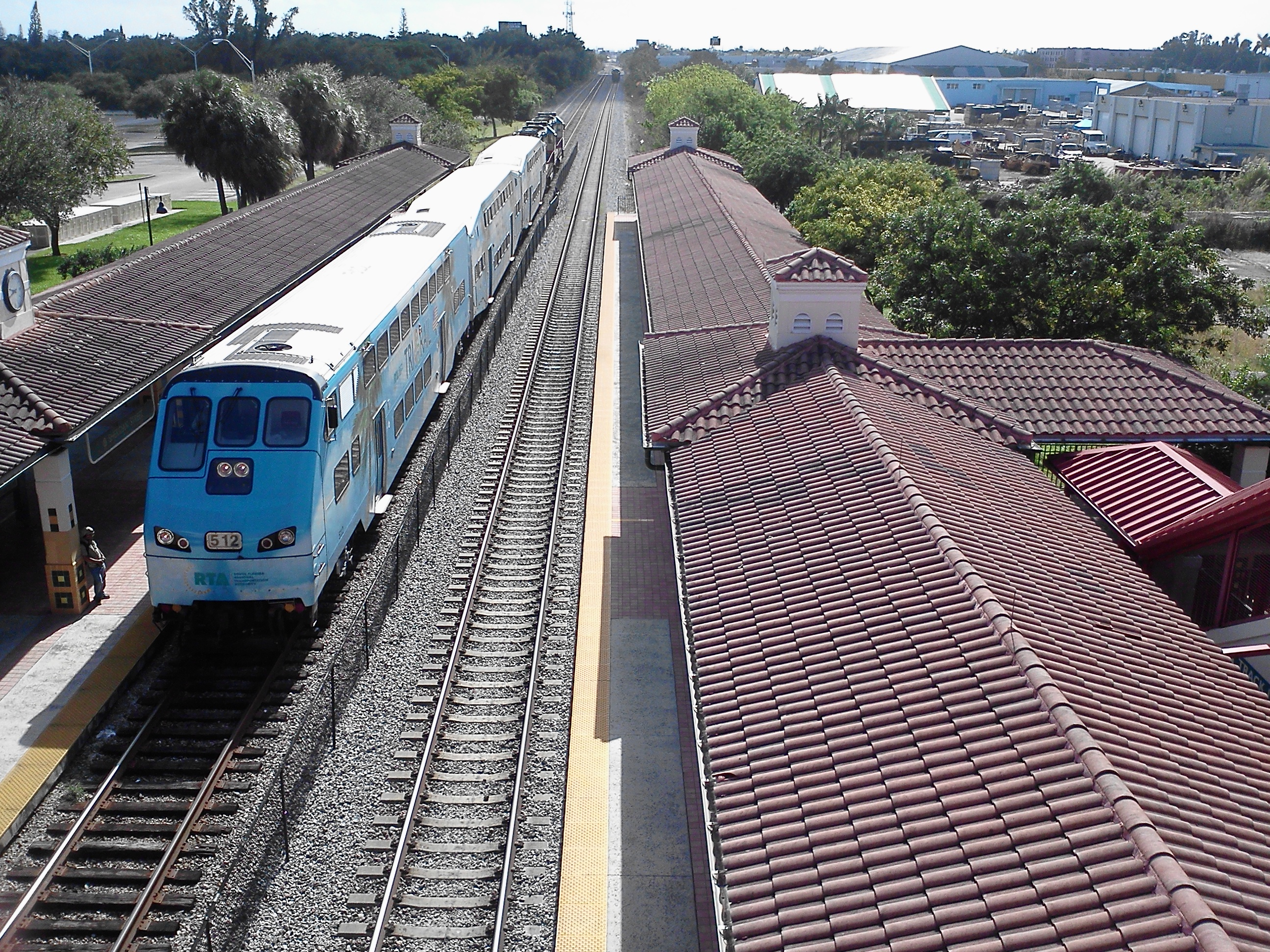
Tri-Rail train on the former Seaboard-All Florida Railway in 2011

The line south of Mangonia Park is now the South Florida Rail Corridor, which is owned by the Florida Department of Transportation. CSX continues to have freight trackage rights on the South Florida Rail Corridor. In addition to CSX and Amtrak, the South Florida Rail Corridor is also used by Tri-Rail, which has operated since January 1989. While initially intended to be temporary, it eventually became a permanent service. CSX continued to maintain and provide dispatching for the South Florida Rail Corridor up until 2015, when FDOT took over those responsibilities. Tri-Rail extended service south to a new station at Miami Airport located at the end of the wye south of the Miami Canal in 1998. This was the first passenger service south of the Miami Canal since passenger service was discontinued on the Homestead Subdivision in 1929. FDOT completed double-tracking the line from West Palm Beach to Hialeah in 2006. Today, the original 1920s Seaboard stations are used by Amtrak and Tri-Rail for service at West Palm Beach, Deerfield Beach, Fort Lauderdale and Hollywood. Though no longer in use, the Seaboard stations at Delray Beach, Opa-locka, and Hialeah are still standing.

Hialeah yard is still used by CSX, and it also contains a car maintenance facility and locomotive shop for both Amtrak and Tri-Rail. Amtrak's current Miami station, which replaced the original Seaboard Miami depot in Allapattah in 1978, is located at the south end of the yard.

The remaining southern end of the line from Hialeah Junction to Downtown Miami is still used by CSX and is now known the Downtown Lead.

== Historic stations ==
Milepost	City	Station	Image	Connections and notes
S 761.5	Wildwood	Wildwood		located on Seaboard Air Line Railroad Main Line
SX 766.1	Coleman	Coleman		junction with Seaboard Air Line Railroad Main Line
SX 777.3	Center Hill	Center Hill		junction with Atlantic Coast Line Railroad High Springs—Croom Line
SX 781.9	Mabel	Mabel		junction with Atlantic Coast Line Railroad Trilby Branch
SX 793.1		Bryan		
SX 800.3		Withla		
SX 808.1		Flanders		
SX 811.6	Polk City	Polk City		
SX 816.8	Auburndale	Noxon		
SX 820.1	Auburndale	Auburndale		former depot relocated to site of the ACL depot in the 2000s junction with Atlantic Coast Line Railroad Main Line
SX 821.4	Auburndale	Oasis		
SX 826.2	Winter Haven	Winter Haven		junction with Atlantic Coast Line Railroad Bartow Branch
SX 835.8		West Lake Wales		junction with Seaboard Air Line Railroad Valrico Subdivision
SX 842.0		Wolfolk		
SX 846.7		West Frostproof		
SX 857.2		Reppard		
SX 858.2	Avon Park	Avon Park		
SX 862.0		Hartt		junction with Atlantic Coast Line Railroad Haines City Branch
SX 867.2	Sebring	Sebring		
SX 870.2		Ridge		
SX 884.7		Plains		
SX 892.3	Fort Basinger	Fort Basinger		
SX 901.7		Mildred		
SX 908.7	Okeechobee	Okeechobee		junction with Florida East Coast Railway Kissimmee Valley Line
SX 914.1		Sherman		
SX 924.7		Zana		
SX 934.5		Elcid		
SX 936.3	Indiantown	Indiantown		
SX 940.3		Yale		
SX 955.4		Delta		
SX 963.8		Agram		
SX 968.1	West Palm Beach	Northwood		
SX 969.9	West Palm Beach	West Palm Beach		
SX 976.5	Lake Worth Beach	Lake Worth		
SX 980.8		Hypoluxo		
SX 983.0	Boynton Beach	Boynton		
SX 987.5	Delray Beach	Delray		
SX 991.1	Boca Raton	Yamato		
SX 998.3	Deerfield Beach	Deerfield		
SX 1004.0	Pompano Beach	Pompano		
SX 1011.1		Carmen		
SX 1012.3	Fort Lauderdale	Fort Lauderdale		
SX 1015.3		Port Everglades Junction		junction with Port Everglades Belt Line Railroad
SX 1016.4	Dania Beach	Dania		
SX 1019.7	Hollywood	Hollywood		
SX 1021.1	Hallandale Beach	Hallandale		
SX 1025.7		Uleta		also known as Miami Plantation
SX 1030.0	Opa-Locka	Opa-Locka		
SX 1034.2	Hialeah	Iris		junction with Florida East Coast Railway Little River Branch
SX 1036.3	Hialeah	Hialeah		
SX 1036.5	Hialeah	Hialeah Junction		junction with Homestead Subdivision
SXD 1040.0	Miami	Miami		replaced by current Miami station in 1977
