= Hamlet station =

Train station in Hamlet, North Carolina

Hamlet, NC
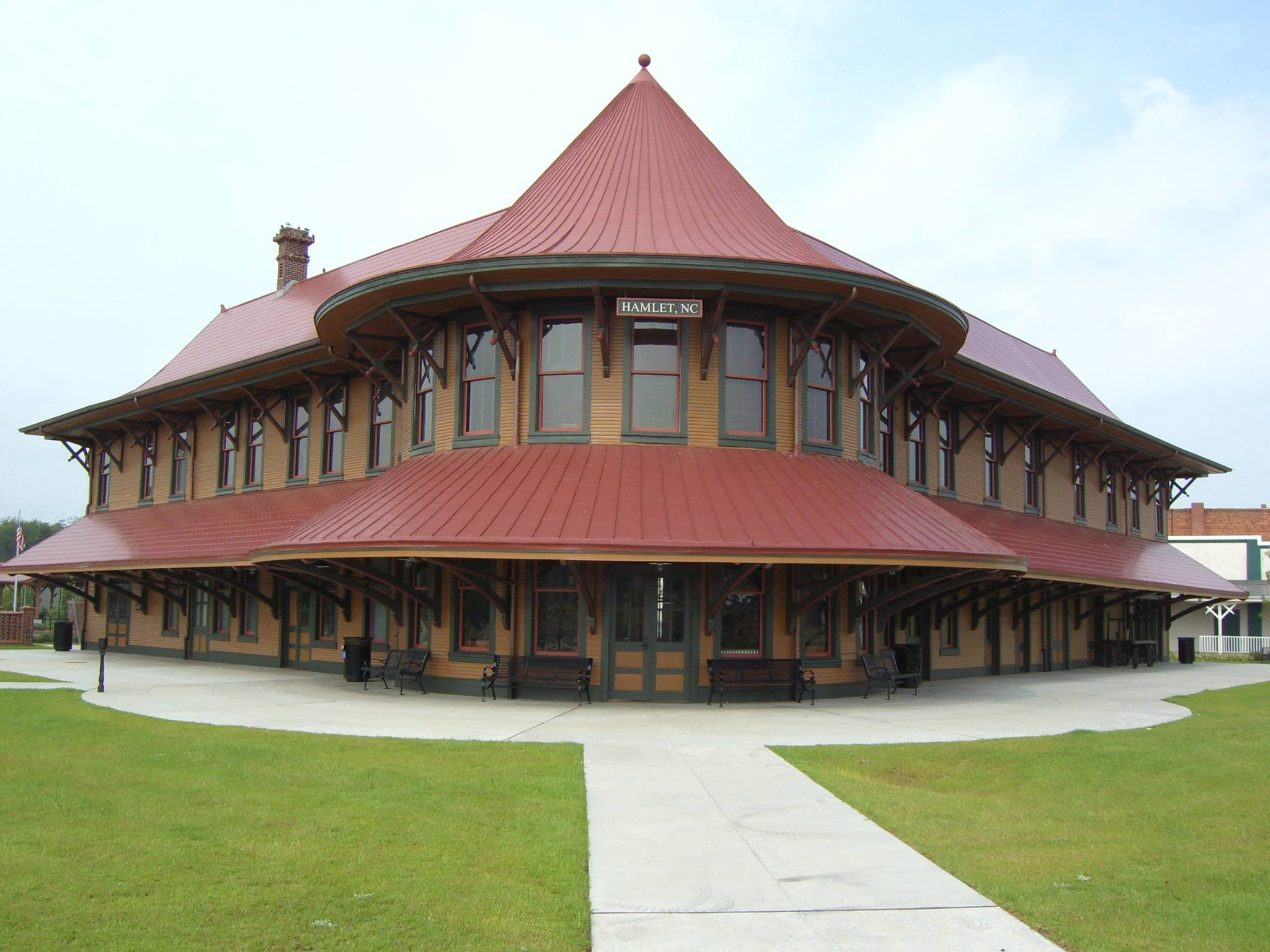
- Hamlet station in 2020

General information
- Location: 2 West Main Street; Hamlet, North Carolina; United States
- Coordinates: 34°53′01.7″N 79°41′56.6″W
- Owner: City of Hamlet
- Line: Hamlet Terminal Subdivision
- Platforms: 1 side platform
- Tracks: 1

Construction
- Parking: Yes
- Accessible: Yes
- Architectural style: Victorian Queen Anne

Other information
- Status: Unstaffed
- Station code: Amtrak: HAM
- Website: hamlethistoricdepot.org

History
- Opened: 1900
- Rebuilt: 2002–2004
- Original company: Seaboard Air Line Railroad

Passengers
- FY 2025: 4,083 (Amtrak)

Services
| Preceding station | Amtrak | Following station |
|---|---|---|
| Camden toward Miami | Floridian | Southern Pines toward Chicago |
Former services
| Preceding station | Amtrak | Following station |
|---|---|---|
| Camden toward Miami | Silver Star until 2024 | Southern Pines toward New York |
| Preceding station | Seaboard Air Line Railroad | Following station |
| Kollocks toward Tampa or Miami | Main Line | Marston toward Richmond |
| Gibson toward Savannah | East Carolina Line | Terminus |
| Rockingham toward Rutherfordton | Carolina Central Railroad | Laurinburg toward Wilmington |

U.S. National Register of Historic Places
- Official name: Seaboard Air Line Passenger Depot
- Designated: November 19, 1971
- Reference no.: 71000617
Location

Hamlet station is an Amtrak train station in Hamlet, North Carolina, United States, served by the daily Floridian. The station, built in 1900 is listed on the National Register of Historic Places individually and as part of the Main Street Commercial Historic District.

== History ==
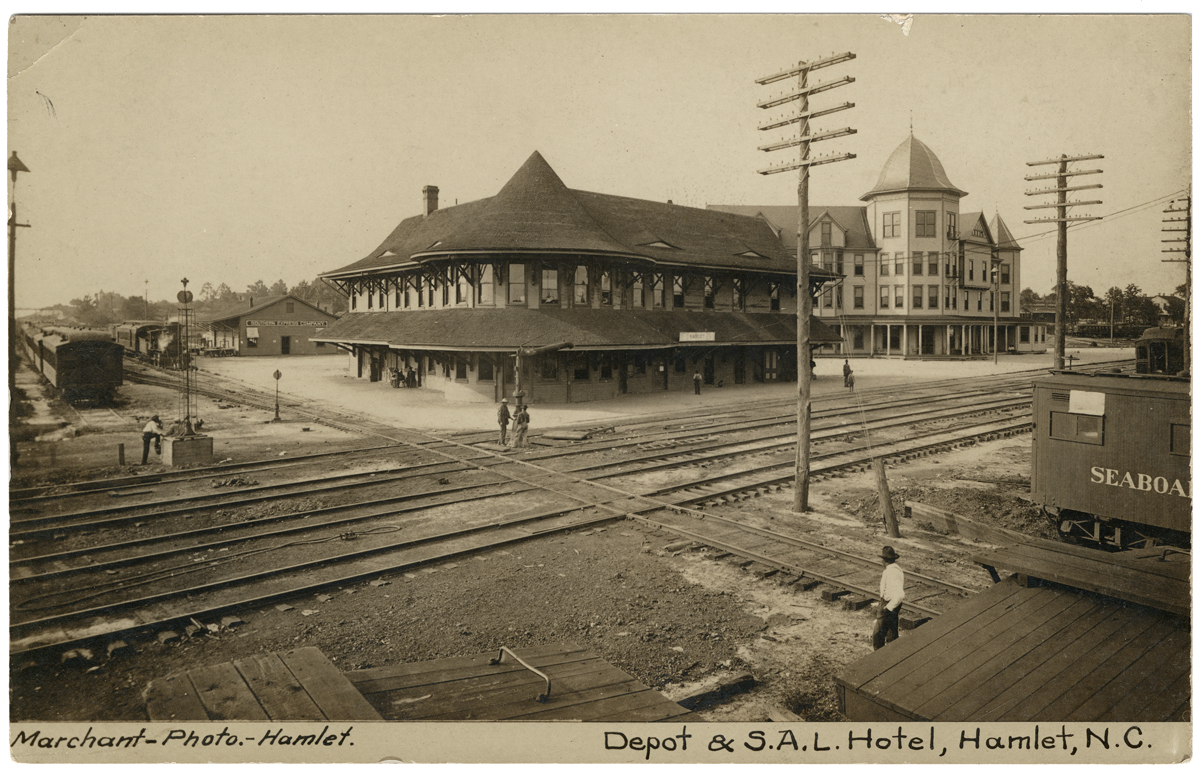
1912 postcard of Hamlet station

Hamlet Station was originally built in 1900 by the Seaboard Air Line Railroad as both a passenger station and a division headquarters. In addition to serving the Seaboard's mainline trains between Richmond and Florida (including the Silver Meteor and Silver Star), the station served until 1969 the Silver Comet to Birmingham. Until 1958, the SAL operated a daily passenger train from Wilmington, North Carolina, to Charlotte via Hamlet and Monroe.

The station was listed on the National Register of Historic Places on November 19, 1971 as the Seaboard Air Line Passenger Depot. That year, Amtrak took over intercity passenger service. Between 2001 and 2004 the entire Queen Anne-style station house was moved across a set of tracks for safety, and converted into a museum by the North Carolina Department of Transportation. On November 10, 2024, the Silver Star was merged with the Capitol Limited as the Floridian.

In 2026, Amtrak completed a $3.2 million accessibility project at the station that included two 200-foot (60 m)-long accessible platforms.
