= Depot Museum =

Railroad museum in Avon Park, Florida, U.S.

Coordinates: 27°35′48″N 81°30′20″W

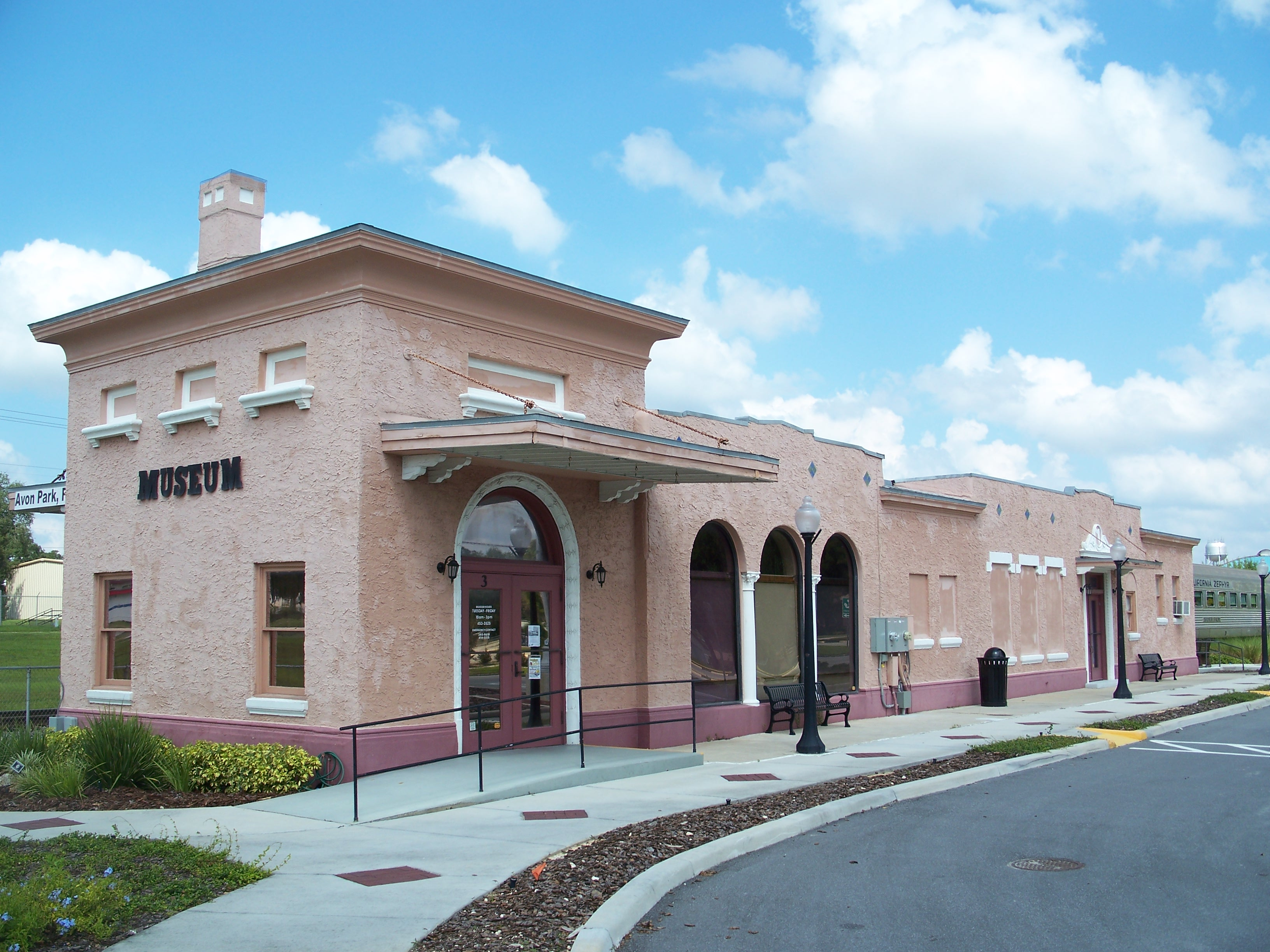

The Depot Museum in Avon Park, Florida in Highlands County, Florida is a railroad museum housed in a historic 1926 railroad depot. It is operated by the Historical Society of Avon Park. A dining car is exhibited. The depot was along the Seaboard Airline Railroad Miami Subdivision, serving the Palmland, Silver Meteor, Silver Star and Sunland trains. Since 1989, the line has been designated as the CSX Auburndale Subdivision. The line is also in close proximity to the Atlantic Coast Line Railroad Haines City Branch, which was built through Avon Park in 1912.

Preceding station	Seaboard Air Line Railroad	Following station
Sebring toward Miami	Main Line	West Frostproof toward Richmond

Preceding station	Atlantic Coast Line Railroad	Following station
Pittsburgh toward Haines City	Haines City – Everglades City	Tulane toward Everglades City
