= Sebring station =

Train station in Sebring, Florida, US

Sebring, FL
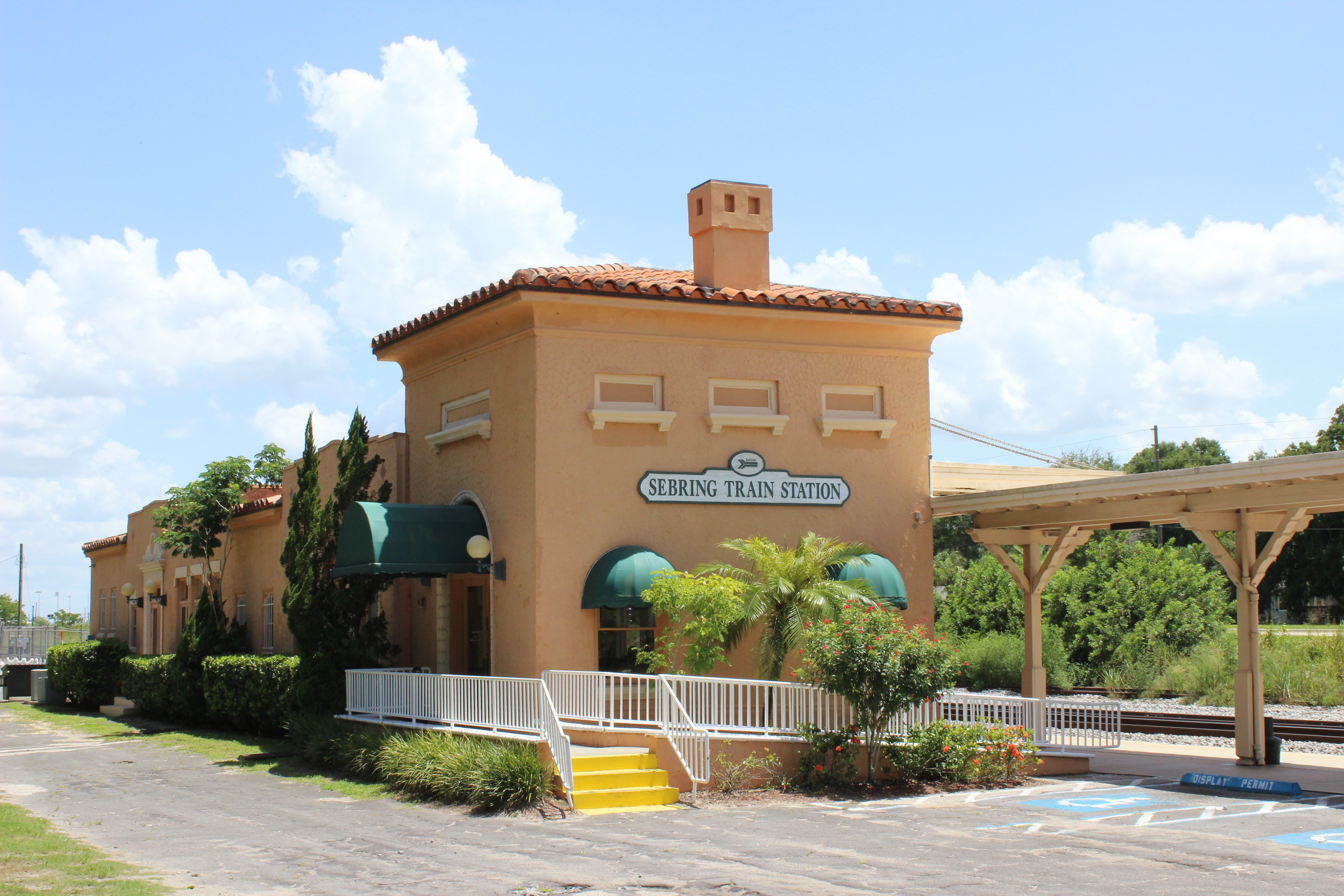
- Sebring station in July 2015

General information
- Location: 601 East Center Street; Sebring, Florida; United States
- Coordinates: 27°29′46″N 81°26′5″W
- Line: Auburndale Subdivision
- Platforms: 1 side platform
- Tracks: 2

Construction
- Parking: Yes

Other information
- Station code: Amtrak: SBG

History
- Opened: 1924

Passengers
- FY 2025: 17,805 (Amtrak)

Services
Preceding station	Amtrak	Following station
Okeechobee toward Miami	Floridian	Winter Haven toward Chicago
West Palm Beach toward Miami	Silver Meteor	Winter Haven toward New York
Former services
Preceding station	Amtrak	Following station
Winter Haven toward Los Angeles	Sunset Limited 1993–1996	Okeechobee toward Miami
Okeechobee toward Miami	Palmetto 2002–2004	Winter Haven toward New York
Okeechobee toward Miami	Silver Star until 2024	Winter Haven toward New York
West Palm Beach toward Miami	Floridian 1971–1979	Winter Haven toward Chicago
Preceding station	Seaboard Air Line Railroad	Following station
Okeechobee toward Miami	Main Line	Avon Park toward Richmond
- Old Sebring Seaboard Air Line Depot
- U.S. National Register of Historic Places
- Interactive map of Old Sebring Seaboard Air Line Depot
- Area: 4.5 acres (1.8 ha)
- Architectural style: Masonry Vernacular
- MPS: Sebring MPS
- NRHP reference No.: 90000425
- Added to NRHP: March 16, 1990
Location

Sebring station is an Amtrak train station in Sebring, Florida, United States. It is served by the Floridian and Silver Meteor.

== History ==
Located on East Center Avenue, the station was constructed in 1924 by the Seaboard Air Line Railway. Approaching the transfer of passenger services to Amtrak, the station was used by the Seaboard Coast Line Railroad for the Silver Meteor, Silver Star and the Palmland. The latter train ended in 1971, while the Silver Meteor and Silver Star remained operated by Amtrak.. Amtrak trains formerly using the station included the Floridian (1971–1979), Palmetto (2002–2004), Sunset Limited (1993–1996) and Silver Palm (1982–1985).

On March 16, 1990, it was added to the U.S. National Register of Historic Places as Old Sebring Seaboard Air Line Depot. On November 10, 2024, the Silver Star was merged with the Capitol Limited as the Floridian.
