= Wth =

Wth or WTH may refer to:

- a rare abbreviation for Watt-hour
- the ISO 639-3 code of the Wathawurrung language
- an internet slang abbreviation for "what the hell”
- the Amtrak station code for Winter Haven station, Florida, United States
- the National Rail station code for Whitehaven railway station, Cumbria, England
- an abbreviation for whole-tree harvest, a forestry practice similar to whole-tree logging
- What the Health, a 2017 documentary film
