= Southern Pines station =

Railway station in Southern Pines, North Carolina

Southern Pines, NC
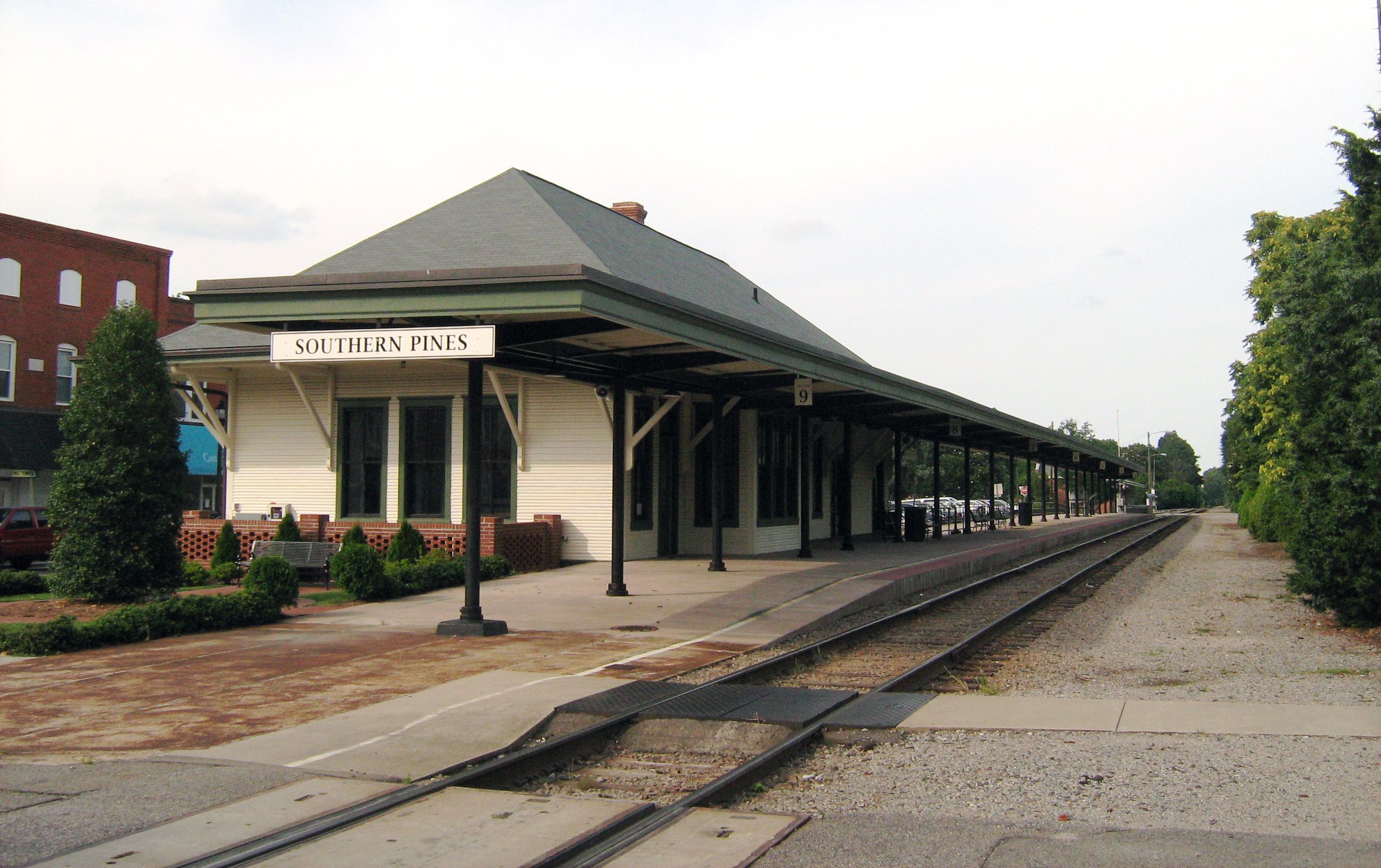
- Southern Pines station in June 2009

General information
- Location: 235 Northwest Broad Street; Southern Pines, North Carolina; United States
- Coordinates: 35.175527°N 79.390383°W
- Owner: Town of Southern Pines
- Line: Aberdeen Subdivision
- Platforms: 1 side platform
- Tracks: 1

Construction
- Parking: Yes; free
- Accessible: Yes

Other information
- Status: Unstaffed
- Station code: Amtrak: SOP

History
- Opened: 1898
- Rebuilt: 1948, 2004

Passengers
- FY 2025: 7,059 (Amtrak)

Services
Preceding station	Amtrak	Following station
Hamlet toward Miami	Floridian	Cary toward Chicago
Former services
Preceding station	Amtrak	Following station
Hamlet toward Miami	Silver Star until 2024	Cary toward New York
Preceding station	Seaboard Air Line Railroad	Following station
Aberdeen toward Tampa or Miami	Main Line	Sanford toward Richmond
Location

Southern Pines station is an Amtrak train station located in Southern Pines, North Carolina, served by the daily Floridian. The station was originally built by a predecessor of the Seaboard Air Line Railroad in 1898, renovated in 1948, and restored to its 1948 design in 2004. On November 10, 2024, the Silver Star was merged with the Capitol Limited as the Floridian.
