= Camden station (South Carolina) =

Amtrak station in Camden, South Carolina, United States

Camden, SC
- Camden station in August 2026

General information
- Location: 1060 West Dekalb Street; Camden, South Carolina; United States
- Coordinates: 34.248°N 80.625°W
- Line: Hamlet Subdivision
- Platforms: 1 side platform
- Tracks: 1

Construction
- Parking: Yes

Other information
- Station code: Amtrak: CAM

History
- Opened: 1937

Passengers
- FY 2025: 3,217 (Amtrak)

Services
Preceding station	Amtrak	Following station
Columbia toward Miami	Floridian	Hamlet toward Chicago
Former services
Preceding station	Amtrak	Following station
Columbia toward Miami	Silver Star until 2024	Hamlet toward New York
Preceding station	Seaboard Air Line Railroad	Following station
Columbia toward Tampa or Miami	Main Line	Cassatt toward Richmond
- Seaboard Air Line Railway Depot
- U.S. National Register of Historic Places
- Area: 1.3 acres (0.5 ha)
- Built: 1937
- Architect: Wadesboro Construction Company
- Architectural style: Colonial Revival
- NRHP reference No.: 00000590
- Added to NRHP: June 2, 2000
Location

Camden station is an Amtrak train station in Camden, South Carolina, served by the daily Floridian.

The station was built by the Seaboard Air Line Railroad in 1937. It was named to the National Register of Historic Places in 2000 as Seaboard Air Line Railroad Depot. A $2.5 million restoration and accessibility renovation took place in 2015. On November 10, 2024, the Silver Star was merged with the Capitol Limited as the Floridian.

Amtrak completed renovations to this station as well as to Denmark station in early 2026.
