= Silver Palm (train) =

Named Amtak trains in USA

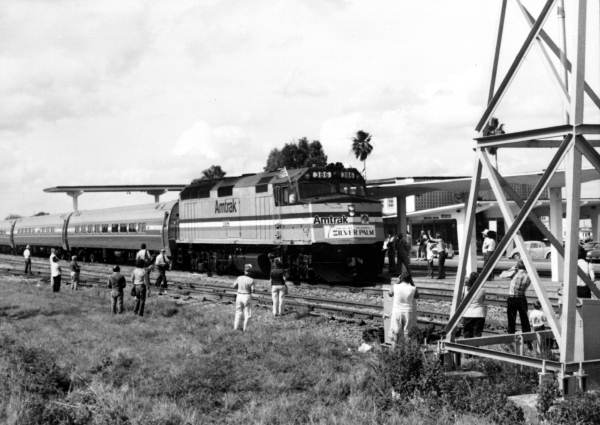
- The Silver Palm on its inaugural run in 1982. An EMD F40PHR leads an Amfleet consist.

Overview
- Service type: Inter-city rail
- Status: Discontinued
- Locale: Florida
- First service: November 21, 1982
- Last service: April 30, 1985
- Former operator: Amtrak

Route
- Termini: Miami, Florida; Tampa, Florida
- Stops: 8
- Distance travelled: 255 miles (410 km)
- Average journey time: 5 hours
- Service frequency: Daily
- Train number: 895, 896

On-board services
- Class: Unreserved coach
- Catering facilities: On-board cafe

Technical
- Rolling stock: Amfleet coaches
- Track gauge: 4 ft 8 1/2 in (1,435 mm)
- Track owner: Seaboard System

The Silver Palm was a daily passenger train route operated by Amtrak between Miami and Tampa in the U.S. state of Florida. Service began in 1982 and ended in 1985.

From 1996 to 2002, Amtrak reused the Silver Palm name to rebrand its New York–Miami Palmetto route under the Silver Service banner.

== History ==
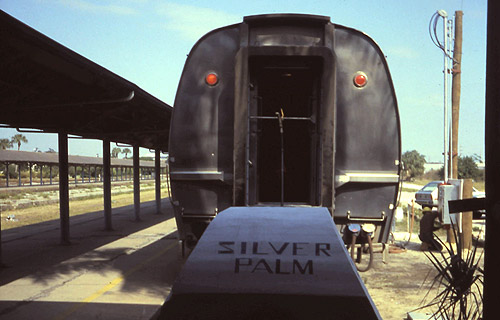
The Silver Palm at Tampa in March 1983

As early as 1974, Florida considered funding a Miami–Orlando service using Turboliners, with expansion statewide possible. Amtrak ultimately introduced the first Silver Palm as a single round trip service between Miami and Tampa, Florida, on November 21, 1982. The train was subsidized by the Florida Department of Transportation as a 403(b) service. The train operated over the tracks of the Seaboard System Railroad between Miami and Tampa via Auburndale. The northbound train departed Miami in the morning and returned from Tampa in the afternoon. Travel time was approximately five hours in each direction. A bus connection was provided between Winter Haven and Orlando. It followed the traditional SAL mainline through Wildwood and Ocala in north-central Florida.

The Silver Palm was the first intrastate train to use the then-new Amfleet II coaches. The initial consist was two coaches and a cafe car.

During its service, train crew were required to manually throw switches for the train to operate between divisions. Amtrak had worked to remove speed restrictions on the line and considered adding more stops in an effort to improve service and increase the train's profitability. The state also tried to help boost ridership following a publicity tour by then Lieutenant Governor Wayne Mixson in August 1984, in part to build a base of riders for proposed high-speed service in the state. After a two-year trial the Florida Department of Transportation recommended ending subsidies for the Silver Palm. State law required that state-sponsored services maintain a farebox ratio of 60% to continue funding.

FDOT announced on October 20, 1984, that the Silver Palm's ratio was 45.3%. The service was scheduled to be discontinued on November 20, 1984. The Florida Coalition of Rail Passengers sued the state, arguing that the Department of Transportation had calculated the operating ratio incorrectly, and won at the district court level. This decision was overturned on appeal by the Florida First District Court of Appeal on March 28, 1985. The Silver Palm was discontinued on April 30, 1985. It was estimated to have cost $4 million over the course of its run.

=== Revived name ===
The second Silver Palm was a long-distance passenger train between New York, New York, and Miami, Florida. This was a revival of the Palmetto, which Amtrak had discontinued on April 1, 1995. Service began on November 10, 1996. For a period in the mid-1990s, as in the 1996-1997 season, it was Amtrak's only train passing through Ocala area north-central Florida section in 1996. Amtrak restored the Palmetto name on May 1, 2002, after the train lost sleeping and dining car service.

=== Proposed restoration ===
Currently, only the Silver Star (which has been temporarily replaced by the Floridian) provides daily Amtrak service between Miami and Tampa. A proposal called Amtrak Connects US outlines 15-year expansion plans for state-supported intercity rail corridors, with one of the routes being between Miami and Tampa. It would follow the same route as the Silver Palm, with stops at all the same stations as well as an additional stop at the Okeechobee station.

== See also ==
- Palmetto
- Silver Service
