= Okeechobee station (Amtrak) =

Railway station in Florida, USA

Okeechobee, FL
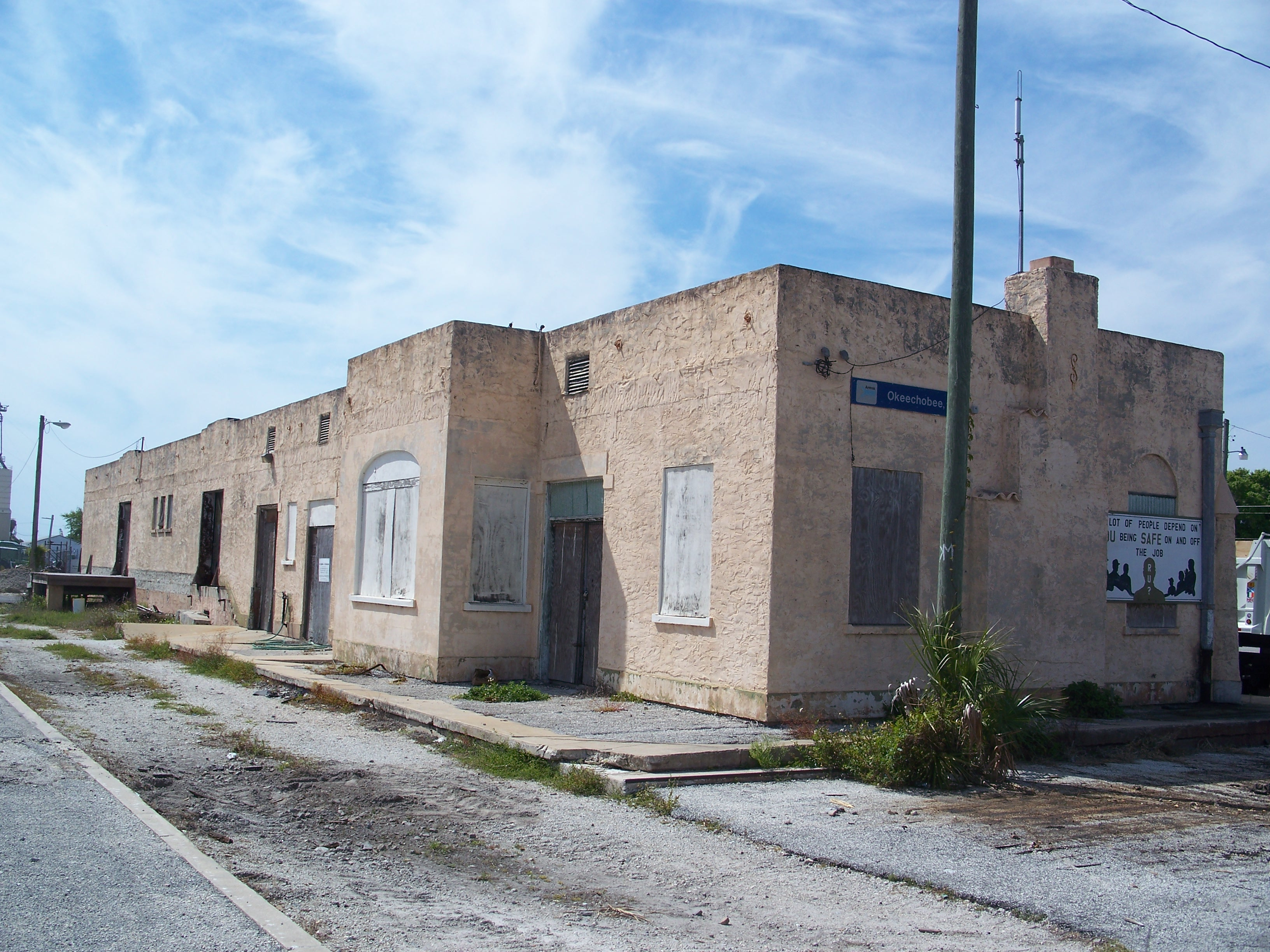
- The previous station building, built in 1924

General information
- Location: 801 North Parrott Avenue (US 441); Okeechobee, Florida; United States
- Coordinates: 27.25178°N 80.82991°W
- Line: Auburndale Subdivision
- Platforms: 1 side platform
- Tracks: 2

Other information
- Station code: Amtrak: OKE

History
- Opened: 1924
- Rebuilt: October 25, 1986, 2011

Passengers
- FY 2025: 4,672 (Amtrak)

Services
Preceding station	Amtrak	Following station
West Palm Beach toward Miami	Floridian	Sebring toward Chicago
Silver Meteor does not stop here
Former services
Preceding station	Amtrak	Following station
Sebring toward Los Angeles	Sunset Limited 1993–1996	West Palm Beach toward Miami
West Palm Beach toward Miami	Palmetto 2002–2004	Sebring toward New York
West Palm Beach toward Miami	Silver Star	Sebring toward New York
Preceding station	Seaboard Air Line Railroad	Following station
Indiantown toward Miami	Main Line	Sebring toward Richmond
Location

Okeechobee station is a train station in Okeechobee, Florida, served by Amtrak.

== History ==
The previous depot at the site was built in 1924 for the Seaboard Air Line Railway, and was demolished in 2014. Amtrak currently uses an adjacent shelter constructed in 2011. Built of red brick-accented with cream-colored, rock-faced stonework, the shelter has a waiting room with large windows. The $1.5 million project was funded through Amtrak's "Mobility First" initiative under the American Recovery and Reinvestment Act of 2009.

On November 10, 2024, the Silver Star was merged with the Capitol Limited as the Floridian.
