= Florida Midland Railroad =

Short line railroad in Central Florida

Florida Midland Railroad Company, Inc.
Overview
- Headquarters: Plymouth, Florida
- Reporting mark: FMID
- Locale: three spurs in Central Florida

Technical
- Track gauge: 4 ft 8 1/2 in (1,435 mm) standard gauge

Other
- Website: Official website

The Florida Midland Railroad Company, Inc. (reporting mark FMID) is one of several short line railroads operated by Regional Rail, LLC in Florida (along with the Florida Central Railroad and the Florida Northern Railroad). The Florida Midland Railroad operates two former CSX Transportation railroad lines including their former Lake Wales Subdivision (running from West Lake Wales to Frostproof), and their former Bartow Subdivision (from Winter Haven to a point just northwest of Bartow). It once had a third line from Wildwood to Leesburg that is now mostly abandoned. Florida Midland Railroad began operating the lines in 1987 and uses locomotives branded for the Florida Central Railroad, its sister railroad.

In November 2019, former owner Pinsly Railroad Company sold the Florida Midland, along with the Florida Central Railroad and Florida Northern Railroad, to 3i RR Holdings GP, LLC and subsidiaries (d.b.a. "Regional Rail, LLC").

== Lake Wales Line ==
The line from West Lake Wales to Frostproof, which extends a distance of about 18 miles, branches off of CSX's Auburndale Subdivision in West Lake Wales. It proceeds east to Lake Wales along a former Seaboard Air Line Railroad (SAL) line. In Lake Wales, the line turns north and connects with the north-south segment of the line, which is a former Atlantic Coast Line Railroad (ACL) line known as the Haines City Branch. From here, the line continues south for the remaining 14 miles to Frostproof. Since the junction between the two segments in Lake Wales is oriented north, a run-around track just before the junction is used to move locomotives to the opposite end of the trains. Trains are then backed onto the north-south segment so they can proceed south with the locomotive on the front.

The line notably serves citrus fields and a Lowe's distribution center at the terminus in Frostproof.

The interchange between CSX and the Florida Midland takes place on a small yard track in West Lake Wales. The Florida Midland Railroad also has trackage rights on a small section of CSX's Auburndale Subdivision to facilitate the interchange.

=== History ===
The east-west segment of the line was built by the Seaboard Air Line Railroad in 1916, which was part of a line that originally extended from Bartow and continued west to Alcoma, Hesperides, and Walinwa. The north-south segment of the line from Lake Wales south to Frostproof was built earlier in 1912 by the Atlantic Coast Line Railroad. It is a discontinuous segment of track that was once the Atlantic Coast Line's Haines City Branch, which historically extended as far south as Everglades City.

The Atlantic Coast Line and Seaboard Air Line merged in 1967 into the Seaboard Coast Line Railroad, which led to consolidation of the two networks and the abandonment of redundant trackage in the 1970s, reducing the line to its current length. Seaboard Coast Line became CSX in 1980, six years before Florida Midland Railroad began operating over the line.

== Winter Haven Line ==
The Florida Midland Railroad also operates a separate 6-mile line in Winter Haven. It branches off CSX's Auburndale Subdivision just south of Winter Haven Amtrak station (about 10 miles north of where the Lake Wales Line branches off the same line). From Winter Haven, it runs southwest to Gordonville (just northeast of Bartow) where it ends. The line notably serves a 24-acre transload facility in Eagle Lake, as well as Bartow Executive Airport.

The Florida Midland Railroad has trackage rights on the Auburndale Subdivision to Winter Haven siding to facilitate the interchange between the two companies.

=== History ===
The Winter Haven line was originally built in 1884 as the Bartow Branch of the South Florida Railroad (later part of the Plant System and the Atlantic Coast Line Railroad). It historically extended from the South Florida Railroad main line (the current CSX A Line) in Lake Alfred and extended into Bartow. It was abandoned north of Winter Haven to Lake Alfred in the early 1970s and was connected to the current Auburndale Subdivision (a former Seaboard track). The line was severed from Bartow in the 1980s and it now terminates near Gordonville.

== Former Leesburg Line ==
The Florida Midland Railroad once operated a third line from Wildwood to Leesburg. Most of the Leesburg line was once the westernmost segment of the Orlando Division of the Florida Central and Peninsular Railroad (later part of the Seaboard Air Line Railroad). The easternmost two miles however were originally part of the Florida Southern Railway (later part of the Atlantic Coast Line Railroad). In 2000, the company petitioned the Surface Transportation Board to abandon the entire Leesburg Branch, which was granted on November 15, 2000. All that remains of the line is a short turning wye in Wildwood.
