= Auburndale TECO Trail =

Trail in Auburndale, Florida, USA

Coordinates: 28°5′4″N 81°49′17″W

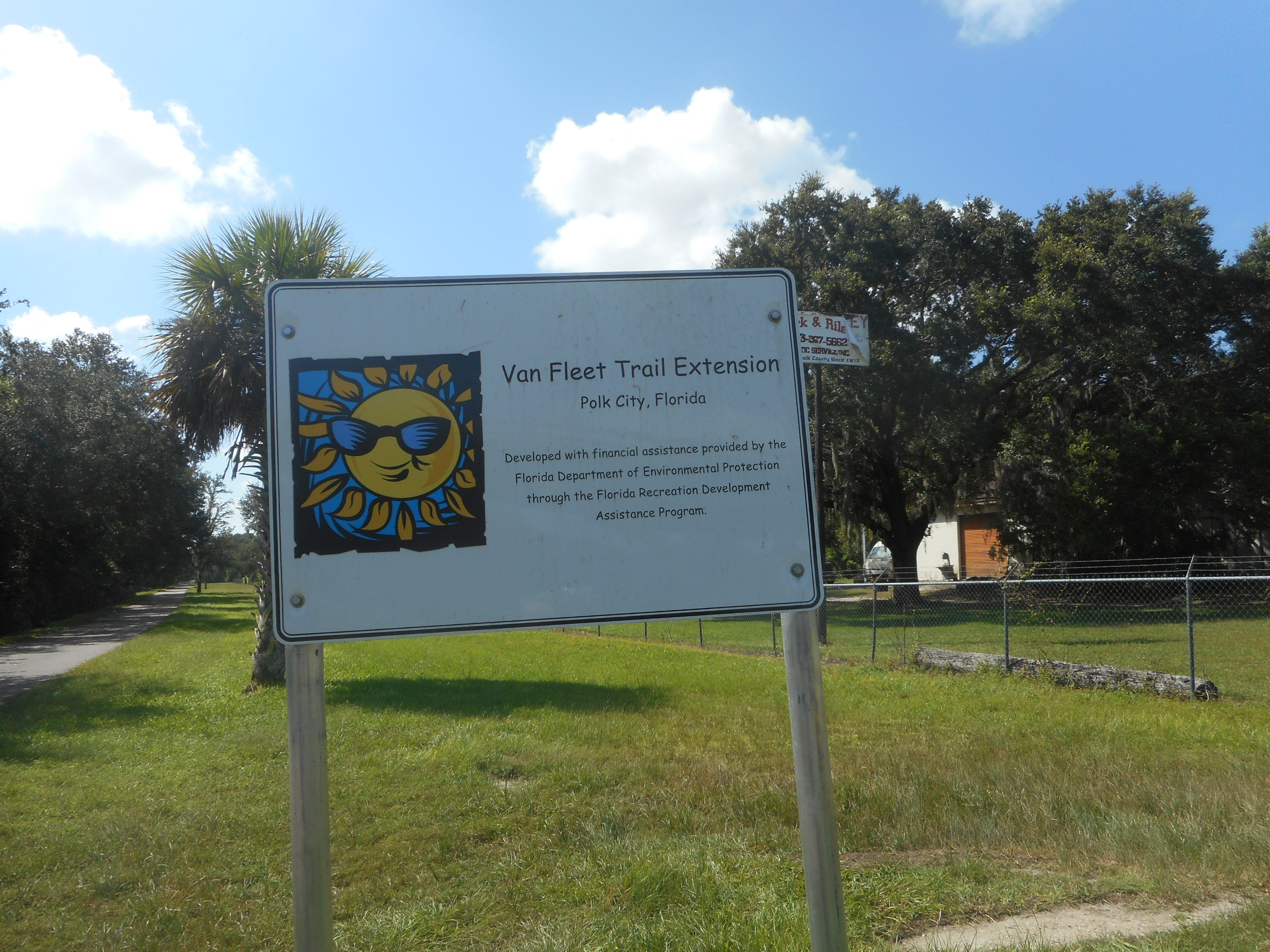
- The northern terminus of the Auburndale TECO Trail, at the south end of the General James A. Van Fleet Trailhead in Polk City.
- Length: 7.3 mi (11.7 km)
- Location: Auburndale to Polk City, Florida, United States
- Trailheads: Lake Myrtle, Florida; Van Fleet Trail Polk City, Florida trailhead
- Elevation change: 5 feet
- Season: Year round
- Surface: Asphalt

The Auburndale TECO Trail is a 7.3-mile (11.7 km) multi-use path in Auburndale, Florida, United States. The southern terminus of the trail is at the northeast corner of Plymouth Road and Berkley Road (Polk CR 655) southeast of the Lake Myrtle Sports Complex. The southern trailhead is on Denton Avenue west of Berkeley Road. At the northern terminus, the trail joins the General James A. Van Fleet State Trail in Polk City. Plentiful parking is available at both trailheads. The route is almost completely flat, with an ascent of less than 5 feet (1.5 m). The trail is approximately 12 feet (3.7 m) wide and, like the Van Fleet Trail, it was constructed on an abandoned Seaboard Air Line Railroad corridor. The path is maintained by Polk County in cooperation with TECO Energy, and is sometimes referred to as the Van Fleet Trail extension. In the future, the route will be linked to the Hilochee Wildlife Management Area.
