= Winter Haven station =

Railway station in Winter Haven, Florida, US

Winter Haven, FL
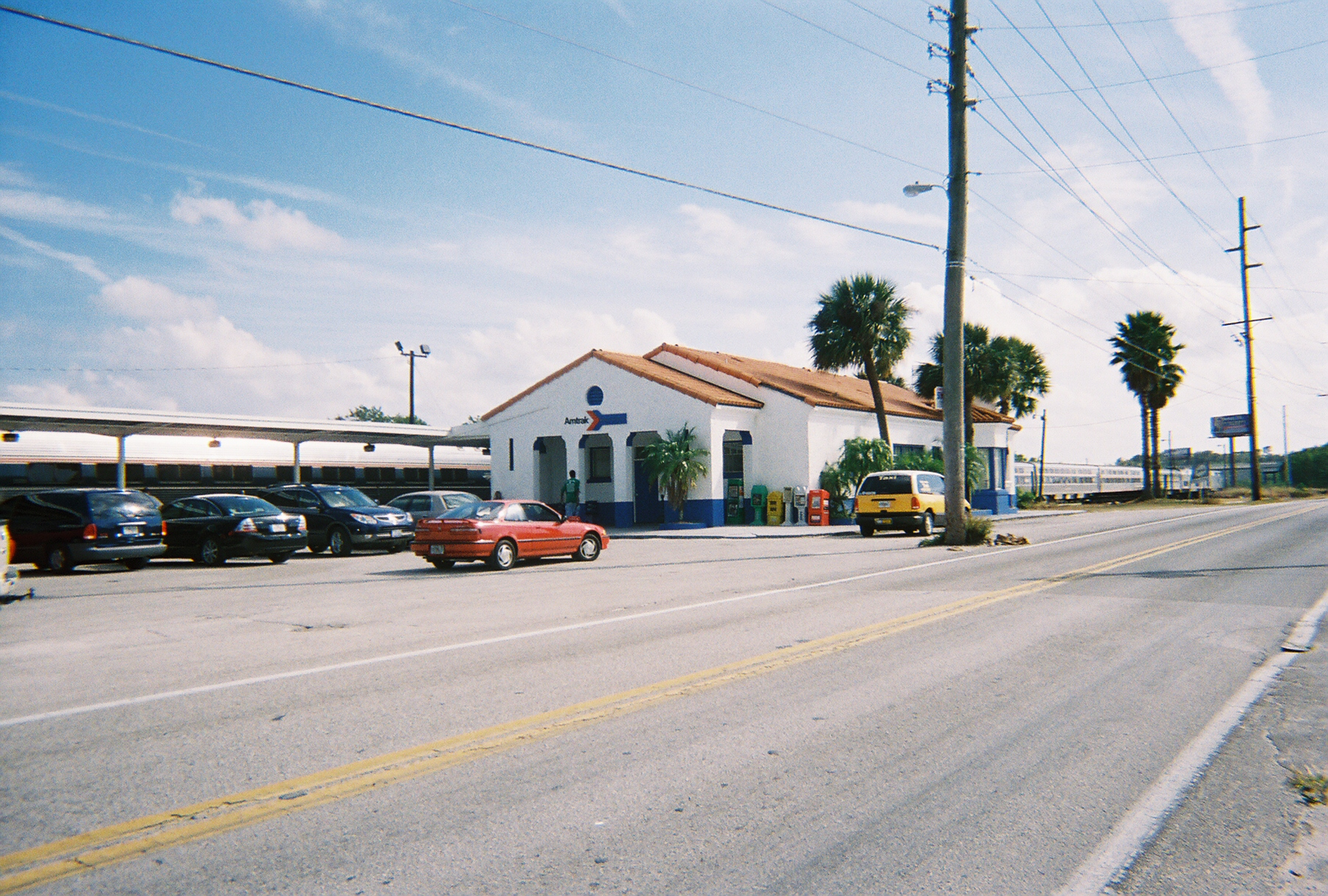
- Winter Haven station in February 2009

General information
- Location: 1800 7th Street SW; Winter Haven, Florida; United States
- Coordinates: 28.00394°N 81.73494°W
- Line: Auburndale Subdivision
- Platforms: 1 side platform
- Tracks: 1
- Connections: Citrus Connection 40, 44

Other information
- Station code: Amtrak: WTH

History
- Opened: 1925
- Rebuilt: 1947

Passengers
- FY 2025: 30,309 (Amtrak)

Services
Preceding station	Amtrak	Following station
Sebring toward Miami	Floridian	Lakeland toward Chicago
Sebring toward Miami	Silver Meteor	Kissimmee toward New York
Former services
Preceding station	Amtrak	Following station
Kissimmee toward Los Angeles	Sunset Limited 1993–1996	Sebring toward Miami
Sebring toward Miami	Floridian	Wildwood toward Chicago
Sebring toward Miami	Palmetto 2002–2004	Lakeland toward New York
Sebring toward Miami	Silver Star	Lakeland toward New York
Preceding station	Seaboard Air Line Railroad	Following station
West Lake Wales toward Miami	Main Line	Polk City toward Richmond
Location

Winter Haven station is an Amtrak train station in Winter Haven, Florida. It is served by the Floridian and Silver Meteor.

== History ==
The station was originally built in 1925 by the Seaboard Air Line Railway and was rebuilt in 1947. It included a freight depot which was located on the south side of the station until 1982, and was torn down after Seaboard Coast Line Railroad merged with Louisville and Nashville Railroad the next year. Today, after a series of mergers, the station track is owned by CSX Transportation. Tracks that cross the platform on the south side of the station serve as an interchange point between CSX Transportation and the Florida Midland Railroad Gordonville Subdivision. On November 10, 2024, the Silver Star was merged with the Capitol Limited as the Floridian.
