= Auburndale Subdivision =

CSX railroad line in Florida

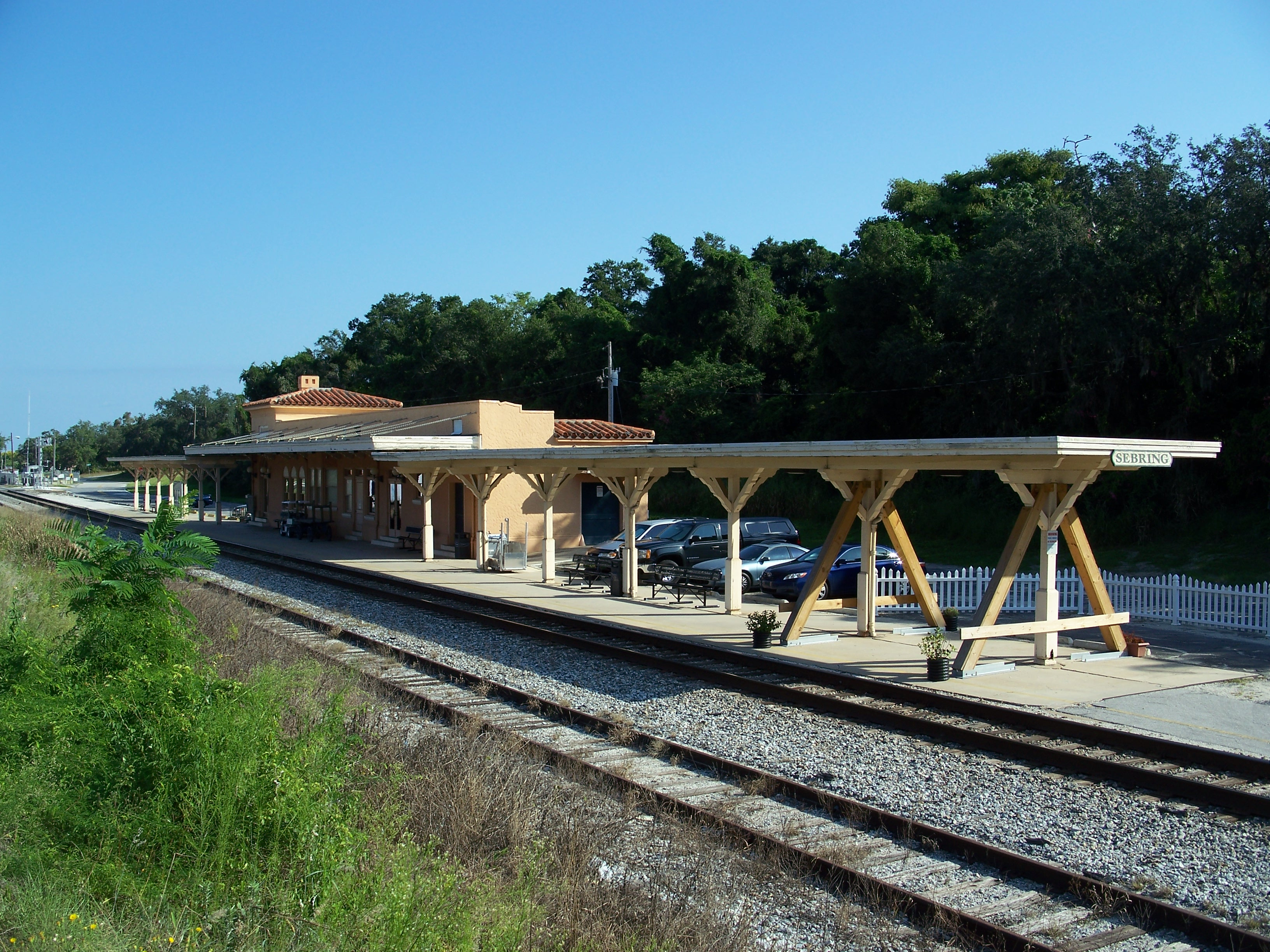
Sebring Amtrak station along the Auburndale Subdivision

The Auburndale Subdivision is a rail line in southern Central Florida owned and operated by CSX Transportation, running along their SX Line from Auburndale through southern Central Florida to a point just northwest of West Palm Beach. The line connects with CSX’s A Line (Carters Subdivision) in Auburndale. At its south end, it continues as the state-owned South Florida Rail Corridor.

== Route description ==
The Auburndale Subdivision begins in Auburndale, its namesake city. Here, it connects with CSX's A Line (Carters Subdivision). A short spur known as McDonald Connection connects the Auburndale Subdivision with the CSX A Line towards Tampa.

From Auburndale, it proceeds south through southern Central Florida, passing through Winter Haven, West Lake Wales, Avon Park, and Sebring. In Sebring, it turns east and southeast to Okeechobee. From here, it continued southeast near the northern edge of Lake Okeechobee in a nearly straight line. The Auburndale Subdivision ends just outside of West Palm Beach near Mangonia Park. From here, the line continues south as the South Florida Rail Corridor, which is owned by the Florida Department of Transportation.

== Operation ==
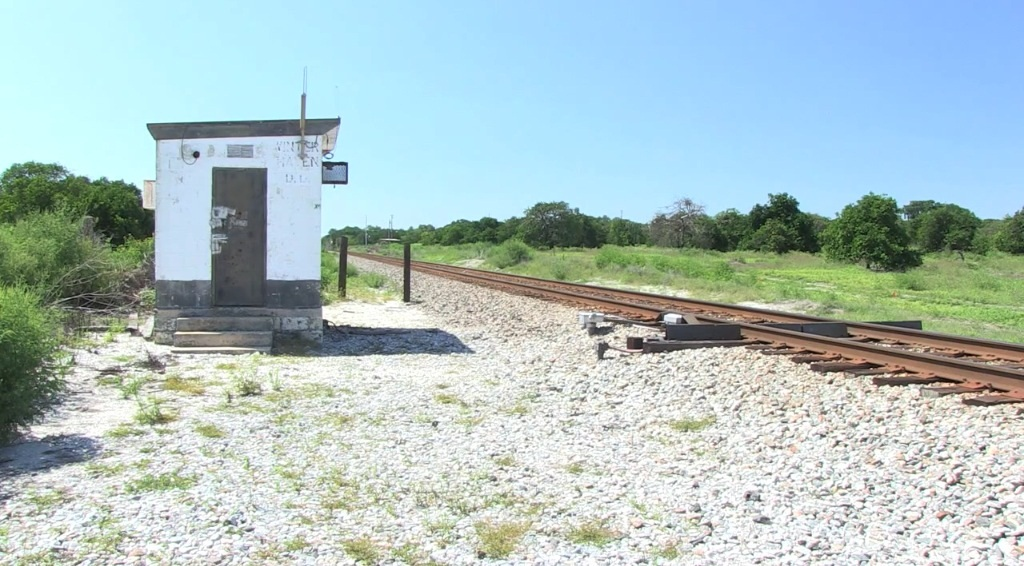
Defect detector along the Auburndale Subdivision in Winter Haven

The Auburndale Subdivision is CSX’s only line to South Florida and the Miami area. The line notably carries Amtrak’s Silver Meteor and Floridian trains to and from Miami, which each run round-trip daily.

All CSX freight trains to and from Miami also run the line. Freight trains also notably serve the Palm Center Automotive Terminal just west of Jupiter and CSX's Winter Haven Intermodal Logistics Center in Winter Haven which opened in 2014. A short spur known as Mission Spur splits from the line in Mangonia Park just north of the South Florida Rail Corridor boundary. Mission Spur connects with the Florida East Coast Railway’s Lewis Terminal track, which connects to FEC’s main line.

CSX also uses the line to interchange freight with the Florida Midland Railroad in Winter Haven and West Lake Wales and with the South Central Florida Express (which is owned by U.S. Sugar) in Sebring.

== History ==
The Auburndale Subdivision was built in 1925 by the Seaboard Air Line Railroad. It was part of the Seaboard's Miami Subdivision, which in its entirety ran from the Seaboard's Main Line in Coleman to Miami. Track north of Auburndale to Coleman was abandoned in 1989.

== See also ==
- List of CSX Transportation lines
- Auburndale TECO Trail
- General James A. Van Fleet State Trail
