= Hollywood station (Florida) =

Train station in Florida, United States

Hollywood

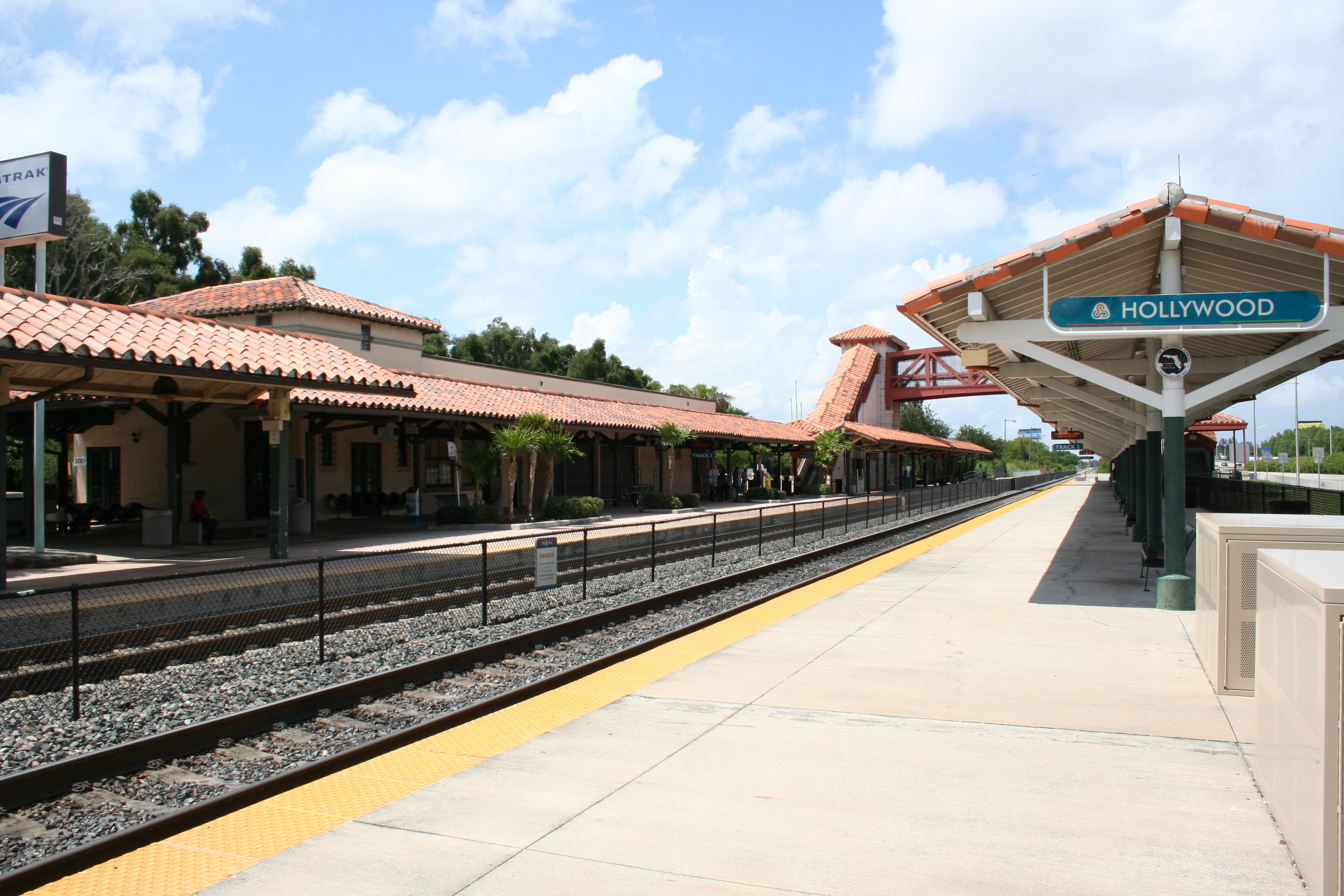
- Hollywood station in 2011

General information
- Location: 3001 Hollywood Boulevard; Hollywood, Florida; United States
- Coordinates: 26°0′43″N 80°10′4″W
- Owner: Florida Department of Transportation
- Line: South Florida Rail Corridor
- Platforms: 2 side platforms
- Tracks: 2
- Connections: Broward County Transit: 7

Construction
- Parking: Yes
- Cycle facilities: Yes
- Accessible: Yes

Other information
- Station code: Amtrak: HOL
- Fare zone: Fort Lauderdale Airport–Hollywood (Tri-Rail)

History
- Opened: 1928
- Rebuilt: 2002

Passengers
- FY 2025: 24,707 (Amtrak)

Services
Preceding station	Amtrak	Following station
Miami Terminus	Floridian	Fort Lauderdale toward Chicago
Miami Terminus	Silver Meteor	Fort Lauderdale toward New York
Preceding station	Tri-Rail	Following station
Golden Glades toward Miami Airport	Main Line	Sheridan Street toward Mangonia Park
Express does not stop here
Former services
Preceding station	Amtrak	Following station
Fort Lauderdale toward Los Angeles	Sunset Limited 1993–1996	Miami Terminus
Miami Terminus	Palmetto 2002–2004	Fort Lauderdale toward New York
Miami Terminus	Silver Star	Fort Lauderdale toward New York
Miami Terminus	Floridian	Fort Lauderdale toward Chicago
Preceding station	Seaboard Air Line Railroad	Following station
Opa-locka toward Miami	Main Line	Fort Lauderdale toward Richmond
Location

Hollywood station is a train station in Hollywood, Florida, which is served by Tri-Rail and Amtrak. The station is located at 3001 Hollywood Boulevard, just west of Interstate 95 and east of State Road 9. It has two side platforms serving the line's two tracks.

== History ==
=== Seaboard Air Line Railway ===
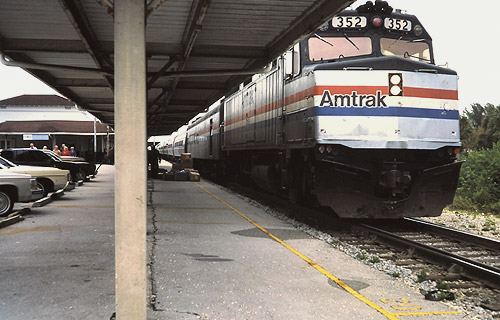
An Amtrak train at Hollywood in 1987

The original station, which is used solely by Amtrak, is a former Seaboard Air Line Railway depot designed in the prevalent Mediterranean Revival style by Gustav Maass of the West Palm Beach architectural firm Harvey & Clarke. Although the first Seaboard passenger train arrived in January 1927, the station did not open until 1928, in what was then a remote area of Hollywood.

The station consists of three distinct sections. The southern end of the building contains the passenger station, while the northern end consists of the freight room and docks. The center section of the station contains the baggage room. Entry into the passenger waiting room is through doors on the southern end. On the west side of the building is a separate entrance into what was, in keeping with racial segregation laws of the era, the "colored" waiting room; it was converted into railroad offices by the Seaboard in 1963.

Also in 1963, the Seaboard added a large Spanish-style barrel tile canopy to shelter the southern entrance, modifying the architectural details of the two entry porticos. At the same time, the railroad replaced the concrete-etched station signs on either end of the building with copper signs. The station is virtually identical to the Fort Lauderdale Seaboard station to the north.

The station was served by, among other Seaboard trains, the Orange Blossom Special until 1953, and the Silver Meteor beginning in 1939. Amtrak maintained Silver Meteor service to the station when it took over intercity passenger train service in 1971.

=== Tri-Rail commuter service ===
In 1988, through an agreement with CSX Transportation, the successor to Seaboard, the Florida Department of Transportation acquired the station as part of the state's South Florida Rail Corridor. In January 1989, the South Florida Regional Transportation Authority (SFRTA) began using the station as a Tri-Rail stop. While Amtrak is the long-term lessee of the original station's ticket office, waiting room, baggage room, and platform, and the city of Hollywood is the long-term lessee of the freight room, Tri-Rail uses additional facilities built immediately to north of the old depot. The station is the southernmost Tri-Rail stop in Broward County.

Due in part to Tri-Rail's presence, Amtrak trains only stop southbound to discharge passengers and stop northbound to receive passengers bound for points north of West Palm Beach. On 10 November 2024, the Silver Star was merged with the Capitol Limited as the Floridian.
