= Charlotte station (Seaboard Air Line Railroad) =

Historic building in North Carolina, US

- Seaboard Air Line Railroad Passenger Station
- U.S. National Register of Historic Places
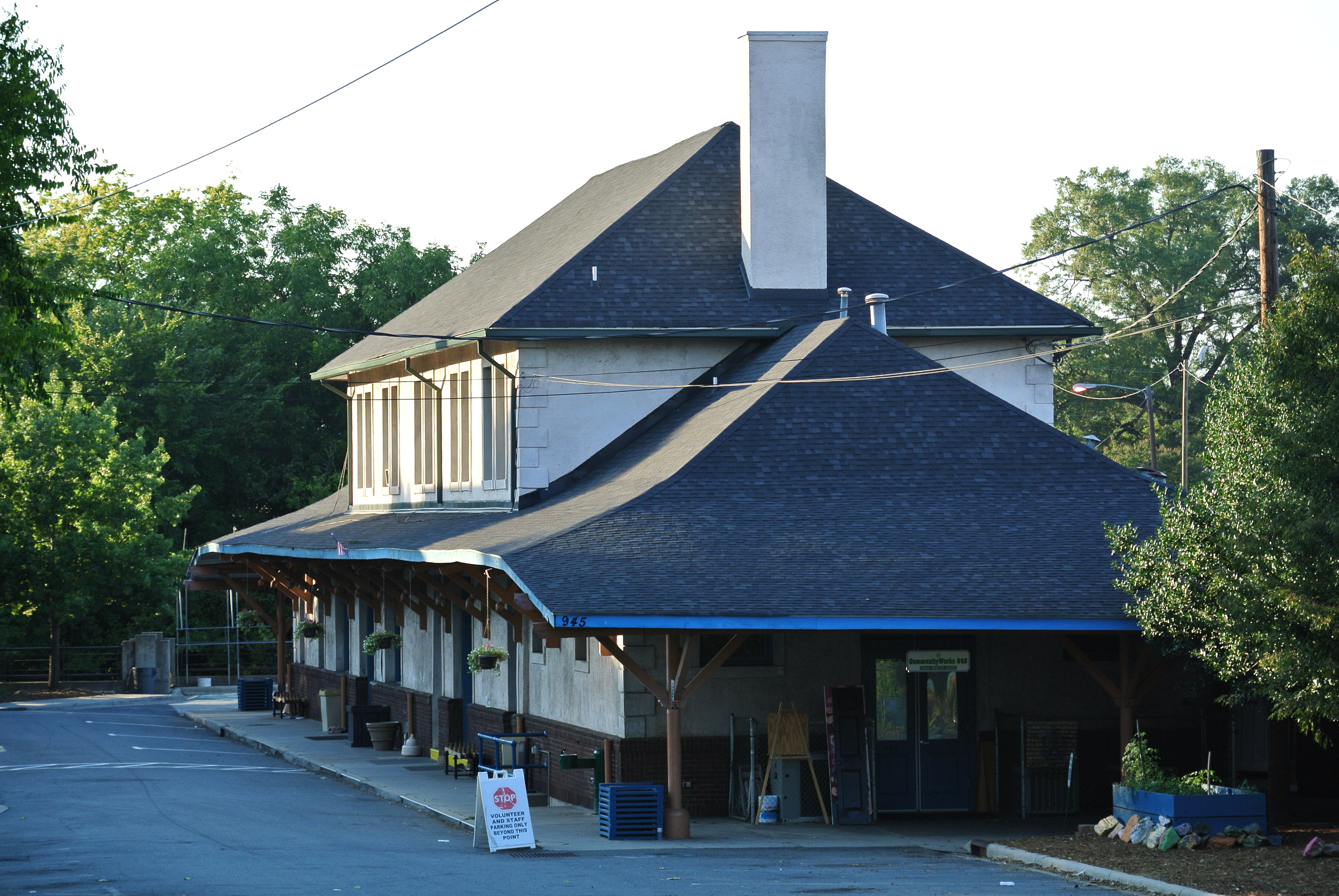
- Seaboard Air Line Railroad Passenger Station, June 2016

- Location within North Carolina Location within the United States
- Location: 945 N. College St., Charlotte, North Carolina
- Coordinates: 35°14′2″N 80°49′59″W
- Area: 1 acre (0.40 ha)
- Built: 1896, 1916-1917
- Architect: Hook, Charles Christian
- NRHP reference No.: 80002887
- Added to NRHP: October 24, 1980

Seaboard Air Line Railroad Passenger Station is a historic train station located at Charlotte, Mecklenburg County, North Carolina.

== History ==
The station was designed by architect Charles Christian Hook and built by the Seaboard Air Line Railroad. The station opened on June 16, 1896, and was extensively renovated and enlarged in 1916–1917. The red brick and pink stucco building consists of a two-story central section with one-story extensions. It features a wide umbrella shed that extends 300 feet along the trackside and is supported by 15 cast iron columns. It was 1 1/3 miles from the Southern Railway station of that time. In its final years the station was the western terminus for daily streamlined diesel-electric passenger trains to and from the SAL's Wilmington station, via Hamlet and Monroe. After 62 years, passenger service ceased on November 3, 1958, though the trackage remained in use for freight trains.

The building subsequently housed yard offices for the Seaboard Air Line, Seaboard Coast Line, the Seaboard System Railroad, and CSX Transportation. It was renovated in 1966. The station was listed on the National Register of Historic Places in 1980.

CSX Transportation, the successor to the Seaboard rail companies, vacated the building in January 1987, donating the station and leasing the property to the Charlotte-Mecklenburg Historic Landmarks Commission that October. Falling into disrepair, the station building and land were offered for sale in 1990. On January 20, 1991, an electrical fire badly burned the upper story, causing $15,000 worth of damage. The property's remote location and poor neighborhood, with a significant transient population, dissuaded potential investors, and the station became a target for vandalism and a stopping place for the homeless.

In late 1993, a coalition of four local churches together with business and political leaders purchased and renovated the property for $850,000. The former station opened on December 11, 1994, as the Charlotte Center for Urban Ministry, a soup kitchen and counseling and health services center for homeless people. Due to growth, in March 2006 the center's kitchens and administrative offices moved into a new building nearby, with the former station becoming the center's art studio and classroom building. The building was further renovated and refurbished in July 2012, with the benefit of a $50,000 grant from Maxwell House.

Preceding station	Seaboard Air Line Railroad	Following station
Paw Creek toward Rutherfordton	Carolina Central Railroad	Sardis toward Wilmington
