= Floridian (train) =

Amtrak service between Chicago and Florida

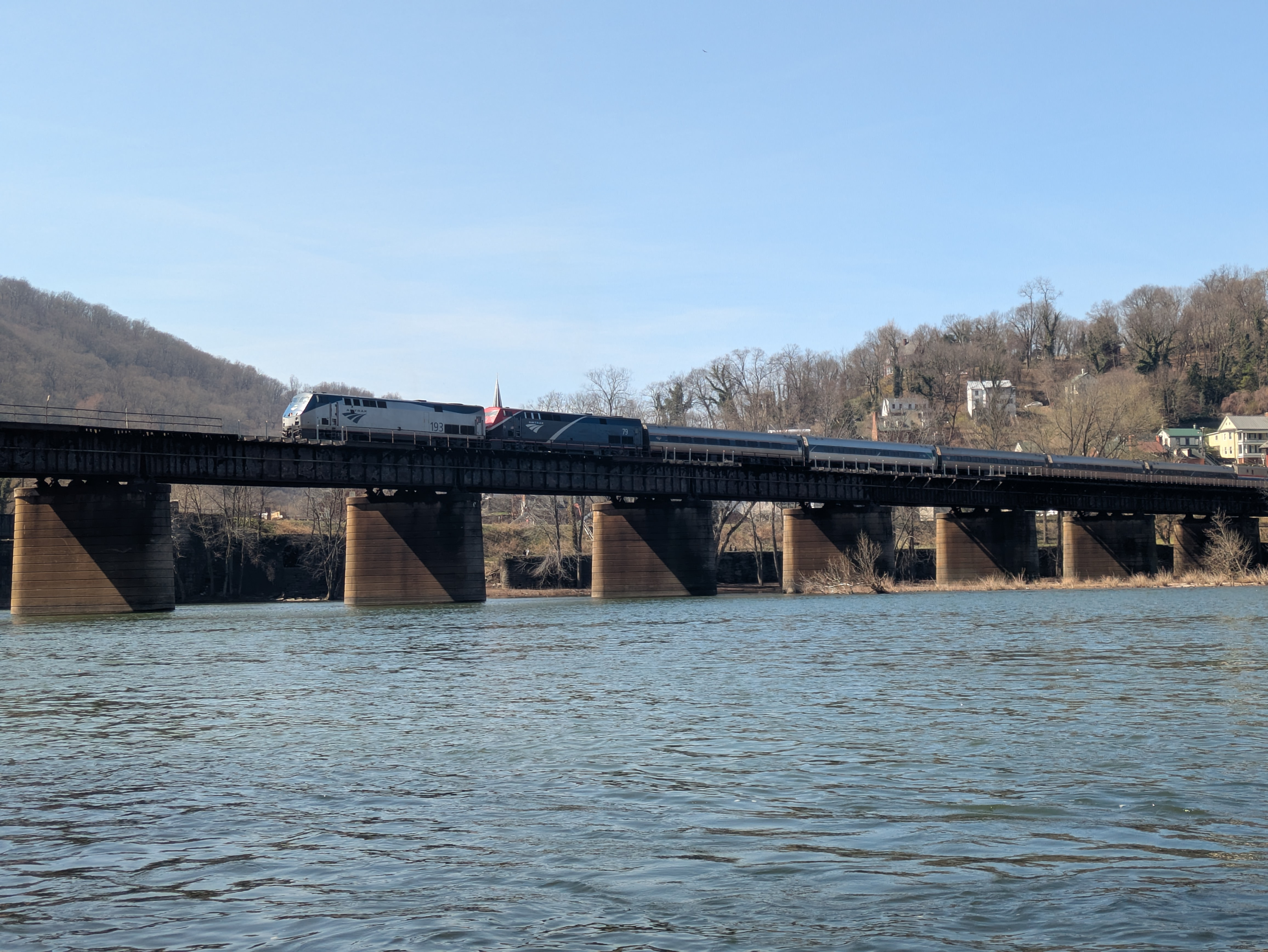
- The Floridian passing through Harpers Ferry, West Virginia, in March 2026

Overview
- Locale: Eastern United States
- Predecessor: Capitol Limited; Silver Star
- First service: November 10, 2024
- Current operator: Amtrak

Route
- Termini: Chicago, Illinois; Miami, Florida
- Stops: 46
- Distance travelled: 2,076 miles (3,341 km)
- Average journey time: 47 hours
- Service frequency: Daily
- Train number: 40, 41

On-board services
- Classes: Coach Class; First Class Sleeper Service
- Disabled access: All train cars, most stations
- Sleeping arrangements: Roomette (2 beds); Bedroom (2 beds); Bedroom Suite (4 beds); Accessible Bedroom (2 beds)
- Catering facilities: Dining car, Café
- Baggage facilities: Overhead racks, checked baggage available at selected stations

Technical
- Rolling stock: Amfleet · Viewliner
- Track gauge: 4 ft 8 1/2 in (1,435 mm) standard gauge
- Operating speed: 44 mph (71 km/h) (avg.); 79 mph (127 km/h) (top)
- Track owners: Amtrak, CSXT, NS, CFRC, SFRTA

The Floridian is an Amtrak long-distance passenger train that operates daily between Chicago, Illinois, and Miami, Florida, via Washington, D.C. and Tampa, Florida. Service officially began on November 10, 2024. The train was formed as a combination of two existing trains: the Capitol Limited, which operated overnight between Chicago and Washington, D.C., and the Silver Star, which operated overnight between New York City and Miami. Amtrak intends the train to be temporary, in response to planned rehabilitation work in the East River Tunnels, as well as a shortage of Superliner cars. It operates with single-level Amfleet and Viewliner passenger cars.

== History ==
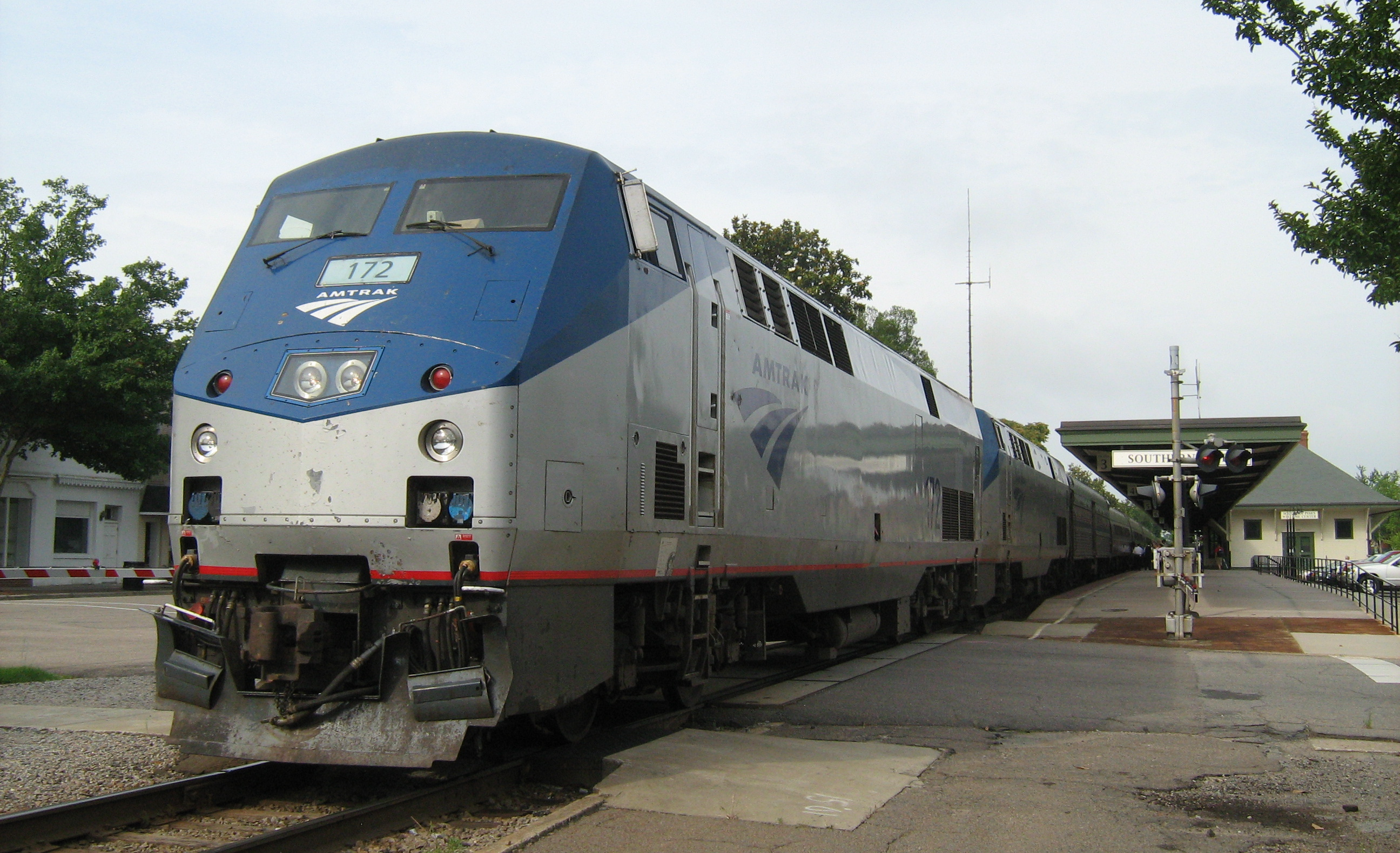
The Silver Star in North Carolina in 2009

Amtrak created the Capitol Limited in 1981 as a Washington section of the Chicago–New York Broadway Limited, with the split occurring in Pittsburgh. It became a fully separate train in 1986. The train gained bilevel Superliner cars in 1994. Amtrak inherited the Silver Star from the Seaboard Coast Line Railroad in 1971. Amtrak previously used the name Floridian for a Chicago–Miami service that ran from 1971 to 1979 via Louisville, Kentucky, Nashville, Tennessee, and Montgomery, Alabama.

Trains magazine speculated in July 2024 that Amtrak intended to combine the two trains, based on "circumstantial evidence gleaned from Amtrak’s booking site." Amtrak confirmed this speculation on September 23, 2024, announcing the temporary merger of the Capitol Limited and the Silver Star. The new train, called the Floridian, will use the entire route of the Capitol Limited between Chicago and Washington, D.C., and the route of the Silver Star between Washington, D.C. and Miami. It was reported that the combined train would use single-level Amfleet and Viewliner cars from the Silver Star and carry the train numbers 40 and 41, which were previously assigned to the Three Rivers and Broadway Limited. Amtrak cited two reasons for the move: reducing the number of movements through the East River Tunnels during planned reconstruction work, and meanwhile freeing up Superliner cars for use on Western long-distance trains.

== Route details ==
All stations previously served by the Capitol Limited and all stations south of D.C. previously served by the Silver Star when both services were suspended are served by the Floridian.

While most stations south of D.C. still have connections to the Northeast Corridor through other services such as the Carolinian, Palmetto, and Silver Meteor, several stations in Florida and the Carolinas are only served by the Floridian, meaning they no longer have direct service to the former terminus in New York. These include the stations in Southern Pines and Hamlet in North Carolina, Camden, Columbia, and Denmark in South Carolina, and Lakeland, Tampa, and Okeechobee in Florida.

== Equipment ==
The Floridian uses single-level Viewliner and Amfleet equipment, with a consist similar to that of the Silver Star. A typical Floridian has two GE P42DC or Siemens ALC-42 diesel locomotives, four Amfleet II coaches, an Amfleet cafe/lounge, a Viewliner diner, three Viewliner sleepers, and a Viewliner baggage car. The third sleeper was added in April 2025.

== Stations ==
State	City	Station	Connections
Illinois	Chicago	Chicago	Amtrak (long-distance): Borealis, California Zephyr, Cardinal, City of New Orleans, Empire Builder, Lake Shore Limited, Southwest Chief, Texas Eagle; Amtrak (intercity): Blue Water, Hiawatha, Illini and Saluki, Illinois Zephyr and Carl Sandburg, Lincoln Service, Pere Marquette, Wolverine; Amtrak Thruway; Metra: BNSF, Heritage Corridor, Milwaukee District North, Milwaukee District West, North Central Service, SouthWest Service; Chicago "L": Blue (at Clinton) Brown Orange Pink Purple (at Quincy); Intercity bus: Greyhound Lines, Megabus; CTA, Pace
Indiana	South Bend	South Bend	Amtrak: Lake Shore Liimited South Bend Transpo
Indiana	Elkhart	Elkhart	Amtrak: Lake Shore Liimited Interurban Trolley
Indiana	Waterloo	Waterloo	Amtrak: Lake Shore Liimited
Ohio	Toledo	Toledo	Amtrak: Lake Shore Liimited Amtrak Thruway Barons Bus Lines Greyhound Lines
Ohio	Sandusky	Sandusky	Amtrak: Lake Shore Liimited Sandusky Transit System: Purple Line GoBus: Grey Line
Ohio	Elyria	Elyria	Amtrak: Lake Shore Liimited
Ohio	Cleveland	Cleveland	Amtrak: Lake Shore Liimited RTA Rapid Transit: Waterfront
Ohio	Alliance	Alliance	Stark Area Regional Transit Authority
Pennsylvania	Pittsburgh	Pittsburgh	Amtrak: Pennsylvanian Local bus: Pittsburgh Regional Transit Intercity bus: Greyhound, FlixBus, Fullington Trailways
Pennsylvania	Connellsville	Connellsville	Fayette Area Coordinated Transportation
Maryland	Cumberland	Cumberland	Allegany County Transit BayRunner Shuttle
West Virginia	Martinsburg	Martinsburg	MARC: ■ Brunswick Line EPTA
West Virginia	Harpers Ferry	Harpers Ferry	MARC: ■ Brunswick Line EPTA
Maryland	Rockville	Rockville	MARC: ■ Brunswick Line Metro: Red Line Ride On Metrobus
District of Columbia	Washington	Washington, D.C.	Amtrak: Acela, Cardinal, Carolinian, Crescent, Northeast Regional, Palmetto, Silver Meteor, Vermonter, Amtrak Thruway to Charlottesville, Virginia MARC: ■ Brunswick Line, ■ Camden Line, ■ Penn Line VRE: ■ Manassas Line, ■ Fredericksburg Line Metro: Red Line Metrobus, MTA Maryland, Loudoun County Transit, OmniRide Intercity bus: Greyhound, Megabus, BestBus, Peter Pan, OurBus
Virginia	Alexandria	Alexandria	Amtrak: Cardinal, Carolinian, Crescent, Northeast Regional, Palmetto, Silver Meteor VRE: ■ Manassas Line, ■ Fredericksburg Line Metro: Blue Line, Yellow Line Metrobus, DASH
Virginia	Richmond	Richmond Staples Mill Road	Amtrak: Carolinian, Northeast Regional, Palmetto, Silver Meteor, Amtrak Thruway to Charlottesville, Virginia Greater Richmond Transit Company
Virginia	Ettrick	Petersburg	Amtrak: Carolinian, Northeast Regional, Palmetto, Silver Meteor Petersburg Area Transit
North Carolina	Rocky Mount	Rocky Mount	Amtrak: Carolinian, Palmetto, Silver Meteor Tar River Transit Greyhound Lines
North Carolina	Raleigh	Raleigh	Amtrak: Carolinian, Piedmont GoRaleigh, GoTriangle
North Carolina	Cary	Cary	Amtrak: Carolinian, Piedmont GoCary, GoTriangle
North Carolina	Southern Pines	Southern Pines	
North Carolina	Hamlet	Hamlet	
South Carolina	Camden	Camden	
South Carolina	Columbia	Columbia	The Comet
South Carolina	Denmark	Denmark	
Georgia	Savannah	Savannah	Amtrak: Palmetto, Silver Meteor
Florida	Jacksonville	Jacksonville	Amtrak: Silver Meteor, Amtrak Thruway to Waldo, Ocala, Gainesville, The Villages, Wildwood, Dade City, Lakeland Jacksonville Transportation Authority
Florida	Palatka	Palatka	Amtrak: Silver Meteor The Ride Solution
Florida	DeLand	DeLand	Amtrak: Silver Meteor, Amtrak Thruway to Daytona Beach SunRail Votran
Florida	Winter Park	Winter Park	Amtrak: Silver Meteor SunRail LYNX Bus
Florida	Orlando	Orlando	Amtrak: Silver Meteor, Amtrak Thruway to Lakeland, Tampa, St. Petersburg, Bradenton, Sarasota, Port Charlotte, Fort Myers SunRail LYNX Bus
Florida	Kissimmee	Kissimmee	Amtrak: Silver Meteor SunRail LYNX Bus Greyhound Lines
Florida	Lakeland	Lakeland	Amtrak Thruway to Dade City, Wildwood, The Villages, Gainesville, Ocala, Waldo Jacksonville, Orlando, Tampa, St. Petersburg, Bradenton, Sarasota, Port Charlotte, Fort Myers Citrus Connection Greyhound Lines
Florida	Tampa	Tampa	Amtrak Thruway to Dade City, Wildwood, The Villages, Gainesville, Ocala, Waldo, Jacksonville, Lakeland, Orlando, St. Petersburg, Bradenton, Sarasota, Port Charlotte, Fort Myers Hillsborough Area Regional Transit
Florida	Winter Haven	Winter Haven	Amtrak: Silver Meteor
Florida	Sebring	Sebring	Amtrak: Silver Meteor
Florida	Okeechobee	Okeechobee	
Florida	West Palm Beach	West Palm Beach	Amtrak: Silver Meteor Tri-Rail Brightline (at West Palm Beach) Palm Tran, Tri-Rail Commuter Connector, West Palm Beach Downtown Trolley Greyhound Lines
Florida	Delray Beach	Delray Beach	Amtrak: Silver Meteor Tri-Rail Palm Tran, Downtown Connector
Florida	Deerfield Beach	Deerfield Beach	Amtrak: Silver Meteor Tri-Rail Broward County Transit, Tri-Rail Commuter Connector
Florida	Fort Lauderdale	Fort Lauderdale	Amtrak: Silver Meteor Tri-Rail Broward County Transit, Metrobus, Sun Trolley, Tri-Rail Commuter Connector
Florida	Hollywood	Hollywood	Amtrak: Silver Meteor Tri-Rail Broward County Transit, Hallandale Beach Community Bus
Florida	Miami	Miami	Amtrak: Silver Meteor Metrobus
