= Miami station (Amtrak) =

Amtrak rail station

Miami, FL
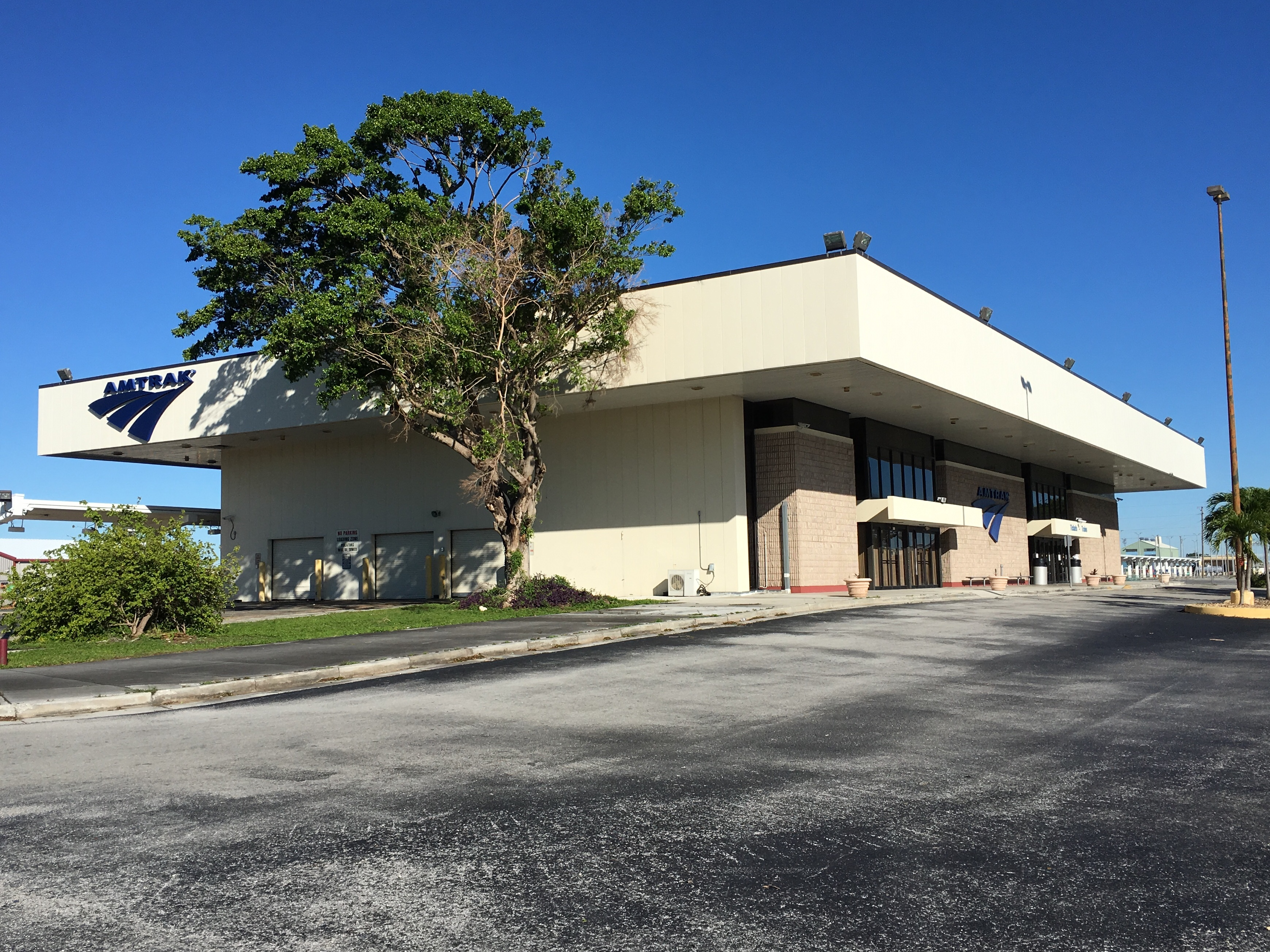
- Miami station in October 2017

General information
- Location: 8303 NW 37th Avenue; Miami, Florida; United States
- Coordinates: 25°50′59″N 80°15′29″W
- Owner: Amtrak
- Platforms: 2 island platforms
- Tracks: 3

Construction
- Parking: Yes
- Accessible: Yes

Other information
- Station code: Amtrak: MIA

History
- Opened: June 20, 1978

Passengers
- FY 2025: 89,463 (Amtrak)

Services
Preceding station	Amtrak	Following station
Terminus	Floridian	Hollywood toward Chicago
Terminus	Silver Meteor	Hollywood toward New York
Former services
Preceding station	Amtrak	Following station
Terminus	Palmetto 2002–2004	Hollywood toward New York
Terminus	Silver Palm 1996–2002	Hollywood toward New York
Terminus	Silver Star	Hollywood toward New York
Hollywood toward Los Angeles	Sunset Limited 1993–1996	Terminus
Terminus	Silver Palm 1982–1985	Hollywood toward Tampa
Terminus	Floridian 1978–1979	Hollywood toward Chicago
Location

Miami station is a train station in Miami-Dade County, Florida, on the border of Miami and Hialeah. It is the southern terminus for Amtrak's Floridian and Silver Meteor trains. The station opened in 1978 to replace a 48-year-old Seaboard Air Line Railroad station. It is several blocks away from the Tri-Rail and Metrorail Transfer Station, but there is no direct connection between the two.

== History ==
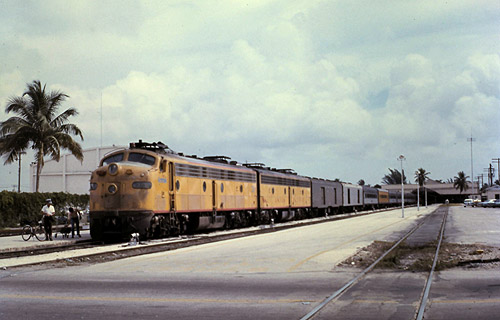
An Amtrak train at the ex-Seaboard Air Line Railroad station in 1972

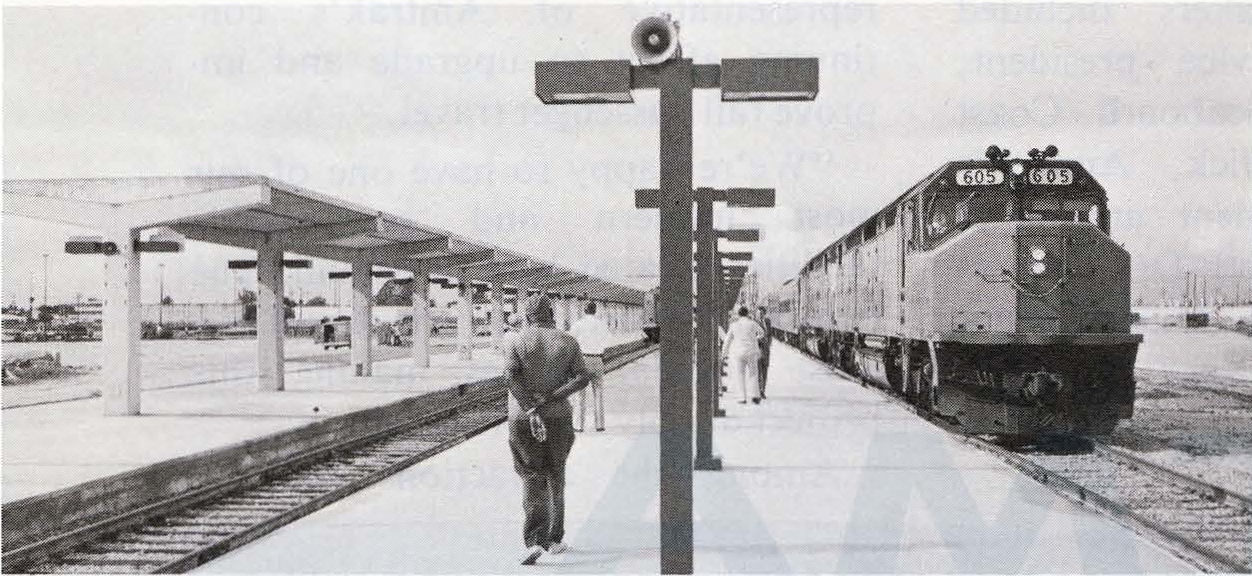
The Silver Meteor departs on June 20, 1978 – the first train to use the new station

When Amtrak took over intercity passenger service in May 1971, it continued to use the former Seaboard Air Line Railroad (SAL) depot at 2210 NW 7th Avenue in Allapattah, two miles north of downtown. The SAL station, built in 1930, soon began to show its age. On May 13, 1977, Amtrak began construction of a new station near the SAL's Hialeah Yards.

Opened on June 20, 1978, the building is one of many built under Amtrak's Standard Stations Program, an attempt to create a unified brand and identity for the company's passenger facilities in its early years. It is considered a Type 300A station, meaning it was designed to accommodate at least 300 passengers at the busiest hour of the day. It is nearly identical to the now closed Midway station in Saint Paul, Minnesota, which was also built in 1978.

The building measures 85 feet (26 m) by 175 feet (53 m) with 20,000 square feet (1,900 m^{2}) of floor space, with a large waiting room and other passenger facilities on the ground floor. A mezzanine houses a lounge and Amtrak regional offices. The $5.7 million station construction project ($28.1 million in 2025 adjusted for inflation) included the fully handicapped accessible station, a 269-car parking lot, and two 2,000 foot (610 m)-long platforms to handle Amtrak's lengthy Florida trains. A loop track runs around the station complex, allowing trains to be turned around for their northbound trips. The last trains arrived at the ex-SAL station on June 19, 1978; the northbound Silver Meteor departed from the new station on June 20 shortly before the ribbon-cutting ceremony.

In the early 1990s, the Florida Department of Transportation (FDOT) began planning an intermodal station to connect Tri-Rail, Amtrak, and Metrorail with Miami International Airport. These plans were completed as the Miami Intermodal Center, located 4 miles (6.4 km) south of the former Amtrak station and the same distance west of downtown Miami. Metrorail service to the station began in 2012, followed by Tri-Rail service in April 2015. Amtrak was initially expected to begin serving the station in 2016. A design error, however, resulted in platforms that were too short to accommodate Amtrak's longer seasonal trains. When stopped at the station, the final cars of these trains would have blocked the grade crossing at NW 25th Street.

After revisions to traffic patterns around the station, Amtrak was expected to relocate to the Miami Intermodal Center in late 2018. These revisions included the installation of signage to direct motorists to the grade crossing at NW 28th Street when the NW 25th Street crossing was expected to be blocked. Extended blockages could occur when a long Amtrak train was stopped at the station. By late 2018, the relocation had been postponed indefinitely.

In 2021, Amtrak contacted FDOT to resume negotiations regarding service at the Miami Intermodal Center. Test train operations began in February 2022, with discussions ongoing at that time. On November 10, 2024, the Silver Star was merged with the Capitol Limited to form the Floridian.

In December 2024, Amtrak informed transportation officials that it would not proceed with plans to operate from the Miami Intermodal Center, citing projected operating costs. According to Amtrak, relocating service to the center was estimated to add approximately 20,000 annual passengers and $2 million in revenue, while increasing operating costs by $5 million. Renovations required for Amtrak service at the intermodal center were estimated at $6.4 million, compared with $21.8 million to renovate the existing station to meet accessibility requirements.

== Station layout ==
The station has three tracks with two low-level platforms. The station building is located south of Track 1 and directly adjacent to the eastern platform.
