= Miami station (Seaboard Air Line Railroad) =

Amtrak rail station

Miami, FL
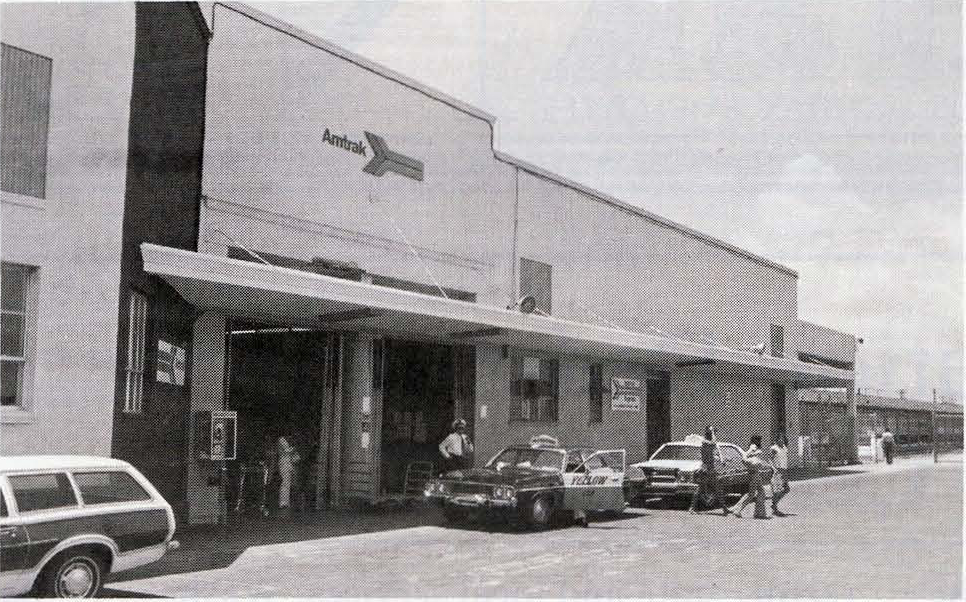
- The station in June 1978

General information
- Location: 2210 NW 7th Avenue; Miami, Florida; United States
- Coordinates: 25.7984°N 80.2075°W
- Line: Seaboard Air Line Railway

History
- Opened: 1927
- Closed: June 19, 1978
- Rebuilt: 1930
- Original company: Seaboard Air Line Railroad

Former services
Preceding station	Amtrak	Following station
Terminus	Silver Star	Hollywood toward New York
Terminus	Silver Meteor	Hollywood toward New York
Terminus	Floridian	Hollywood toward Chicago
Preceding station	Seaboard Air Line Railroad	Following station
Terminus	Main Line	Hialeah toward Richmond
Location

Miami station was an intercity passenger station originally built for the Seaboard Air Line Railroad (SAL). The first SAL train to Miami arrived on January 8, 1927, and the station building was constructed in 1930. The depot was located at 2210 NW 7th Avenue in Allapattah, two miles (3.2 km) north of downtown. When Amtrak took over control of passenger services in 1971, it consolidated its interstate routes here. The station soon began to show its age, and on May 13, 1977, Amtrak began construction of a new station near the SAL's Hialeah Yards. Service was moved to the new station after June 19, 1978.
