= Lake Shore and Michigan Southern Railroad Depot =

The Lake Shore and Michigan Southern Railroad Depot, or Lake Shore and Michigan Southern Railroad Station may refer to the following former and active train stations previously used by the Lake Shore and Michigan Southern Railway.

== New York ==
- Westfield station

== Ohio ==
- Ashtabula station
- Conneaut station
- Jefferson station (Lake Shore and Michigan Southern Railway)
- Mentor station
- Oberlin station
- Painesville station
- Sandusky station
- Wauseon station

== Pennsylvania ==
- North East station
