= Lake City station (disambiguation) =

Lake City station may refer to:

- Lake City station (Florida), former Amtrak station in Lake City, Florida, US
- Lake City station (Iowa), former Chicago & North Western Railroad station in Lake City, Iowa, US
- Lake City station (Minnesota), former Milwaukee Road station in Lake City, Minnesota US
- Lake City station (Pennsylvania), former New York Central and Pennsylvania Railroad station in Lake City, Pennsylvania, US
- Lake City Way station, SkyTrain station in Metro Vancouver, British Columbia, Canada
