= Lake City station (Pennsylvania) =

Railroad depot in Pennsylvania, United States

Lake City
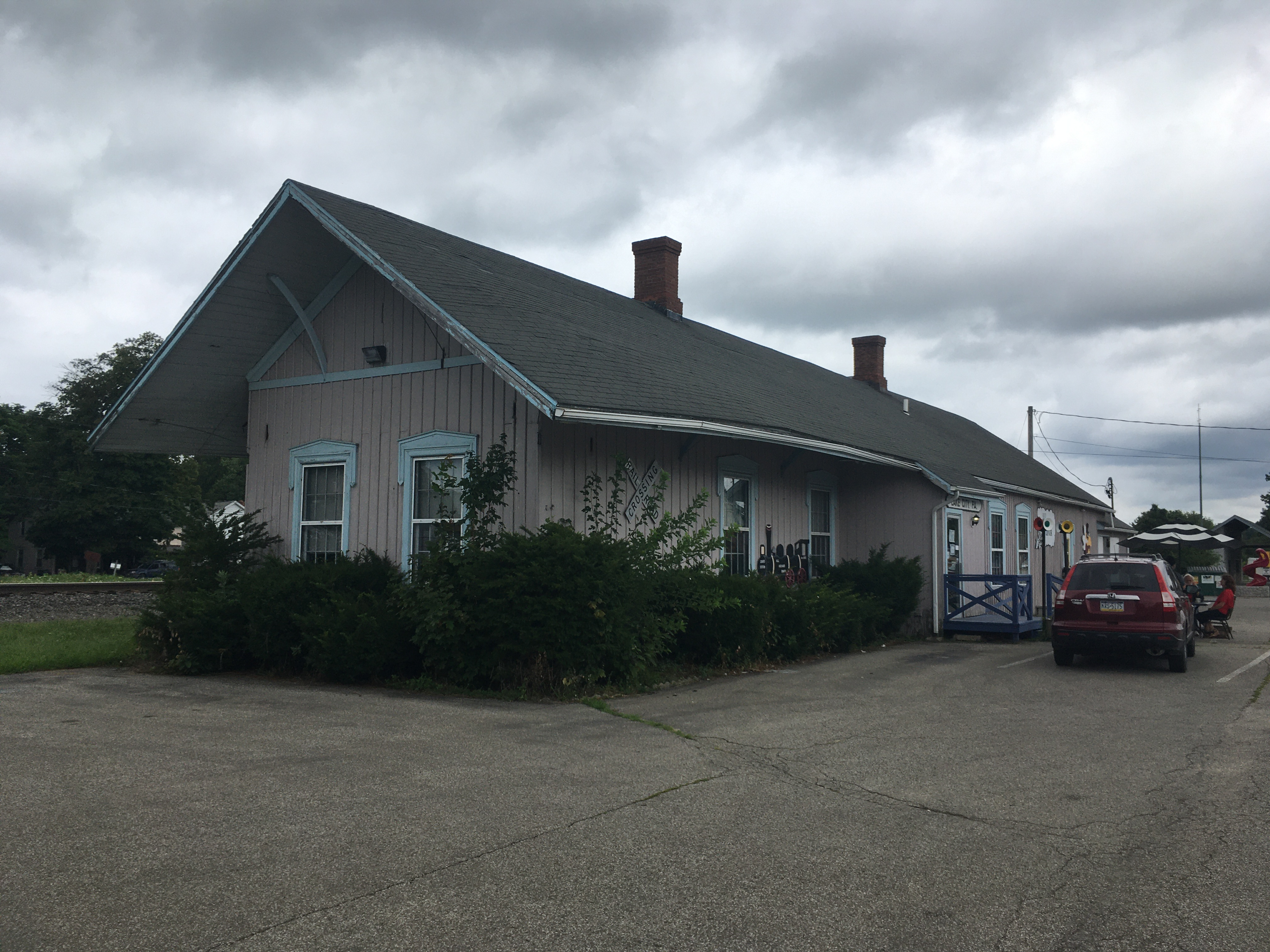
- Lake City station in August 2020

General information
- Location: Lake City, Pennsylvania
- Coordinates: 42.01509°N 80.34332°W
- Owner: Glen and Lisa Shinko (2000–present)
- Operator: Franklin Canal Company (1852–1854) Cleveland, Painesville and Ashtabula Railroad (1854–1869) Erie and Pittsburgh Railroad (1860–1870) Lake Shore & Michigan Southern Railway (1869–1914) Pennsylvania Company (1870–1918) New York Central Railroad (1914–1957) Pennsylvania Railroad (1918–1940s)

History
- Opened: 1852
- Closed: 1957
- Former names: Girard (1852–c. 1906); North Girard (c. 1906–1954)

Former services
Preceding station	New York Central Railroad	Following station
Springfield, PA toward Chicago	Main Line	Fairview toward New York
Preceding station	Pennsylvania Railroad	Following station
Albion toward Pittsburgh	Erie – Pittsburgh	Fairview toward Erie
Location

Lake City is a former railroad depot located on Rice Avenue in Lake City, Pennsylvania. The station opened in 1852, and a freight depot once stood across the tracks on Railroad Street.

== History ==
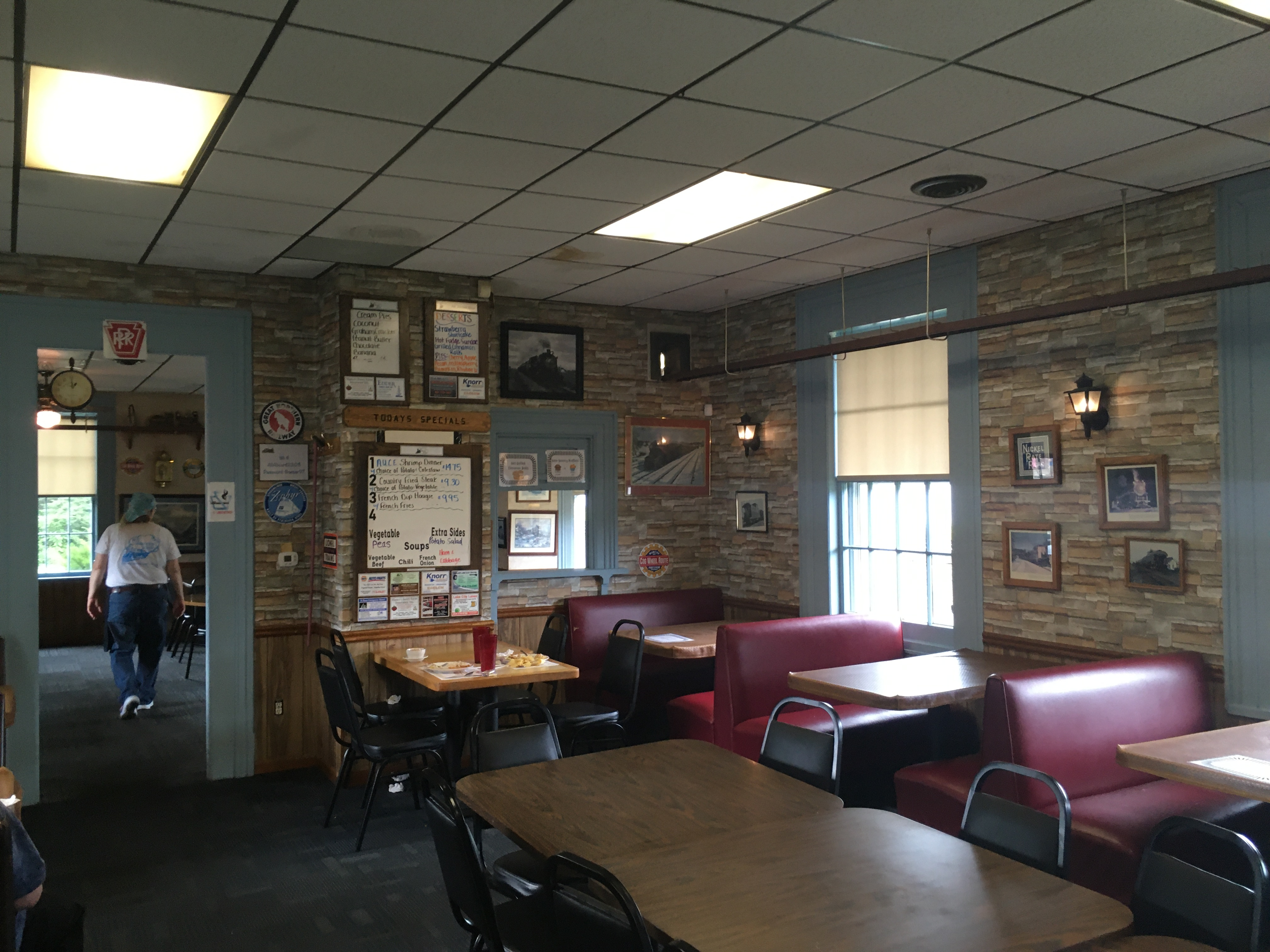
All Aboard Dinor interior

The depot served the Water Level Route of the New York Central Railroad and its predecessors for more than 100 years. The depot also served the Pittsburgh–Erie trains of the Pennsylvania Railroad, the NYCR's main competitor. While the station was located in the village of Miles Grove, the Girard name stuck until the 1950s, presumably due to the proximity of the village of Girard or being within Girard Township. After the end of service in the late 1950s, the station sat unused until it was repurposed as a diner in 1993. The diner is currently known as the All Aboard Dinor.
