= John E. Gunckel =

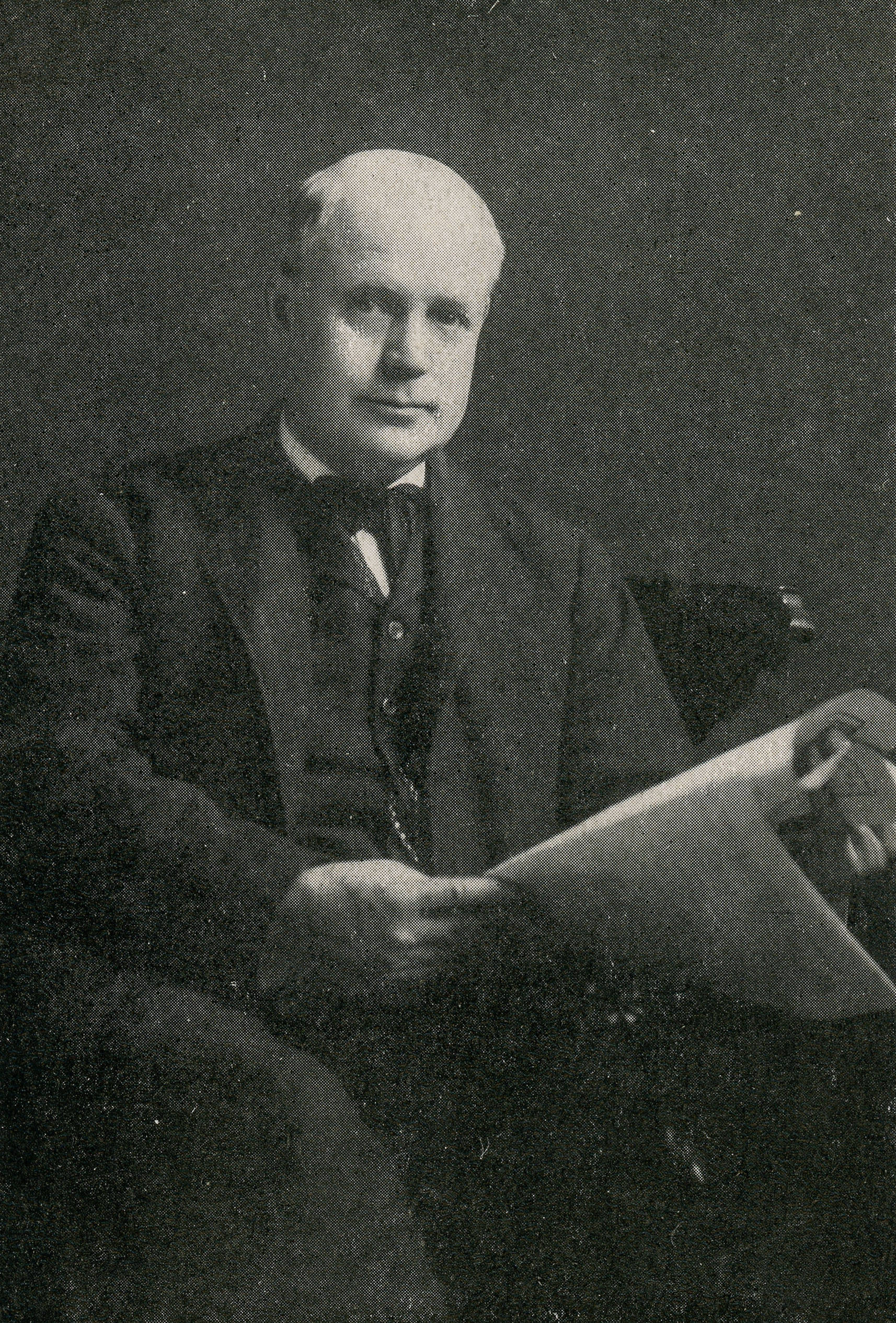
John E. Gunckel (1846–1915), Toledo, Ohio

John E. Gunckel (1846–1915) was a passenger agent with the Lake Shore and Michigan Southern Railway who began forming the Toledo, Ohio, Old Newsboys Goodfellow Association in the 1890s and saw its incorporation in 1929.
