= Union Station (Erie, Pennsylvania) =

Railroad station in Erie, Pennsylvania

Union Station Erie, PA
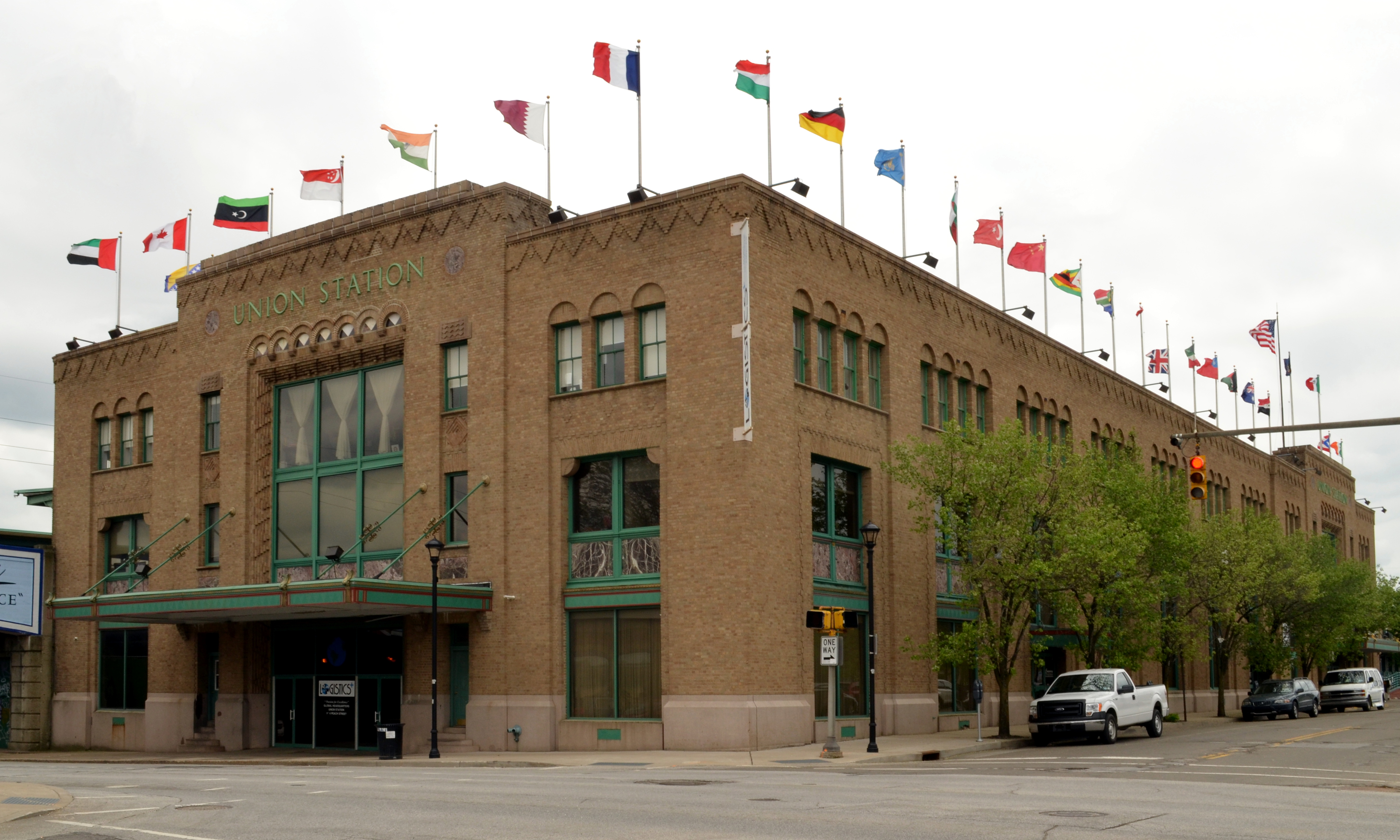

General information
- Location: 125 West 14th Street; Erie, Pennsylvania; United States
- Coordinates: 42°07′15″N 80°04′55″W
- Owner: Logistics Plus
- Line: Lake Shore Subdivision
- Platforms: 2 island platforms
- Tracks: 5
- Connections: EMTA: 20A

Construction
- Parking: 5 short-term, 5 long-term
- Accessible: Yes
- Architect: Alfred T. Fellheimer, Steward Wagner
- Architectural style: Art Deco

Other information
- Station code: Amtrak: ERI

History
- Opened: December 3, 1927
- Rebuilt: 2003

Passengers
- FY 2025: 18,294 ▲1.4% (Amtrak)

Services
| Preceding station | Amtrak | Following station |
|---|---|---|
| Cleveland toward Chicago | Lake Shore Limited | Buffalo–Depew toward New York or Boston South |
Former services
| Preceding station | Amtrak | Following station |
|---|---|---|
| Cleveland toward Chicago | Lake Shore | Buffalo toward New York (Grand Central) |
| Preceding station | New York Central Railroad | Following station |
| Swanville toward Chicago | Main Line | Harbor Creek toward New York |
| Preceding station | Pennsylvania Railroad | Following station |
| Terminus | Erie – Harrisburg | Waterford toward Harrisburg |
| Swanville toward Pittsburgh | Erie – Pittsburgh | Terminus |
Location

Union Station is an Amtrak railroad station and mixed-use commercial building in downtown Erie, Pennsylvania, United States. It is served by the Lake Shore Limited route, which provides daily passenger service between Chicago and (via two sections east of Albany) New York City or Boston; Erie is the train's only stop in Pennsylvania. The station's ground floor has been redeveloped into commercial spaces, including The Brewerie at Union Station, a brewpub. The building itself is privately owned by the global logistics and freight management company Logistics Plus and serves as its headquarters.

The first railroad station in Erie was established in 1851 but was replaced with the Romanesque Revival-style Union Depot in 1866. Through a series of mergers and acquisitions by competing railroad companies which started not long after the establishment of Erie's first railroads, Union Depot became jointly owned and operated by the New York Central and Pennsylvania railroads. To meet the changing needs of the rapidly growing city, planners designed a more modern structure to replace the original depot. The new Art Deco Union Station, dedicated on December 3, 1927, was the first railroad station of that style in the United States.

While Union Station was busy from its opening and through World War II, passenger rail service began to dwindle after the war when air and highway travel became more popular. By the 1960s, the New York Central drastically cut service, while the Pennsylvania abandoned service to Erie altogether. Both railroads were merged in 1968 to form Penn Central, and passenger rail was transferred from Penn Central to Amtrak in 1971. At one point, from 1972 to 1975, even Amtrak service in Erie was suspended. With reduced demand for train travel, Union Station was neglected and allowed to decay until Logistics Plus bought it in 2003. Since then it has been restored, with portions re-purposed as commercial and retail space.

== Design ==
Union Station is in downtown Erie on West 14th Street between Peach and Sassafras Streets. Designed by architects Alfred T. Fellheimer and Steward Wagner, it was the first Art Deco railroad station to be designed and built in the United States. Previously, Fellheimer had been influential in the design of Grand Central Terminal in New York City, and both architects collaborated on several railroad stations for the New York Central Railroad, including Buffalo Central Terminal in 1929 and Cincinnati Union Terminal in 1933.

The main building of Erie's Union Station, three stories tall, is of steel and masonry construction. The entire exterior is clad in "rough brown" brick and sandstone layered in a Flemish bond, trimmed in terracotta, and lined with granite at the ground level. The main station building has a frontage of 116 feet (35 m) along Peach Street and 206 feet (63 m) on 14th Street; a narrow two-story extension continues another 403 feet (123 m) towards Sassafras before terminating at a small, attached office building. The extension eased the transfer of mail, baggage, and freight between trains and street level while the offices of the freight company were housed in the attached building at the Sassafras Street end of the station complex.

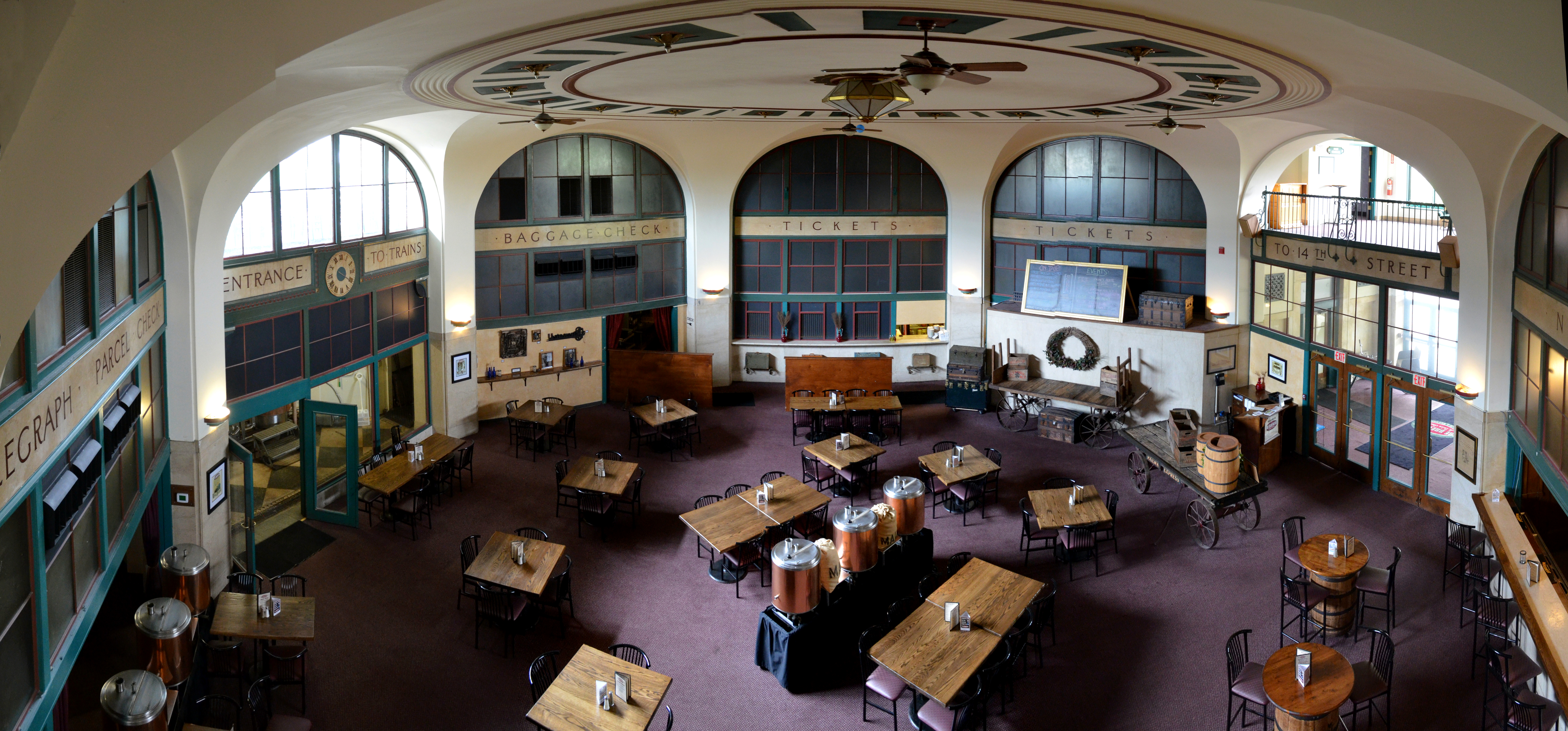
The eight-sided rotunda in Union Station

When the station initially opened, entrances from 14th Street opened into a large, octagonal rotunda where ticket offices, checked baggage, and a newsstand were located. As the railroad tracks are grade separated behind Union Station, the platforms are accessed by a pedestrian tunnel under the tracks with stairs that lead to the platforms. The tunnel entrance is directly across the rotunda from the street entrance—a portion of which is now used as the kitchen for a brewpub housed inside the station. The concourse, off the rotunda, led to the Peach Street entrances, and contained space for a soda fountain, a barber shop, and telegraph offices, as well as access to the station's 111-by-35-foot (34 m × 11 m) waiting room. Facing Peach Street, a dining room and lunch counter run by the Union News Company, which operated the majority of the dining services in New York Central stations, were at the opposite end of Union Station from the rotunda. The entire ground floor was laid with terrazzo featuring a mosaic border and Botticino marble paneling along the plaster walls. A green and tan color scheme was originally used throughout the entire building. Superintendents for both the New York Central and Pennsylvania railroads, as well as other railroad officials, had offices on the second floor of Union Station.

The station's low-level, concrete platforms are approximately 450 feet (137 m) long covered by steel, "butterfly-style" canopies with wooden roof decking. New York Central made use of four tracks situated on two island platforms; the Pennsylvania Railroad used two tracks on a single island platform. A network of tunnels beneath the station facilitated the transfer of mail to and from the former Griswold Plaza Post Office nearby. A bomb shelter, still stocked with cases of "U.S. Civil Defense All-Purpose Survival Crackers" from the early 1960s, is next to the station's boiler room and its three coal-fed furnaces.

== History ==
During the 1840s and 1850s, a flurry of railroad-building activity led to the completion of four separate railroads converging in Erie. A break of gauge between the first two railroads—the Erie and North East Railroad and the Franklin Canal Company—ensured that the citizens of Erie profited from the delays necessary to transfer cargo between the lines. When it was proposed in 1853 to standardize the track gauge to allow through traffic, a conflict that became known as the Erie Gauge War ensued. The residents of Erie, who saw it as an affront to their desire that the city become a major lake port, dismantled railroad bridges and tore up railroad tracks in the city in an effort to prevent the impending standardization. As part of the dispute's settlement, both railroads provided financial support for the construction of the Erie and Pittsburgh and Sunbury and Erie railroads. The Cleveland, Painesville and Ashtabula Railroad acquired the Franklin Canal Company in 1854, and the Erie and North East was merged with the Buffalo and State Line to form the Buffalo and Erie Railroad a few years later. The Sunbury and Erie was renamed the Philadelphia and Erie Railroad in 1861. The Pennsylvania Railroad soon acquired the Sunbury and Erie through a 999-year lease and funded completion of the line by 1864.

=== Predecessor stations ===
The first railroad station in Erie was built in 1851 and consisted of a "clumsy looking" or "rude brick structure". President-elect Abraham Lincoln addressed a crowd outside of this station on February 16, 1861, while traveling to Washington, D.C. for his inauguration. Construction on a new station was started in early 1865 as a joint venture between the Cleveland, Painesville and Ashtabula and the Buffalo and Erie railroads, and was completed in February 1866. Both the Erie and Pittsburgh and the Philadelphia and Erie railroads also leased portions of the new station for their services. In addition to the leased space, the Philadelphia and Erie continued to maintain a freight station on State Street below Hamot Hospital for several years afterward.

The station, known as Union Depot, consisted of a brick Romanesque Revival structure facing Peach Street between two sets of railroad tracks. It stood 40 feet (10 m) tall, topped with a distinctive cupola, and its platforms extended 480 feet (150 m) towards Sassafras Street along both sides of the depot. The depot was equipped with the modern amenities of the day including outdoor gas lighting, a barber shop, gentleman's and ladies' parlors, and a dining room; the second floor contained offices and sleeping quarters for railroad officials.

The Cleveland, Painesville and Ashtabula became the Lake Shore and Michigan Southern Railway in 1869, and absorbed the Buffalo and Erie Railroad later that year. The Pennsylvania Railroad leased the Erie and Pittsburgh for 999 years in 1870. On March 5, 1902, nearly 10,000 people turned out at Union Depot to greet Prince Henry of Prussia during his tour of the United States; the prince remained in Erie for approximately 10 minutes before his train continued to Buffalo and Niagara Falls, New York. On December 22, 1914, the Lake Shore and Michigan Southern Railroad was merged with the New York Central.

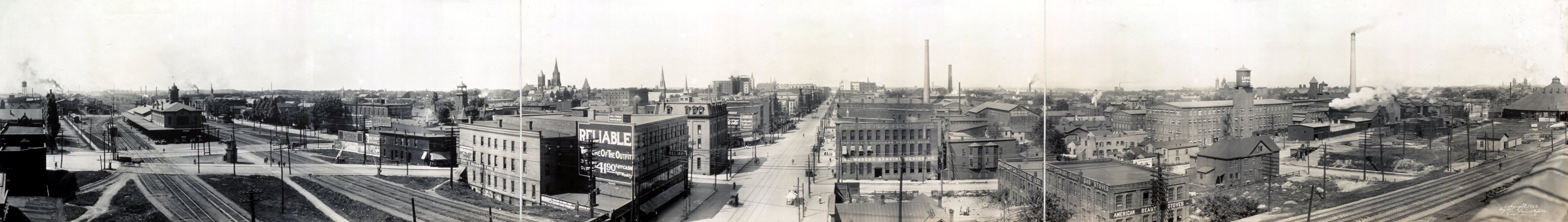
Panorama of downtown Erie in 1912, looking along the railroad tracks. Union Depot (left) is on Peach Street between the railroad tracks. Note the level crossings.

=== Construction ===
In 1913, the city of Erie appointed a committee of city planners and civil engineers led by John Nolen that was tasked with determining the best course of action to support the continued growth of the city. In its final report, the committee recommended, among other civic improvements, that "for the improvement of the railroad facilities in Erie" a new Union Station be constructed, as well as the "abolition of all [railroad] crossings". At the time, the only streets in Erie where the railroad was grade separated were State, French, and Ash Streets, and Buffalo Road, while the remainder had level crossings. The committee felt it was desirable that, on account of Erie's topography and the existing railroad grades, the tracks be raised in the downtown to accommodate new roadway underpasses. The city signed an agreement on September 30, 1915, with the New York Central and the Pennsylvania railroads to eliminate every level crossing between Ash and Cascade Streets through the construction of bridges or the closing of the streets. As compensation, both railroads pledged to replace Union Depot with a new station.

The work to re-grade and install drainage on Peach and Sassafras Streets coincided with the building of the station from 1925 to 1927, and cost the city approximately $110,000 (equivalent to $2.04 million in 2025). A temporary station was also erected at 14th and French Streets, and was used after the old Union Depot was demolished in 1925 until the completion of the new station. Union Station was dedicated on December 3, 1927, in a ceremony presided over by the presidents of the New York Central and Pennsylvania railroads, the mayor of Erie Joseph Williams, and former mayor William Stern who helped initiate the project. The Griswold Plaza Post Office, on the north side of 14th Street, opened in 1932 along with the tunnel connecting it to Union Station.

=== Operations ===
When service from Union Station was inaugurated in 1928, both eastbound and westbound trains were departing the station almost every hour bound for destinations across the United States. Passengers in the station's expansive waiting room could patronize its news stand, telegraph office, barber shop, shoeshine stand, or its lunch counter and soda fountain. Train schedules were handwritten on a large blackboard, while station staff announced the arrival and impending departures of the trains by megaphone.

In the 1930s, the New York Central provided the majority of the service in Erie with over 20 trains daily, including the original Lake Shore Limited and the New England States. The famed 20th Century Limited, however, passed through Union Station nightly without stopping. Union Station was on the New York Central's main line, often referred to as the "Water Level Route", with trains that traveled west to Cleveland, Toledo and Chicago, and east to Buffalo, New York City, and Boston. The New York Central also had the Pittsburgh-Buffalo Express and other service from Erie, to Ashtabula, then via a branch line to Youngstown, Ohio, along the Pittsburgh and Lake Erie Railroad. The NYC's Southwestern Limited went southwest to St. Louis. The company's Ohio State Limited went southwest to Cincinnati.

Conversely, the Pennsylvania Railroad ran only a few trains from Erie—mainly the Northern and Southern Expresses to Wiliamsport, Harrisburg, Philadelphia, and Washington, D.C., as well as a daily train to Pittsburgh.

The Bliley Electric Company, a manufacturer of crystal oscillators used in radio transmitters and receivers, moved from 8th and Peach Streets to space on the second floor of Union Station in 1933. Despite the possibility that soot and vibrations from passing locomotives could cause calibration problems for Bliley's quartz crystals, Union Station's proximity to the railroad provided "efficient transfers of [the] heavy crystal stock from the train to the [crystal] slicing department." Bliley Electric soon grew to occupy the entire second and third floors of the station. During World War II, the company operated 24 hours a day and employed local women to grind and fashion the crystals; the crystals used in the operation were stockpiled in the rail yard, where it and the entire complex were guarded by soldiers with Great Danes. Bliley Electric eventually moved its entire operation to a larger, purpose-built facility in 1966.

=== Decline ===
Historical ridership
| Year | Pass. | ±% |
|---|---|---|
| 2007 | 10,182 | — |
| 2008 | 11,855 | +16.4% |
| 2009 | 12,668 | +6.9% |
| 2010 | 14,833 | +17.1% |
| 2011 | 15,859 | +6.9% |
| 2012 | 17,794 | +12.2% |
| 2013 | 18,108 | +1.8% |
| 2014 | 18,312 | +1.1% |
| 2015 | 16,633 | −9.2% |
| 2016 | 16,273 | −2.2% |
| 2017 | 16,766 | +3.0% |
| 2018 | 14,974 | −10.7% |
| 2019 | 15,573 | +4.0% |
| 2020 | 10,175 | −34.7% |
| 2021 | 9,001 | −11.5% |
| 2022 | 13,389 | +48.8% |
| 2023 | 15,236 | +13.8% |
| 2024 | 18,035 | +18.4% |
| 2025 | 18,294 | +1.4% |

The post-war boom in automobile travel and the construction of the Interstate Highway System, as well as competition from commercial airlines, led to the decline of passenger rail. The Pennsylvania Railroad eliminated passenger service between Erie and Pittsburgh in April 1948. It eventually ended through service to Philadelphia, requiring passengers to transfer in Emporium, Pennsylvania, and discontinued service from Erie altogether on March 27, 1965. By 1968, the number of New York Central trains was also reduced to five per day. The two railroads were merged on February 1, 1968, and formed the Penn Central Transportation Company. Penn Central continued to run the former New York Central passenger trains, until the last departed Union Station on April 30, 1971. The newly created National Passenger Rail Corporation, more commonly known as Amtrak, took over nationwide passenger rail operations the next day. Amtrak continued to operate a New York-to-Chicago train until January 1972, the Lake Shore, which had a station stop in Erie starting in November 1971. However, the poor condition of the track between Buffalo and Chicago, as well as the service's general lack of profitability, led to the Lake Shore's demise. Erie remained devoid of any passenger rail service until Amtrak reintroduced the former New York Central train, the Lake Shore Limited, on November 30, 1975.

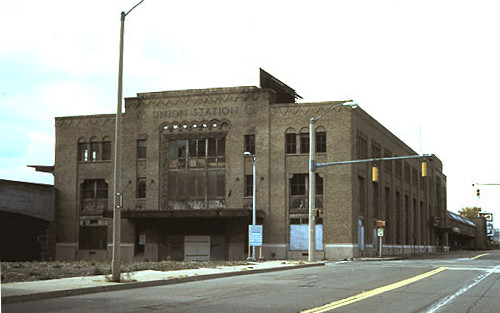
Union Station standing derelict in 1991

During that time, upkeep of Union Station became neglected by the railroads, and the station gradually deteriorated from its heyday. The presence of dirt, trash, and human waste were a normal occurrence at the station. At one point, in 1973, the Pennsylvania Department of Labor and Industry ordered Penn Central to close Union Station citing "sanitary reasons"; at the time, it was only used by the crews of its freight trains. In the winter, the station often became an "unsanctioned shelter" for the homeless, who burned the station's wooden doors for heat. The few passengers that did travel by train were often reluctant to use Amtrak's makeshift waiting room in the station rotunda, due to the unsettling sights and fear of being accosted. Penn Central persisted with freight service until it declared bankruptcy and became a part of Conrail on April 1, 1976. Conrail, in turn, was dismantled on June 6, 1998, and the former New York Central rail lines were transferred to CSX, and Norfolk Southern Railway gained control of the former Pennsylvania lines.

=== Renovation and restoration ===
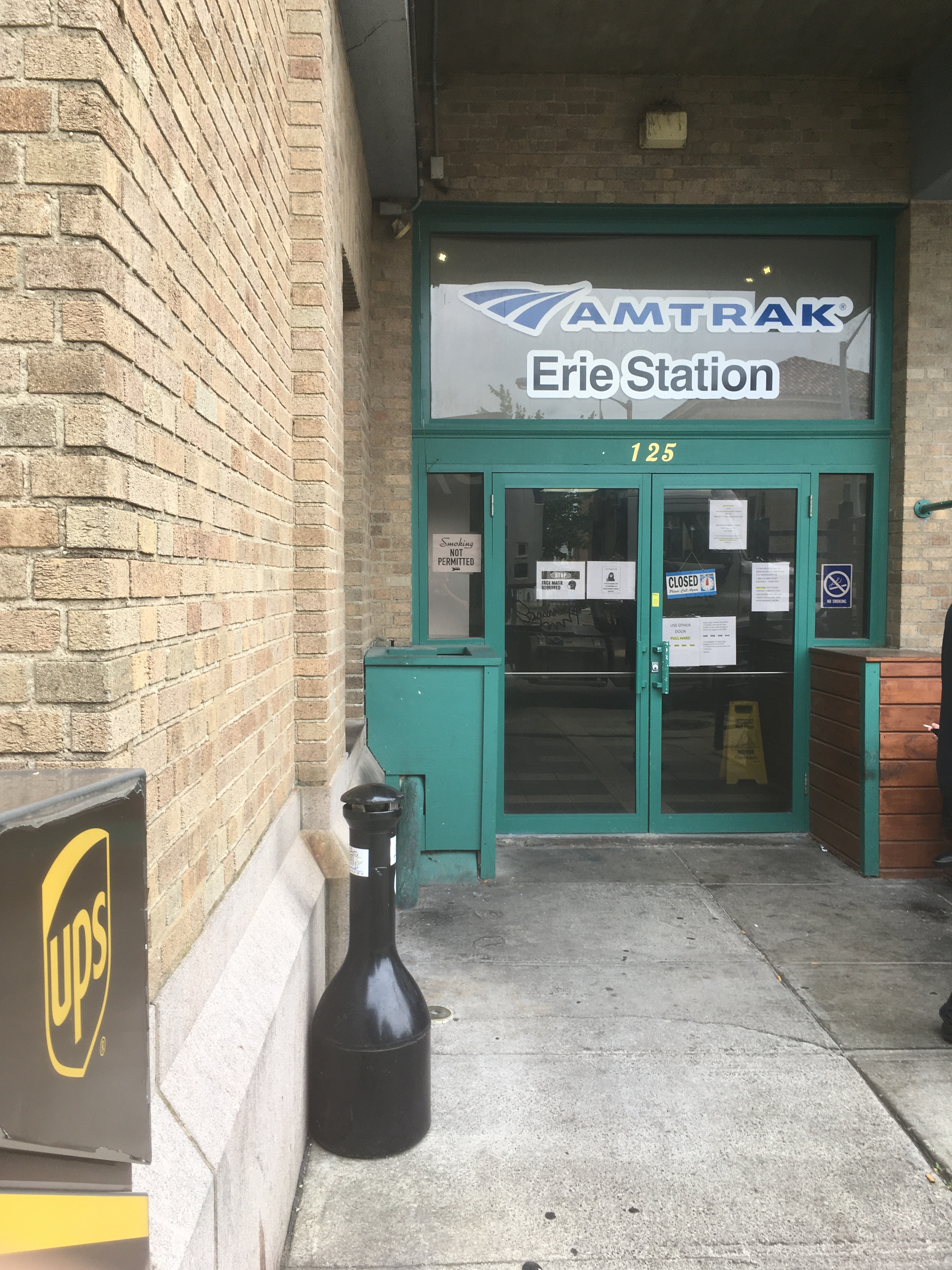
Amtrak station entrance

On October 30, 2003, Erie-based logistics and transportation firm Logistics Plus purchased Union Station for $1.5 million (equivalent to $2.63 million in 2025). The company renovated the station's third floor and part of the second floor for use as its corporate headquarters, thus restoring a landmark and revitalizing the surrounding neighborhood. The chief executive officer of Logistics Plus, Jim Berlin, observed that the building's transportation motif made the building ideal. "[T]hough Union Station will never be the center of transportation again," he said, "it can be a place from which transportation—global transportation—can be managed". The original proposed plan included revamping Union Station into an urban, mixed-use development with retail spaces, a pedestrian mall and a museum similar to Pittsburgh's Station Square. In May 2007, Logistics Plus lined the parapet of Union Station with 50 flags symbolizing the locations it does business in and the home countries of its employees.

Since the 1990s, Union Station has also been "an incubator of Erie's modern [beer] brewing" starting with the brewpub Hoppers, which operated in the station from 1994 to 1999. When Hoppers relocated and became a full production brewery under the name of Erie Brewing Company, Porters, a fine dining restaurant and beer bar, opened in its place. The Brewerie at Union Station took over the space, and opened in October 2006 after the closure of the restaurant earlier that year. During the run-up to the 2008 presidential election, Union Station was site of a "whistle-stop" by ABC's Good Morning America news team on a charter Amtrak train. Sam Champion, Chris Cuomo, Robin Roberts, and Diane Sawyer, the news anchors, interviewed local residents at the Brewerie about campaign issues. The Good Morning America stop lasted about 30 minutes, and the resulting television segment aired on September 18, 2008.

As part of the American Recovery and Reinvestment Act of 2009, the Federal Railroad Administration identified ten regions for potential development as high-speed rail corridors—Erie lies in a gap near three corridors: the Chicago Hub Network, the Empire Corridor, and the Keystone Corridor. The local passenger rail advocacy group, All Aboard Erie, proposed a feasibility study in 2014 for high-speed rail service to connect to the corridors at Cleveland and Buffalo. The group also sought to determine if rail service would be possible using the existing tracks and right of way between Erie, Youngstown and Pittsburgh.

== Services and facilities ==
=== Amtrak ===
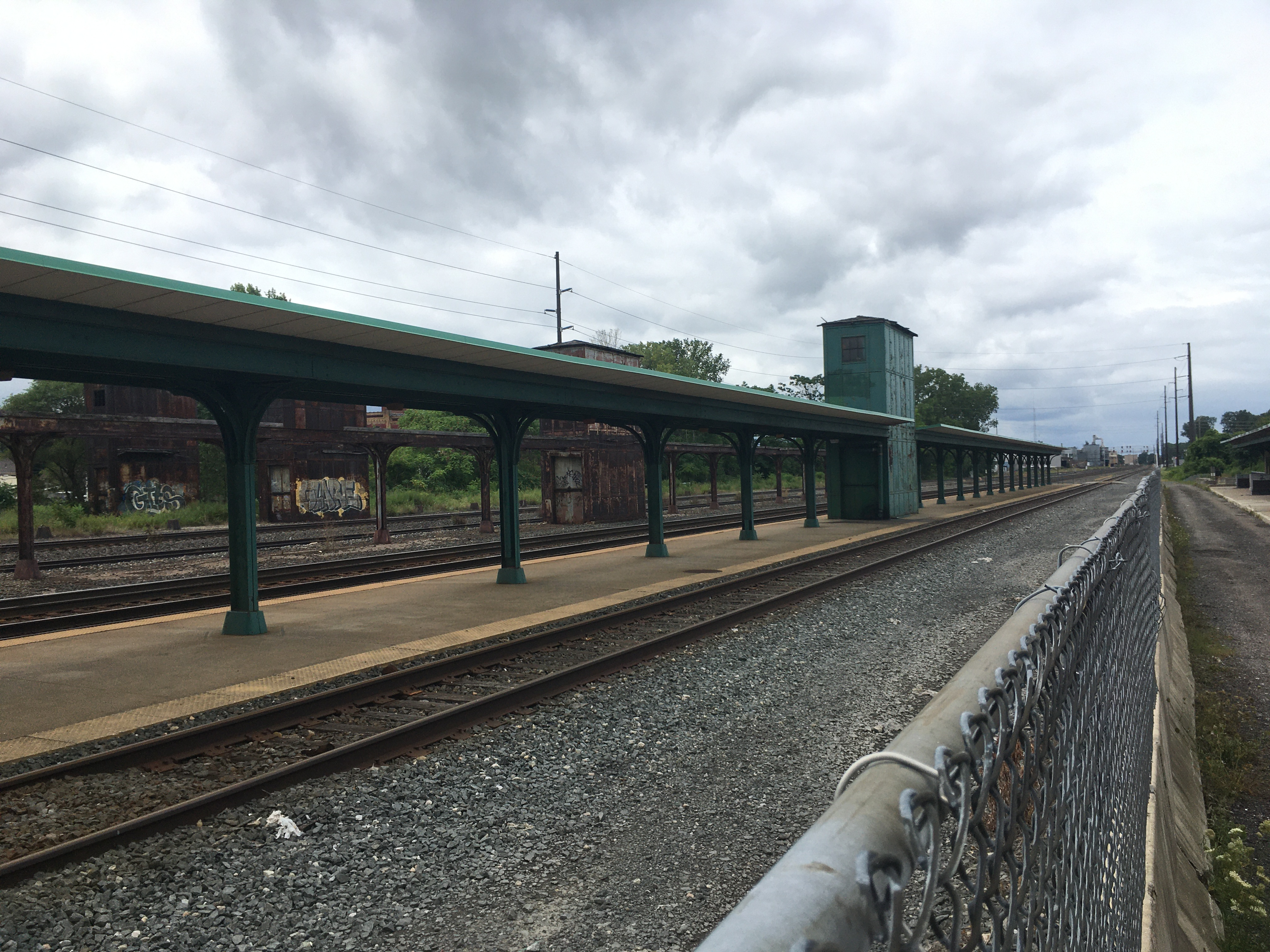
Amtrak platforms at Union Station in August 2020

Amtrak's Lake Shore Limited arrives at Union Station twice daily, westbound from New York Penn Station and Boston South Station, and eastbound from Chicago Union Station, with scheduled arrivals in the middle of the night and in the early morning, respectively, as of April 8, 2017. Union Station is on the Lake Shore Subdivision, the CSX Transportation main line from Erie to Buffalo, New York, at railroad milepost 86.9. It is 436 miles (702 km) east of Chicago, 523 miles (842 km) west of New York City, and 723 miles (1,164 km) from Boston. The next station west of Erie is Cleveland, and eastbound is Buffalo–Depew. The station was the 15th busiest in Pennsylvania during fiscal year 2025 with an annual ridership of 18,294 passengers, a increase of 1.4 percent from the previous year.

Service on the Lake Shore Limited consists of reserved coach and business class seating, and Viewliner sleeping accommodations. As the Erie station is not equipped with a ticket office, nor Amtrak's Quik-Trak ticket machines, all tickets from the station have to be pre-paid. The station is, however, equipped with a waiting room and public restrooms. The Erie Metropolitan Transit Authority's Route 20A, the downtown circulator, provides service between the station and downtown Erie. The bus only operates, however, at the scheduled arrival time of the eastbound Lake Shore Limited.

=== Commercial tenants ===
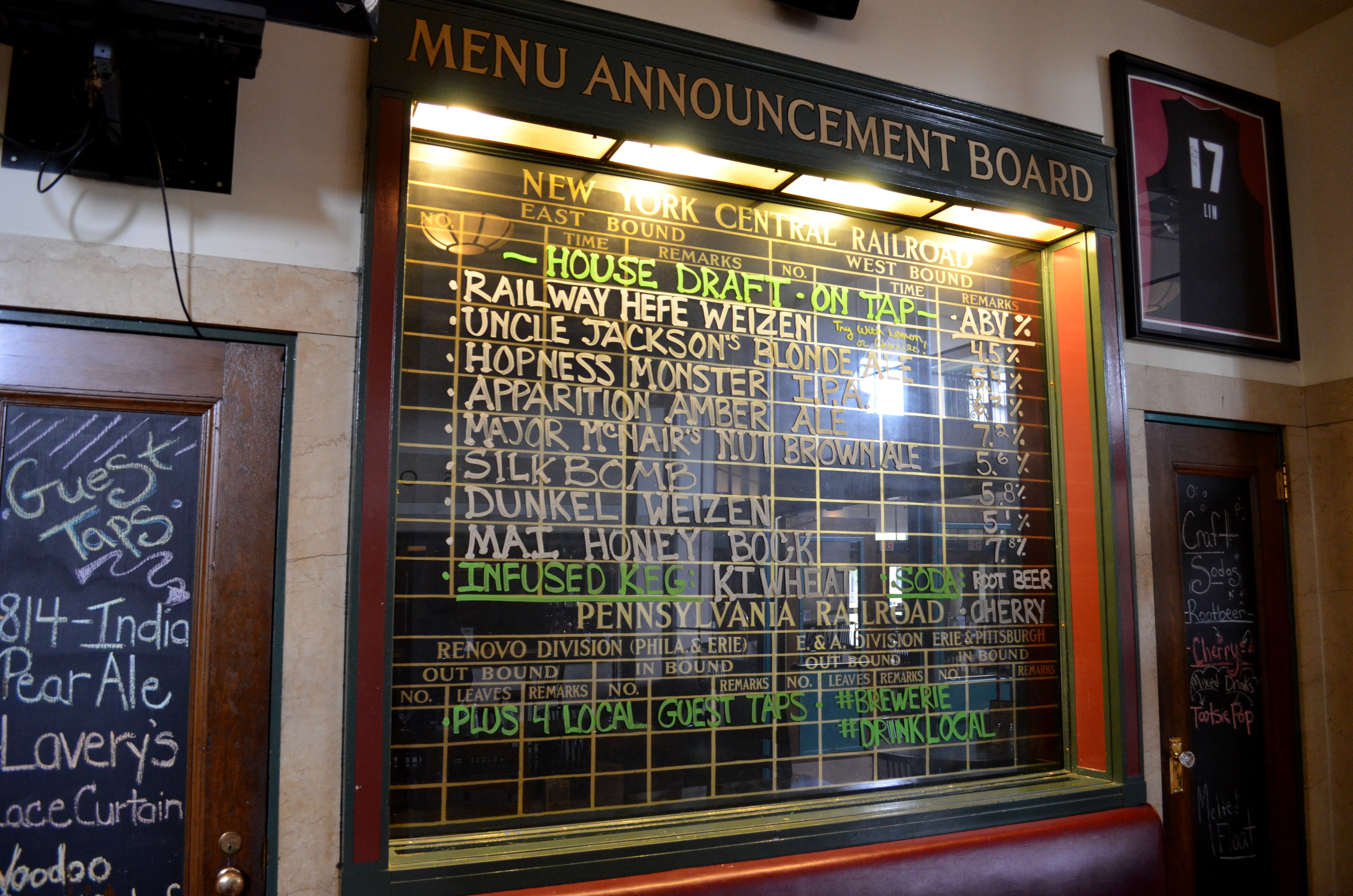
Railroad timetable board repurposed as a beer menu

Union Station serves as the corporate headquarters for Logistics Plus. It was formed in 1996 to manage domestic logistics for GE Transportation, the largest employer in Erie. The company's offices were relocated from Jamestown, New York to the station in 2004. Logistics Plus occupies the 16,000-square-foot (1,500 m^{2}) third floor and 5,000 square feet (500 m^{2}) of the second floor. The rest of the building is leased out to a variety of tenants including Amtrak, the Brewerie, a hookah lounge, a wine shop, a hair salon, a banquet hall, and an art studio.

The Brewerie at Union Station is a microbrewery and restaurant—officially categorized as a "brewpub" by the Brewers Association—that operates out of Union Station. The brewpub makes use of a portion of the station's ground floor and its octagonal rotunda. In 2013, the Brewerie produced approximately 500 barrels of beer (15,500 gal; 59,000 L) from its 3.5-barrel (109 gal; 410 L) Price-Schonstrom brewing system.

== See also ==
- List of Amtrak stations
- List of microbreweries
- Union station

== Sources ==
- Bates, Samuel P.; Brown, R. C.; Russell, N. W; Weakley, F. E; Whitman, Benjamin (1884). History of Erie County, Pennsylvania. Chicago: Warner and Beers. OCLC 8622308.
- Bliley, Charles A. (2001a) [First published 1982]. The Bliley Electric Company: The Early Years 1930–1955 (PDF). Erie, Pennsylvania: Bliley Electric.
- Bryson, Lew (2010). Pennsylvania Breweries (4th ed.). Mechanicsburg, Pennsylvania: Stackpole Books. ISBN 978-0-8117-3641-1.
- DeMarco, Tricia Wood (October–November 2013). "Erie's Treasures: Union Square, The Achievement Center and the Armory". Erie. Erie Regional Chamber and Growth Partnership: 10–11.
- "Erieite Offers Description Of 'Old Union Station' When It Was New $100,000 Depot Away Back In 1864". Erie Daily Times. December 3, 1927. pp. 11, 16.
- Federal Writers' Project (1938). Erie, A Guide to the City and County. Philadelphia: William Penn Association. OCLC 5429724.
- Fellheimer, Alfred T.; Wagner, Steward (December 3, 1927). "Interesting Review of the Station". Celebrating the Dedication of Erie's New Passenger Station. Erie Chamber of Commerce: 11, 14.
- Felong, Kathleen (January 31, 1988). "Union Station Pulls into Another Decade of Service". Erie Times-News. pp. 6K–8K.
- Guerriero, John (September 17, 2008a). "Here and Gone: ABC Team Makes Quick Visit to Erie". Erie Times-News. pp. 1A, 4A.
- Leonardi, Ron (March 1, 2011). "Tunnel into History: Network of Passageways Under Union Station and Griswold Plaza Leads to Erie's Past". Erie Times-News. pp. 1A, 8A.
- Miller, John (1909). A Twentieth Century History of Erie County, Pennsylvania. Vol. 1. Chicago: Lewis Publishing Co. OCLC 5511272.
- Nolen, John; Goodrich, E. P.; Long, Henry C.; Lane, F. Van Z. (1913). Greater Erie: Plans and Reports for Extension and Improvement of the City. Erie, Pennsylvania: Chamber of Commerce; Board of Trade. OCLC 4851681.
- Panepento, Peter (October 31, 2003). "Local Firm Buys Union Station". Erie Times-News. pp. 1A, 4A.
- Reed, John Elmer (1923). History of Erie County, Pennsylvania. Vol. 1. Topeka, Kansas: Historical Publishing Co. OCLC 2566729.
- "Logistics Plus: Gateway to the World" (PDF). Business Magazine. 19 (8). Erie, Pennsylvania: Manufacturers' Association of Northwest Pennsylvania: 10–12. August 2006.
- "Logistics Plus: Solutions Provider, Strategic Partner Growing in Services and Support". Business Magazine. 28 (1). Erie, Pennsylvania: Manufacturers and Business Association: 10–12. January 2015.
- New York Central Time Tables (PDF). New York Central Railroad. September 24, 1933.
- Pennsylvania Railroad (1902). Tour of His Royal Highness Prince Henry of Prussia in the United States of America: Under the Personally-Conducted System of the Pennsylvania Railroad. Philadelphia: Allen, Lane & Scott. OCLC 14699803.
- Springirth, Kenneth C. (2010). Northwestern Pennsylvania Railroads. Images of Rail. Charleston, South Carolina: Arcadia Publishing. ISBN 978-0-7385-7347-2.
- Stanford, Linda Oliphant (Fall 1985). "Railway Designs by Fellheimer and Wagner, New York to Cincinnati" (PDF). Queen City Heritage. Cincinnati Historical Society: 2–24. Archived from the original (PDF) on December 20, 2016.
- Thompson, Lisa (March 18, 2008). "Day Three: On the Factory Floor, Leona Justka Helped Win the War". Erie Times-News. Women of the Greatest Generation. pp. 1A, 4A.
