= Ashtabula station =

Railway depot in Ashtabula, Ohio, USA

Ashtabula
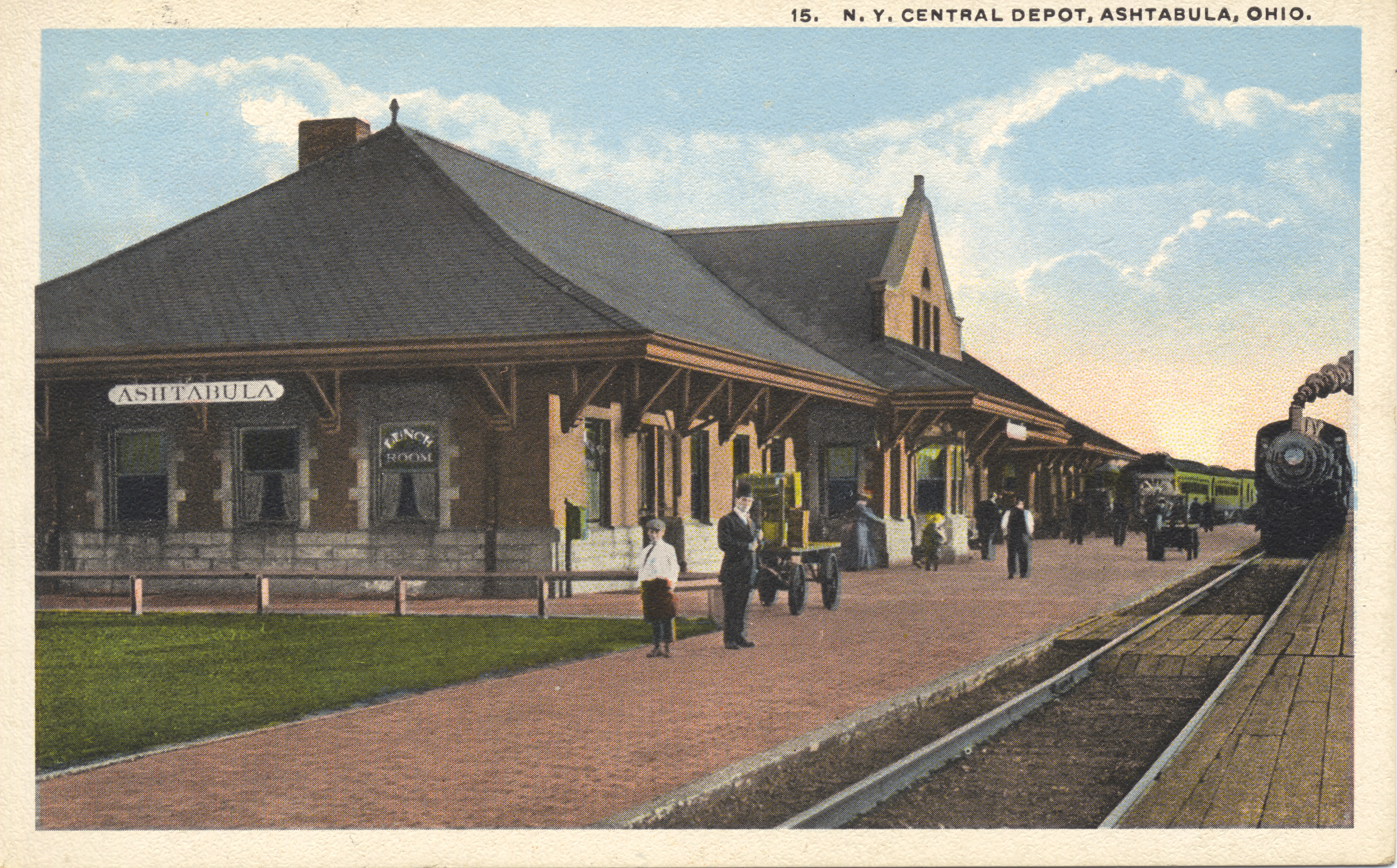
- Postcard showing the station circa 1910

General information
- Coordinates: 41°52′33″N 80°47′33″W
- Tracks: 2

History
- Opened: 1901
- Closed: 1971

Former services
Preceding station	New York Central Railroad	Following station
Saybrook toward Chicago	Main Line	Kingsville toward New York
Terminus	Youngstown Branch	Centre Street toward Youngstown
Terminus	Oil City Branch	Centre Street toward Oil City
Location

Ashtabula was a Lake Shore and Michigan Southern Railway depot in Ashtabula, Ohio. It was built in 1901 to replace an older depot on the same line. The depot was located on West Thirty-second Street. Along with the rest of the line, the station became part of the New York Central Railroad system in 1914. The station received commuter service from Cleveland Union Terminal until 1945.

As of 2012, the depot was used as a signal house for CSX.

== History ==
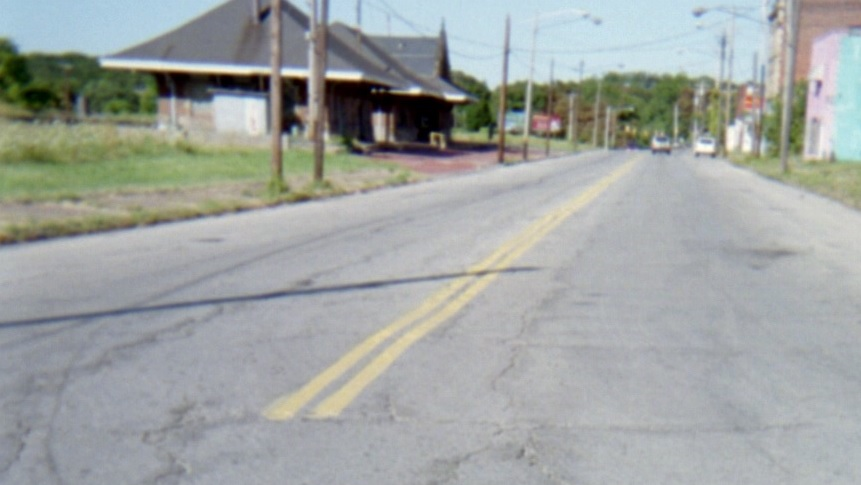
Station in 2008

Ashtabula station was within 1000 feet of the Ashtabula River railroad disaster in 1876.

CSX demolished the depot on May 31, 2018.
