= Erie Gauge War =

Conflict about railroad track gauge

- Date: December 7, 1853 – February 1, 1854
- Location: Pennsylvania, United States
- Also known as: Erie Railroad War

The Erie Gauge War (sometimes called the Erie Railroad War) was a conflict between the citizens of Erie, Pennsylvania, and two railroad companies over the standardization of the track gauge between Erie and the New York border. It started on December 7, 1853, and ended on February 1, 1854.

== Background ==
In 1849, the Erie and North East Railroad started laying track east from Erie to the New York–Pennsylvania border, 20 miles (32 km) away, at a gauge of 6 ft (1,829 mm). At the same time, the Franklin Canal Company was laying track west from Erie to the Ohio–Pennsylvania border and the Buffalo and State Line Railroad was laying track from Buffalo to the Pennsylvania–New York border. Both of these were at a gauge of 4 ft 10 in (1,473 mm) (Ohio gauge). On November 23, 1852, the first train left Erie for Ashtabula, Ohio, and on January 19, 1852, the first train from the New York state border arrived in Erie. A passenger traveling between Buffalo and Cleveland was forced to change trains twice: once in Erie and once at the Pennsylvania–New York border, because of the different gauges. The trains were timed to connect, but delays were not uncommon, resulting in missed connections. Many passengers found, unexpectedly, that they had to spend a night in Erie before continuing the following day.

The citizens of Erie benefited from being an "enforced stopping place," as they made good money from the transferring freight from one train to another and from passengers buying food at Erie's restaurants or street vendors (leading the conflict to sometimes be referred to, with scorn, as the "Peanut War," as Erie's peanut sellers would allegedly be the hardest hit by the lack of passengers). Passengers stayed in Erie hotels. The owners of the Buffalo and State Line Railroad were able to acquire 2/3 of the Erie and North East's stock, and on November 16, 1853, they announced that they would re-lay the 6 ft (1,829 mm) track between Erie and the New York border using the narrower Ohio gauge, but four months earlier, to try to prevent the change, Erie's city council had enacted ordinances barring the new track from crossing city streets. On November 26, 1853, the council was reconvened when railroad ties were found being laid in preparation for the gauge change. The council passed an ordinance allowing the mayor to call out the city's police to take down any of the railroad track that crossed the city's streets, "in order to preserve the present railroad gauge."

== Conflict ==
On December 7, 1853, after swearing in 150 "special police constables", Mayor Alfred King led the police to the railroad bridge crossing State and French streets and, where engineers had marked the edges of the streets on the bridges, had sections of the bridges cut out. That evening, 7 miles (11 km) away, the citizens of the town of Harborcreek, decided to pass their own ordinances, then proceeded to tear up tracks along the highway. Three days later, tracks of the new gauge were completed up to the city limits and that night the people of Harborcreek tore out the tracks again, knocked down a bridge, and even ploughed up a level crossing. An injunction was obtained by the railroad from the United States Circuit Court in Pittsburgh, and a United States Marshal was dispatched to Harborcreek. Upon arriving in Harborcreek, the marshal served it to one of the officials of Harborcreek and pointed out the seal of the United States. The official promptly threw it on the ground, stomped it with his heel, and declared the heel mark "the seal of Harborcreek."

The most serious incident occurred on December 27, 1853, when a train of railroad officials and workers on the new line was stopped outside of Harborcreek by a crowd of people ripping up the tracks. An official shot at one of the men in the crowd and knocked him unconscious. The crowd, who believed the man to be dead, chased the official back on to his train. After two or three members of the crowd forced their way on to the train, the train reversed and "headed at full speed for the state line". Once across the border, the train stopped, and stowaways from Harborcreek were sent back over the border into Pennsylvania.

Finally, on February 1, 1854, the railroad ran a train through Erie without change. But civil disturbances continued for years. Townspeople were assaulted, the local newspaper's building was torn down and the ruins burnt, and the Presbyterian church split in two. The matter was so contentious that discussing it remained taboo for years afterwards.

== Reactions ==
Pennsylvania Governor William Bigler sympathized with Erie saying, "Pennsylvania holds the key to this important link of connexion between the East and the West, and I most unhesitatingly say, that where no principle of amity or commerce is to be violated, it is the right and the duty of the State to turn her natural advantages to the promotion of the views and welfare of her own people."

Although the governor and state of Pennsylvania agreed with Erie's objectives, people in other states criticized Pennsylvania for its "selfishness". The United States representative from Ohio, Edward Wade, suggested that Pennsylvania's nickname be changed to the "Shylock State" because it "demanded a 'pound of flesh' from all who passed its borders".

On December 26, 1853, Horace Greeley, editor of the New York Tribune, had to travel through Erie on his way to Chicago and had to travel from Harborcreek to Erie in an open sleigh "through a cutting storm of wind, snow, and sleet". Most people had to walk the 7-mile (11 km) gap left by the Rippers, even in the dead of winter "with icy winds sweeping across Lake Erie...Many had feet, hands and faces frostbitten. One man was frozen to death....Embittered tourists stumbled through the snow afoot, dragging their luggage with them whenever it was humanly possible rather than buy anything in Erie." Greeley had hoped to be able to give a lecture in Adrian, Michigan, that same day "but that could not now be, for the Kingdom of Erie forbade it".

== Resolution ==
In January 1854, with the repeal of the Missouri Compromise by the Kansas–Nebraska Act, the Erie Gauge War stopped attracting attention.

On January 28, the Pennsylvania General Assembly passed legislation maintaining "the break at Erie" and repealing the charter for the Franklin Canal Company. Governor Bigler appointed future governor William F. Packer to state superintendent and personally took control of the Franklin Canal Company. All Erie & North East bridges and track were rebuilt by February 1, and E&NE trains were running normally again.

Although the Gauge War largely ended in February 1854, disruptions continued irregularly into 1856. In mid-January 1855, a mob in Harborcreek tore up Erie & North East track, and destroyed two bridges. The state sent in law enforcement, and the property damage ended immediately. The bridges were swiftly rebuilt days later, and the track relaid.

== Bibliography ==
- Davis, Earle (January 1933). "When Erie Fought the Railroad". Railroad Stories Magazine.
- Egle, William Henry (1902). Pennsylvania Archives. Volume II, Series 4. Harrisburg, Pa.: State of Pennsylvania.
- Kent, Donald H. (October 1948). "The Erie War of the Gauges". Pennsylvania History: 253–275.
- Reed, John Elmer (1925). History of Erie County. Volume 1. Topeka, Kan.: Historical Publishing Company.
- Rhodes, James Ford (1900). History of the United States From the Compromise of 1850. Volume 3. New York: Harper & Brothers.
- Rosenberger, Homer Tope (1975). The Philadelphia and Erie Railroad: Its Place in American Economic History. Potomac, Md.: Fox Hills Press. ISBN 9780914932024.
- Wellejus, Edward T. (2004). Historic Erie County: An Illustrated History. San Antonio, Tex.: Historical Publishing Network. ISBN 9781883658441.
