= Conneaut station =

Train station in Ohio, US

Conneaut
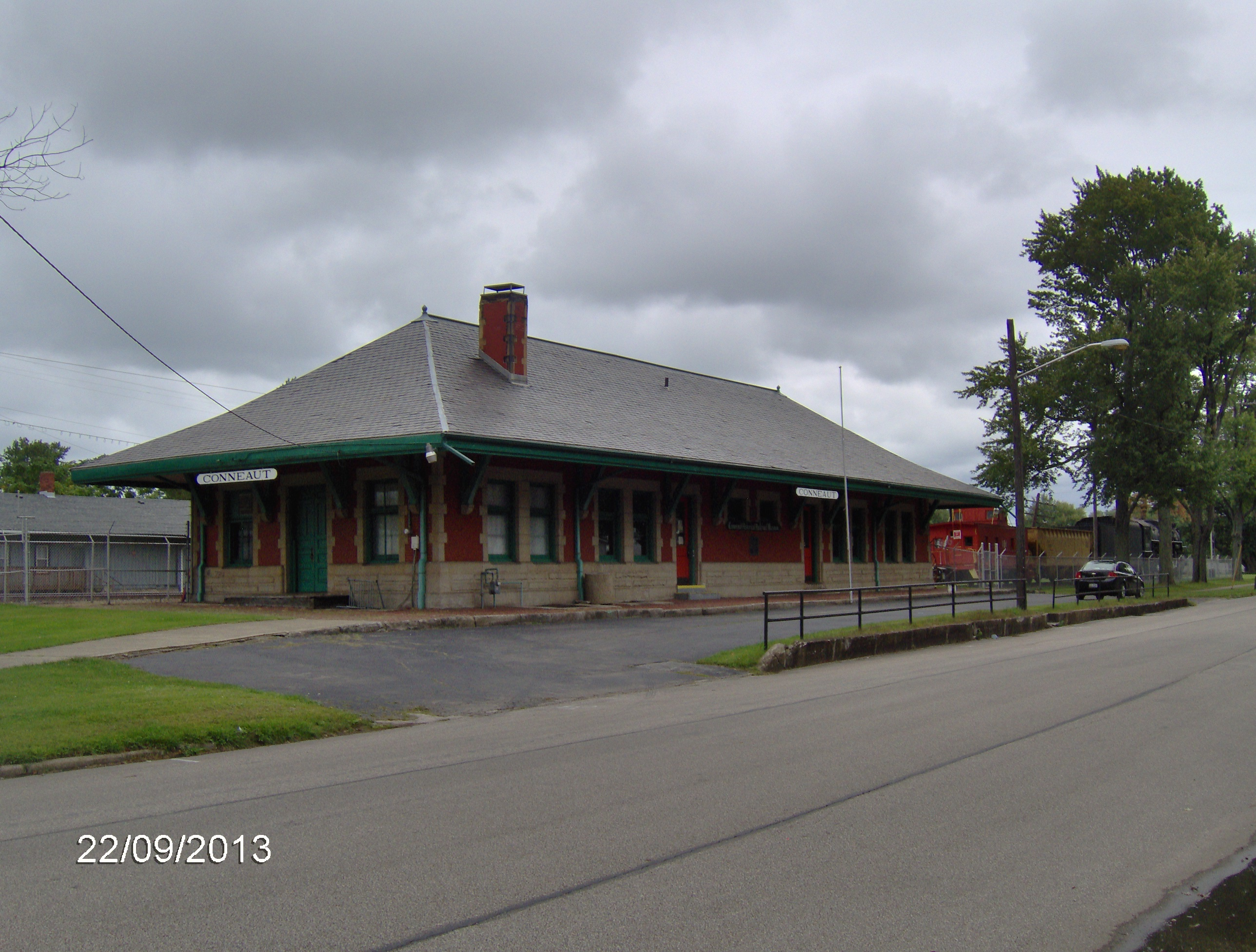
- The station as seen from Depot Street.

General information
- Location: 342 Depot Street; Conneaut, Ohio
- Coordinates: 41°56′59″N 80°33′33″W
- Tracks: 2

History
- Closed: 1962

Former services
Preceding station	New York Central Railroad	Following station
Kingsville toward Chicago	Main Line	Springfield, PA toward New York
- Lake Shore And Michigan Southern Passenger Depot
- U.S. National Register of Historic Places
- Location within Ohio Location within the United States
- Location: Depot Street Conneaut, Ohio
- Coordinates: 41°56′59″N 80°33′33″W
- Area: less than one acre
- Built: 1900
- NRHP reference No.: 75001314
- Added to NRHP: March 27, 1975
Location

Conneaut is a former New York Central (originally a Lake Shore and Michigan Southern) train station in the U.S. town of Conneaut, Ohio. It was built in 1900 by the Lake Shore and Michigan Southern as a replacement for an older wooden depot, then acquired by the New York Central Railroad in 1914, along with the rest of the LS&MS. The passenger depot building has housed the Conneaut Historical Railroad Museum since 1964, and has a display track with the Nickel Plate Road #755 Berkshire steam engine. The station has been registered as the Lake Shore And Michigan Southern Passenger Depot on the National Register of Historic Places since March 27, 1975. The freight house connected to the station is operated by the Conneaut Area Historical Society.

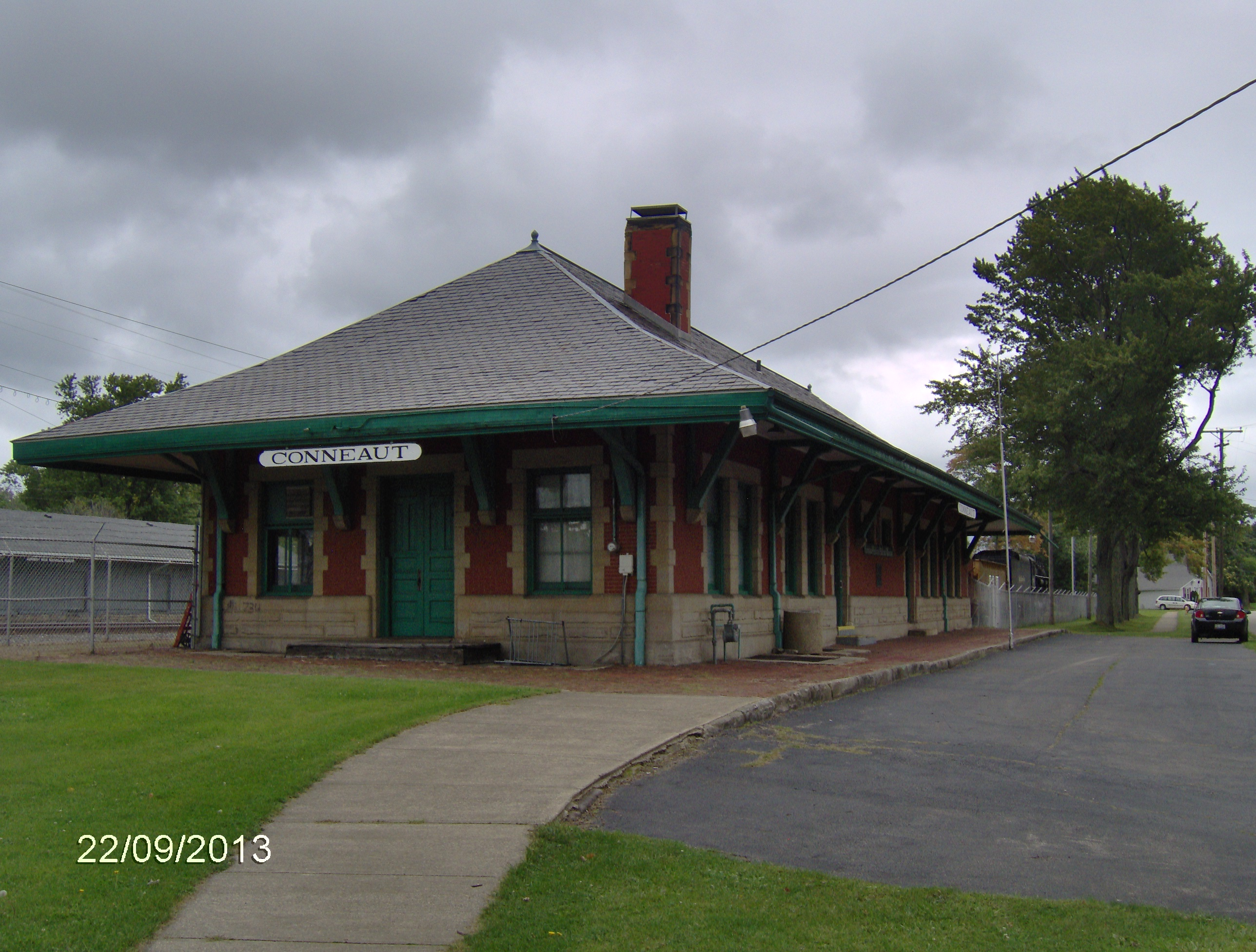
Traditional station sign.

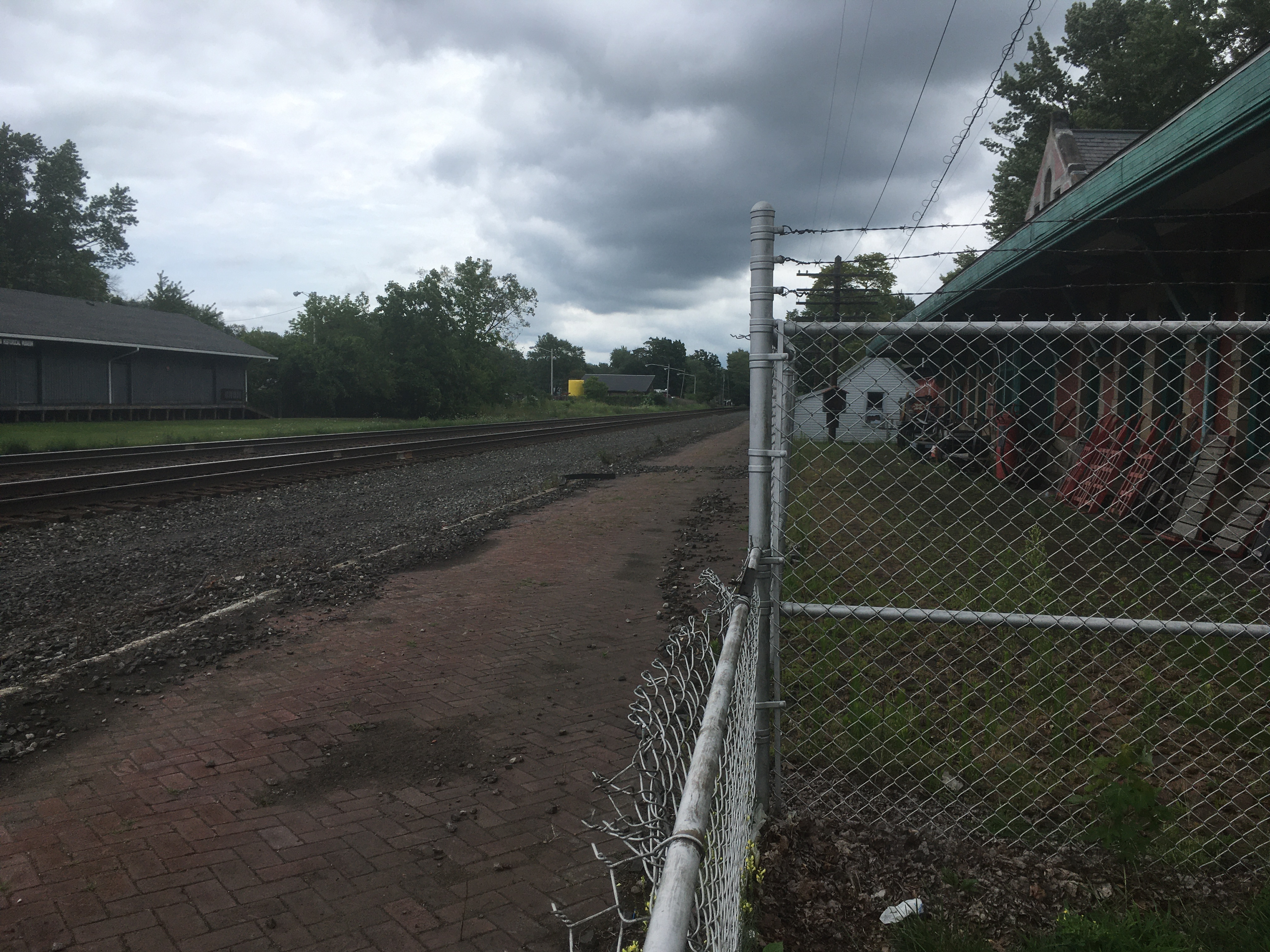
Station platform

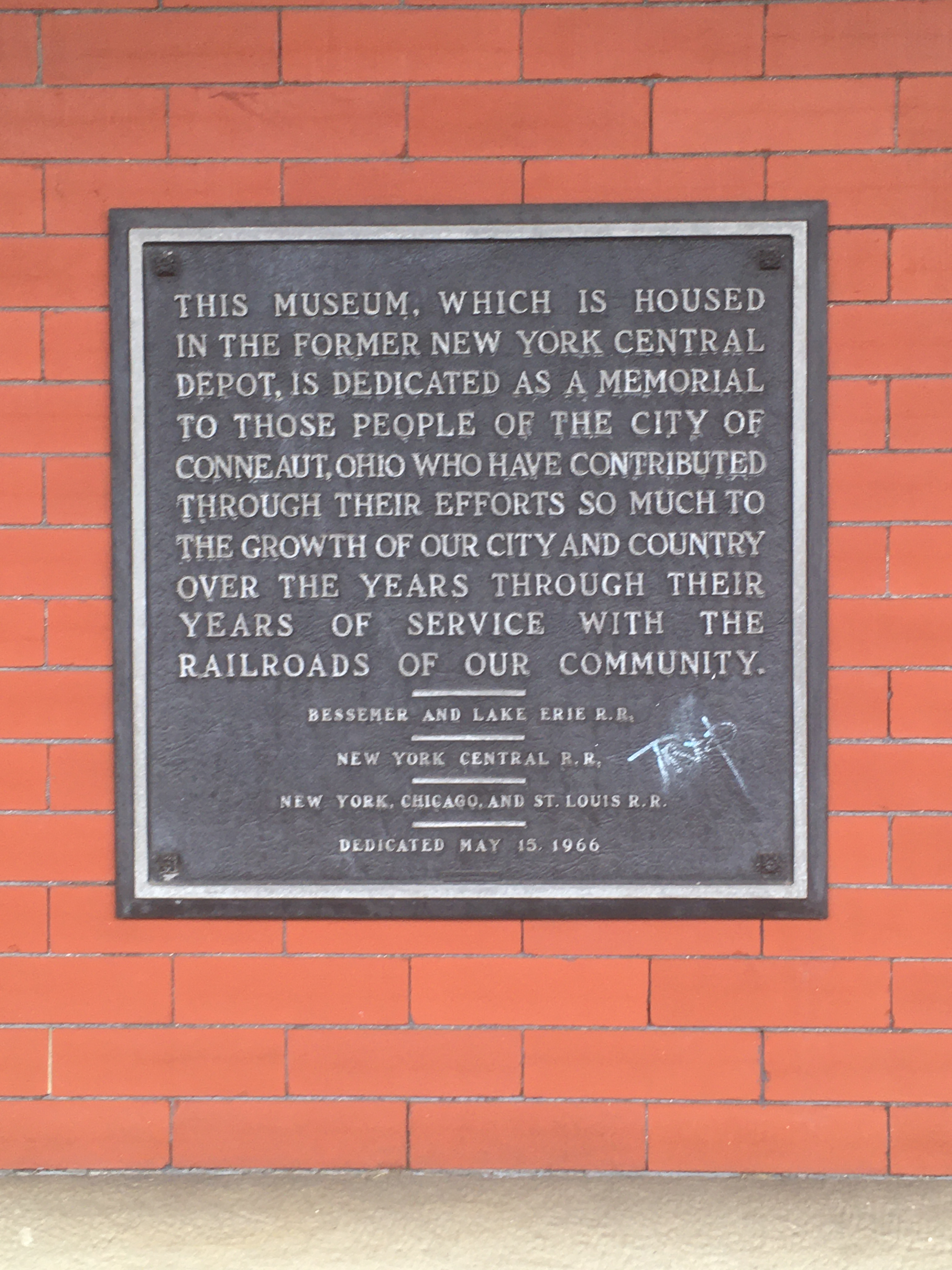
Museum plaque

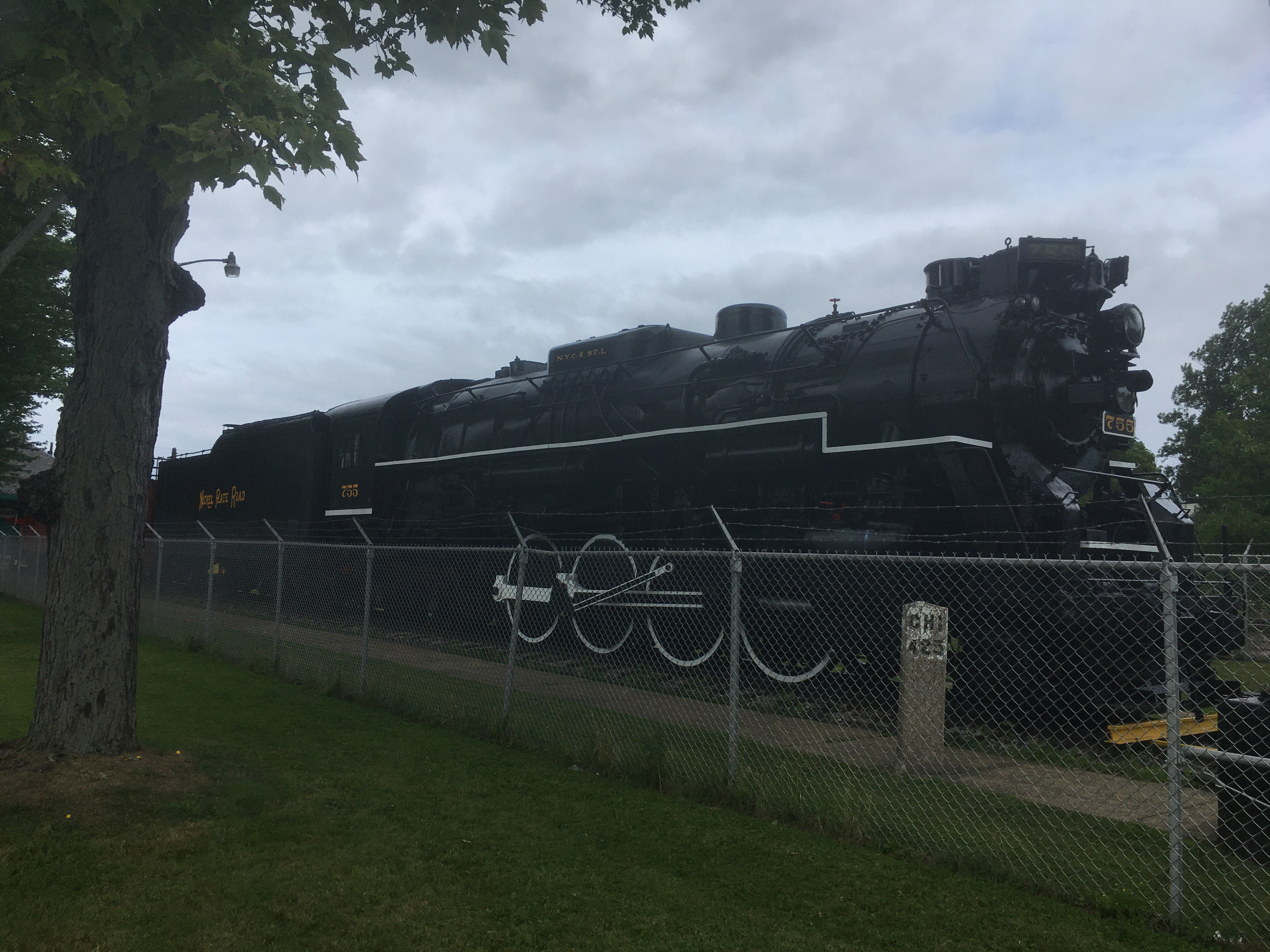
NKP 755

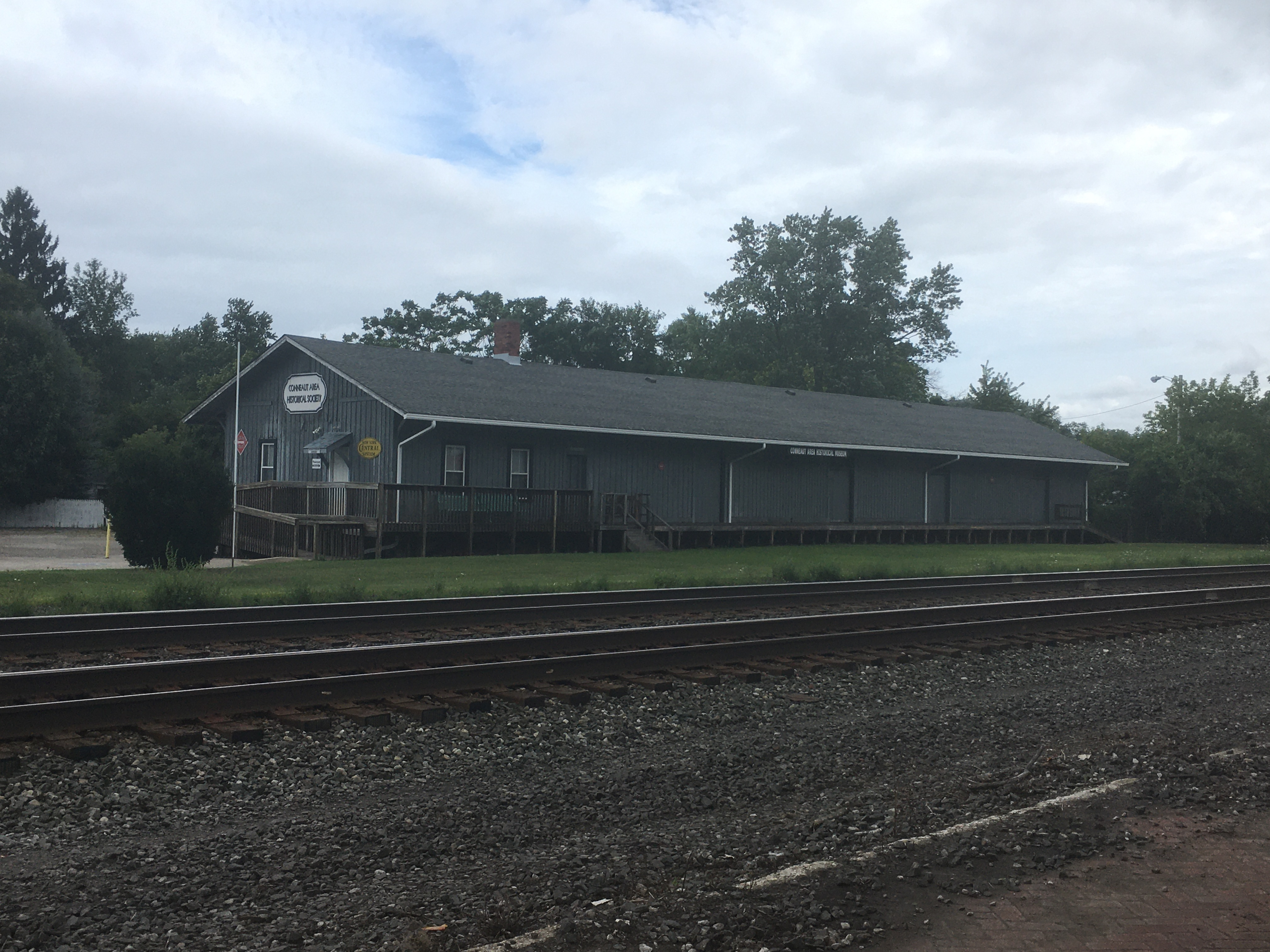
Adjacent freight depot

== See also ==
- Ashtabula River railroad disaster
