= Lake Shore and Michigan Southern Railway =

Railway in the United States

- The Lake Shore and Michigan Southern Railway system as of 1914

Overview
- Locale: Buffalo, NY to Chicago, IL
- Dates of operation: 1869–1914
- Successor: New York Central Railroad

Technical
- Track gauge: 4 ft 8 1/2 in (1,435 mm) standard gauge
- Previous gauge: 6 ft (1,829 mm)

The Lake Shore and Michigan Southern Railway, established in 1869, and sometimes referred to as the Lake Shore, was later became a major part of the New York Central Railroad's Water Level Route from Buffalo, New York, to Chicago, Illinois, primarily along the south shore of Lake Erie (in New York, Pennsylvania and Ohio) and across northern Indiana. The line remains a major rail transportation corridor used by Amtrak passenger trains and several freight railroads; in 1998, its ownership was split at Cleveland, Ohio, between CSX Transportation to the east and Norfolk Southern Railway in the west.

== History ==
=== Early history: 1835–1869 ===
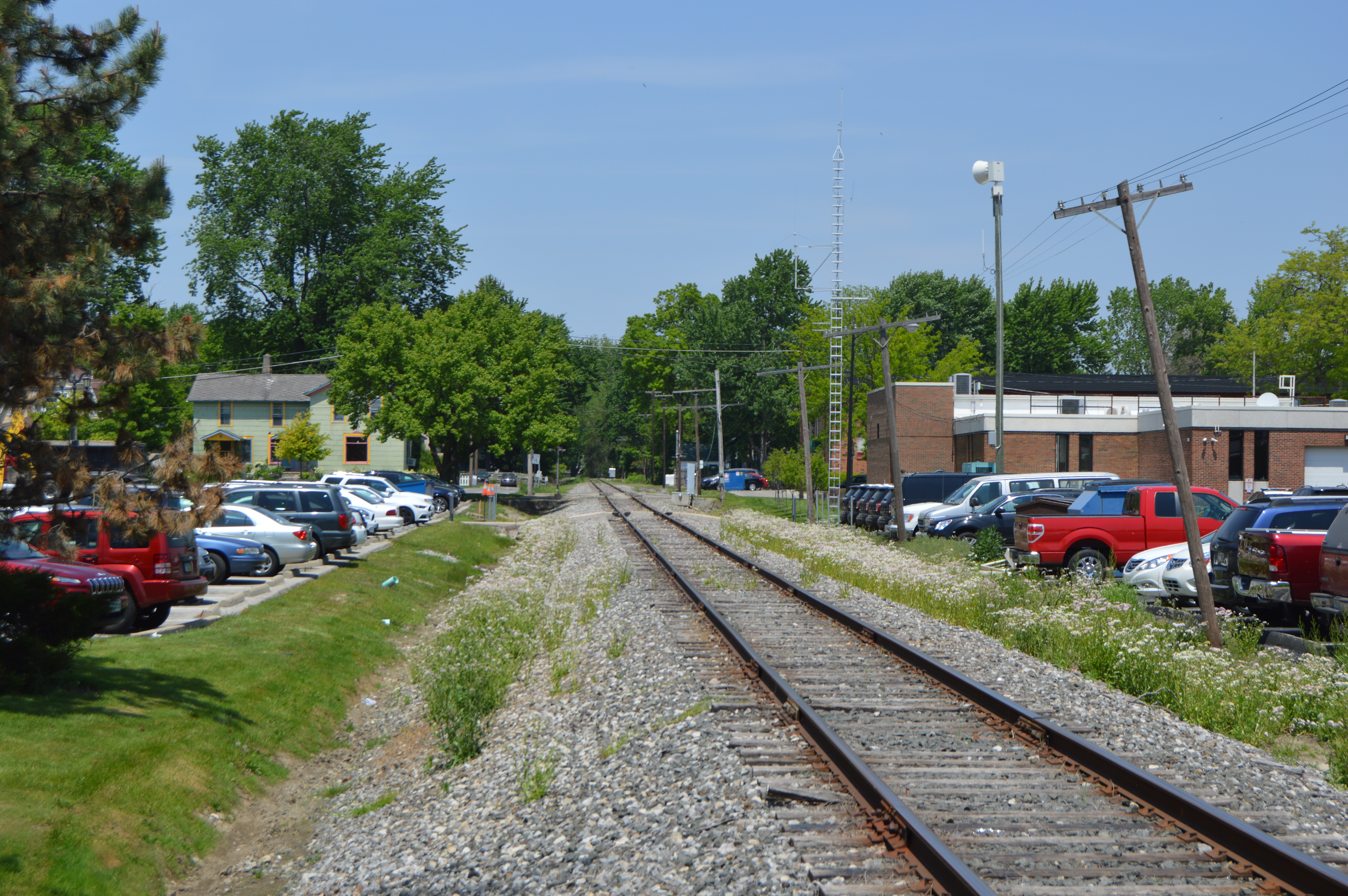
Part of the original route, now in Sylvania, Ohio

==== Toledo to Chicago ====
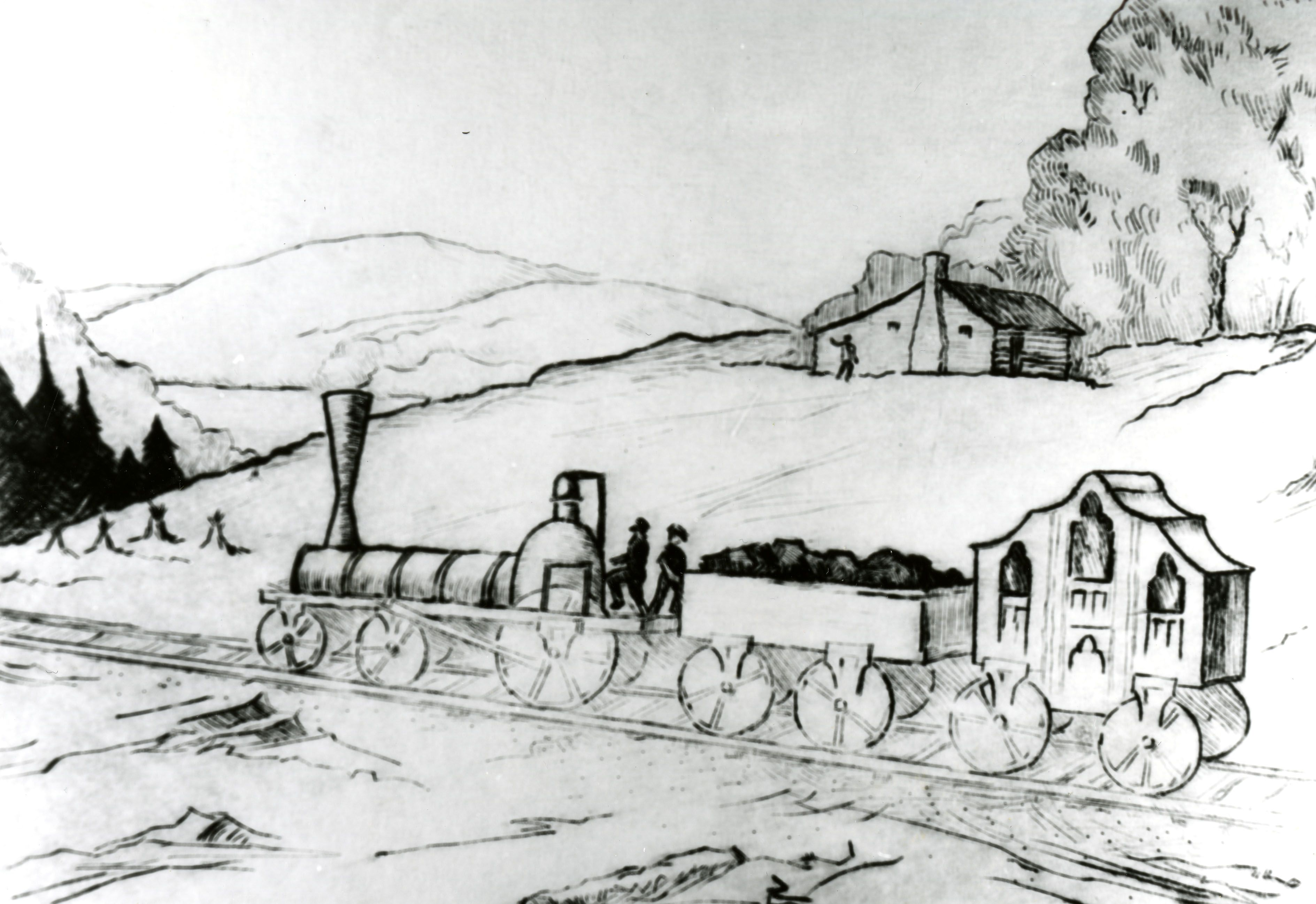
Drawing of the Erie and Kalamazoo Railroad

On April 22, 1833, the Erie and Kalamazoo Railroad was chartered in the Territory of Michigan, to run from the former Port Lawrence, Michigan, now Toledo, Ohio, near Lake Erie, northwest to Adrian, Michigan, on the River Raisin. The Toledo War soon gave about one-third of the route to the state of Ohio. Horse-drawn trains began operating on November 2, 1836; the horses were replaced by a newly arrived steam locomotive, Adrian No. 1, in August 1837.

The Buffalo and Mississippi Railroad was chartered in Indiana on February 6, 1835, to run from Buffalo, New York, to the Mississippi River. The name was changed on February 6, 1837, to the Northern Indiana Railroad, which would run from the eastern border of Indiana, west to Michigan City, Indiana, on Lake Michigan. Some grading between Michigan City, and La Porte, Indiana, was done in 1838, but money ran out.

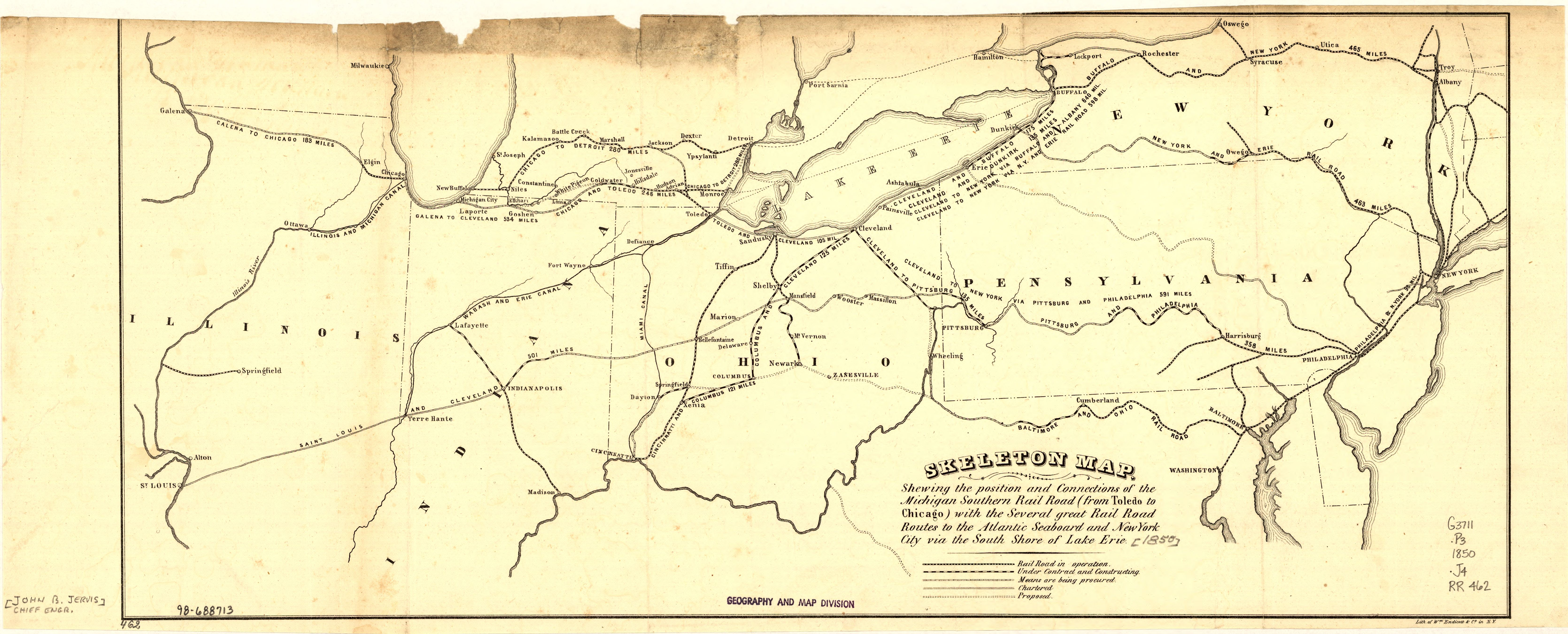
1850 map of the Michigan Southern Rail Road with connections

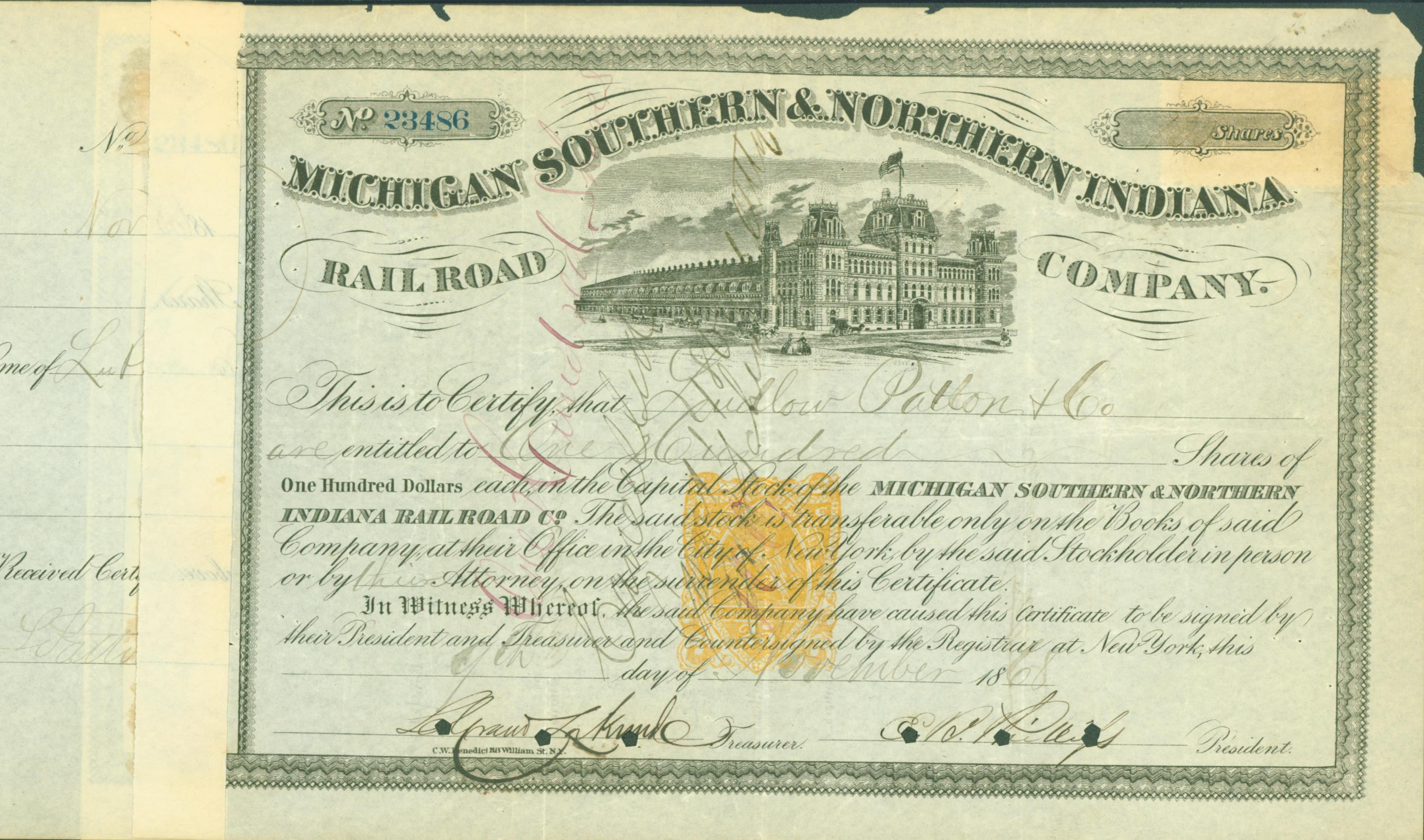
Share of the Michigan Southern & Northern Indiana Railroad Company, issued 10 November 1868

Around 1838, the state of Michigan started to build the Southern Railroad, running from Monroe, Michigan, on Lake Erie, west to New Buffalo, Michigan, on Lake Michigan. The first section, from Monroe, west to Petersburg, Michigan, opened in 1839. Extensions opened in 1840, to Adrian, and 1843, to Hillsdale, Michigan. On May 9, 1846, the partially completed line was sold to the Michigan Southern Rail Road, which changed the planned western terminal to Chicago, using the charter of the Northern Indiana Railroad. The grading that had been done was not used, as the grade was too steep, and instead the original Buffalo and Mississippi Railroad charter was used west of La Porte. The Michigan Southern leased the Erie and Kalamazoo on August 1, 1849, giving it a branch to Toledo, and a connection to planned railroads to the east.

Due to lobbying by the Michigan Central Railroad, a competitor of the Michigan Southern, the latter's charter prevented it from going within two miles (3.2 km) of the Indiana state line east of Constantine, Michigan. However, the most practical route went closer than two miles, west of White Pigeon, Michigan. To allow for this, Judge Stanfield, of South Bend, Indiana, bought the right-of-way from White Pigeon to the state line, and leased it to the railroad company for about 10 years, until the charter was modified to allow the company to own it.

The Northern Indiana and Chicago Railroad was chartered on November 30, 1850. Its initial tracks, from the Michigan Southern at the state line running west-southwest to Elkhart, Indiana, then west through Osceola, Indiana, and Mishawaka, Indiana, to South Bend, opened on October 4, 1851. The full line west to Chicago, opened on February 20, 1852, (running to the predecessor of Englewood Union Station, together with the Chicago and Rock Island Railroad). A more direct line was soon planned from Elkhart, east to Toledo, and the Northern Indiana Railroad was chartered in Ohio, on March 3, 1851. On July 8, 1853, the Ohio and Indiana companies merged, and on February 7, 1855, the Northern Indiana and Chicago Railroad and the Buffalo and Mississippi Railroad were merged into the Northern Indiana Railroad. On April 25, 1855, that company in turn merged with the Michigan Southern Rail Road to form the Michigan Southern and Northern Indiana Railroad. In 1858, the new alignment (Northern Indiana Air Line) from Elkhart, east to Air Line Junction, in Toledo, was completed. The company now owned a main line from Chicago to Toledo, with an alternate route through southern Michigan, east of Elkhart, and a branch off that alternate to Monroe. Also included was the Detroit, Monroe and Toledo Railroad, leased July 1, 1856, and providing a branch from Toledo, past Monroe, to Detroit, Michigan.

==== Erie to Cleveland ====
The Franklin Canal Company was chartered on May 21, 1844, and built a railroad from Erie, Pennsylvania, southwest to the Ohio border. The Cleveland, Painesville and Ashtabula Railroad was incorporated February 18, 1848, to build northeast from Cleveland, to join the Canal Company's railroad at the state line. The first portion from Cleveland to Painesville opened on November 20, 1851. The first trains to Ashtabula ran on June 16, 1852. The first train between Ashtabula and Erie ran on November 23, 1852. The Cleveland, Painesville and Ashtabula bought the Franklin Canal Company on June 20, 1854.

==== Buffalo to Erie ====
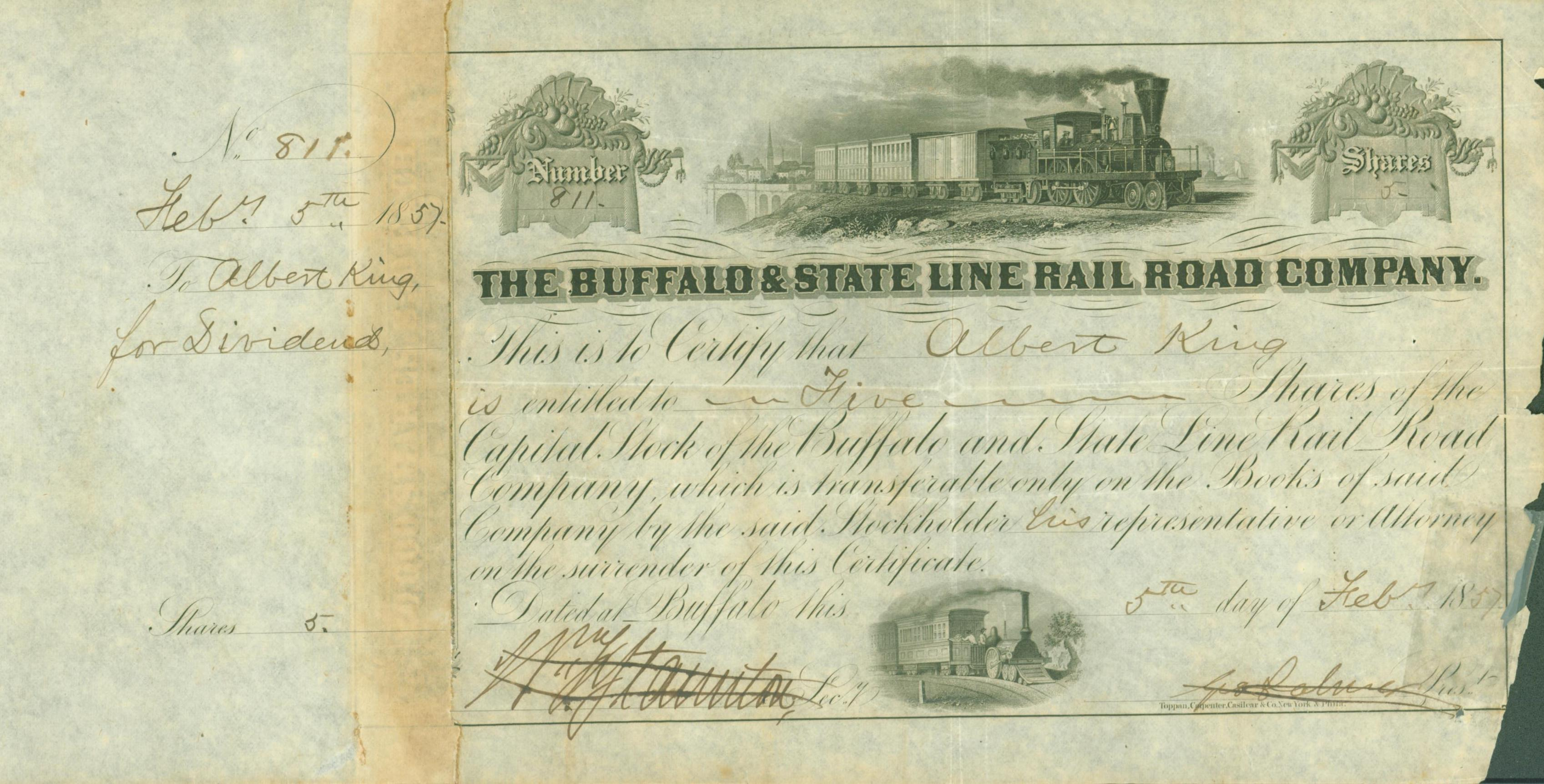
Share of the Buffalo and State Line Rail Road Company, issued 5 February 1857

The Buffalo and State Line Railroad was incorporated October 13, 1849, and opened January 1, 1852, from Dunkirk, New York, west to Pennsylvania. The rest of the line from Dunkirk to Buffalo, opened on February 17, 1852. The Erie and North East Railroad was chartered April 12, 1842, to build the part from the state line west to Erie, and opened on January 19, 1852. On November 16, 1853, an agreement was made between the two railroads, which had been built at 6 ft (1,829 mm) broad gauge, to relay the rails at 4 ft 8 1/2 in (1,435 mm) standard gauge to match the Franklin Canal Company's railroad (see below) on the other side of Erie, and for the Buffalo and State Line to operate the Erie and Northeast. This would result in through passengers no longer having to change trains at Erie, and on December 7, 1853, the Erie Gauge War began between the railroads and the townspeople. On February 1, 1854, the relaying was finished and the first train passed through Erie. On May 15, 1867, the two companies between Buffalo and Erie merged to form the Buffalo and Erie Railroad.

==== Cleveland to Toledo ====
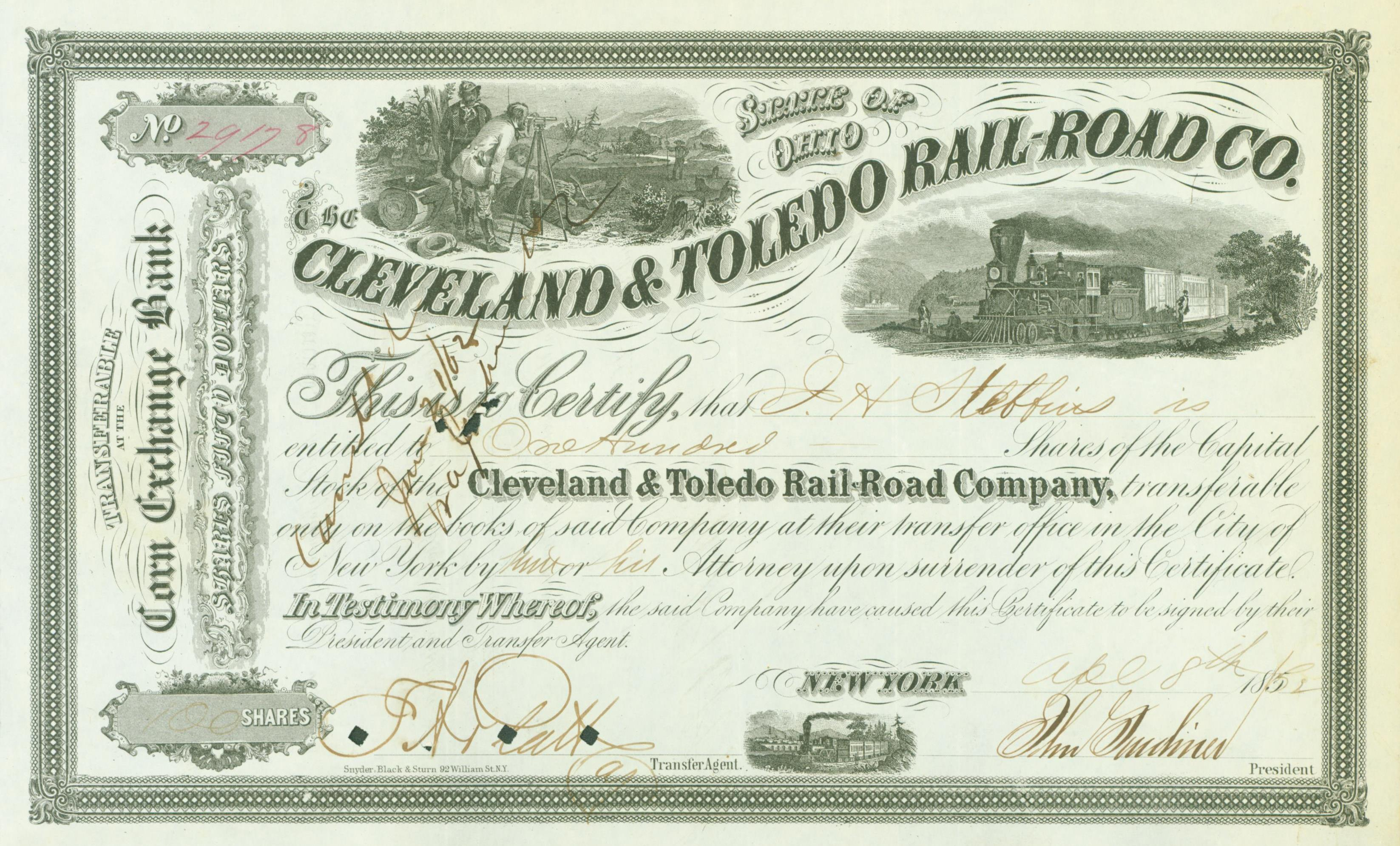
Share of the Cleveland & Toledo Rail-Road Company, issued 8 April 1862

The Junction Railroad was chartered March 2, 1846, to build from Cleveland, west to Toledo. The Toledo, Norwalk and Cleveland Railroad was chartered March 7, 1850, to build from Toledo, east to Grafton, Ohio, on the Cleveland, Columbus and Cincinnati Railroad. The latter company opened on December 20, 1852, finally forming a continuous Buffalo-Chicago line. On September 1, 1853, the two companies merged to form the Cleveland and Toledo Railroad, with the Junction Railroad becoming the Northern Division and the Toledo, Norwalk and Cleveland, the Southern Division. The Northern Division opened from Cleveland, west to Sandusky, Ohio, on October 24, 1853, and the rest of the way to Toledo, on April 24, 1855. The Northern Division was abandoned west of Sandusky, due to lack of business, but the track was relaid in 1872, merging with the Southern Division, at Millbury, Ohio, east of Toledo. In 1866, the Southern Division, east of Oberlin, Ohio, was abandoned and a new line was built to Elyria, Ohio, on the Northern Division, ending the use of the Cleveland, Columbus and Cincinnati Railroad.

==== Consolidations ====
In October 1867, the Cleveland, Painesville and Ashtabula Railroad leased the Cleveland and Toledo Railroad. The CP&A changed its name to the Lake Shore Railway on March 31, 1868, and on February 11, 1869, the Lake Shore absorbed the Cleveland and Toledo. On April 6, the Michigan Southern and Northern Indiana Railroad and Lake Shore merged to form the Lake Shore and Michigan Southern Railway, which absorbed the Buffalo and Erie Railroad on June 22, giving one company the whole route from Buffalo to Chicago. The LS&MS name was in use as a nickname for the four component railroads as early as 1859. The main route passed through Dunkirk; Erie; Ashtabula, Ohio; Cleveland; Toledo; Waterloo, Indiana; and South Bend. An alternate route, the Sandusky Division, in Ohio, ran north of the main line between Elyria, and Millbury, Ohio, not all track was laid until 1872. From Toledo to Elkhart, the Old Road ran to the north, through southern Michigan, and the through route was called the Air Line Division or Northern Indiana Air Line. Along with various branches that had been acquired (see below), the Monroe Branch ran east from Adrian, to Monroe, where it intersected the leased Detroit, Monroe and Toledo Railroad. At some point the original line to Toledo was abandoned west of the branch to Jackson, Michigan, the Palmyra and Jacksonburgh Railroad, with the new connection at Lenawee Junction, the crossing between that branch and the line to Monroe.

The railroad established its first significant repair shop in 1851 along Mason Street in Elkhart, Indiana. These shops were occasionally expanded and upgraded in the 1800s and early 1900s until employment reached about 1,500. A second shop site was established in 1874 in Collinwood on the northeast side of Cleveland, Ohio. In 1901, the railroad bought a new property in Collinwood for $2 million to build a much larger repair center that by the 1920s employed more than 2,000 people. In 1913, a freight car repair shop was established in Ashtabula, Ohio, to maintain the large roster of ore and coal cars operating at the nearby port. In 1952, as the railroad was converting its motive power from steam to diesel, the repair shops were consolidated at Collinwood.

=== Lake Shore and Michigan Southern Railway: 1869–1914 ===
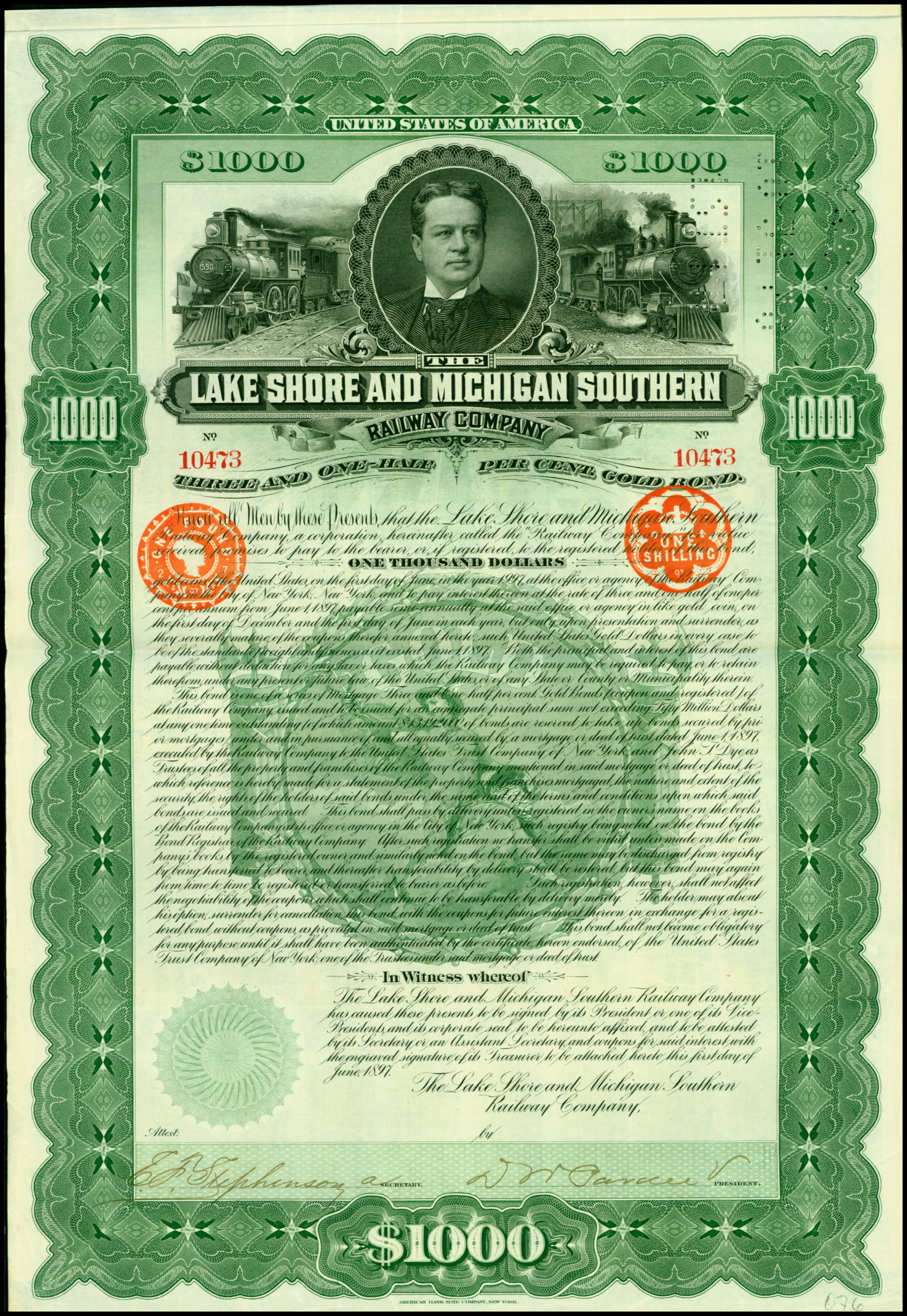
Gold Bond of the Lake Shore and Michigan Southern Railway Company, issued 1 June 1897.

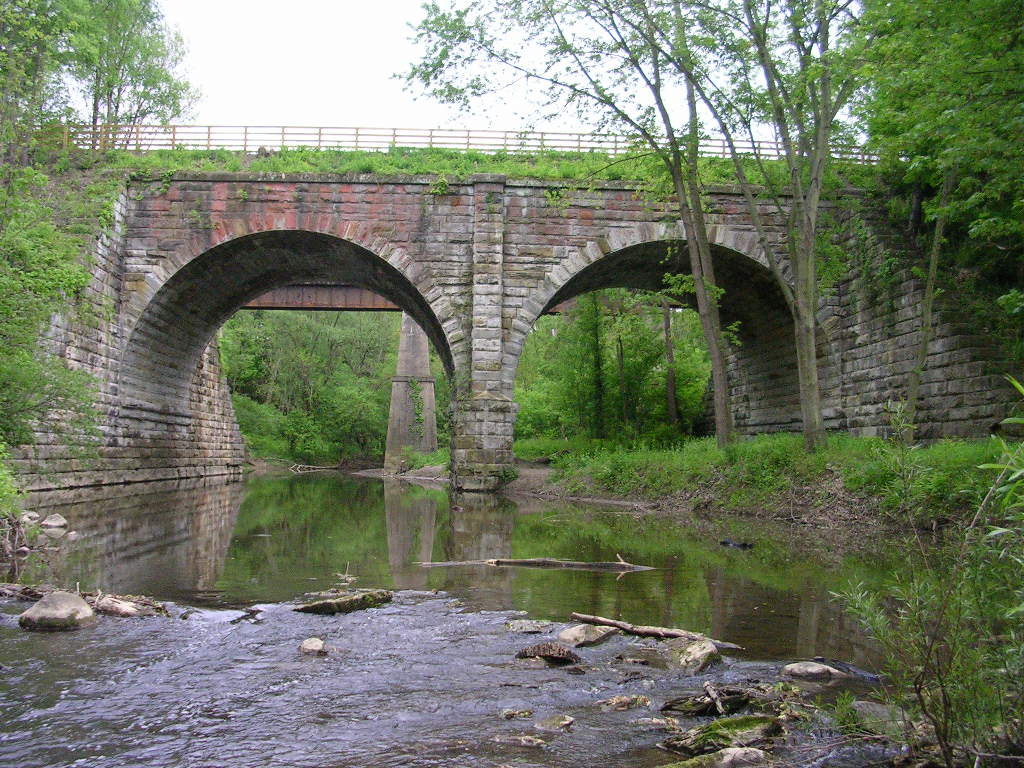
LSMS double arch bridge over the East Branch of the Huron River, just west of Norwalk, Ohio. A similar, but smaller-sized bridge, exists to the east in the Ohio town of Wakeman.

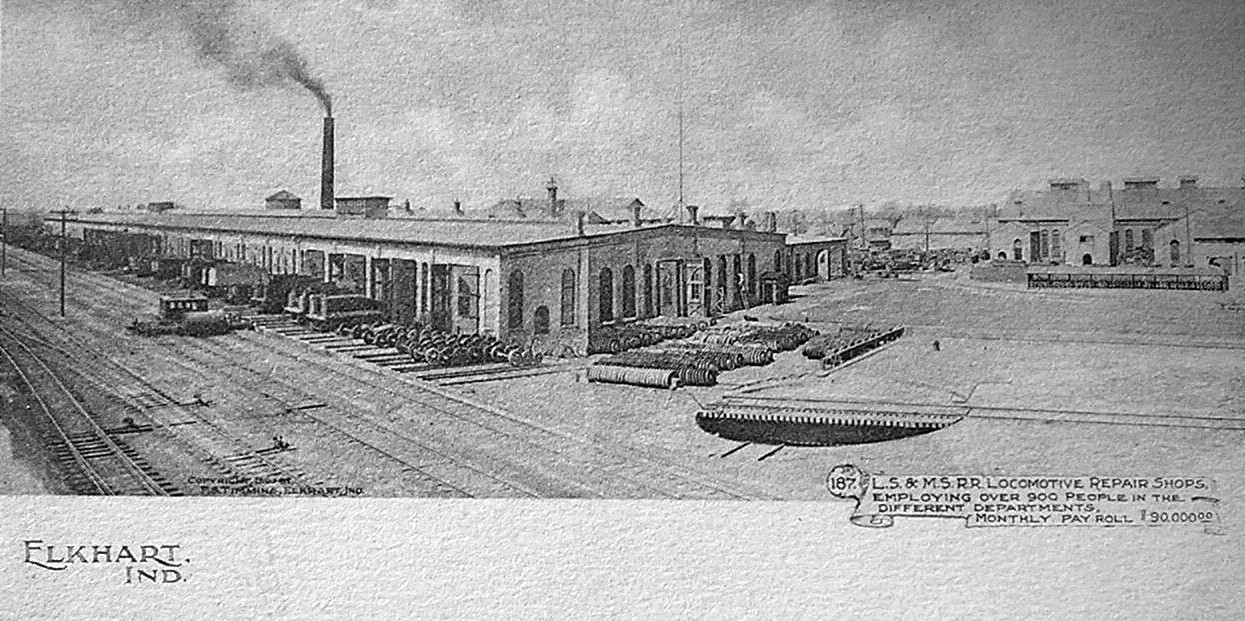
The Elkhart, Indiana shops in 1903.

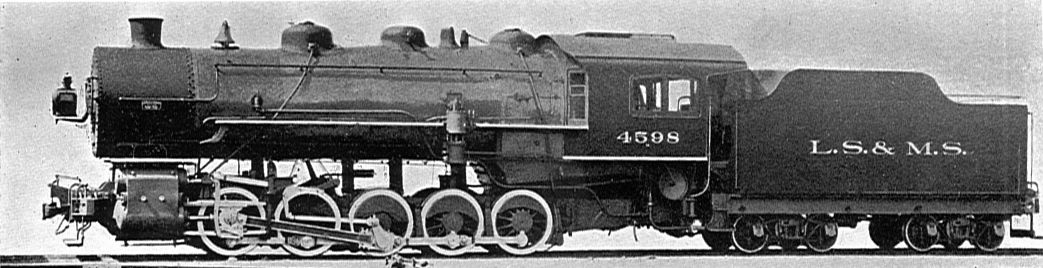
0-10-0 "Decapod" switching locomotive of 1907

Around 1877, Cornelius Vanderbilt, and his New York Central and Hudson River Railroad, gained a majority of stock of the Lake Shore and Michigan Southern Railway. The line provided an ideal extension of the New York Central main line from Buffalo, west to Chicago, along with the route across southern Ontario, the Canada Southern Railway and the Michigan Central Railroad.

On December 29, 1876, The Pacific Express passenger train was passing over a bridge in Ashtabula, Ohio, when it collapsed due to structural failure, causing the Ashtabula River Railroad Disaster which killed 92 and injured 64.

=== New York Central Railroad: 1914–1968 ===
On December 22, 1914, the New York Central and Hudson River Railroad merged with the Lake Shore and Michigan Southern Railway to form the New York Central Railroad. While the original main line was to the south of Sandusky Bay, between Toledo and Elyria, the northern alignment, the Sandusky Division, eventually became the main line.

=== Post-NYC: 1968–present ===
In 1968, the New York Central merged with the Pennsylvania Railroad and the New York, New Haven and Hartford Railroad to form the Penn Central Transportation Company, Penn Central, which two years later, filed for bankruptcy. In 1976, it became part of Conrail. In 1976, the Southern Division, from Elyria to Millbury, was abandoned, with parts of the former right of way now in use as a recreational trail, the North Coast Inland Trail. Under Conrail, the Lake Shore main line was part of the New York City–Chicago, Chicago Line.

In 1998, Conrail was split between CSX and Norfolk Southern. The Chicago Line east of Cleveland, went to CSX, and was split into several subdivisions: the Lake Shore Subdivision, from Buffalo, to Erie, the Erie West Subdivision, from Erie, to east of Cleveland, and the Cleveland Terminal Subdivision, into downtown Cleveland. From the former Cleveland and Pittsburgh Railroad junction in Cleveland, west to Chicago, the line is now Norfolk Southern's Chicago Line.

Amtrak's New York City–Chicago Lake Shore Limited runs along the full route from Buffalo west. The Floridian joins in Cleveland, at the "Amtrak Connection" from the former Pennsylvania Railroad, C&P line, just east of the present Cleveland Station (MP 181), on its way from Washington, D.C., to Chicago. Passenger trains along the route originally terminated at LaSalle Street Station, but now run to Union Station, switching to the parallel former Pittsburgh, Fort Wayne and Chicago Railway, Pennsylvania Railroad, at a crossover in Whiting, Indiana, Indiana, (41.68480°N 87.49534°W) to get there.

== Branches ==
A major branch of the LS&MS extended from Northeastern Ohio, to the coal and oil fields of northwestern Pennsylvania, terminating near Brookville. Originally the line extended to the oil fields and refineries on the Allegheny River, at Franklin, and Oil City, Pennsylvania.

The line was later extended from Polk Junction, west of Franklin, to Rose, Pennsylvania, just west of Brookville. Also added was a connector south from Franklin, to the Allegheny River crossing on the new extension. This line included perhaps the most impressive engineering structures on the LS&MS, as well as the later NYC, with several large trestles, bridges, and tunnels, near Brookville, including a bridge-tunnel-bridge-tunnel-fill combination near Piney, Pennsylvania, and two magnificent trestles west of Brookville, near Corsica, Pennsylvania. The New York Central used trackage rights over the Pennsylvania Railroad and the B&O Railroad to connect from Rose to NYC lines at Clearfield, Pennsylvania.

There were several mines on this line near Brookville, as well as a connection to the Lake Erie, Franklin and Clarion (LEF&C) at Sutton, Pennsylvania, and connections to the Pennsylvania Railroad, and via the Pennsy, to the Pittsburgh & Shawmut, at Brookville.

After Conrail took over this line, they renamed it the Clarion Secondary, using it to serve coal loaders and interchange with the LEF&C. The branch from Polk Junction to Franklin was out of service by the late 1970s. Initially, traffic on the route remained strong, to the point that Conrail installed welded rail along the length of the line in the early 1980s to allow trains to run at 30 mph. By the late 80s, most coal loaders on the line had closed, and on March 5, 1988, Conrail ran the last train on the line between the western end of the Clarion Trestle and Dorset, Ohio. The tracks on this portion of the line were removed in the early 1990s, and today, much of it is a Rail Trail.

Conrail continued service on the line between the Clarion Trestle and the connection with the Low Grade near Brookville (Rose Junction), a distance of roughly 25 miles, to serve the Piney Mine, and interchange with the LEF&C. By this time, Conrail called the route the Piney Branch. In 1991, Conrail sold the line to the Pittsburg & Shawmut Railroad, who operated it as the Mountain Laurel Railroad. However, things did not improve. The LEF&C was abandoned in 1993, ending the use of the interchange at Sutton, and finally in 1995, the Piney Mine closed. The Shawmut became a part of the Genesse & Wyoming Railroad in 1996, and ran one last train along the line in 1998 to salvage equipment, and filed for abandonment of the line shortly after.

Around 2000, the Shawmut sold the still intact Piney Branch to the Kovalchick Corporation. Kovalchick intended to place the Piney Branch back in service and operate it as a tourist railroad, in order to show off the impressive trestles on the line. However, the Pennsylvania Public Utility Commission ordered Kovalchick to remove the tracks and all bridges on the line due to safety concerns with the bridges, and the lack of active grade crossing warning systems at railroad crossings along the line. Despite Kovalchick's offering to improve the safety and security of the line and bridges, the PUC ultimately won. The Commission ordered the Kovalchick Corporation to remove all track and all bridges crossing public roads on the Piney Branch in 2006. Removal of the tracks began in 2007, and removal of bridges began in early 2008. This included the removal of the impressive Coder and Carrier Viaducts. The trestle over the Clarion river, however, still remains intact as of 2025.

== Station listing - Main Line ==
State	Distance	Station	City	Opened	Closed	Connections and notes
New York		Buffalo	Buffalo			Amtrak Empire Service and Maple Leaf; Lake Shore Railway Museum
New York		Lackawanna	Lackawanna		1920s	
New York		West Seneca				
New York		Blasdell	Blasdell		1920s	
New York		Bay View			1940s	
New York		Athol Springs	Athol Springs		1940s	
New York		Wanakah			1920s	
New York		Lake View	Lake View		1940s	
New York		North Evans				
New York		Derby	Derby		1940s	
New York		Angola	Angola		1950s	
New York		Farnham	Farnham		1940s	
New York		Irving	Irving		1940s	
New York		Silver Creek	Silver Creek		1950s	
New York		Waites Crossing			1920s	
New York		Dunkirk	Dunkirk		1971	Connection to Titusville Branch; Former Union Station shared by Erie Railroad and New York Central trains stopped at the same station.
New York		Van Buren			1920s	
New York		Brocton	Brocton		1940s	
New York		Portland	Portland		1920s	
New York		Westfield	Westfield		1971	NRHP
New York		Forsyth	Forsyth		1920s	
New York		Ripley	Ripley		1948	
New York		State Line	State Line		1920s	
Pennsylvania		North East	North East		1960s	Lake Shore Railway Museum
Pennsylvania		Moorhead			1920s	
Pennsylvania		Harbor Creek	Harbor Creek Twp.		1940s	
Pennsylvania		Wesleyville				
Pennsylvania		Erie	Erie			Amtrak Lake Shore Limited
Pennsylvania		Swanville	Swanville	1852	1940s	
Pennsylvania		Fairview	Fairview Twp.	1852	1940s	
Pennsylvania		North Girard		1852	1950s	Formerly named Girard; Later renamed to Lake City
Pennsylvania		Springfield	Springfield Twp.	1852	1940s	
Ohio		Conneaut	Conneaut	1852	1960s	Conneaut Historic Railroad Museum
Ohio		Kingsville	Kingsville	1852	1948	Last served by eastbound-only commuter
Ohio		Ashtabula	Ashtabula	1852	1971	Demolished in 2018
Ohio		Saybrook		1852	1950s	
Ohio		Geneva	Geneva	1852	1960s	
Ohio		Unionville	Unionville	1852	1950s	
Ohio		Madison		1852	1948	Last served by eastbound-only commuter
Ohio		Perry		1852	1950s	
Ohio		Lane			1920s	
Ohio		Painesville		1851	1971	Painesville Railroad Museum
Ohio		Heisley			1930s	Flag stop
Ohio		Mentor	Mentor	1851	1948	Last served by eastbound-only commuter; NRHP
Ohio		Reynolds			1930s	Flag stop
Ohio		Willoughby	Willoughby	1851	1948	Last served by eastbound-only commuter
Ohio		Rush Road			1920s	Flag stop
Ohio		Wickliffe	Wickliffe	1851	1930s	
Ohio		Noble			1920s	
Ohio		Nottingham		1851	1950s	Formerly named Euclid
Ohio		Collinwood	Cleveland		1930s	Formerly named Collamer
Ohio		Coit Road	Cleveland		1870s	
Ohio		Coits	Cleveland	1870s	1920s	
Ohio		East 105th Street	Cleveland		1930s	Formerly named Glenville
Ohio		East 55th Street	Cleveland		1920s	Formerly named Wilson Street
Ohio		East 40th Street	Cleveland		1920s	Formerly named Case Street; Flag stop
Ohio		Cleveland	Cleveland	1851	1930	Replaced by Cleveland Union Terminal (1930–1971); CCC&St.L stop (1972); Cleveland Lakefront Station (1975–present)
Ohio		West Cleveland	Cleveland			
Ohio		West Park	Cleveland		1930s	
Ohio		Berea	Berea		1950s	Union Depot, with Big Four Railway
Ohio		Olmsted Falls	Olmsted Falls		1950s	
Ohio		Shawville			1950s	
Ohio		Elyria	Elyria			Amtrak Lake Shore Limited and Floridian
Ohio		Amherst	Amherst		1940s	
Ohio		Brownhelm	Brownhelm Twp.		1920s	
Ohio		Vermilion	Vermilion		1940s	
Ohio		Ceylon	Ceylon		1940s	
Ohio		Huron	Huron		1940s	
Ohio		Sandusky	Sandusky			Amtrak Lake Shore Limited and Floridian; NRHP
Ohio		Venice		1874	1940s	
Ohio		Bay Bridge			1920s	
Ohio		Danbury	Danbury		1940s	
Ohio		Gypsum	Gypsum		1940s	
Ohio		Port Clinton	Port Clinton	1874	1971	
Ohio		La Carne	La Carne		1950s	
Ohio		Oak Harbor	Oak Harbor	1874	1940s	
Ohio		Rocky Ridge	Rocky Ridge		1940s	
Ohio		Graytown	Graytown	1874	1940s	
Ohio		Martin			1940s	
Ohio		Millbury	Millbury		1950s	
Ohio		Toledo	Toledo			Amtrak Lake Shore Limited and Floridian
Ohio		Air Line Junction	Toledo		1920s	
Ohio		Holland	Holland		1950s	
Ohio		Swanton	Swanton		1950s	
Ohio		Delta	Delta		1950s	
Ohio		Wauseon	Wauseon		1950s	
Ohio		Pettisville	Pettisville		1950s	
Ohio		Archbold	Archbold		1950s	
Ohio		Stryker	Stryker		1950s	
Ohio		Bryan	Bryan			Amtrak Lake Shore Limited
Ohio		Melbern	Melbern		1950s	
Ohio		Edgerton	Edgerton		1950s	
Indiana		Butler	Butler		1950s	
Indiana		Waterloo	Waterloo			Amtrak Lake Shore Limited and Floridian
Indiana		Corunna	Corunna		1950s	
Indiana		Kendallville	Kendallville		1960s	
Indiana		Brimfield	Brimfield		1950s	
Indiana		Wawaka	Wawaka		1950s	
Indiana		Ligonier	Ligonier		1950s	
Indiana		Millersburg	Millersburg		1950s	
Indiana		Goshen	Goshen		1950s	
Indiana		Elkhart	Elkhart			Amtrak Lake Shore Limited and Floridian; National New York Central Railroad Museum; Stopped serving commuter trains in 1964
Indiana		Osceola	Osceola		1950s	
Indiana		Mishawaka	Mishawaka		1950s	
Indiana		South Bend	South Bend			Amtrak Lake Shore Limited and Floridian; Stopped serving commuter trains in 1964
Indiana		Lydick			1920s	
Indiana		Terre Coupee			1920s	
Indiana		New Carlisle	New Carlisle		1950s	
Indiana		Rolling Prairie	Rolling Prairie		1920s	
Indiana		La Porte	La Porte		1971	Stopped serving commuter trains in 1964
Indiana		Pinola			1920s	
Indiana		Durham			1940s	
Indiana		Otis	Otis		1950s	
Indiana		Burdick			1940s	
Indiana		Chesterton	Chesterton		1950s	NRHP; Stopped serving commuter trains in 1964
Indiana		Porter	Porter		1964	Commuter stop
Indiana		Dune Park	Burns Harbor ?		1920s	Stopped serving commuter trains in 1950s; flag stop
Indiana		Ogden Dunes			1950s	Commuter stop
Indiana		Millers	Gary		1920s	Stopped serving commuter trains in 1950s
Indiana		Gary	Gary		1971	Stopped serving commuter trains in 1964
Indiana		Kirk Yard			1950s	Commuter stop
Indiana		Curtis			1950s	Commuter stop
Indiana		Pine			1950s	Commuter flag stop
Indiana		Buffington			1950s	Commuter stop
Indiana		Indiana Harbor	East Chicago		1950s	Stopped serving commuter trains in 1964
Indiana		Mahoning			1964	Commuter stop
Indiana		Whiting	Whiting		1950s	Stopped serving commuter trains in 1964
Illinois		Robertsdale	Chicago		1950s	Commuter stop
Illinois		East Side	Chicago		1940s	Stopped serving commuter trains in 1964
Illinois		South Chicago	Chicago		1940s	Stopped serving commuter trains in 1964
Illinois		71st Street	Chicago		1950s	Commuter stop
Illinois		Park Manor	Chicago		1950s	Commuter stop
Illinois		Englewood	Chicago		1971	Stopped serving commuter trains in 1978
Illinois		31st Street	Chicago			
Illinois		Chicago	Chicago			Metra Rock Island District

== See also ==
- LeGrand Lockwood, company treasurer
- John E. Gunckel, passenger agent

Competitors

- Michigan Central Railroad
- New York, Chicago and St. Louis Railroad (Nickel Plate Road)
