= Cleveland Lakefront Station =

Railway station in Cleveland, Ohio, US

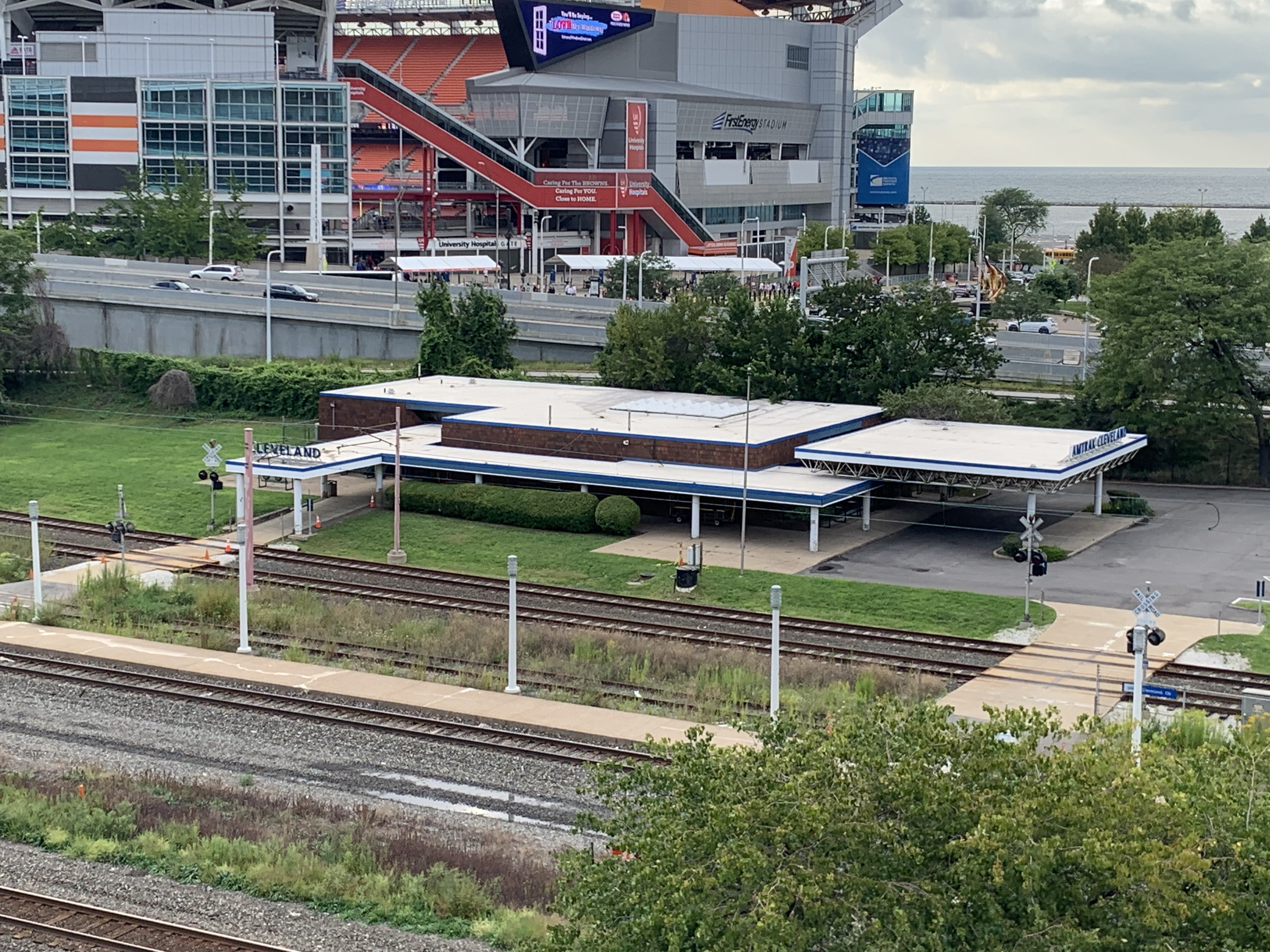
- Amtrak station in August 2022

General information
- Location: 200 Cleveland Memorial Shoreway; Cleveland, Ohio; United States
- Coordinates: 41°30′20″N 81°41′47″W
- Owner: Amtrak
- Line: NS Chicago Line / Cleveland Line
- Platforms: 1 island platform
- Tracks: 4

Construction
- Structure type: At-grade
- Parking: Yes
- Accessible: Amtrak platform accessible, RTA car stop not accessible

Other information
- Station code: Amtrak: CLE

History
- Opened: October 28, 1975; 50 years ago
- Rebuilt: 1977

Passengers
- FY 2025: 61,685 (Amtrak)

Services
Preceding station	Amtrak	Following station
Elyria toward Chicago	Floridian	Alliance toward Miami
Elyria toward Chicago	Lake Shore Limited	Erie toward New York or Boston South
Preceding station	Rapid Transit	Following station
West 3rd toward Tower City	Waterfront Line	East 9th–North Coast toward South Harbor
Former services
Preceding station	Amtrak	Following station
Elyria toward Chicago	Pennsylvanian 1998–2003	Alliance toward Philadelphia
Elyria toward Chicago	Capitol Limited 1990–2024	Alliance toward Washington, D.C.
Location

Cleveland Lakefront Station is an Amtrak train station at North Coast Harbor in Cleveland, Ohio. The current station was built in 1977 to provide service to the Lake Shore Limited route (New York/Boston-Chicago), which was reinstated by Amtrak via Cleveland and Toledo in 1975. It replaced service to Cleveland Union Terminal. Lakefront Station is located in downtown Cleveland near the Lake Erie waterfront, adjacent to the Cleveland Memorial Shoreway and in the immediate vicinity of the Rock and Roll Hall of Fame, the Great Lakes Science Center, the Steamship William G. Mather Museum and Cleveland Browns Stadium. The station has had little renovation since its opening.

The station is a service stop on Amtrak's daily Lake Shore Limited and Floridian trains, both of which pass through in the middle of the night. The station is also served by the RTA Waterfront Line. The Pennsylvanian served Cleveland from 1998 to 2003, when it reverted to its original Pittsburgh–New York route. As of 2021, proposals exist for the Pennsylvanian and several other routes to return to Cleveland.

== History ==
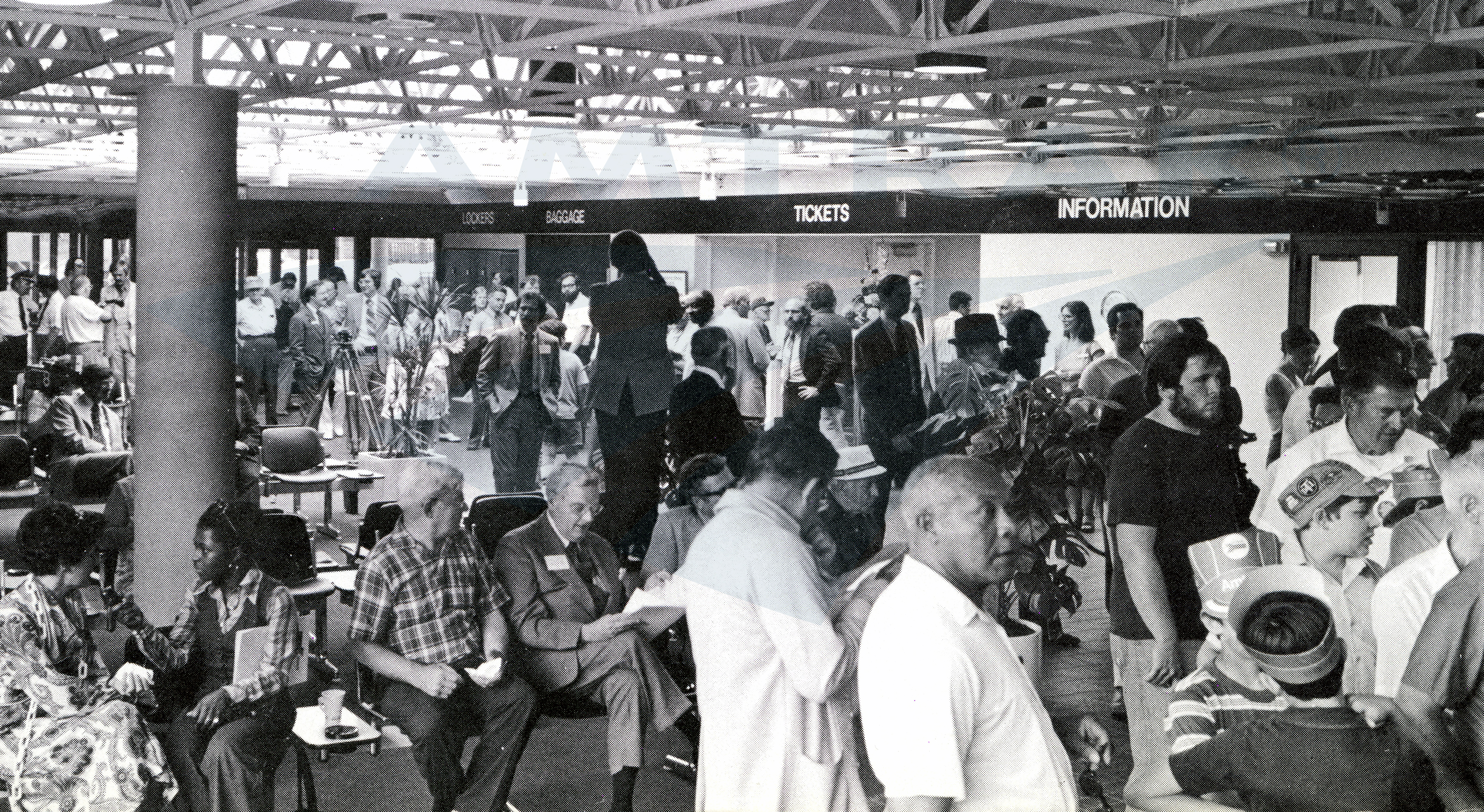
Cleveland Lakefront station after dedication ceremony, July 1977

Lakefront Station was built as a replacement for Cleveland Union Terminal (now Tower City Center), which was built in 1928 and served as the main terminal for the Shaker Heights Rapid Transit, and in 1955, the crosstown Red Line. The newly formed Amtrak initially ran a single route through Cleveland, the Lake Shore, when it launched in 1971. However, Amtrak chafed at Cleveland Union Terminal's high rent and the need to switch to electric locomotives to access its enclosed platforms. Additionally, Cleveland's rail traffic had declined over the last quarter century to the point that it no longer began to justify such a massive facility. Amtrak rerouted passenger service to the ex-Big Four Railroad tracks on January 2, 1972. The "platform" extended from the former Erie Railroad depot to the intersection of Superior Avenue and Old River Road, underneath the Detroit–Superior Bridge. This stop was discontinued when the Lake Shore ended service on January 5.

For the next three years, Cleveland was severed from the national rail network. Construction of a temporary station began in September 1975. This temporary station opened for Lake Shore Limited service on October 31, 1975. Groundbreaking of the current Lakefront Station was August 31, 1976, with the station officially opened on June 29, 1977. The formal dedication of the station occurred on July 12. According to Amtrak's employee magazine, a crowd of more than 300 gathered for the dedication of the $552,000 depot. Speakers included Mary J. Head, vice chairman of the Amtrak Board of Directors, and Cleveland Mayor Ralph J. Perk. Following the dedication ceremony, attendees were invited to tour the facility and enjoy cake and coffee.

Lakefront Station has undergone little renovation since its opening. In recent years, its lack of modernization has become more noticeable, especially its appearance and lack of adequate signage. In August 2012, when the Huntington Convention Center of Cleveland was under construction, a Cuyahoga County official expressed a desire to keep Lakefront Station out of view, and even Amtrak officials conceded that the station had not aged well. One proposed solution was to build a new station underground, but due to a lack of funding, the county settled on hiding the station behind trees and shrubs as a short-term solution.

== Services ==
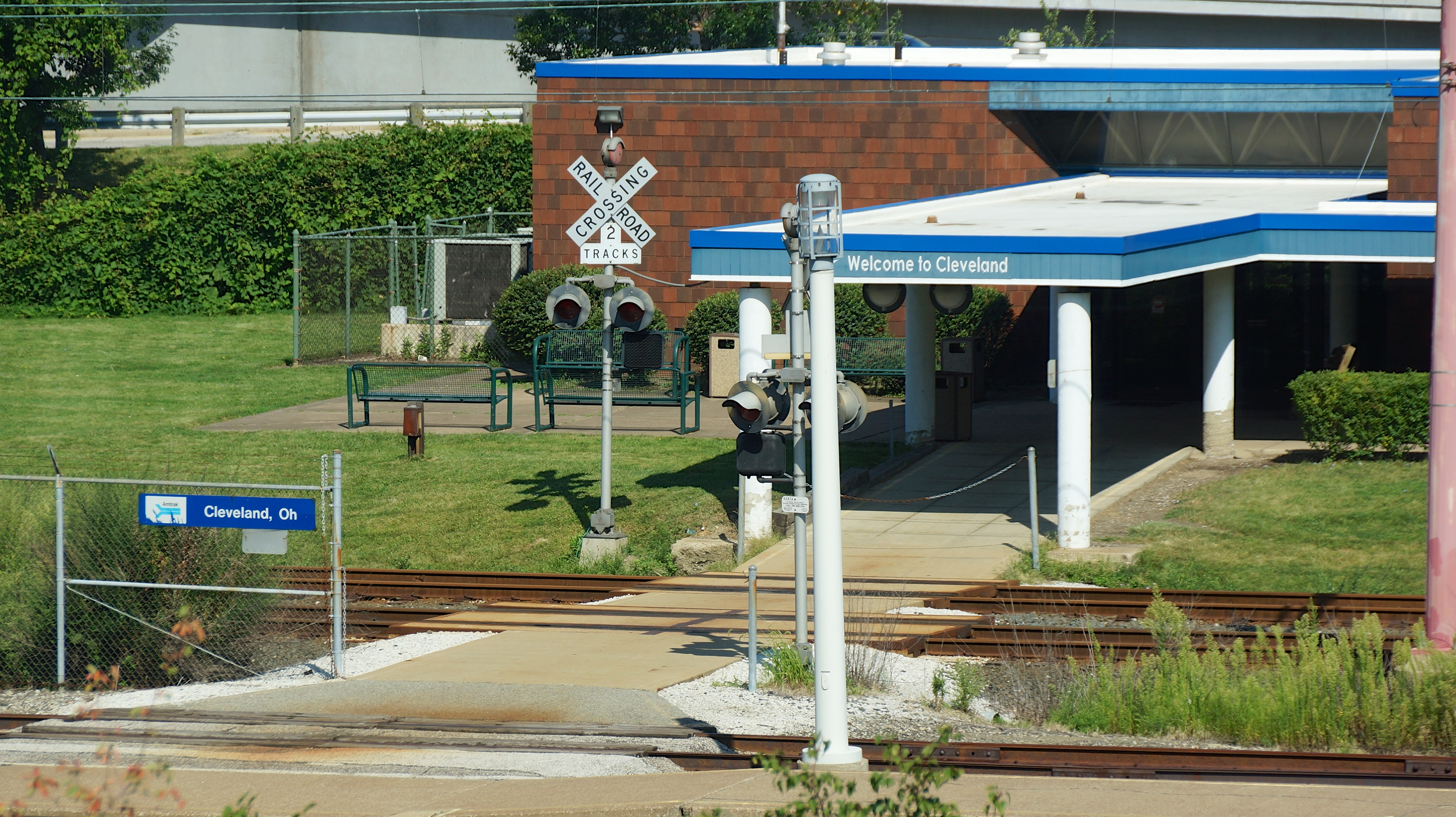
Grade crossing at Lakefront Station that leads to the station's building.

Cleveland has four daily trains: the Floridian (trains 40 and 41) between Miami and Chicago, and the Lake Shore Limited (trains 48/448 and 49/449) between Chicago and New York City/Boston. As of November 2024, these trains were scheduled to arrive/depart from Cleveland at various times between 1:00 a.m. and 5:50 a.m. The timing of the departures and arrivals has drawn criticism, with Amtrak also trying to tinker with train schedules through suggestions, reminding people that the schedules are not set in stone.

The Cleveland RTA Rapid Waterfront Line tracks separate the station building and Amtrak platform. There is no platform for the Waterfront Line trains, but they will stop at the station upon request, with passengers discharging at the at-grade pedestrian connection to the building. The stop is not accessible. However, the Waterfront Line does not run during most of the time of day that includes Amtrak arrivals or departures.

The Lake Shore Limited has served Lakefront Station from its opening in 1975. The Capitol Limited began stopping at Lakefront on November 12, 1990, after Conrail's abandonment of portions of the ex-Pittsburgh, Fort Wayne and Chicago Railway in northwestern Indiana forced the re-routing of that train along with the Broadway Limited. Previously it had passed to the south, serving Canton. Between 1998 and 2003, the Pennsylvanian served Cleveland, providing daylight service to Chicago and Philadelphia. Weak ridership prompted Amtrak to return the train to a Pittsburgh–New York schedule. On November 10, 2024, the Capitol Limited was merged with the Silver Star as the Floridian.

On May 27, 2021, Amtrak released a long-range planning document detailing plans for multiple new corridor routes, including possible extensions of one round trip of the Pennsylvanian and Empire Service each to Cleveland. In addition, there are proposals for three round trips to Detroit via Toledo, and to Cincinnati via Columbus and Dayton. However, Lakefront Station is not large enough to accommodate this proposed dramatic increase in service. For this reason, a group by the name of All Aboard Ohio is pushing for the restoration of rail service at Cleveland Union Terminal.

== Station layout ==
Amtrak trains stop on the southernmost track at a side platform; the RTA tracks do not have any true platforms, but RTA trains can stop on the walkway between the station building and Amtrak platform. The structure has a porte-cochère, which protects passengers from inclement weather. The interior was built with a similar design to that of the exterior, and features a central skylight. Shadows from its exposed trusses create different patterns on the brown brick floor, built in a basket-weaved pattern. Exposed ductwork is visible throughout the trusses, as are the light fixtures. All of the ceiling elements are painted white, which tend to recede and produce a sense of airiness which is further enhanced by the floor-to-ceiling windows. Banks of seats are located close to public telephones and a vending area.

== See also ==
- List of historical passenger rail services in Cleveland
