= Martin Luther King Jr. Plaza (Toledo) =

Transit center in Toledo, Ohio

Martin Luther King Jr. Plaza Toledo, OH
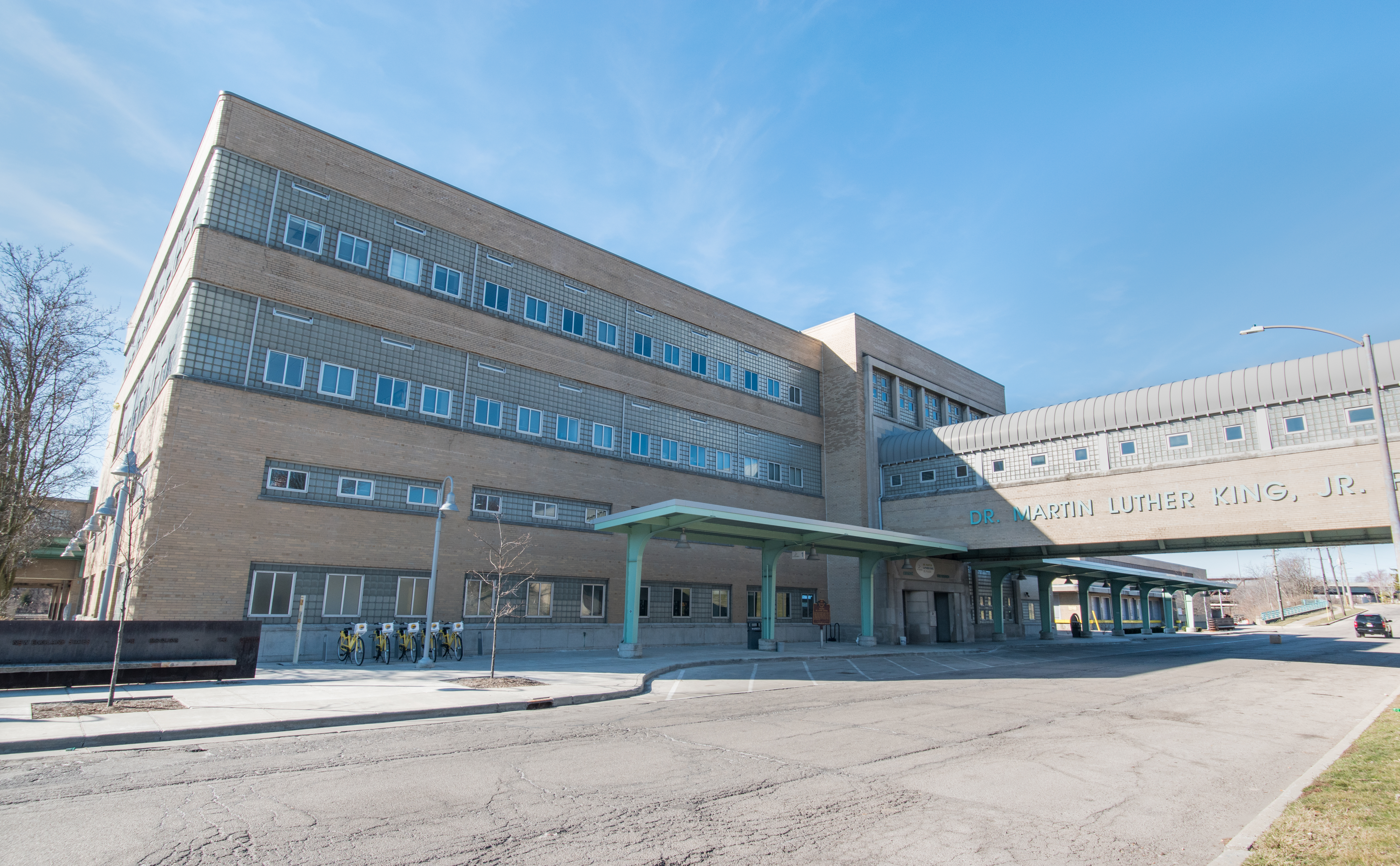
- The station building in 2021

General information
- Location: 415 Emerald Avenue; Toledo, Ohio; United States
- Coordinates: 41°38′16″N 83°32′30″W
- Owner: Toledo–Lucas County Port Authority
- Platforms: 3 island platforms (formerly 6 island platforms)
- Tracks: 2 (formerly 12)
- Connections: Amtrak Thruway; Barons Bus Lines; Greyhound Lines

Construction
- Parking: Yes
- Accessible: Yes

Other information
- Station code: Amtrak: TOL

History
- Opened: 1950
- Rebuilt: 1996, 2016

Passengers
- FY 2025: 46,755 (Amtrak)

Services
Preceding station	Amtrak	Following station
Waterloo toward Chicago	Floridian	Sandusky toward Miami
Bryan toward Chicago	Lake Shore Limited	Sandusky toward New York or Boston South
Former services
Preceding station	Amtrak	Following station
Waterloo toward Chicago	Pennsylvanian 1998–2003	Sandusky toward Philadelphia
Detroit toward Chicago	Lake Cities	Terminus
Detroit (Michigan Central) toward Chicago	Lake Cities	Terminus
Elkhart toward Chicago	Lake Shore	Cleveland toward New York (Grand Central)
Waterloo toward Chicago	Capitol Limited 1990–2024	Sandusky toward Washington, D.C.
Preceding station	Baltimore and Ohio Railroad	Following station
Perrysburg toward Cincinnati	Toledo Division	Monroe toward Detroit
Preceding station	Chesapeake and Ohio Railway	Following station
Terminus	Hocking Valley Railway; Main Line	Walbridge toward Athens
Cherry Street toward Detroit	Detroit – Toledo (Note: Ludington–Toledo direct service before 1930s as part of Pere Marquette Railway)	Terminus
Preceding station	New York Central Railroad	Following station
Air Line Junction toward Chicago	Main Line	Milbury Junction toward New York
Wagon Works toward Detroit	Detroit Branch	Terminus
Terminus	Toledo – Charleston	Lime City toward Charleston
Terminus	Toledo – Thurston	Moline toward Thurston
Sylvania toward Elkhart	Old Road	Terminus
Findlay toward Cincinnati	Cincinnati – Toledo	Terminus
Preceding station	Nickel Plate Road	Following station
Grand Rapids toward St. Louis	St. Louis – Toledo (before 1940)	Terminus
Preceding station	Wabash Railroad	Following station
Maumee toward Montpelier	Montpelier – Toledo	Terminus
Maumee toward Fort Wayne	Fort Wayne – Toledo	Terminus
Location

Martin Luther King Jr. Plaza (formerly Central Union Terminal and Central Union Plaza) is the main passenger rail and intercity bus station of Toledo, Ohio.

Toledo is served by two Amtrak routes: the Floridian, which operates daily between Chicago and Miami; and the Lake Shore Limited, which operates daily between Chicago and (via two sections east of Albany) Boston and New York City. The station is also served by Greyhound Lines and Barons Bus Lines.

Named for Martin Luther King Jr., the building was designed in Streamline Moderne style by Robert Crosbie. It is owned by the Toledo–Lucas County Port Authority.

== History ==
=== Original building ===
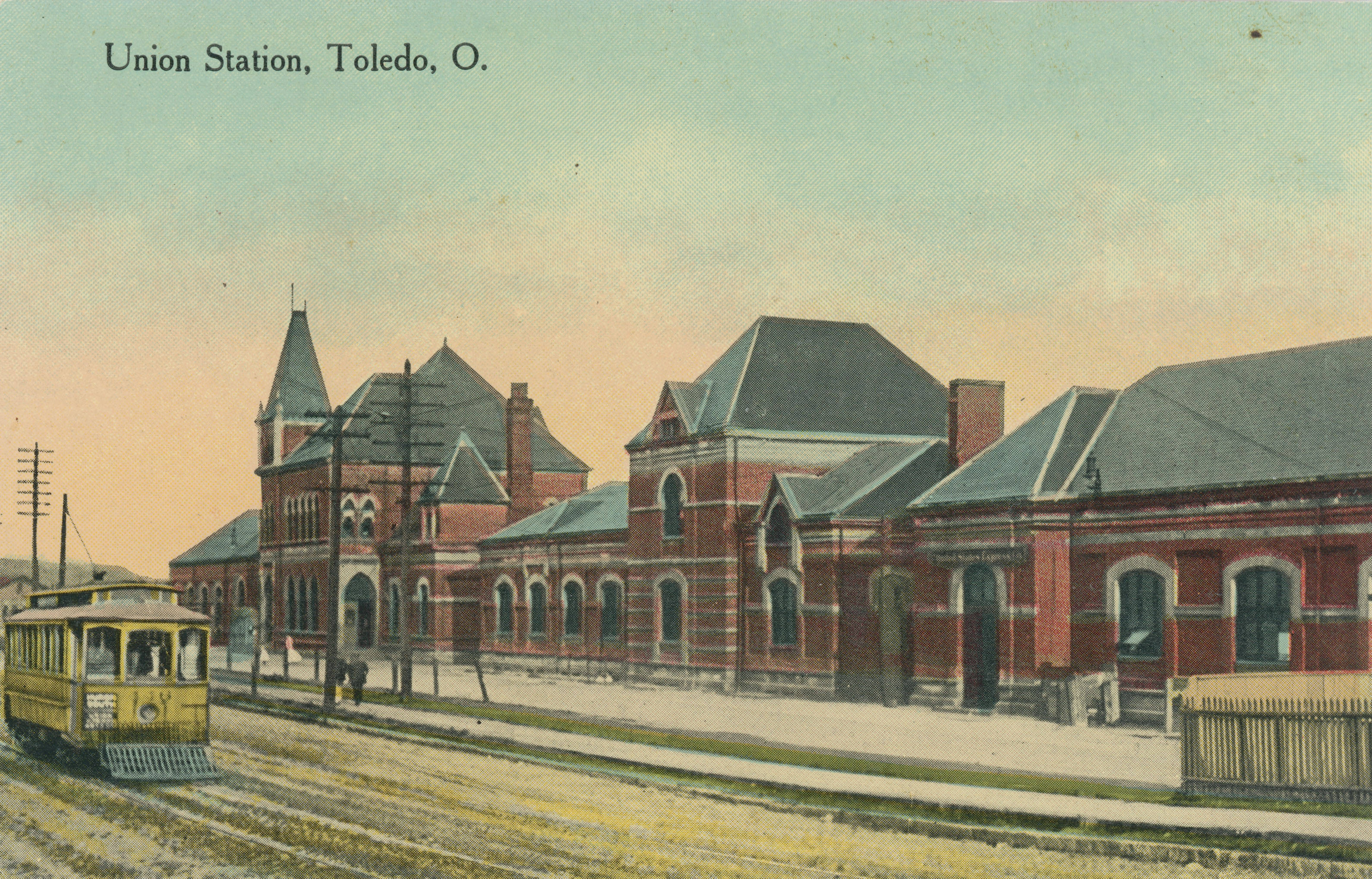
The 1886 Union Terminal with a streetcar appearing in the foreground

A union terminal, built in 1886 in the Gothic style, served several of the major rail lines passing through Toledo. Tenant railroads included the Baltimore and Ohio Railroad (B&O); the New York Central Railroad and its subsidiaries, the CCC & St.L. (Big Four Railroad) and the Michigan Central Railroad; the Pere Marquette Railroad; and the Wabash Railroad. The station caught fire in 1930 but remained standing. The damage was later repaired and service resumed.

A new station was being designed for Toledo, but the Great Depression delayed the construction of it. In the 1940s, the Toledo planning commission included rebuilding Union Terminal in a new vision for the city, but the plans were delayed even further by the outbreak of World War II.

=== Current building ===
==== Central Union Terminal (1950–1971) ====
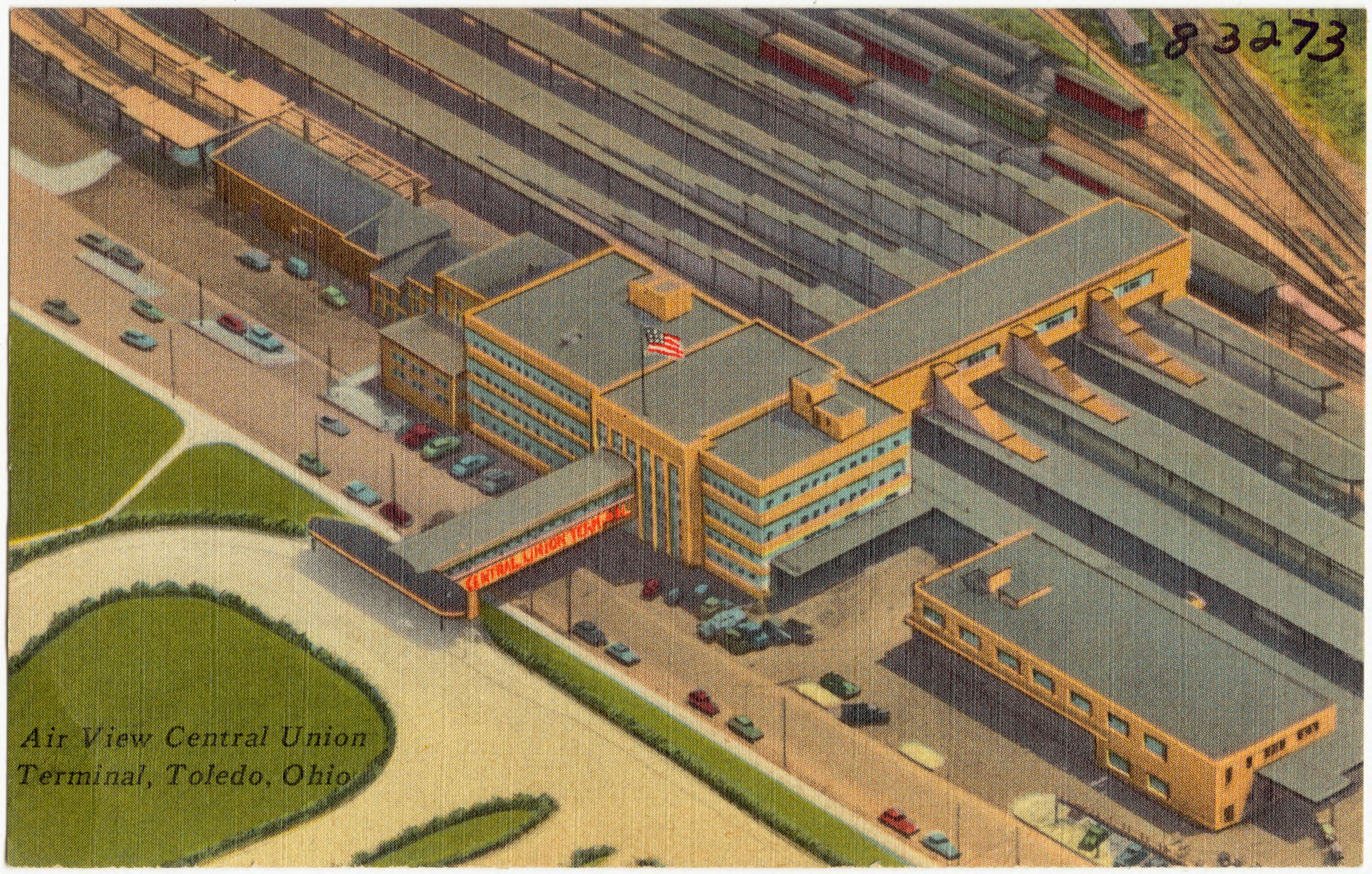
Aerial view of the Central Union Terminal

Considered one of the last of the New York Central Railroad's (NYC) great stations, the Central Union Terminal opened the week of September 17, 1950. It was the $5 million crown jewel of the railroad's post-war investment in Toledo, a project that also built eight other buildings and, with the Baltimore and Ohio Railroad, replaced a coal-loading facility in East Toledo with a larger $18.5 million one in Maumee Bay.

Over the next two decades, the Central Union Terminal was used by four major railroads: the NYC, B&O, Chesapeake and Ohio (C&O), the successor to the Pere Marquette, and the Wabash Railroad.

The first floor housed baggage services, while the second floor housed a YMCA for train crews. The passenger terminal and concourse were on the third floor, while the NYC Toledo division and dispatching offices were on the fourth.

Major named trains served at the station to late 1950s and early 1960s:

- Baltimore & Ohio:
  - Ambassador (Detroit–Baltimore)
- New York Central:
  - Cleveland Mercury (Detroit–Cleveland)
- Wabash:
  - connector trains to Fort Wayne, to connect with St. Louis Special and Wabash Cannon Ball

Major named trains served at the station to late 1960s and 1971:

- Baltimore and Ohio:
  - Cincinnatian (Detroit–Cincinnati)
  - Night Express (Detroit–Cincinnati)
- Chesapeake and Ohio:
  - Sportsman (Detroit–Phoebus)
- New York Central:
  - Iroquois (Chicago–Boston and New York City)
  - New England States (Chicago–Boston)

==== Amtrak era (1971–present) ====
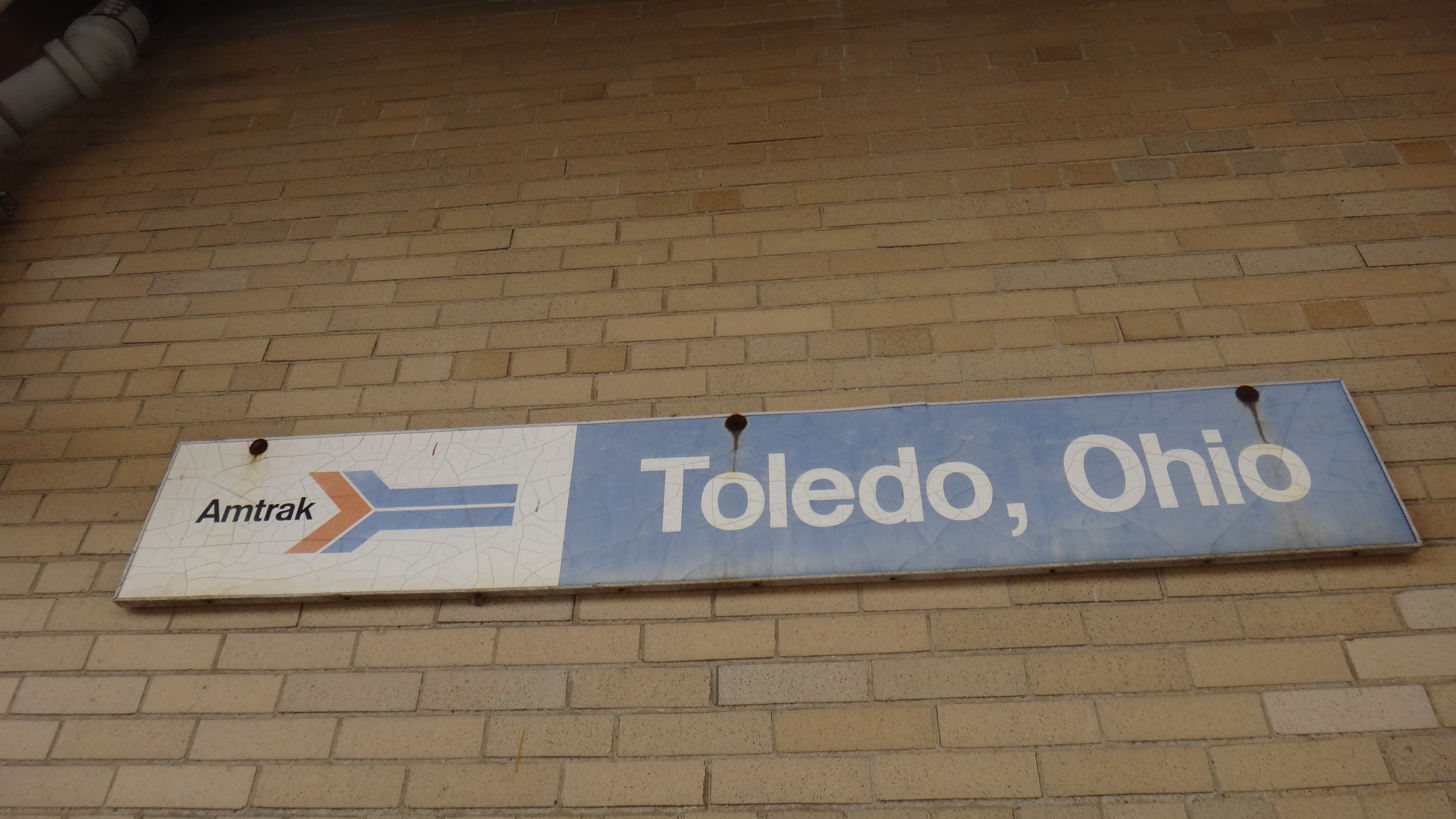
Toledo Amtrak sign in 2015

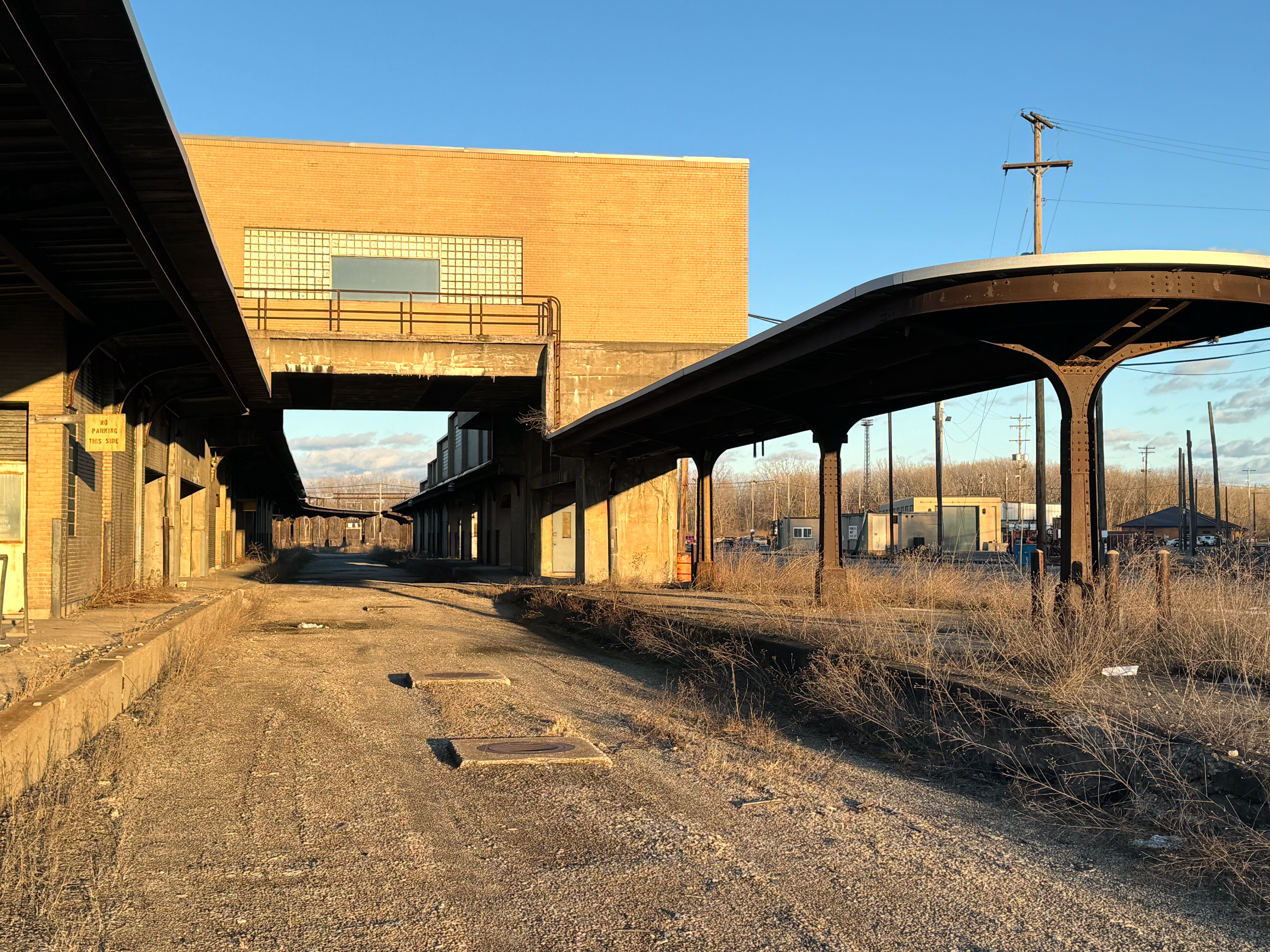
Abandoned platforms in 2024

In the early 1990s, local leaders decided against moving Amtrak into smaller, less costly quarters as had been done in many other cities during the 1970s and 80s. The Toledo–Lucas County Port Authority purchased the Central Union Terminal from Conrail for $20,000 in 1995. In 1996, the Port Authority completed an $8.5 million renovation of the building which included a spatial reorganization of the building along with a façade restoration, a new heating and air-conditioning system, a new roof and work on surrounding roadways and landscaping. The reorganization moved passenger areas from the third floor to the ground floor for better access to the street and platforms. No longer a railroad terminal, the building was renamed Central Union Plaza. The former passenger waiting room on the third floor was restored but is now used for meetings and events.

Through the late 1990s, Toledo was served by as many as six daily trains, including the Lake Cities from 1980 to 1995 and the Pennsylvanian from 1998 to 2003.

The building took its current name Martin Luther King Jr. Plaza in 2001. Before Amtrak stopped carrying mail in 2005, it stored material handling cars (MHCs) at the plaza on several unused platform tracks.

For the arrival of Greyhound Lines bus service in 2016, the station was remodeled again to add a ticket counter, office, freight room, a Subway restaurant and bus bays. Greyhound moved into the structure on June 23, 2016. Barons Bus Lines also began service to the station. The facility now serves as a modern intermodal train and bus terminal and office complex.

On November 10, 2024, the Capitol Limited was merged with the Silver Star as the Floridian.

== Services ==
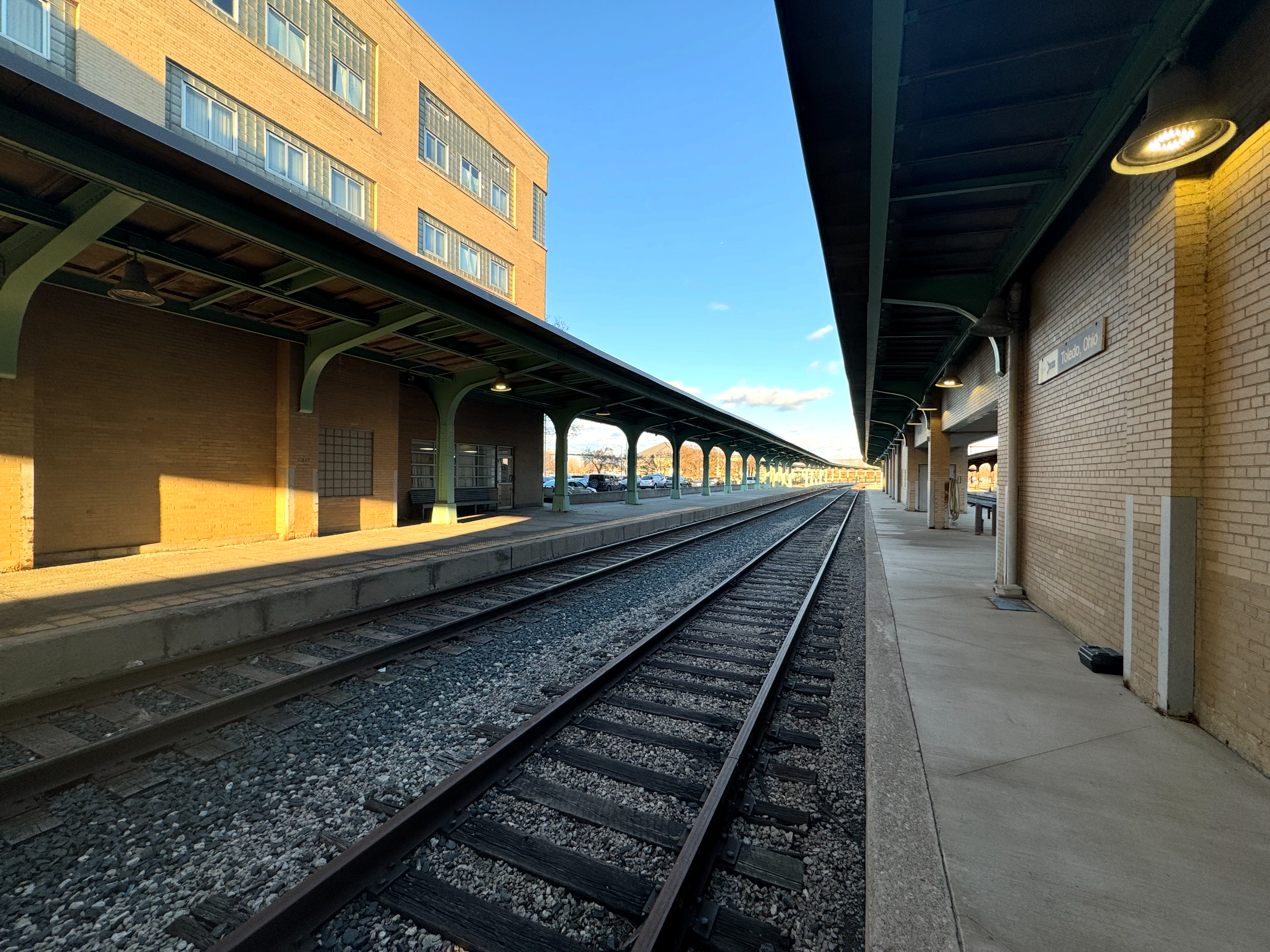
At platform level in 2024

=== Amtrak ===
Martin Luther King Jr. Plaza is served by Amtrak's Lake Shore Limited, which operates between New York City/Boston and Chicago, and the Floridian, which operates between Miami and Chicago. Amtrak primarily uses the track nearest the station (Track 1), however, has the option to use Track 3. Track 2 has been disconnected. Freight trains roll on bypass tracks at the south edge of the rail yard. Both westbound trains pass through Toledo early in the morning, while eastbound trains pass through in the middle of the night.

Toledo has the distinction of hosting the first National Train Day every year, a week before the event is held in other cities nationwide.

=== Intercity bus lines and routes ===
The plaza is also served by Greyhound routes connecting to Chicago; Cleveland; Charleston, West Virginia; Detroit; New York City; and Washington, D.C. Although Greyhound Bus Lines serves this facility, as of May, 1st, 2022 they no longer staff employees or sell tickets from this facility.

The plaza has several arrivals and departures from Barons Bus Lines, with routes to destinations around Ohio, Indiana, Pennsylvania, Illinois, New York, West Virginia, Virginia, North Carolina, and Michigan. The bus berths face the Emerald Avenue façade of the building.
