= Capitol Limited =

Amtrak service between Chicago and Washington, D.C.

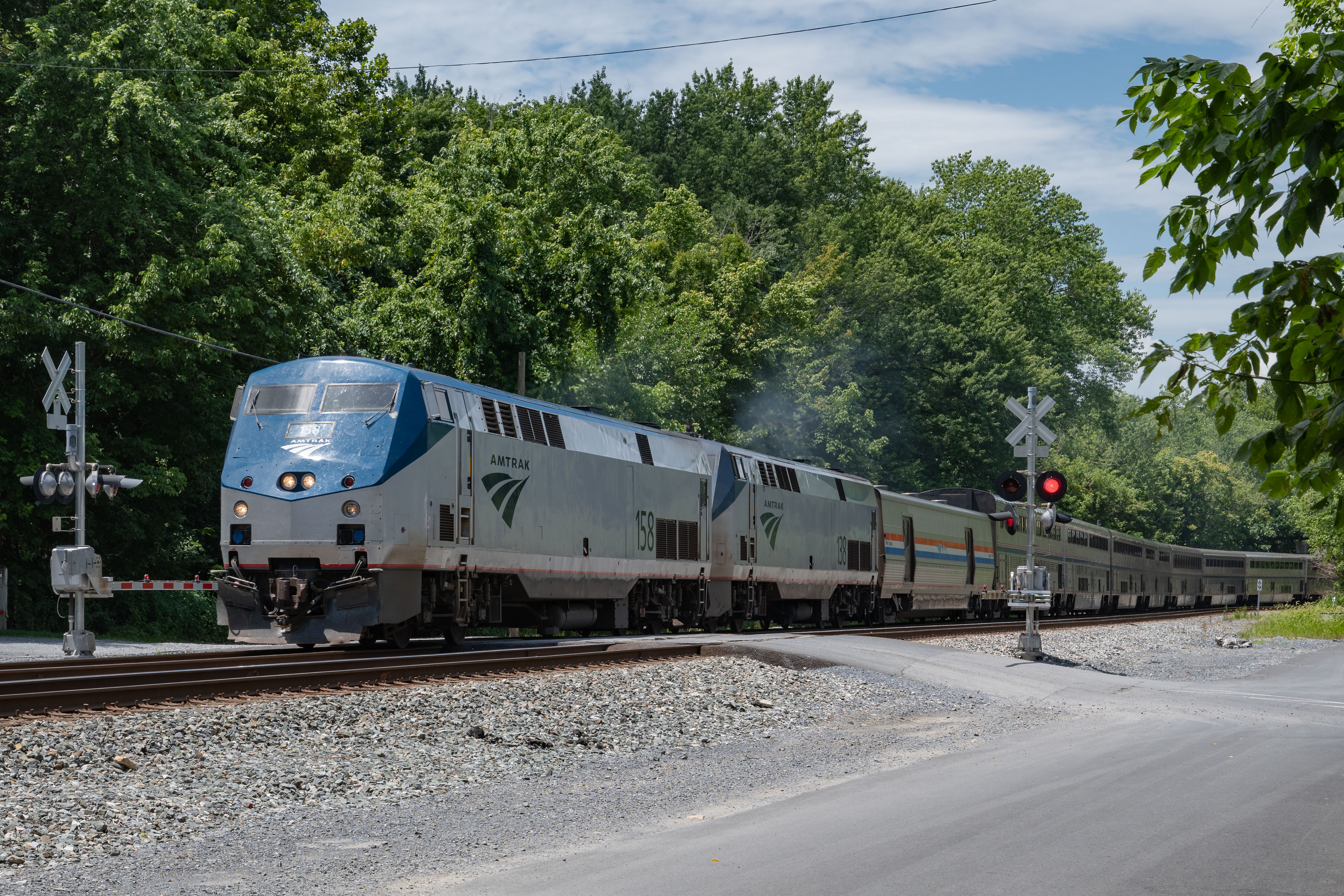
- The Capitol Limited near Point of Rocks in 2019

Overview
- Service type: Inter-city rail
- Status: Temporarily merged into the Floridian
- Locale: Eastern United States
- Predecessor: Shenandoah
- First service: October 1, 1981
- Last service: November 9, 2024
- Former operator: Amtrak
- Annual ridership: 18,504 (FY 25) (Note: Route suspended November 2024.) ▼ -88.7% (Note: Amtrak's Fiscal Year (FY) runs from October 1 of the prior year to September 30 of the named year.)

Route
- Termini: Washington, D.C. Chicago, Illinois
- Stops: 14
- Distance travelled: 780 miles (1,260 km)
- Average journey time: 17 hours, 30 minutes
- Service frequency: Daily
- Train number: 29, 30

On-board services
- Classes: Coach Class; Sleeper Service
- Disabled access: Train lower level, all stations
- Sleeping arrangements: Roomette (2 beds); Bedroom (2 beds); Bedroom Suite (4 beds); Accessible Bedroom (2 beds); Family Bedroom (4 beds)
- Catering facilities: Dining car, Café
- Observation facilities: Sightseer lounge car
- Baggage facilities: Overhead racks, checked baggage available at selected stations

Technical
- Rolling stock: GE Genesis; Siemens ALC-42; Superliner
- Track gauge: 4 ft 8 1/2 in (1,435 mm) standard gauge
- Operating speed: 45 mph (72 km/h) (avg.); 79 mph (127 km/h) (top)
- Track owners: CSX, NS

The Capitol Limited is a temporarily suspended daily Amtrak train between Washington, D.C., and Chicago, running 764 miles (1,230 km) via Pittsburgh and Cleveland. Service began in 1981. On November 10, 2024, Amtrak temporarily combined the Capitol Limited and Silver Star, producing a Chicago-Washington–Miami route, the Floridian.

The train was named for the Baltimore and Ohio Railroad's Capitol Limited, which ended in 1971 upon the formation of Amtrak. It carried the Amtrak train numbers 29 and 30, which were previously assigned to the discontinued National Limited.

During fiscal year 2023, the Capitol Limited carried 167,713 passengers, down 24.7% from FY2022.

== History ==
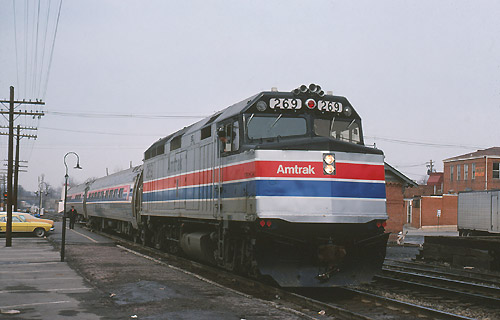
The Shenandoah, predecessor to the Capitol Limited, in 1978

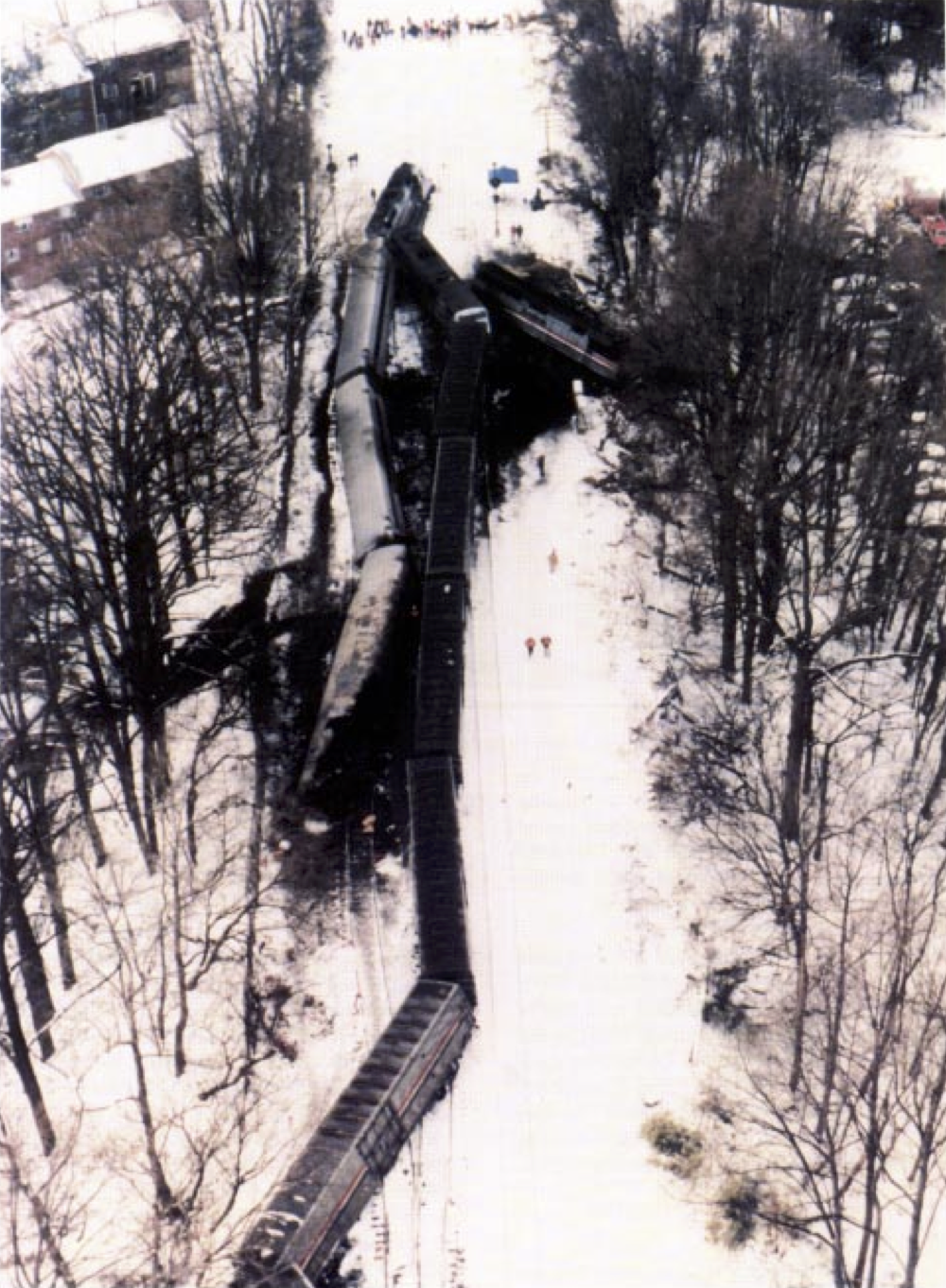
The Capitol Limited and a MARC commuter train collided at Silver Spring, Maryland in 1996

On October 1, 1981, Amtrak stopped running the Shenandoah, which connected Washington, D.C., and Cincinnati, Ohio, and began running the Capitol Limited. Amtrak's version of the CL ran over the same route as the B&O's train east of Pittsburgh, but west of Pittsburgh it ran combined with the Chicago-New York Broadway Limited over the former Pennsylvania Railroad's Pittsburgh, Fort Wayne and Chicago Railway. Its numbers, 440 (eastbound) and 441 (westbound), were derived from the Broadway Limited's 40 and 41 and the new train also used Heritage Fleet equipment. The new train replaced the Broadway Limited's former Washington section which had diverged at Philadelphia, Pennsylvania.

In late 1984, the Capitol Limited was re-equipped with new Amfleet II coaches but also lost its full diner east of Pittsburgh.

Beginning with the October 26, 1986, timetable, Amtrak split up the Capitol Limited and Broadway Limited. The Capitol Limited continued to operate over the same route, regained a full diner east of Pittsburgh (which it had lost in 1984), received new train numbers (29 and 30, which had been assigned to the defunct National Limited), and a later schedule.

On November 12, 1990, trains were rerouted west of Alliance, Ohio, due to Conrail's desire to abandon part of the former PFW&C in northwestern Indiana; the Capitol Limited now uses the former Pennsylvania Railroad Cleveland and Pittsburgh (C&P) line north from Alliance through Hudson, Ohio, to Cleveland route. The Broadway Limited and its successor, the Three Rivers, were re-routed over the B&O's Chicago-Pittsburgh route. In October 1994, Amtrak, with great fanfare, relaunched the Capitol Limited with a new bilevel Superliner II consist, and a further rerouting over the former New York Central Water Level Route. This new alignment took the Capitol through Cleveland, Toledo, and Elkhart, IN, which remains the case today.

On February 16, 1996, an eastbound rush-hour MARC commuter train headed to Washington Union Station collided with the westbound Capitol Limited near Georgetown Junction on a snow-covered stretch of track just west of Silver Spring, Maryland. Eleven people died aboard the MARC train in the accident. Three died of injuries suffered in the impact; the rest were killed by smoke and flames. The MARC engineer and two conductors were among the dead.

In November 2014, Amtrak, in the face of extreme delays, filed a complaint with the Surface Transportation Board, against CSX and Norfolk Southern, due to the frequency of extreme delays caused by freight train interference.

On April 19, 2018, Amtrak announced that it would discontinue full-service dining aboard the train on June 1. Instead of hot meals prepared on the train and served to diners in the dining car, sleeper passengers were now served a selection of primarily cold pre-packaged boxed meals, served in a "Sleeper Lounge". In January 2019, Amtrak expanded the boxed meal service to offer a full continental buffet at breakfast (with hot options such as oatmeal and breakfast sandwiches), and multiple hot entrées for lunch and dinner.

In October 2020, Amtrak temporarily reduced service on all long-distance routes, including the Capitol Limited, to three days per week due to the COVID-19 pandemic. Regular daily service was restored on May 31, 2021, with funding from the American Rescue Plan.

On November 10, 2024, the Capitol Limited and Silver Star were merged into a Chicago–Washington–Miami service, the Floridian. The Floridian service is intended to be temporary to accommodate equipment shortages and planned rehabilitation work in the East River Tunnels.

=== Through cars ===
Between 1984 and 1986 and again from 1991 to 1993, the Capitol Limited exchanged a Chicago-Miami coach with the New York-Miami Silver Star at Washington, D.C.

During 1997 and part of 1998, Amtrak operated the Capitol Limited in conjunction with the Southwest Chief, a daily Los Angeles–Chicago service. The two trains used the same Superliner equipment sets, and passengers traveling on both trains could remain aboard during the layover in Chicago. Originally announced in 1996, Amtrak planned to call this through service the "National Chief" with its own numbers (15/16), although the name and numbers were never used. Amtrak dropped the practice with the May 1998 timetable.

This route was mentioned amongst five others in the July 2010 issue of Trains magazine as slated for performance improvement, and as part of its federally mandated analysis of the worst-performing long-distance routes, Amtrak determined that reinstating a through-car connection with the Pennsylvanian would result in the highest gain in monetary and customer service measurements of possible options. To implement this, Amtrak had plans to operate a Viewliner sleeping car, an Amfleet cafe car and two Amfleet coaches between Chicago and New York via the Capitol Limited and Pennsylvanian, beginning sometime in 2011. Trains magazine picked up on this in their January 2011 issue, citing that a switch would be re-installed to give the thru-cars access to parallel track. Issues cited with providing such a service included a consist switch in Pittsburgh (shuffling sleeper and coach positions so that the transition sleeper was in the rear), an eight-hour layover on Sundays due to the Pennsylvanian's 1:20p departure (since eliminated), and a lack of Viewliner sleepers (delivery of new Viewliner II sleepers was delayed by several years).

== Former stops ==
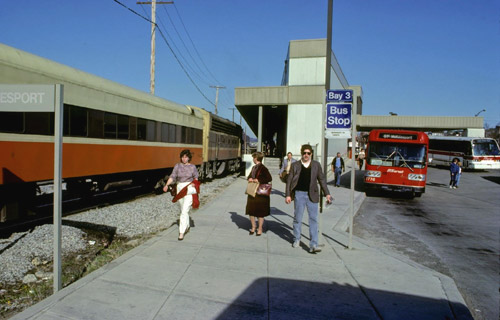
The PATrain at McKeesport, Pennsylvania in 1985. The Capitol Limited also used this station from 1982 to 1991.

The Capitol Limited's original routing west of Pittsburgh included Ohio stops in Canton, Crestline, and Lima; and Indiana stops in Fort Wayne, Valparaiso, and Gary. Amtrak dropped Gary as a station stop on April 28, 1985. On April 27, 1986, Amtrak added Warsaw, Indiana, located between Valparaiso and Fort Wayne. All these cities lost service when Amtrak re-routed the Capitol Limited north through Toledo on November 11, 1990. For a year, a dedicated bus connection was offered between Fort Wayne and Waterloo, Indiana.

Between March 2, 1982, and April 7, 1991, the Capitol Limited stopped in McKeesport, Pennsylvania, located in the Monongahela Valley southeast of Pittsburgh. At the time the Port Authority of Allegheny County operated the "PATrain" commuter rail between McKeesport and downtown Pittsburgh. The Port Authority ended the service in 1989, citing low ridership. Amtrak followed suit two years later, noting that on average one passenger boarded at McKeesport per trip during the train's final months of service at that station.

The Capitol Limited began stopping at Hammond–Whiting station upon its opening on September 12, 1982. Amtrak began reducing service to the station in the early 2000s because of low ridership and operational issues. The Capitol Limited ceased stopping there on July 9, 2001; it resumed around 2003, but ceased again on April 25, 2005.

== Route details ==
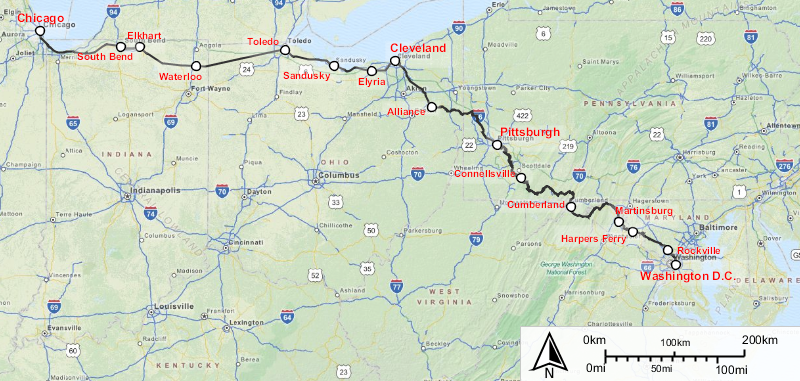
Route of the Capitol Limited

Between Washington and Pittsburgh, the Capitol Limited mostly followed the historic B&O route along narrow river valleys hemmed in by steep slopes, mainly the Potomac River from Washington to Cumberland, then Wills Creek to just before Meyersdale, and then the Youghiogheny River most of the way to Pittsburgh. Rail trails parallel much of this route, often on the opposite banks. The route straightens and levels out from Ohio onward.

Westbound trains left Washington before the afternoon rush and arrived in Chicago in the morning, while eastbound trains left Chicago in early evening and arrived in Washington in early afternoon.

The Capitol Limited operated over the following Amtrak, CSX Transportation, and Norfolk Southern Railway trackage:

- Amtrak Washington Union Station, part of the Northeast Corridor
- CSX Metropolitan Subdivision, Cumberland Subdivision, Cumberland Terminal Subdivision, Keystone Subdivision, Pittsburgh Subdivision, and P&W Subdivision, Washington to Pittsburgh
- NS Pittsburgh Line and Fort Wayne Line, Pittsburgh to Alliance
- NS Cleveland Line, Alliance to Cleveland
- NS Chicago Line, Cleveland to Chicago
- Amtrak Chicago Union Station

=== Stations ===
Amtrak Capitol Limited stations
State/Province	City	Station
District of Columbia	Washington	Washington Union
Maryland	Rockville	Rockville
West Virginia	Harpers Ferry	Harpers Ferry
West Virginia	Martinsburg	Martinsburg
Maryland	Cumberland	Cumberland
Pennsylvania	Connellsville	Connellsville
Pennsylvania	Pittsburgh	Pittsburgh
Ohio	Alliance	Alliance
Ohio	Cleveland	Cleveland
Ohio	Elyria	Elyria
Ohio	Sandusky	Sandusky
Ohio	Toledo	Toledo
Indiana	Waterloo	Waterloo
Indiana	Elkhart	Elkhart
Indiana	South Bend	South Bend
Illinois	Chicago	Chicago Union

== Equipment ==
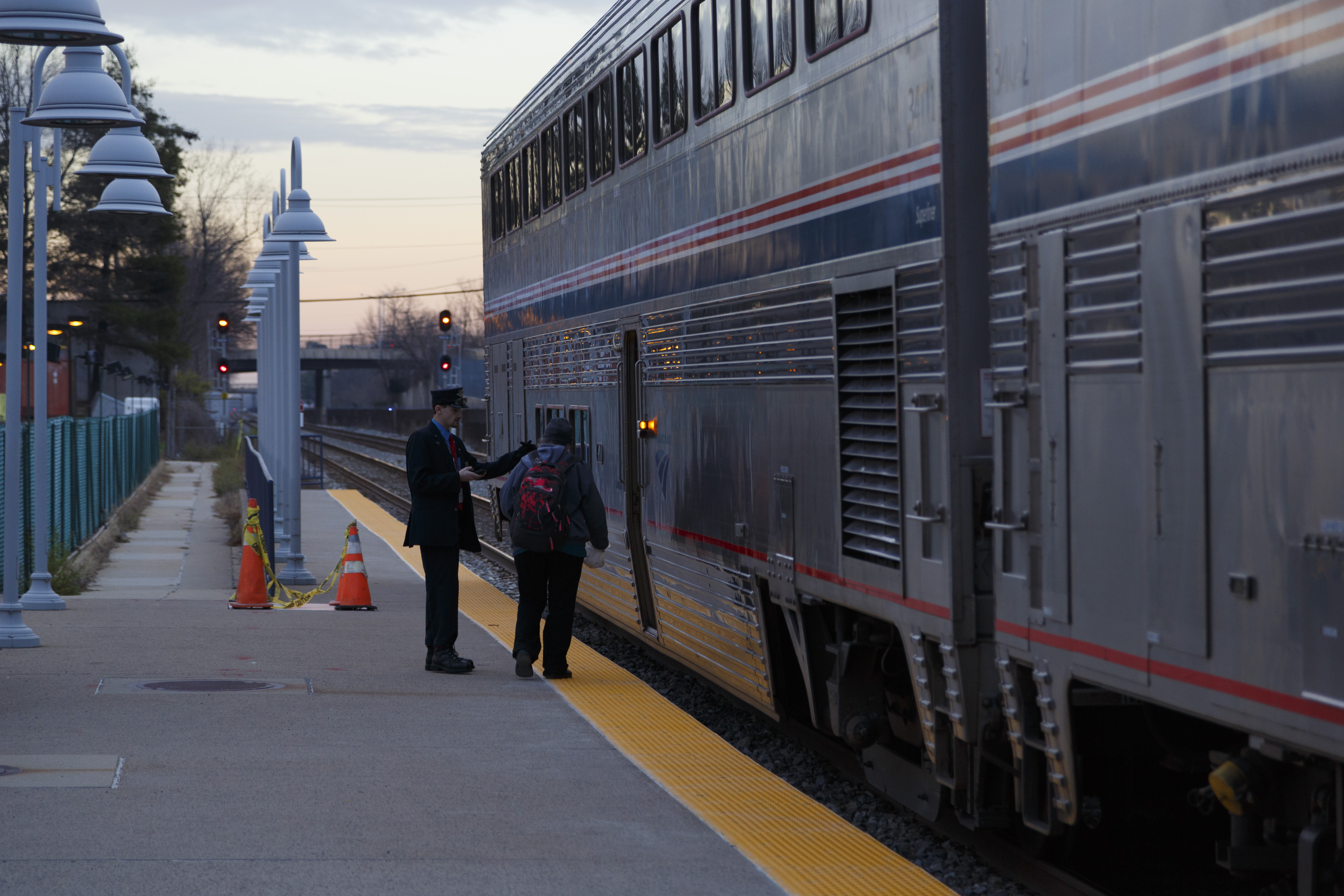
A typical Capitol Limited with Superliner cars

The Capitol Limited was one of two Amtrak services in the Eastern United States to operate with bilevel Superliner equipment, with the other being Auto Train. Pre-COVID, a typical Capitol Limited had 2 GE P40DC/P42DC locomotives, a Viewliner II baggage car, a Superliner transition sleeper, 2 Superliner sleepers, a Superliner dining car or diner-lounge, a Superliner Sightseer Lounge, and 3 Superliner coaches. The transition sleeper, Sightseer Lounge, and one coach were removed during pandemic cutbacks. One sleeper and a second coach were removed in early 2023 due to Superliner shortages resulting from the introduction of the Winter Park Express and the Canadian National Railway requiring the Illini and Saluki to operate with Superliners. Amtrak began replacing the older P40DC and P42DC locomotives with Siemens ALC-42 locomotives in 2023.
