= Elkhart station =

Train station in Indiana, United States

Elkhart, IN
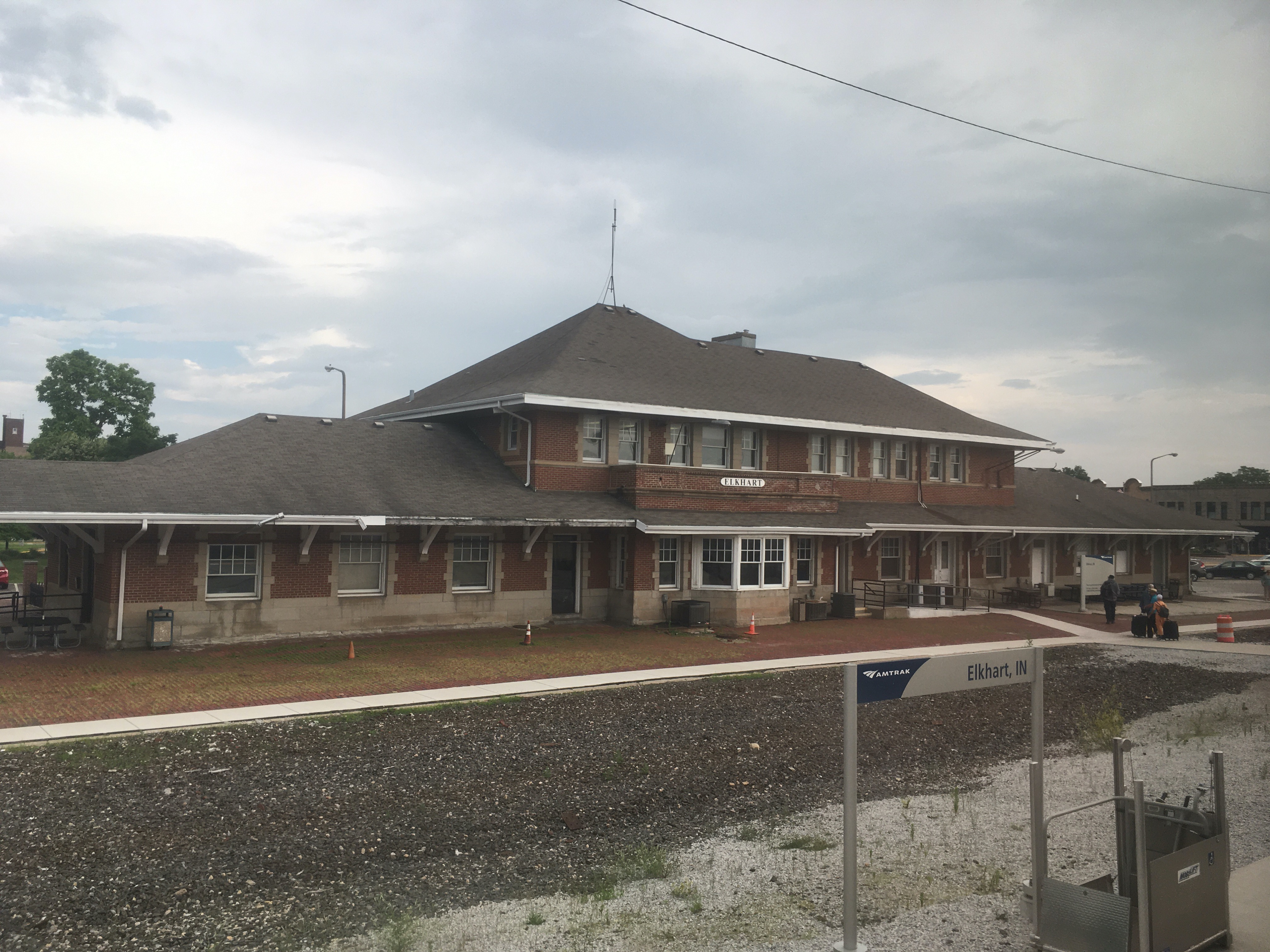
- Elkhart station in July 2019

General information
- Location: 131 Tyler Avenue; Elkhart, Indiana; United States
- Coordinates: 41.6806°N 85.9717°W
- Platforms: 1 side platform
- Tracks: 3
- Connections: Interurban Trolley

Construction
- Parking: Yes; free
- Accessible: Yes

Other information
- Station code: Amtrak: EKH

History
- Opened: 1900

Passengers
- FY 2025: 20,541 (Amtrak)

Services
Preceding station	Amtrak	Following station
South Bend toward Chicago	Floridian	Waterloo toward Miami
South Bend toward Chicago	Lake Shore Limited	Waterloo toward New York or Boston South
Former services
Preceding station	Amtrak	Following station
South Bend toward Chicago	Pennsylvanian 1998–2003	Waterloo toward Philadelphia
South Bend toward Chicago	Lake Shore 1971–1972	Toledo toward New York (Grand Central)
South Bend toward Chicago	Capitol Limited 1990–2024	Waterloo toward Washington, D.C.
Preceding station	New York Central Railroad	Following station
Osceola toward Chicago	Main Line	Goshen toward New York
Terminus	Kalamazoo Branch	Bristol toward Grand Rapids
Terminus	Old Road	Bristol toward Toledo
Location

Elkhart station is a train station in Elkhart, Indiana, served by Amtrak's Floridian between Chicago and Miami, and Lake Shore Limited between Chicago and New York City/Boston. While the station has a waiting room, it is only open in early mornings and late evenings, half an hour before the first westbound and eastbound train arrives. It does not have a ticket agent, but the station does have personnel that can assist riders upon departure and arrival. The station is directly across the tracks from the National New York Central Railroad Museum.

== History ==
Elkhart station was originally built in 1900 by the Lake Shore and Michigan Southern Railway and had a freight house installed across the tracks in 1907. The building is constructed of red brick trimmed with limestone, which is used for the window surrounds and belt course. The station was originally set amid a well-kept garden that displayed neat beds of colorful flowers and a row of trees along the tracks; this manicured landscape was not only a pretty introduction to the city for first time visitors, but it also buffered the streets of downtown from the noise and dirt associated with steam engines and freight trains. The station and the railroad were acquired by the New York Central Railroad in 1914. NYC merged with the Pennsylvania Railroad in 1968, and passenger service was taken over by Amtrak in 1971. The freight house became the National New York Central Railroad Museum in 1987.

On November 10, 2024, the Capitol Limited was merged with the Silver Star as the Floridian.
