= Bryan station (Ohio) =

Railroad station in Bryan, Ohio, US

Bryan, OH
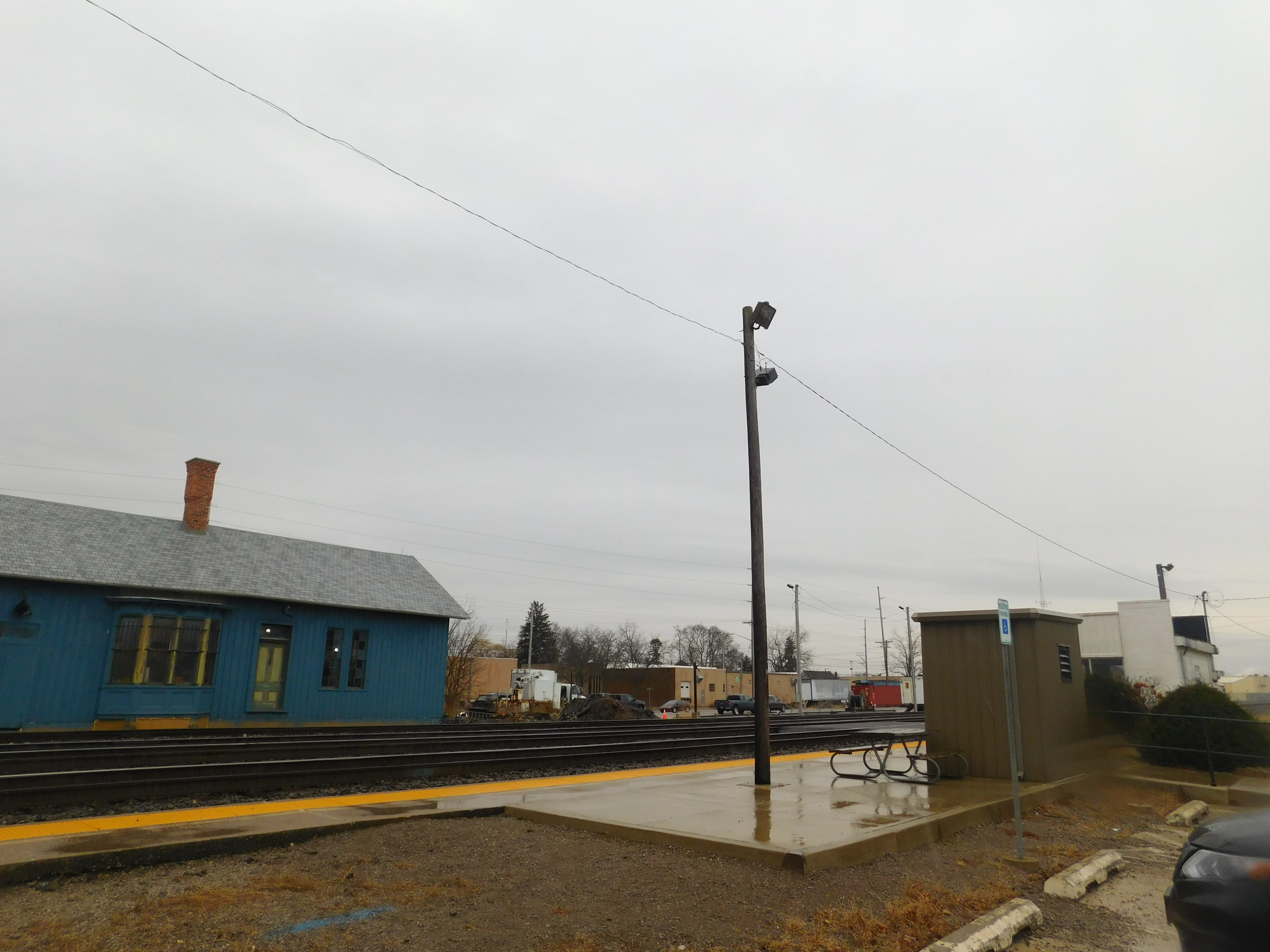
- Bryan station in January 2019

General information
- Location: Paige and Lynn Street; Bryan, Ohio; United States
- Coordinates: 41.4803°N 84.5517°W
- Owner: Amtrak, City of Bryan, Norfolk Southern Railway
- Platforms: 1 side platform
- Tracks: 3

Construction
- Parking: Yes
- Accessible: Yes

Other information
- Station code: Amtrak: BYN

History
- Opened: 1980

Passengers
- FY 2025: 5,306 (Amtrak)

Services
Preceding station	Amtrak	Following station
Waterloo toward Chicago	Lake Shore Limited	Toledo toward New York or Boston South
Floridian does not stop here
Former services
Preceding station	New York Central Railroad	Following station
Melbern toward Chicago	Main Line	Stryker toward New York
Pulaski toward Jackson	Cincinnati Northern Railroad	Ney toward Franklin
Location

Bryan station is an Amtrak train station located on the north side of downtown Bryan, Ohio. It is served by the Lake Shore Limited; the Floridian does not stop. The station has a single side platform and shelter on the north side of the four-track Chicago Line.

== History ==
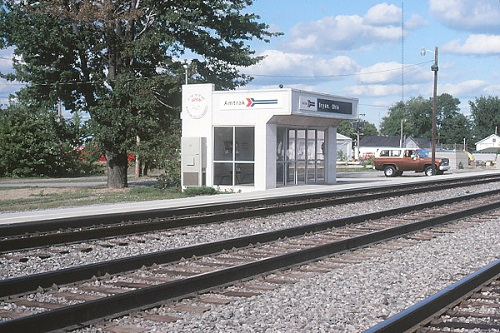
Bryan station in August 1982

Bryan was originally served by the Lake Shore and Michigan Southern Railway, later part of the New York Central Railroad. A wooden 19th-century station building constructed by the Lake Shore is still extant, as is a brick freight house constructed by the New York Central. A state historical marker next to the shelter commemorates the speed record set by the M-497 Black Beetle on July 23, 1966, which passed through Bryan.

Amtrak service at Bryan began in 1980, with a modernist passenger shelter constructed in the early 1980s. In 2020, Amtrak indicated plans for a renovation of the station for accessibility, then estimated to cost $3.3 million. Groundbreaking for the $5 million renovation took place in June 2024. It includes a 350-foot (110 m) accessible platform plus a station building with a waiting room and restrooms. Construction was expected to take 18 months.
