= Sandusky station =

Railway station in Sandusky, Ohio

Sandusky, OH
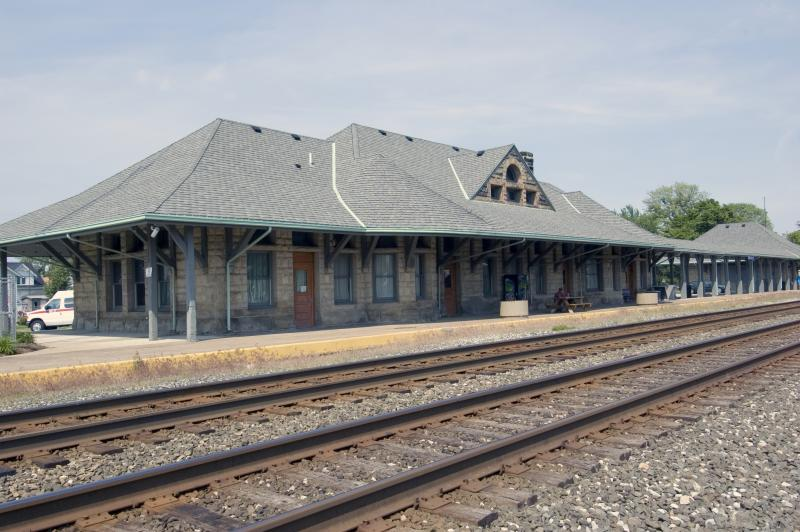

General information
- Location: 1200 North Depot Street; Sandusky, Ohio; United States
- Coordinates: 41°26′26″N 82°43′7″W
- Platforms: 1 side platform
- Tracks: 2
- Connections: Sandusky Transit System: Purple Line; GoBus: Grey Line

Construction
- Parking: Yes
- Accessible: Yes
- Architect: Shepley, Rutan and Coolidge
- Architectural style: Richardson

Other information
- Station code: Amtrak: SKY

History
- Opened: 1892 (NYC); July 29, 1979 (Amtrak)
- Closed: 1971

Passengers
- FY 2025: 10,442 (Amtrak)

Services
Preceding station	Amtrak	Following station
Toledo toward Chicago	Floridian	Elyria toward Miami
Toledo toward Chicago	Lake Shore Limited	Elyria toward New York or Boston South
Former services
Preceding station	Amtrak	Following station
Toledo toward Chicago	Pennsylvanian 1998–2003	Elyria toward Philadelphia
Toledo toward Chicago	Capitol Limited 1990–2024	Elyria toward Washington, D.C.
Preceding station	New York Central Railroad	Following station
Venice toward Chicago	Main Line	Huron toward New York
- Lake Shore And Michigan Southern Railroad Depot
- U.S. National Register of Historic Places
- Area: Less than 1 acre (0.4 ha)
- Built: 1891
- NRHP reference No.: 75001389
- Added to NRHP: July 17, 1975
Location
- Location within Ohio Location within the United States

Sandusky station is an Amtrak station in Sandusky, Ohio. Located at 1200 North Depot Street, the station consists of an uncovered platform on the north side of the east–west tracks, a small parking lot, and two buildings. The former Railway Express Agency/baggage building is boarded up, while the main building has a small, remodeled waiting room for Amtrak passengers as well as offices for the Sandusky Transit System and North Central EMS. The station is served by the Floridian and Lake Shore Limited routes, both of which pass through Sandusky in the middle of the night. Because the station has only one platform, eastbound trains switch to the usual westbound tracks to pass the station.

== History ==
The Sandusky station was originally built in 1892 by the Lake Shore and Michigan Southern Railway. It was designed by architects Shepley, Rutan & Coolidge and was also a work of A. Feick & Bros., and was listed on the National Register of Historic Places in 1975. In the heyday of passenger train travel in the first six decades of the 20th century the station was a local stop, bypassed by most New York Central named trains on the Chicago-New York City circuit. Exceptions were the Iroquois and the Chicagoan's eastbound trip. Additionally, the Cleveland-Detroit Cleveland Mercury made a stop at Sandusky. Passenger services ended in 1971, but were reinstated on July 29, 1979 when Amtrak added it as a stop on the Lake Shore Limited. On November 10, 2024, the Capitol Limited was merged with the Silver Star as the Floridian.
