= Lake Shore Limited =

American intercity passenger train service

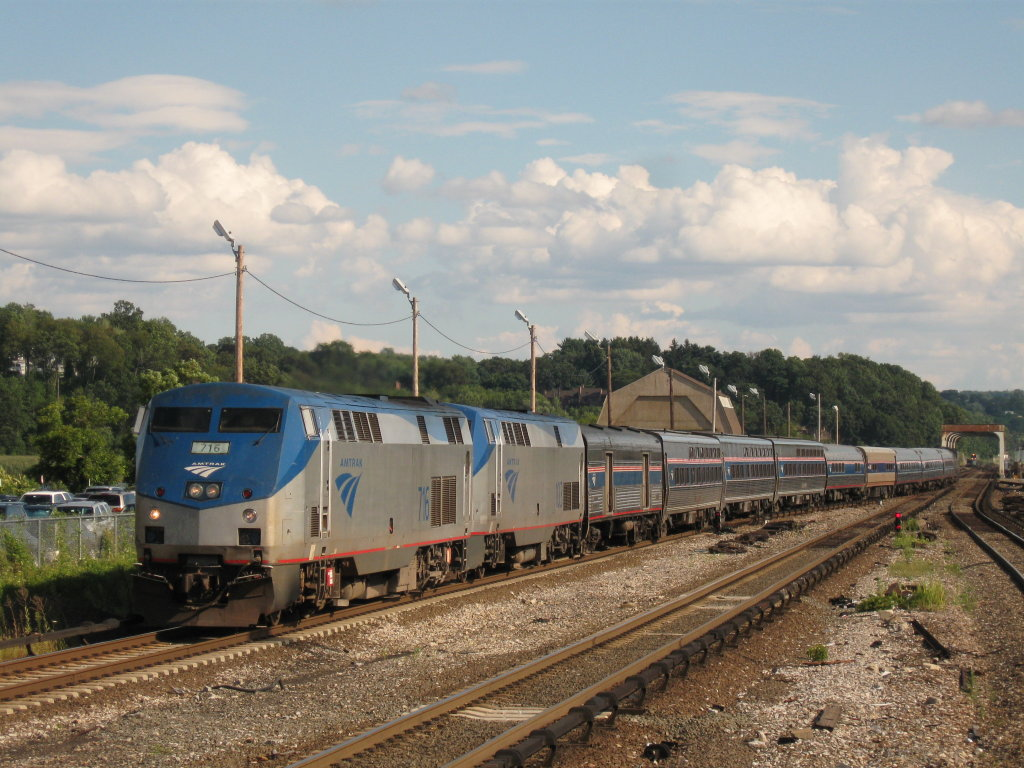
- The New York City section of the Lake Shore Limited entering Croton–Harmon station

Overview
- Service type: Inter-city rail
- Locale: Midwest and Northeast United States
- Predecessor: Lake Shore
- First service: October 31, 1975
- Current operator: Amtrak
- Ridership: 382,881 (FY 25) ▼ -3.9% (Note: Amtrak's Fiscal Year (FY) runs from October 1 of the prior year to September 30 of the named year.)

Route
- Termini: Chicago, Illinois; New York City; Boston, Massachusetts
- Stops: 20 (Chicago–New York); 22 (Chicago–Boston)
- Distance travelled: Chicago–New York: 959 miles (1,543 km); Chicago–Boston: 1,018 miles (1,638 km)
- Average journey time: Chicago–New York: 19 1/2–20 1/4 hours; Chicago–Boston: 21 1/2–22 hours
- Service frequency: Daily
- Train numbers: 48/448 (eastbound), 49/449 (westbound)

On-board services
- Classes: Coach Class; Sleeper Service
- Disabled access: All train cars, most stations
- Sleeping arrangements: Roomette (2 beds); Bedroom (2 beds); Bedroom Suite (4 beds); Accessible Bedroom (2 beds)
- Catering facilities: Dining car, Café
- Baggage facilities: Overhead racks, checked baggage available at selected stations

Technical
- Rolling stock: Amfleet passenger cars Viewliner passenger cars GE Genesis locomotives
- Track gauge: 4 ft 8 1/2 in (1,435 mm) standard gauge
- Electrification: Third rail, 750 V DC (New York area)
- Operating speed: 110 mph (180 km/h) (top); 46–50 mph (74–80 km/h) (avg)
- Track owners: MNRR, CSX, NS, MBTA, Amtrak

The Lake Shore Limited is an overnight passenger train operated by Amtrak between Chicago and the Northeastern United States, with sections to New York City and Boston. The central segment of the route runs along the southern shore of Lake Erie. East of Chicago, the Lake Shore Limited follows the former main line of the Lake Shore and Michigan Southern Railway to South Bend, Toledo, Cleveland, and Buffalo. From here the train takes the Empire Corridor through Rochester and Syracuse to Albany–Rensselaer station in Rensselaer, New York. At that station, the train divides, with one section continuing to Boston by way of Springfield, while the other continues along the Empire Corridor to New York City. The train is scheduled for 19 1/2–20 1/4 hours for the 959 miles (1,543 km) between Chicago and New York, and 21 1/2–22 hours for the 1,018 miles (1,638 km) between Chicago and Boston.

The train is descended from the New York Central Railroad's train of the same name, which operated on nearly the same Chicago–New York/Boston route from 1897 to 1956. Amtrak briefly revived the train as the Chicago–New York Lake Shore in 1971–72. The Lake Shore Limited was introduced as a Chicago–New York/Boston train in 1975. During fiscal year 2023, Lake Shore Limited carried 351,049 passengers.

== History ==
=== Prior service ===
The Lake Shore Limited is named after one of its predecessors that ran on the famed Water Level Route of the New York Central Railroad (NYC). Like the present day Lake Shore Limited, the NYC edition offered service between New York and Boston and Chicago, although the New York Central used LaSalle Street Station. The New York Central annulled the Lake Shore Limited in 1956 as part of a system-wide reorganization. Service over the Water Level Route continued until the formation of Amtrak, with the last route being the New England States and an unnamed Penn Central successor.

=== Lake Shore ===
Amtrak assumed operation of most intercity passenger trains in the United States on May 1, 1971, including those of Penn Central. Service west of Buffalo was not included in Amtrak's initial system map, and there was also no service between Albany and Boston. Chicago–New York traffic was handled by the Broadway Limited using the Pennsylvania Railroad's main line via Pittsburgh.

Just nine days later, on May 10, 1971, Amtrak debuted the Chicago–New York Lake Shore, using the "Water Level Route" of the New York Central's Lake Shore Limited. The 960-mile (1,540 km) daily service was scheduled for 17 hours 30 minutes and carried train numbers 60 and 61. The Lake Shore was the only train to serve Cleveland, which had been the largest city left out of the initial system. Amtrak introduced the route on the understanding that Ohio and New York would subsidize two-thirds of the cost of the train. The plan initially included a Michigan-funded connection between Toledo and Detroit, but this was cancelled due to poor track conditions.

The Lake Shore was the last long-haul train to use Cleveland Union Terminal, with the last departure occurring on December 31, 1971. Amtrak chafed at Union Terminal's high rent and the need to switch to electric locomotives to service Union Terminal's platforms. Additionally, the two daily trains did not even begin to justify a facility as large as Union Terminal. For the last week of the Lake Shore's runs Amtrak used a temporary platform west of Union Terminal near the Detroit–Superior Bridge to avoid incurring a year's fees ($250,000) for a week's use. Amtrak discontinued the train on January 6, 1972, after New York failed to meet its funding obligations.

=== Lake Shore Limited ===
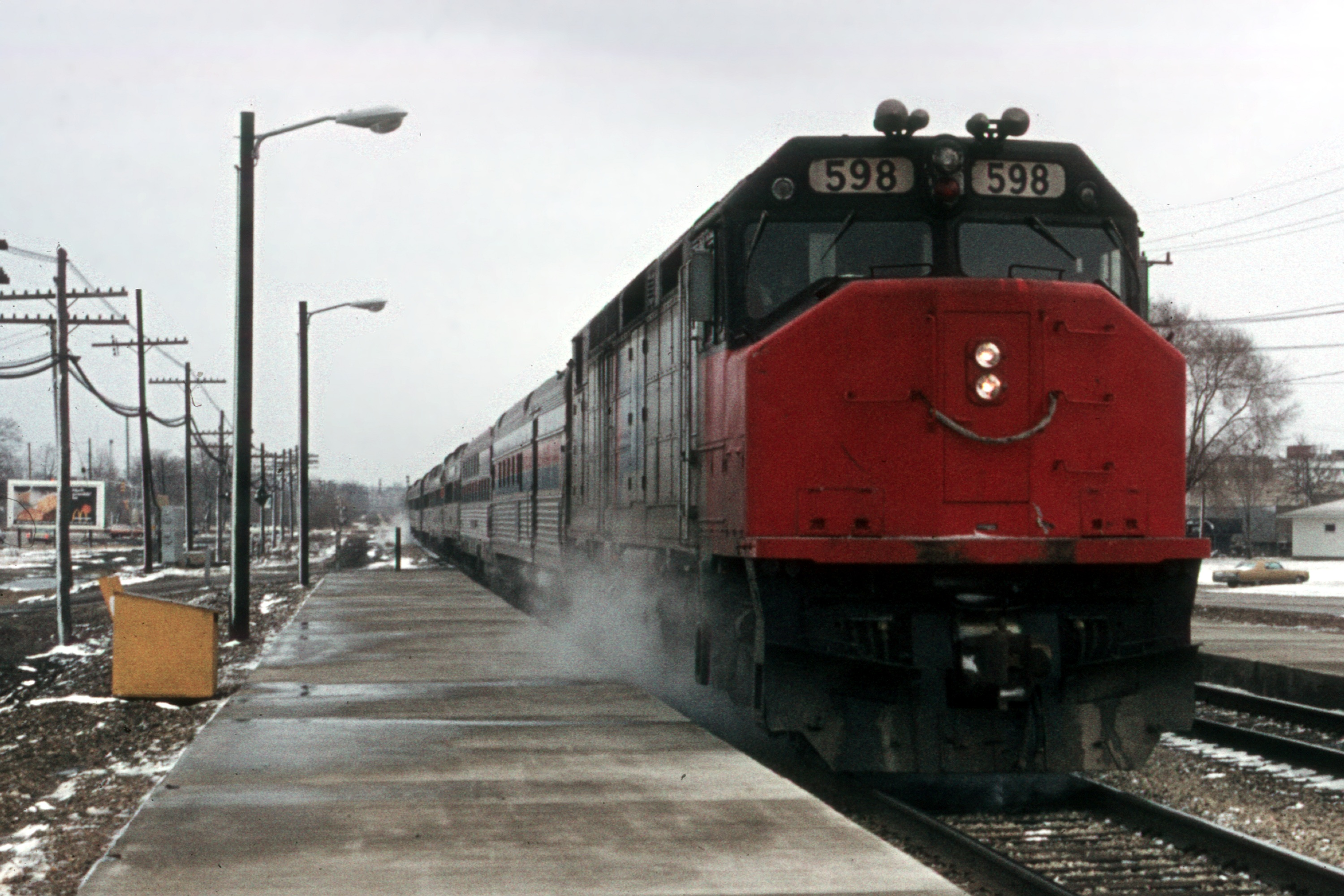
The Lake Shore Limited at South Bend in 1976

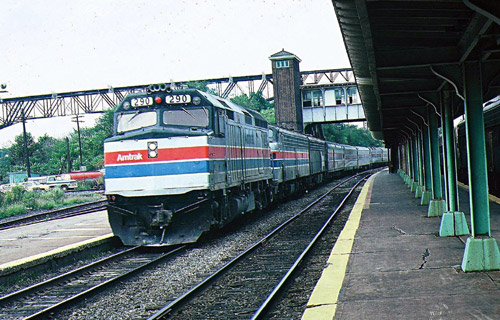
The New York City section of the Lake Shore Limited at Poughkeepsie in 1978

The present-day Lake Shore Limited began running October 31, 1975, with both New York and Boston sections. The westbound train served Cleveland during daytime hours, departing for Chicago 7:30 AM; eastbound passengers departed for New York City at 11:20 pm. Amtrak's October 1981 timetable pushed the westbound Cleveland departure to 12:35 AM.

On October 15, 1979, the Lake Shore Limited became the first Amtrak service to use rebuilt Heritage Fleet equipment with head end power. The Lake Shore Limited was the last train to use the decaying Buffalo Central Terminal, departing on October 28, 1979. Since then it has used Buffalo–Depew. Its New York terminus changed from Grand Central Terminal to Pennsylvania Station in 1991 following the opening of the Empire Connection.

On the night of August 3, 1994, around 3:45 am, the westbound Lake Shore Limited, with two locomotives and fifteen cars, and carrying roughly 320 passengers, and nineteen crew members, derailed on Conrail-owned tracks (now owned by CSX) near Batavia, New York. The initial derailment of the wheels of the third car on the train, occurred at milepost 403.7, and the train traveled for another three miles, until the general derailment of the train, at milepost 406.7. In all, fourteen cars derailed, with some sliding down an embankment, and 118 passengers and crew members were injured. However, there were no fatalities. The National Transportation Safety Board determined that the probable cause were the wheels coming off a section of flattened rail.

Low demand and cost-cutting led Amtrak to drop through service to Boston between 2003 and 2008; passengers made a cross-platform transfer to a shuttle train. Service to Poughkeepsie began on November 8, 2010. In 2010–11, Amtrak studied restoring the Hammond–Whiting station stop just east of the Illinois-Indiana border (which had been dropped in 2003), but ultimately did not restore it due to the difficulty of routing trains to the station's single platform.

Due to planned repair work on the Freedom Tunnel, Spuyten Duyvil Bridge, and Track 19 in New York's Penn Station, the New York section was discontinued from May 26 to September 3, 2018. Passengers traveling to New York City could transfer at Albany–Rensselaer to Empire Service trains, which operated into Grand Central Terminal during the outage.

In January 2019, Amtrak removed the baggage car from the Boston section of the train, thereby eliminating all checked baggage and bike service between Boston and Albany. The New York section retained its baggage car. From October 1, 2020, to May 31, 2021, daily service was reduced to three trains per week due to the COVID-19 pandemic.

A sinkhole under the Post Road Branch tracks in East Greenbush, New York, was discovered in May 2025, causing the Berkshire Flyer and Lake Shore Limited to be replaced with buses east of Albany. Service resumed on December 1, 2025.

==== Dining changes ====
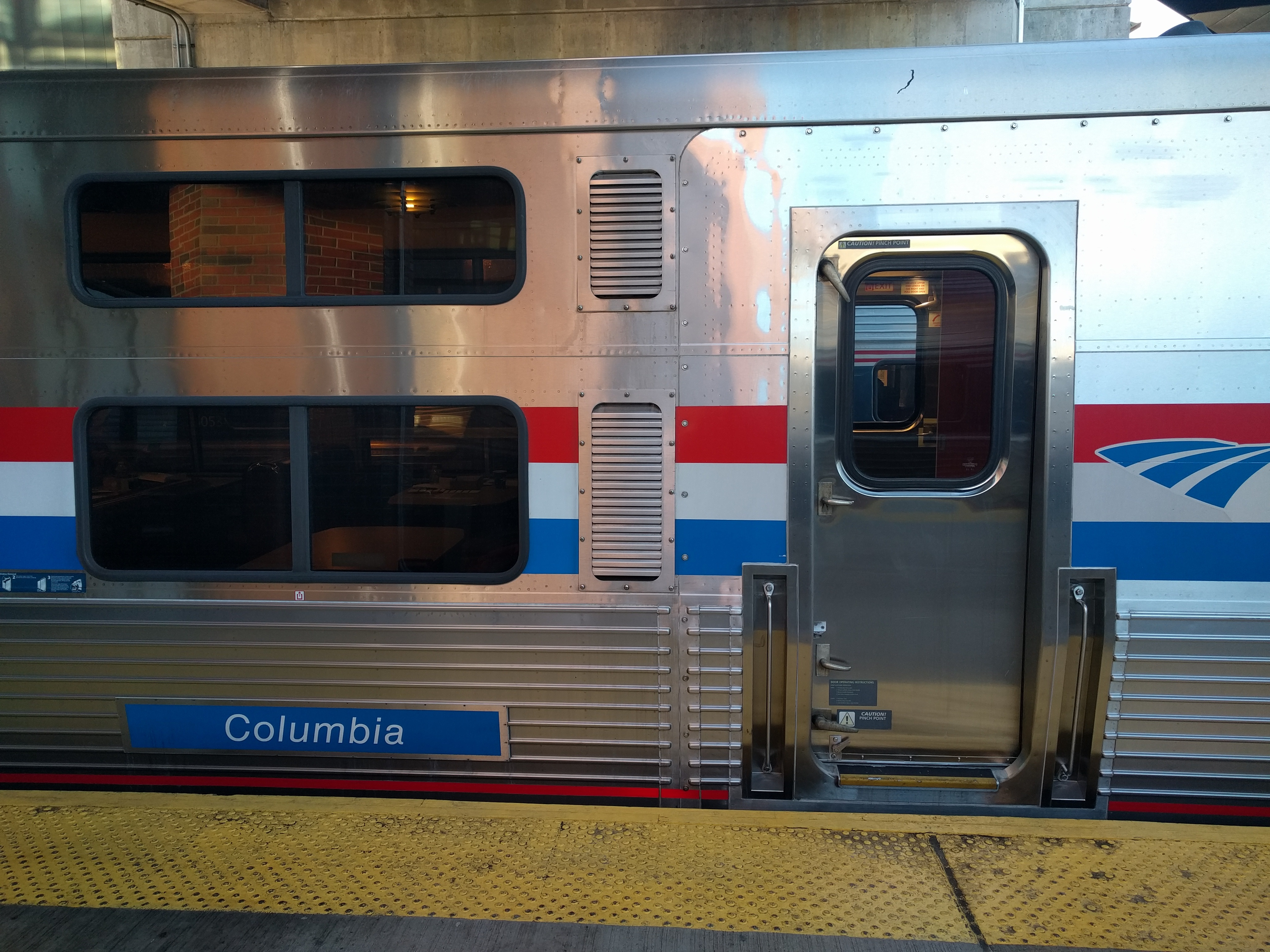
A Viewliner II diner on the train in 2019

During the 2000s and 2010s the Lake Shore Limited carried either a Horizon Fleet or Amfleet lounge car. Between November 2007 and December 2009, maintenance problems led Amtrak to withdraw the Heritage diners and substitute Amfleet Cafe-based diner-lites, a move that became a source of passenger displeasure and a liability for the route, as the Heritage cars could prepare fresh food on board. In July 2016, Amtrak once again replaced the Lake Shore's full-service dining car with an Amfleet II diner-lite. This was due to Heritage shortages, as well as a multi-year delay in delivery of the new CAF Viewliner II cars, including 25 diners.

In June 2018, Amtrak replaced the Amfleet II diner-lites with Viewliner II diners and adjusted the on board service by serving a selection of primarily-cold, exclusively pre-packaged boxed meals. The dining car is also now available as lounge space for sleeping car passengers even outside of meal times, but is closed to coach passengers. In January 2019, Amtrak significantly updated the boxed meal service to offer a full continental buffet at breakfast, and multiple hot entrées for lunch and dinner.

In October 2019, Amtrak again modified the on board dining service for sleeping car passengers by serving the pre-prepared meals on new reusable trays instead of in single use boxes to improve the meal presentation along with a refresh of the entree choices.

=== Possible future ===
Amtrak published its Performance Improvement Plan (PIP) for the Lake Shore Limited in September 2011. One idea was to change the train's eastbound departure time from Chicago to be earlier. It currently departs at 9:30 pm, to facilitate connections from often-late West Coast trains. The improved departure time would add $2 million in yearly revenue. Amtrak considered more radical changes to the operations of the Lake Shore Limited, including a re-route over the Chicago–Detroit Line to Dearborn, but rejected them. This would be the first full New York City to Chicago train via Michigan since the New York Central's Wolverine.

In the late 1990s, Amtrak considered adding an infill station at Dunkirk, New York, between Buffalo and Erie. Dunkirk was listed as a stop with service "to commence on a date to be announced" on several timetables, but the stop was never added. In 2021, Amtrak again proposed adding a station between Buffalo and Erie in Chautauqua County, New York, in either Dunkirk or Westfield. Plans moved forward in 2022 to study the exact placement of the stop.

== Operations ==
=== Route ===
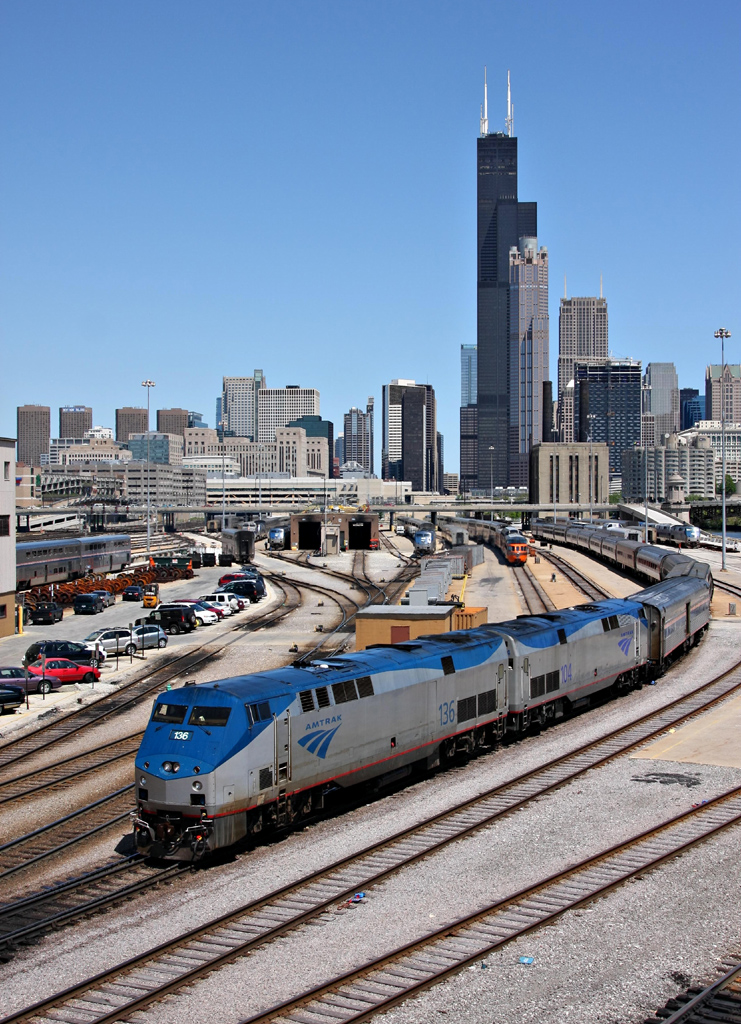
A Lake Shore Limited train backs into Union Station in Chicago, with the Willis Tower visible in the background.

The Lake Shore Limited consists of a New York section (train number 48 eastbound, 49 westbound) and a Boston section (448 eastbound, 449 westbound), which run combined between Chicago and Albany. The distance between Chicago and New York is 959 miles (1,543 km), while the distance between Chicago and Boston is 1,017 miles (1,637 km).

The train operates over the trackage of five railroad companies. From Chicago to Cleveland, the train rides the Chicago Line, which belongs to Norfolk Southern Railway, and is also used by Amtrak's Chicago-Miami train, the Floridian. From Cleveland to Hoffmans, the Lake Shore Limited rides on trackage belonging to the following CSX Transportation subdivisions: Cleveland Terminal, Erie West, Buffalo Terminal, Rochester, Syracuse Terminal, Mohawk, Selkirk, and Hudson.

The New York section operates on Metro-North Railroad's Hudson Line from Poughkeepsie to Spuyten Duyvil in the Bronx. Amtrak tracks are used twice: between Hoffmans and Poughkeepsie; and from the Bronx to Penn Station. The New York section only stops to discharge passengers southbound. Northbound trains only stop at Croton-Harmon and Poughkeepsie to receive passengers.

The Boston section runs on the trackage of several companies as well. The train travels on Amtrak's Post Road Branch from Rensselaer to nearby Schodack, from Schodack to Worcester on CSX's Berkshire and Boston subdivisions, and from Worcester to South Station on the Framingham/Worcester Line track owned and operated by the Massachusetts Bay Transportation Authority (MBTA). This section only stops eastbound to discharge passengers from Framingham eastward, while westbound trains only stop to receive passengers at Back Bay and Framingham.

There is a short distance of trackage between Hudson and Schenectady that allows for 110-mile-per-hour (177 km/h) operations. The Boston section is frequently delayed to the high amount of freight traffic on the single-track railroad between Albany and Worcester.

Lake Shore Limited route map

=== Stations ===
| State/Province | City | Station |
|---|---|---|
| Illinois | Chicago | Chicago Union |
| Indiana | South Bend | South Bend |
| Indiana | Elkhart | Elkhart |
| Indiana | Waterloo | Waterloo |
| Ohio | Bryan | Bryan |
| Ohio | Toledo | Toledo |
| Ohio | Sandusky | Sandusky |
| Ohio | Elyria | Elyria |
| Ohio | Cleveland | Cleveland |
| Pennsylvania | Erie | Erie |
| New York | Depew | Buffalo–Depew |
| New York | Rochester | Rochester |
| New York | Syracuse | Syracuse |
| New York | Utica | Utica |
| New York | Schenectady | Schenectady |
| New York | Rensselaer | Albany–Rensselaer |
| New York | Rhinecliff | Rhinecliff–Kingston |
| New York | Poughkeepsie | Poughkeepsie |
| New York | Croton-on-Hudson | Croton–Harmon |
| New York | New York | New York Penn |
| Massachusetts | Pittsfield | Pittsfield |
| Massachusetts | Springfield | Springfield |
| Massachusetts | Worcester | Worcester |
| Massachusetts | Framingham | Framingham |
| Massachusetts | Boston | Boston Back Bay |
| Massachusetts | Boston | Boston South |

=== Consist ===
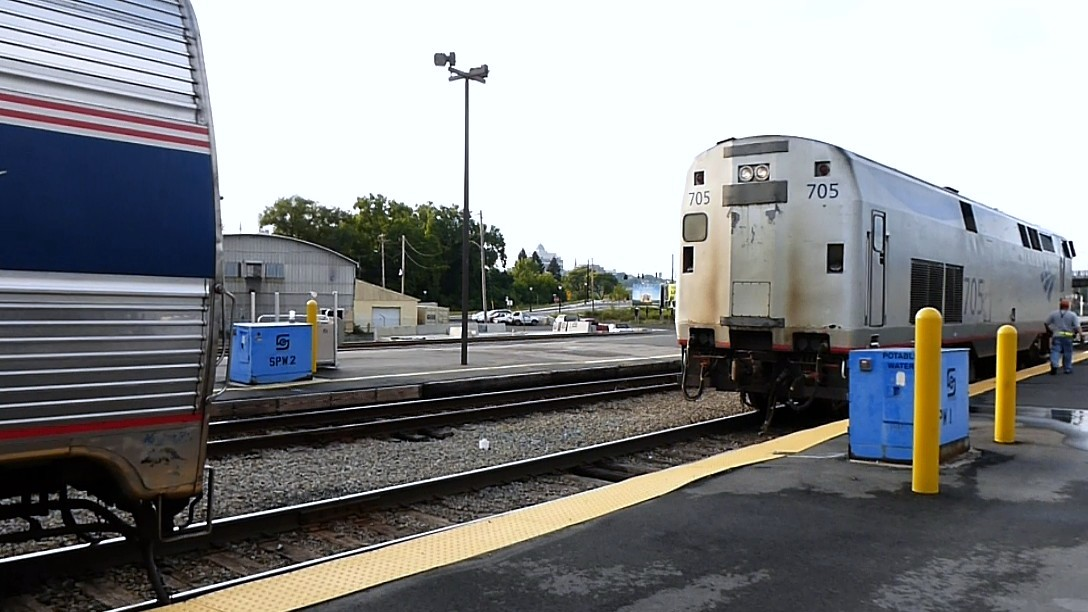
Train No. 49 is separated from the P32AC-DM at Albany–Rensselaer to prepare for coupling with Train No. 449 from Boston before heading to Chicago.

As of February 2019, the Lake Shore Limited typically has two P42DC locomotives (or one P32AC-DM locomotive between New York and Albany), one Viewliner baggage car, three Amfleet II coaches, one Amfleet I split Business/Cafe car, one Viewliner II diner (exclusively accessible to sleeper passengers), and three Viewliner Sleepers. As of August 2021, Viewliner II sleepers were expected to be added to the Lake Shore Limited that September.

In normal service, at Albany, the train splits into its Boston and New York sections. The New York section uses a single dual-mode P32AC-DM for third-rail power in Pennsylvania Station. West of Albany, traditional diesel-only GE Genesis locomotives are used.

=== Ridership ===
During fiscal year 2019, the Lake Shore Limited carried 357,682 passengers, an increase of 5.9% from FY2018. In FY2016, the train had a total revenue of $28,563,624, an increase of 0.2% over FY2015.

In FY 2010, only fifteen percent of passengers traveled between endpoints (Chicago and Boston or New York), although those travelers contributed 27 percent of ticket revenue. The remainder traveled to and from intermediate stations. According to Amtrak, passengers making connections in Chicago accounted for "a significant portion" of the Lake Shore Limited's ridership and revenues.
