= Elyria station =

Amtrak station in Ohio

Elyria, OH
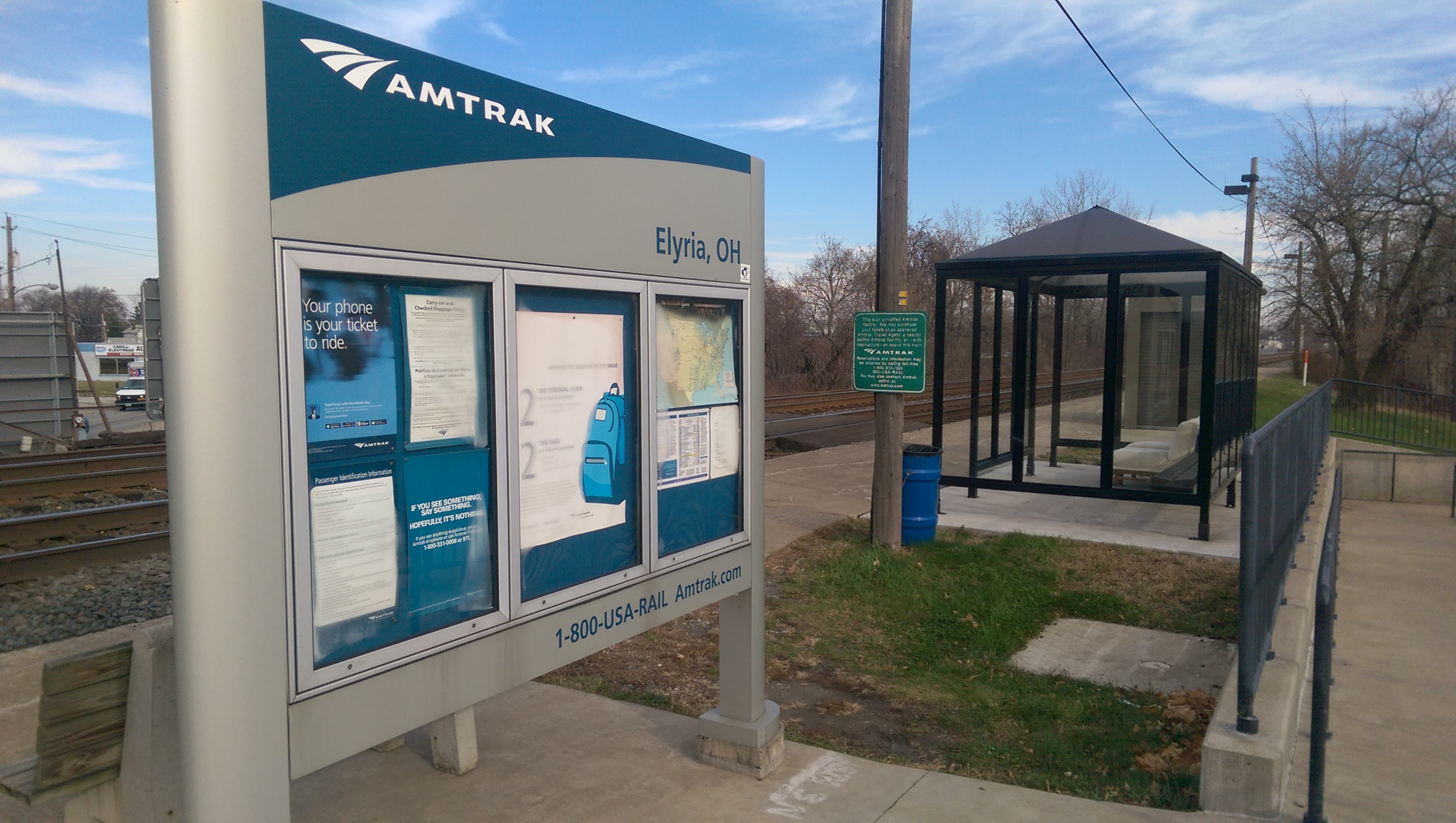
- The current, post-fire shelter and wheelchair-lift shed.

General information
- Location: 410 East River Road; Elyria, Ohio; United States
- Coordinates: 41.3701°N 82.0968°W
- Owner: Amtrak
- Line: NS Chicago Line
- Platforms: 1 side platform
- Tracks: 3

Construction
- Parking: Yes
- Accessible: Yes

Other information
- Station code: Amtrak: ELY

History
- Opened: October 31, 1975

Passengers
- FY 2025: 13,135 (Amtrak)

Services
Preceding station	Amtrak	Following station
Sandusky toward Chicago	Floridian	Cleveland toward Miami
Sandusky toward Chicago	Lake Shore Limited	Cleveland toward New York or Boston South
Former services
Preceding station	Amtrak	Following station
Sandusky toward Chicago	Pennsylvanian 1998–2003	Cleveland toward Philadelphia
Sandusky toward Chicago	Capitol Limited 1990–2024	Cleveland toward Washington, D.C.
Location
- Location within Ohio Location within the United States

Elyria station is an Amtrak station in Elyria, Ohio. Located at 410 East River Road, the building is a small bus stop-type shelter. Elyria is served by the Floridian and Lake Shore Limited routes, both of which pass through Elyria in the middle of the night.

== History ==
Starting in 1998 the Chicago-Philadelphia Pennsylvanian stopped in Elyria until 2003 when the train reverted the original Pittsburgh-New York route.

The former station is in downtown Elyria. It was built by the New York Central in 1925 as a replacement for a former Lake Shore and Michigan Southern Railway depot, and has been purchased by the Lorain County government for use as a transportation center. The building had been used for many years as a beauty school since it was sold by Conrail. The county hopes to use the building again for Amtrak trains. On August 1, 2013 it was announced that Amtrak has offered to pay $2.9 million towards the project in hopes of relocating its passenger service there.

On October 25, 2013, the East River Road station building caught fire, causing an estimated $25,000 in damage and closing the station building indefinitely, with passenger access limited to the platform.

On November 10, 2024, the Capitol Limited was merged with the Silver Star as the Floridian.
