= Waterloo station (Indiana) =

Train station in Waterloo, Indiana served by Amtrak

Waterloo, IN
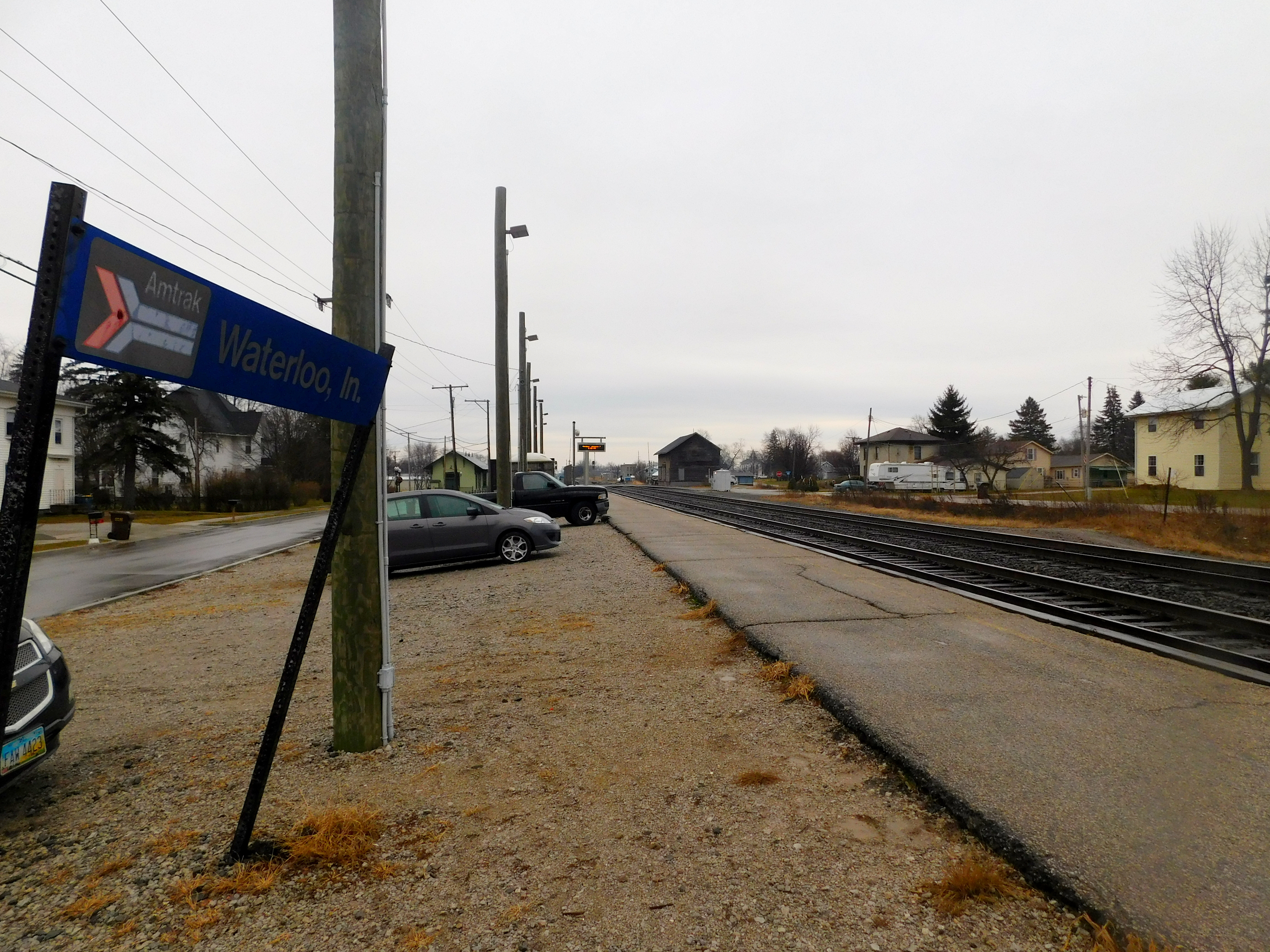
- Waterloo station platform in January 2019

General information
- Location: 485 West Van Vleek Street; Waterloo, Indiana; United States
- Coordinates: 41°25′54″N 85°1′30″W
- Owner: Town of Waterloo
- Line: Norfolk Southern Railroad
- Platforms: 1 side platform
- Tracks: 2

Construction
- Parking: 90 spaces
- Accessible: Yes

Other information
- Station code: Amtrak: WTI

History
- Opened: 1858; November 11, 1990
- Rebuilt: 1883; June 24, 2016

Passengers
- FY 2025: 21,178 (Amtrak)

Services
Preceding station	Amtrak	Following station
Elkhart toward Chicago	Floridian	Toledo toward Miami
Elkhart toward Chicago	Lake Shore Limited	Bryan toward New York or Boston South
Former services
Preceding station	Amtrak	Following station
Elkhart toward Chicago	Pennsylvanian 1998–2003	Toledo toward Philadelphia
Elkhart toward Chicago	Capitol Limited 1990–2024	Toledo toward Washington, D.C.
Preceding station	New York Central Railroad	Following station
Corunna toward Chicago	Main Line	Butler toward New York
Auburn toward Fort Wayne	Fort Wayne Branch	Summit toward Jackson
Location

Waterloo station is an Amtrak train station in Waterloo, Indiana. Waterloo is a small town of under 2,500 people; the station primarily serves the vastly larger population of Fort Wayne, which is some 25 miles (40 km) to the south. The station opened in 1990; in 2016, the former New York Central Railroad station building was moved and reopened for passenger use. The station has a waiting room and restroom facilities; it is open for only short periods before trains arrive.

== History ==
=== Early history ===
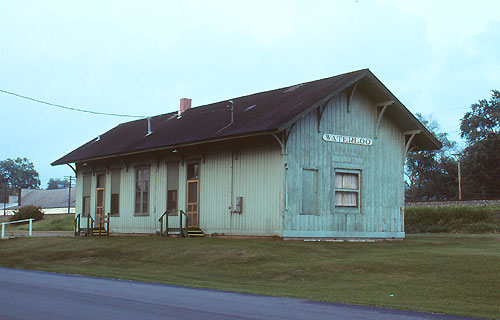
The then-unused station building in 1991, shortly after Amtrak service began

In 1858, the Michigan Southern and Northern Indiana Railroad completed its Northern Indiana Air Line from Toledo, Ohio to Elkhart, Indiana. A number of towns had been platted along the route, including Waterloo in 1856. The first passenger office for the town was merely a boxcar placed along the track.

In 1883, the Lake Shore and Michigan Southern Railroad built a new wooden depot, serving both the east-west Air Line and the north–south Fort Wayne and Jackson Railroad. By 1914, both lines were under control of the New York Central Railroad. A freight derailment in 1957 destroyed a trackside bay window. Passenger service on both lines was discontinued in the mid-20th century, and the north–south route was abandoned altogether.

The line passed to Penn Central in 1968 and Conrail in 1976. In 1984, the station building was moved 1,000 feet (300 m) east to protect it from Conrail's intentions to demolish it. The town renovated it as a community center.

=== Amtrak service ===
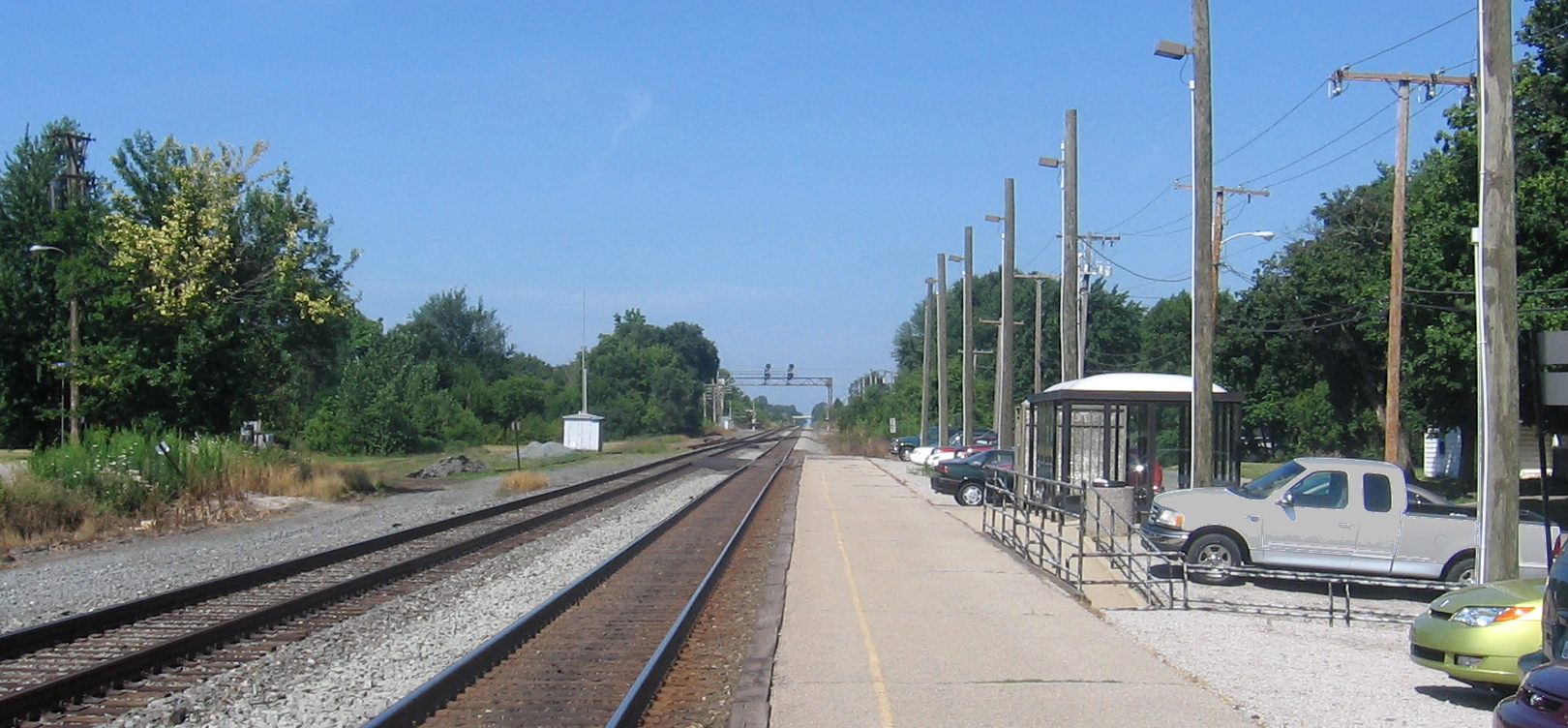
Platform at the 1990-opened Waterloo station in 2008

From May 1971 to January 1972, Amtrak operated the Lake Shore through Waterloo. The Lake Shore Limited resumed service on the route on October 31, 1975. Neither train stopped at Waterloo or the other small towns along the line.

On November 11, 1990, Amtrak rerouted the Capitol Limited and Broadway Limited off the former Pittsburgh, Fort Wayne and Chicago Railway so that Conrail could abandon the lightly used line. The Broadway Limited was rerouted onto a former Baltimore and Ohio Railroad line through Garrett, while the Capitol Limited was moved to the Lake Shore Limited route. The changes meant that Fort Wayne lost rail service, so stations were established in nearby small towns on the new routes; Waterloo station was opened with a single platform and a small plexiglass shelter. An Amtrak Thruway bus connection to Fort Wayne ran until April 2, 1994.

The Lake Shore Limited began stopping at Waterloo in 1995. The Pennsylvanian was extended to Chicago from November 7, 1998, to January 27, 2003, including a stop at Waterloo. On November 10, 2024, the Capitol Limited was merged with the Silver Star as the Floridian.

=== Renovations and relocation ===
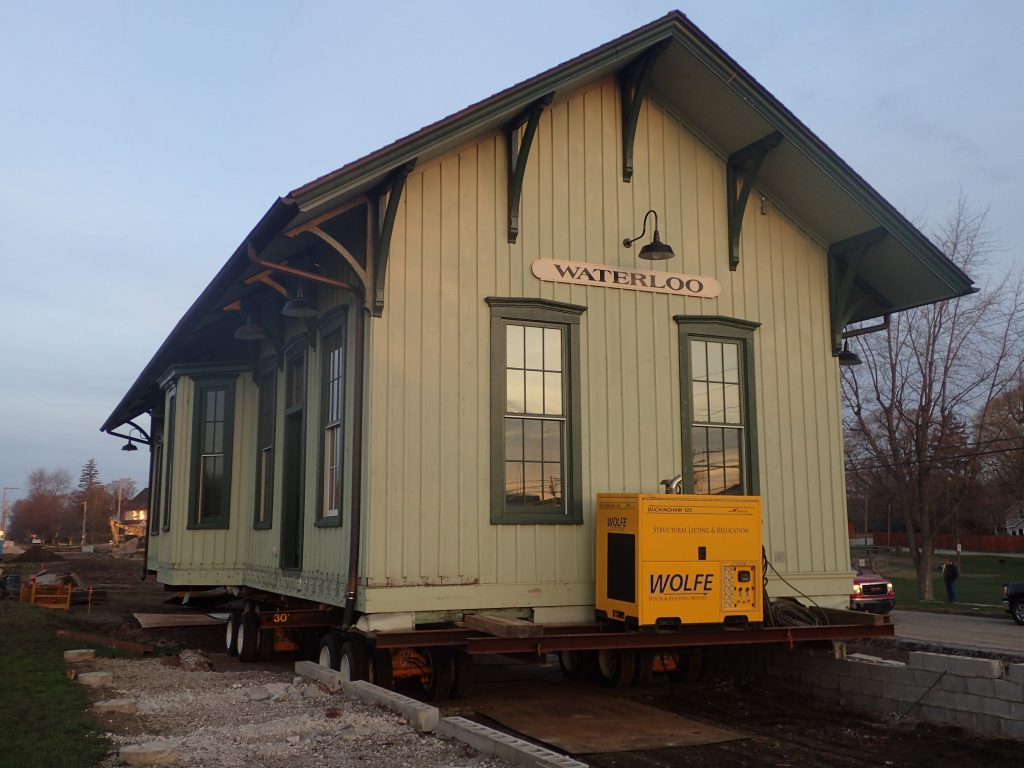
Waterloo Depot being relocated on March 30, 2016

The town received a $420k federal grant (supplemented with $153k in local match and $100k in other funds) in 2005 to renovate the station for rail use. The work included replacement of the roof, windows, and doors; installation of accessible restrooms, and repainting. The renovation was completed in September 2010.

In October 2010, the town of Waterloo received a $1.8 million federal TIGER grant to construct station improvements including a new platform, a canopy, lighting, and the incorporation of the restored building. The full-length platform would eliminate the need for the long Amtrak trains to double-stop at the station. However, Norfolk Southern (which owns and operates the line) was concerned about the platform location.

A second proposal was created to build a modern station building and platforms east of North Center Street, on the opposite side of the grade crossing from the existing station. This station was to cost $6 million, funded by the 2010 TIGER grant plus $4 million from Amtrak, and begin construction in early 2013 for a 2014 opening. Waterloo accepted the agreement in June 2012, but the 2013 budget sequestration reduced Amtrak's available funds and the project was canceled.

In early 2015, the town began a smaller project funded by the original TIGER grant, which included additional lighting and walkways, a new parking lot, and electronic signage. On March 30, 2016, the station building was moved 700 feet (210 m) west, adjacent to Center Street. The move provides Amtrak passengers with a more permanent facility. On June 24, 2016, the station building was reopened for passenger use.
