= New England States =

American named passenger train (1938–1967)

Overview
- Service type: Inter-city rail
- Status: Discontinued
- Locale: Midwest United States/New England
- First service: June 15, 1938
- Last service: December 3, 1967
- Successor: Eventually Amtrak's Lake Shore Limited
- Former operator: New York Central Railroad

Route
- Termini: South Station; LaSalle Street Station
- Distance travelled: 1,018 miles (1,638 km)
- Average journey time: 19 hours
- Service frequency: Daily
- Train number: 27/28
- Line used: Water Level Route

On-board services
- Seating arrangements: Reclining seat coaches
- Sleeping arrangements: Conventional roomettes and double bedrooms; slumbercoach roomettes and double bedrooms (1965)
- Catering facilities: dining service
- Observation facilities: Lounge car
Route map

The New England States was a passenger train operated by the New York Central Railroad and its successor Penn Central over the Water Level Route (predominantly alongside rivers and lake shores) between Chicago and Boston. It was launched in 1938, in tandem with the relaunch of the newly-streamlined 20th Century Limited, and assumed responsibility for that train's Boston sleepers. In 1949 it became the first Chicago–Boston streamliner. The New York Central dropped the name in 1967; an unnamed remnant continued running until 1971. Amtrak's Lake Shore Limited now serves the route.

== History ==
The New York Central introduced the New England States on June 15, 1938, coinciding with the relaunch of the 20th Century Limited. The New England States was an all-Pullman train which ran from Chicago to Boston via Toledo and Albany. With the launch of the New England States, the Twentieth Century Limited ceased carrying sleepers for Boston, which had to be switched in and out at Albany. In 1949, the New York Central purchased new streamlined equipment from the Budd Company for the train at a cost of $3.5 million. Once so-equipped, the New England States became the first Chicago–Boston streamlined train.

Following the Second World War, the New England States gradually diminished along with the rest of the New York Central's passenger fleet. The train lost its all-sleeper status in the summer of 1949 with the addition of coaches; the New York Central withdrew its observation car in 1956. In 1954, a typical eastbound train carried Chicago-Boston and Chicago-Buffalo sleepers, while its westbound counterpart carried Boston-Chicago sleepers and a Boston-Pittsburgh sleeper which it dropped-off for the Pittsburgh-Buffalo Express in Buffalo. "Sleepercoaches", economy sleepers known elsewhere as Slumbercoaches, were added in 1959. The New York Central consolidated the eastbound New England States and the Pacemaker, a Chicago-New York train, on April 30, 1961. On November 5, 1967, the New York Central consolidated the New England States and Twentieth Century Limited west of Buffalo: a precursor to the latter's discontinuance on December 3, 1967. In a major restructuring of passenger services the following day, December 3, the New England States lost its name (becoming known just by its numbers, 27/28) and began running with a mixed consist of coaches and sleepers between Chicago and New York/Boston.

The New York Central merged with its long-time rival, the Pennsylvania Railroad, on February 1, 1968, to become the Penn Central. On March 10, 1970, the Penn Central petitioned to end the former New England States, along with all other trains on its route. The passage of the Rail Passenger Service Act interrupted these proceedings, and the former New England States remained running until the start of Amtrak on May 1, 1971, when it was discontinued. Amtrak revived direct Chicago–Boston service in 1975 with a section of the Lake Shore Limited, which continues to provide service over the route.
