= Adam Hollingsworth =

American businessman

- Education: University of Alabama (BA)
- Occupation: Chief of Staff to Florida Governor Rick Scott
- Employer(s): CSX Corporation (1995-2000 and 2002-2004); APCO Worldwide (2000-2001); Parallel Infrastructure Florida politicians: Charles Bennett, Corrine Brown, Ed Austin, and John Peyton
- Spouse: Amy Carrier

Adam Hollingsworth is an American politician and business executive. He was the Chief of Staff to Florida Governor Rick Scott. Hollingsworth previously served as Chief of Staff to former Jacksonville, Florida Mayor John Peyton and is a former executive for CSX Corp.

== Career ==
Immediately before he was appointment Chief of Staff to Governor Scott, Hollingworth served as CEO of Parallel Infrastructure, a division of Flagler Development. Flagler, a real estate development company, owns some 19,000 acres of property and more than 50 office and industrial buildings in Jacksonville, Orlando, Fort Lauderdale, and Miami. Its parent company, Fortress Investment Group, also owns Florida East Coast Railway, which provides freight service on tracks running through coastal communities from Jacksonville to Miami. In 2014, a related company, All Aboard Florida (parent company: Florida East Coast Industries), attempted to secure a $1.6 billion federal government loan to finance the development of Brightline, a higher-speed passenger train service between Orlando and Miami on these tracks. This plan, which entails the state of Florida financing the construction of a new $213 million transportation center at the Orlando airport to house the terminus of the rail service, is subject to widespread opposition by local governments in communities north of Palm Beach County where it will pass through but not provide service. The fact that Hollingsworth was previously connected with Flagler and is now the governor's "right-hand man" has raised concern over possible conflicts of interest in the All Aboard Florida plan.

Hollingsworth worked for CSX from May 1995-May 2000 and from February 2002-September 2004. He was vice president of APCO Worldwide from 2000-2001.

On December 10, 2013, under pressure from journalists, Hollingsworth released a statement to the Miami Herald and Tampa Bay Times that he had lied in his 2011 application for membership in the board of Enterprise Florida Inc., the State of Florida's public-private economic development agency. On his application, he claimed that he graduated from the University of Alabama with a BA in Communications in 1990, when in reality, he didn't obtain the degree until 2009.

Hollingsworth has worked for the following Florida politicians: Charles Bennett, Corrine Brown, Ed Austin, and John Peyton.

== Personal life ==
Hollingsworth is married to Amy Carrier, who was previously a Republican operative and CSX executive. They have two children.
