= Boca Raton station (Brightline) =

Brightline train station

Boca Raton
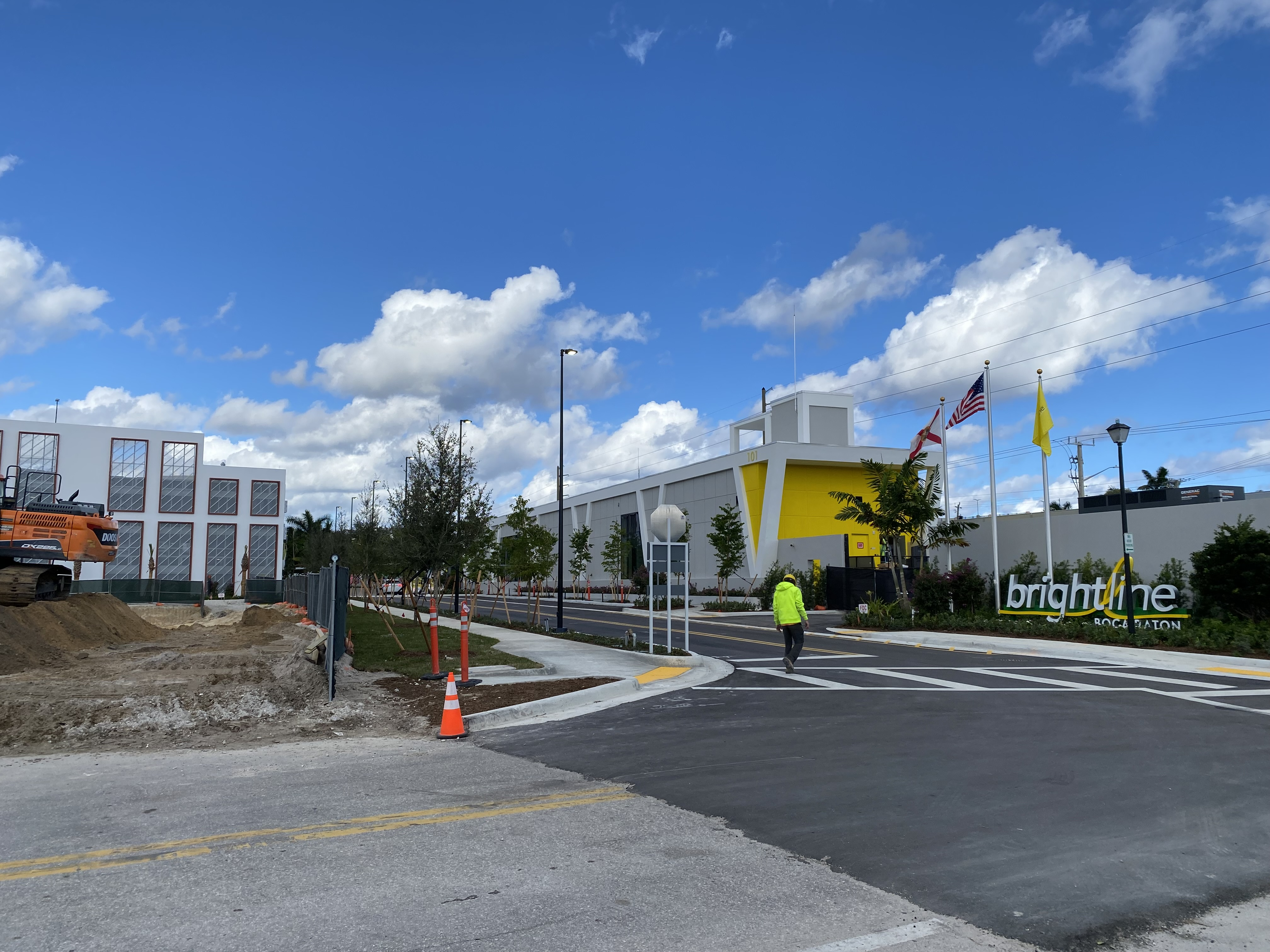

General information
- Location: 101 NW 4th Street; Boca Raton, Florida; United States
- Coordinates: 26.354617°N 80.087385°W
- Owner: City of Boca Raton
- Operator: Brightline
- Line: Florida East Coast Railway
- Platforms: 1 side platform
- Tracks: 1
- Connections: Palm Tran: 1, 94

Construction
- Structure type: At-grade
- Parking: On-site parking garage; paid
- Cycle facilities: Racks
- Accessible: Yes

History
- Opened: December 21, 2022

Services
Preceding station	Brightline	Following station
West Palm Beach toward Orlando	Brightline	Fort Lauderdale toward MiamiCentral
Location

Boca Raton station is an inter-city rail station in Boca Raton, Florida. It is served by Brightline (which codes the station as BOC in routing), on their line from Miami to Orlando. The station is located near Mizner Park, right next to the Boca Raton Public Library, and is 22,000 sq ft (2,000 m^{2}) on a 1.8-acre site. It was opened on December 21, 2022.

== History ==
In 2019, Mayor Scott Singer of Boca Raton pitched the idea to Brightline about adding a station in Boca Raton because of its key market. Brightline considered the opportunity and decided to send a letter to the city of Boca Raton about the possibility of adding their city as an infill station along the Florida route. Brightline proposed constructing the station and rail infrastructure while the city would cover access and zoning requirements and costs. In December 2019, the Boca Raton City Council approved the station site, which was a former community garden next to the Boca Raton Public Library.

In September 2020, the city was awarded a $16 million grant from the United States Department of Transportation to be used toward the construction of the station and related infrastructure. A portion of the grant would fund the construction of a 455-car parking garage that accommodates both Brightline passengers and patrons of the neighboring public library. Construction of the garage commenced in December 2021 and was completed in the fourth quarter of 2022. Construction of the actual station itself commenced on January 25, 2022, accompanied by an official groundbreaking ceremony hosted by Brightline's president, Patrick Goddard. A ribbon-cutting ceremony was held a day before the station's opening date, and it opened to the public on December 21, 2022, taking less than a year to complete the station.

== See also ==
- Boca Raton station (Tri-Rail)
