= West Palm Beach station (Brightline) =

Brightline train station

West Palm Beach
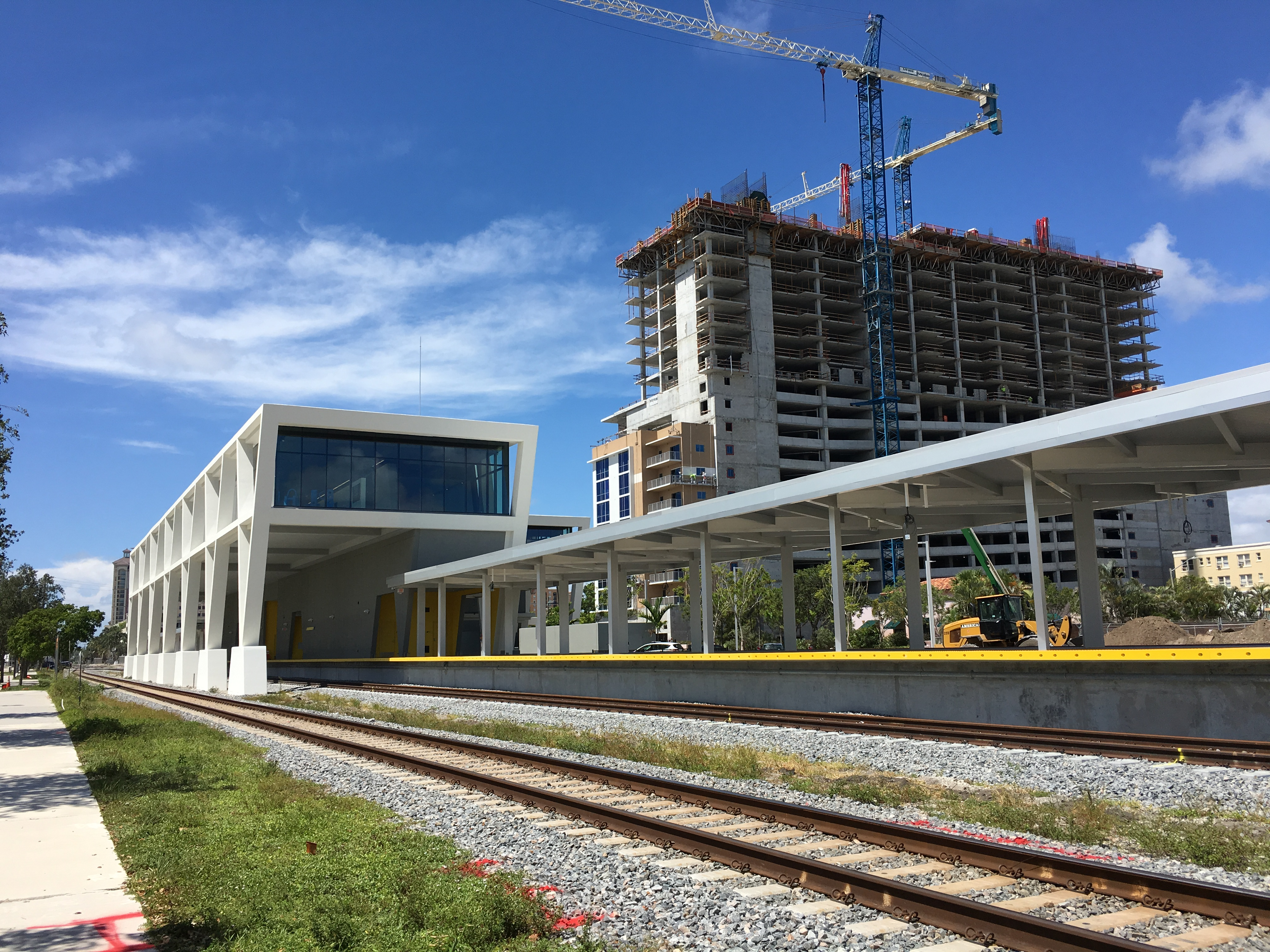
- The station in July 2017

General information
- Location: 501 Evernia Street; West Palm Beach, Florida; United States
- Coordinates: 26.71182°N 80.05556°W
- Owner: Florida East Coast Industries
- Operator: Brightline
- Platforms: 1 Island platform
- Tracks: 2
- Connections: Palm Tran: 1, 40

Construction
- Structure type: At-grade
- Parking: On-site parking garage; paid
- Cycle facilities: Racks
- Accessible: Yes

History
- Opened: January 13, 2018

Services
Preceding station	Brightline	Following station
Orlando Terminus	Brightline	Boca Raton toward MiamiCentral
Proposed services
Preceding station	Tri-Rail	Following station
Gregory Road toward Fort Lauderdale	Green Line (proposed)	45th Street toward Toney Penna
Location

West Palm Beach station is an inter-city rail station in West Palm Beach, Florida. It is served by Brightline, coded as WPB in routing, connecting West Palm Beach to Downtown Miami and Orlando International Airport. The station is located in downtown West Palm Beach, on Evernia Street between Rosemary Avenue and Quadrille Boulevard. This is about half a mile east of Amtrak and Tri-Rail's West Palm Beach station and half a mile south of the older Florida East Coast Railway station that operated on the same tracks in the first half of the 1900s, next to where Quadrille Boulevard turns south after crossing the Flagler Memorial Bridge.

== History ==
The station is a Modern style structure with illuminated V-shaped columns supporting the upper concourse echoing the designs of the Miami and Fort Lauderdale stations also under construction on the line. It was planned and designed by Skidmore, Owings & Merrill in association with Zyscovich Architects. It was completed in late 2017.

Foundation pouring at the site to construct the $29 million station occurred in early 2016. In March 2016 the raising of the 18 V-shaped pillars began. Earlier in the month, a 130-foot (39-meter) crane toppled over at the site with no injuries.

Brightline launched its first passenger service in January 2018 with several daily trains to Fort Lauderdale. Future plans include extending the service to other stations.

== Tri-Rail Coastal Link ==
The South Florida Regional Transportation Authority, which operates the Tri-Rail commuter train, proposed the construction of a Downtown West Palm Beach station (also planned as Evernia Street station) co-located with the current station. This station would be served by the Green Line, which would operate from Broward Boulevard to Toney Penna station in Jupiter.
