= North East Corridor =

North East Corridor may refer to:

- The Northeast Corridor in the United States
- The North East Corridor (Spain) in Spain
- The Northeast Corridor Line of New Jersey Transit
- Northeast Corridor Rapid Transit Project in Miami, Florida
- Northeast Corridor: Steely Dan Live!, a 2021 live album by Steely Dan
