= Aventura station =

Brightline train station

Aventura
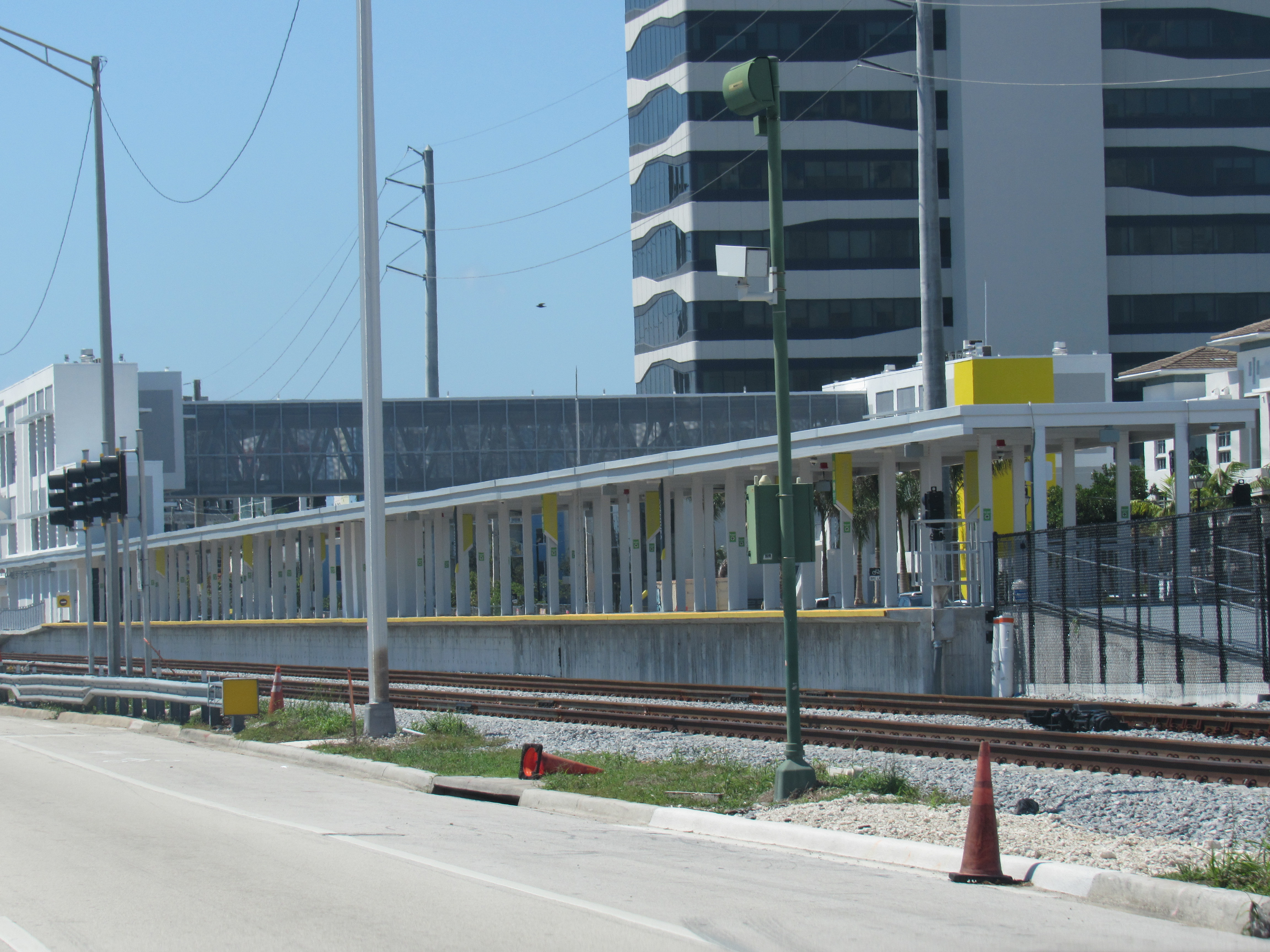
- Aventura station in April 2023

General information
- Location: 19796 West Dixie Highway; Ojus, Florida; United States
- Coordinates: 25.957455°N 80.147407°W
- Owner: Miami-Dade County
- Operator: Brightline
- Line: Florida East Coast Railway
- Platforms: 1 island platform
- Tracks: 2
- Connections: Brightline+ to Aventura Mall; Metrobus: 183

Construction
- Structure type: At-grade
- Parking: Yes; paid
- Cycle facilities: Racks
- Accessible: Yes

History
- Opened: December 24, 2022

Services
Preceding station	Brightline	Following station
Fort Lauderdale toward Orlando	Brightline	MiamiCentral Terminus
Location

Aventura station is a Brightline station in Ojus, Florida. It is located on West Dixie Highway, west of the Aventura Mall and the city of Aventura.

Inter-city service is provided to MiamiCentral in about 17 minutes, and trains run as far north as Orlando.

== Description ==
The station is 34,000 square feet (3,200 m^{2}) on a 3-acre (1.2 ha) site. There are 240 parking spaces at the Aventura station, as well as a Miami-Dade Transit bus drop-off. Complimentary shuttle service is available to and from the mall. Brightline will also be constructing a pedestrian bridge linking the platform to the Aventura Mall directly across Biscayne Boulevard.

The infill station is expected in the future to serve as the terminus of planned commuter rail services in Miami-Dade County and Broward County. The Miami-Dade Northeast Corridor Rapid Transit Project line would run between Aventura and MiamiCentral, and the Broward line would operate as far north as Deerfield Beach.

== History ==
The station is built on land purchased by Brightline (then known as Virgin Trains USA) and donated to Miami-Dade County, which funded a portion of the construction with $76 million. A groundbreaking ceremony was held September 3, 2020. Prior to Brightline's ongoing suspension of service due to the COVID-19 pandemic, the station had been expected to open in the fall of 2021. A ribbon-cutting ceremony was held on December 20, 2022. Despite a scheduled opening date of December 21, 2022, passenger service did not begin until a few days later, on December 24, 2022, due to some last-minute finishing touches to the station.

In July 2025, it was announced that construction on the pedestrian bridge between the station and the Aventura Mall directly across Biscayne Boulevard would commence later that summer or in the early fall, eliminating the need for passengers to walk over 1 mile (1.6 km) between the two or call a taxicab.
