= Fort Lauderdale station (Brightline) =

Brightline train station

Fort Lauderdale
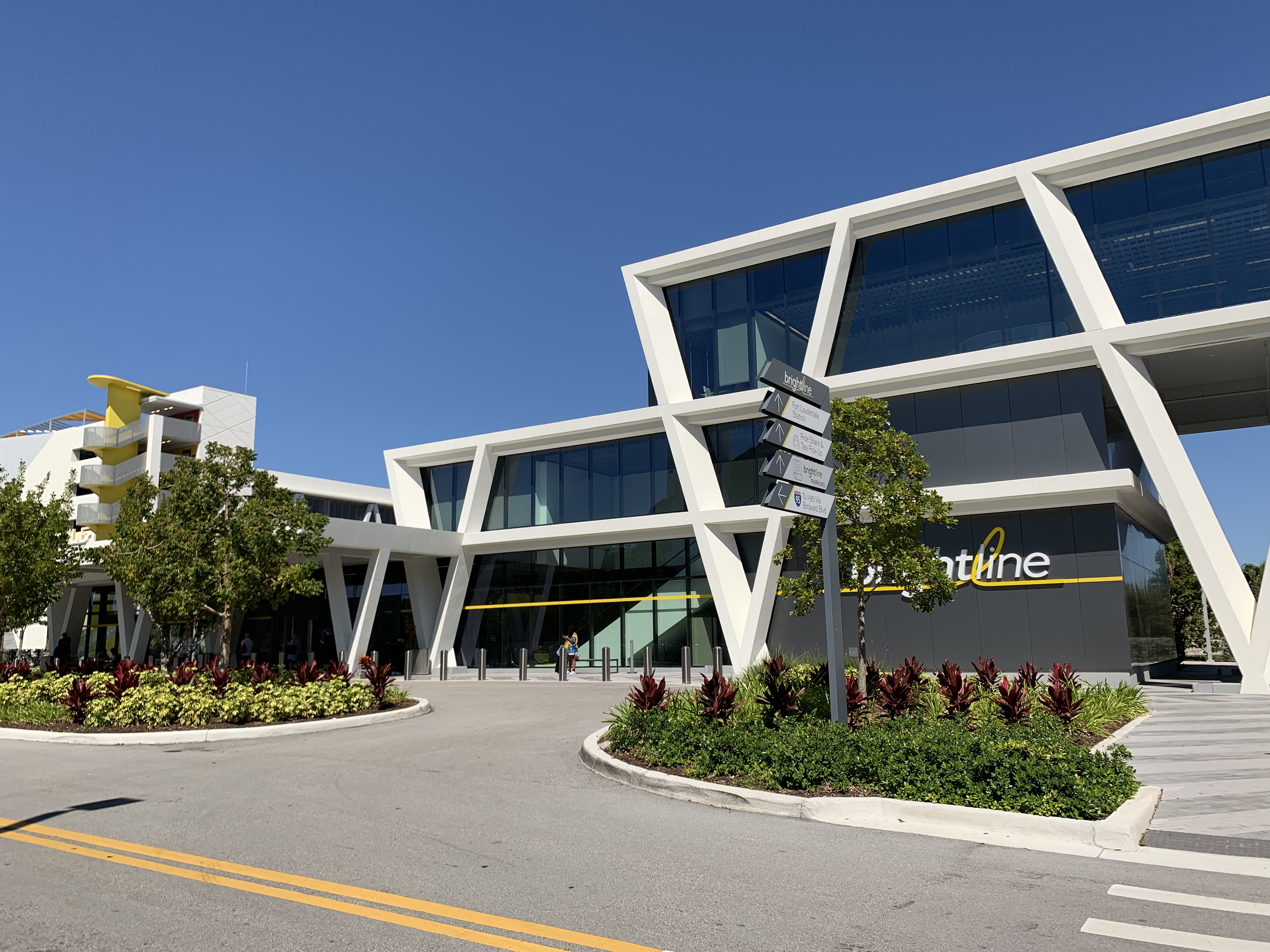

General information
- Location: 101 NW 2nd Avenue; Fort Lauderdale, Florida; United States
- Coordinates: 26.12366°N 80.14611°W
- Owner: Florida East Coast Industries
- Operator: Brightline
- Line: Florida East Coast Railway
- Platforms: 1 island platform
- Tracks: 2
- Connections: Brightline+ to Fort Lauderdale–Hollywood International Airport; BCT: 6, 9, 10. 11. 14, 20, 22, 30, 31, 40, 50, 60, 81; Sun Trolley

Construction
- Structure type: At-grade
- Parking: On-site parking garage; paid
- Cycle facilities: Racks
- Accessible: Yes

History
- Opened: January 13, 2018

Services
Preceding station	Brightline	Following station
Boca Raton toward Orlando	Brightline	Aventura toward MiamiCentral
Proposed services
Preceding station	Tri-Rail	Following station
Terminus	Green Line (proposed)	Wilton Manors toward Toney Penna
Fort Lauderdale Airport/Port Everglades toward Downtown Miami	Red Line (proposed)	Wilton Manors toward Mangonia Park
Location

Fort Lauderdale station is an inter-city rail station located in Fort Lauderdale, Florida. It is served by Brightline's line between Miami and Orlando. The station is located in downtown Fort Lauderdale, on NW 2nd Avenue between Broward Boulevard and NW 4th Street, adjacent to the Broward County Transit's Central Terminal. The station is also served by Sun Trolley.

== History ==
Construction for the station began October 2014 with the demolition of existing structures on the site. The complex consists of an elevated concourse above an 800-foot-long (240 m), 35-foot-wide (11 m) island platform for the trains. The station is a modern style structure with illuminated V-shaped columns supporting the upper concourse, echoing the designs of the Miami and West Palm Beach stations on the line. It was planned and designed by Skidmore, Owings & Merrill in association with Zyscovich Architects, and was completed in January 2018.
