= Flagler (company) =

American commercial real estate firm

- Type: Private
- Industry: Real Estate Development, Property Management, Brokerage Services
- Founded: 1892
- Founder: Henry M. Flagler
- Headquarters: Coral Gables, Florida, U.S.
- Website: www.flaglerdev.com

Flagler is a commercial real estate company headquartered in Coral Gables, Florida. Flagler is a corporate legacy of American businessman Henry M. Flagler.

The company has developed more than 30 million square feet of commercial real estate space over the past 30 years. It also owns more than 2,500 acres of developable land statewide, and manages or leases more than 13 million square feet of commercial property. The Flagler company is a wholly owned subsidiary of Florida East Coast Industries. Its development projects include the new world headquarters for Bacardi USA, in Miami; Office Depot's world headquarters, in Boca Raton; and Miami's Flagler Station, South Florida's largest business park.

Flagler has shifted its focus in recent years away from owning commercial real estate properties, and more towards development and providing brokerage, property management and asset management services to larger, institutional clients.

== History ==
Flagler's origins date back to the original railroad company founded by Henry M. Flagler in 1888. After visiting Florida with his sick wife, Flagler saw the state's great potential for tourism. He began purchasing small railroad companies, and started expanding his rail network down Florida's eastern seaboard. Florida East Coast Railway eventually stretched from Jacksonville to Key West. To support rail operations, Flagler also invested millions of dollars developing new infrastructure such as hotels, resorts, roadways, and utilities.

In 1983, the St. Joe Company, which was named FECR's majority shareholder in 1961 following a lengthy bankruptcy, split off the real estate operations from the rail company. Known first as Gran Central Corporation and later as Flagler Development Company, the firm merged in 2006 with another large real estate developer and service provider, the Codina Group, and changed its name to Flagler Development Group. Gran Central Corporation was renamed Flagler Development Company in July 2000.

In 2009, Fortress Investment Group purchased Flagler's parent company, Florida East Coast Industries, which still also owned FECR, for $3.5 billion. Shortly after, Fortress spun off FECR into a separate, distinct company.

Following the arrival of Vincent Signorello as company President and CEO in 2010, FECI underwent a significant strategic realignment, resulting in the creation of four distinct companies all operating under the FECI umbrella: All Aboard Florida (operator of Brightline), Flagler Global Logistics, Parallel Infrastructure, and Flagler Development.

In 2012, the company sold off a significant developed portion of its Flagler Station business park in Miami, while holding on to the undeveloped parcels.

== Services ==
Flagler markets itself as a full-service commercial real estate provider with more than a century of experience in Florida. Their core services include development, brokerage, and property management and asset management.

=== Development ===
Flagler has developed more than 30 million square feet of commercial property over the past three decades, working with some of the region's largest businesses, including:

- 11 million square feet of suburban office buildings. Projects include Ryder Systems, Strayer University, and Flagler Center.
- 18 million square feet of industrial warehouse/distribution facilities. Projects include Flagler Station, Beacon Lakes, and Centergate at Gratigny.
- 1.5 million square feet of office/retail space. Projects include Bacardi USA Headquarters, Office Depot Global Headquarters, and Toyota Headquarters.
- 6 million square feet of tenant improvements. Projects include Carnival Cruise Lines, Target, and DHL.
- Thousands of acres of infrastructure improvements & roadways. Projects include Dolphin Mall, The Palms at Town and Country, 1800 Military Trail, Flagler Center, and SouthPark Center.

Flagler has received a number of awards for its development efforts, including “Developer of the Year” by the Commercial Real Estate Industry Association (NAIOP) in the South, Central, and North Florida markets.

Flagler has also made a commitment to building eco-friendly projects. The company is a member of the U.S. Green Building Council, and encourages its staff to work towards LEED certification in their particular fields.

=== Land ===
According to the company, Flagler owns approximately 2,500 acres of land across north, central, and southern Florida, with a focus on the Jacksonville, Orlando, Fort Lauderdale and Miami metro areas.

=== Brokerage services ===
Flagler was at one time considered Florida's largest commercial brokerage firm. Following a strategic shift, the firm has shifted into a high-quality, boutique brokerage operation that focuses on providing a full suite of services to large, blue-chip, or institutional clients, such as JP Morgan and AEW Capital Management.

Flagler's services include helping property owners find tenants, helping businesses find space to buy or lease, strategic consulting services to help property owners maximize assets, property management, development services, and land sales.

=== Property management ===
Flagler manages and leases approximately 14 million square feet of commercial space throughout Florida. The company's client roster includes AEW Capital Management, Barclays, and Morgan Stanley, as well as several institutional lenders and special servicers.

Services provided include property operations, property accounting and reporting, lease administration, property financial planning and budgeting, and real estate tax review.

== Leadership ==
Vincent Signorello is president of Flagler and oversees the company's daily operations. Signorello also serves as president and CEO of Flagler's parent company, Florida East Coast Industries. He holds an M.B.A. in corporate finance from Boston University and a B.S. from Boston College .

Keith A. Tickell currently serves as Flagler's Chief Operating Officer. Prior to joining Flagler in 2001, Tickell worked in executive-level positions with The North Highland Company, in Atlanta, and The Wilson Company and Sabal Corp., both out of Tampa. He earned his M.B.A. from Emory University. He is a native of Tampa, a graduate of The University of South Florida, and a CPA (inactive ).

Kolleen O.P. Cobb is General Counsel and Executive Vice President of Flagler. Prior to joining Flagler in 2000, Cobb was with Hughes Hubbard & Reed LLP, of New York. Mrs. She earned her bachelor's degree, master's degree, and Juris Doctor from the University of Florida, and is a member of the University of Florida Law Review and the Urban Land Institute.

Jeanne Stormes is Vice President of Property Operations where she oversees Flagler Real Estate Services. Prior to joining Flagler, Stormes held management positions at The St. Joe Company, Regency Centers, and Barnett Banks, Inc. She holds a Bachelor of Business Administration in Corporate Finance from the University of North Florida.
