= Brightline =

Intercity rail service in Florida

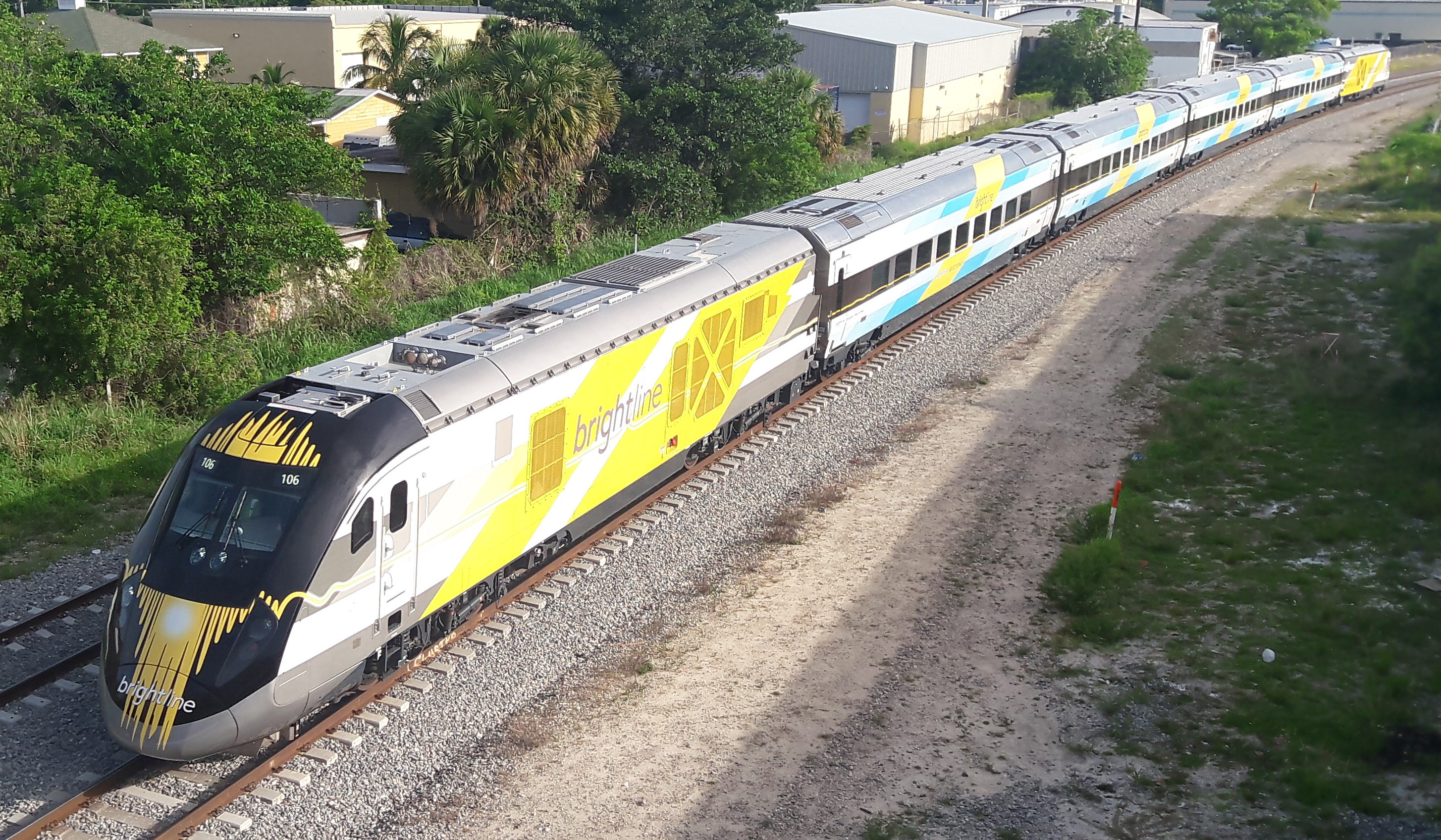
- Brightline train at Southern Boulevard in 2017

Overview
- Service type: Inter-city higher-speed rail
- Locale: Florida, United States
- First service: January 13, 2018; 8 years ago
- Current operator: Florida East Coast Industries
- Ridership: 3,116,323 (2025)
- Website: gobrightline.com

Route
- Termini: Miami; Orlando
- Stops: 6
- Distance travelled: 235 mi (378 km)
- Average journey time: 3.5 hours
- Service frequency: Hourly

On-board services
- Classes: Premium (business class); Smart (coach)
- Disabled access: Level boarding
- Seating arrangements: 2×2 (smart); 1×2 (premium)
- Catering facilities: At-seat service
- Baggage facilities: Overhead racks, checked baggage available

Technical
- Rolling stock: Siemens Charger SCB-40 locomotives; Siemens Venture trainsets
- Track gauge: 4 ft 8 1/2 in (1,435 mm) standard gauge
- Operating speed: Orlando–Cocoa: 125 mph (200 km/h); Cocoa–West Palm Beach: 110 mph (180 km/h); West Palm Beach–Miami: 80 mph (130 km/h)
- Track owners: Florida East Coast Railway (Miami–Cocoa); Brightline (Cocoa–Orlando)
Route map
Brightline route

Brightline (reporting mark: BLFX) is an intercity rail route, with some aspects of a commuter rail, in the United States that runs between Miami and Orlando, Florida. Part of the route runs on track owned and shared by the Florida East Coast Railway.

Brightline is the only privately owned and operated intercity passenger railroad in the United States. Its development started in March 2012 as All Aboard Florida by Florida East Coast Industries, a Floridian real estate developer owned by Fortress Investment Group. Construction began in November 2014. The route began revenue service in January 2018, initially between Fort Lauderdale and West Palm Beach. The Miami to Fort Lauderdale segment began revenue service in May 2018. Infill stations at Aventura and Boca Raton opened in December 2022, and the West Palm Beach to Orlando segment began revenue service in September 2023. Additional stops are being planned for the route.

Brightline's maximum operating speed is 125 miles per hour (201 km/h) over a 35-mile (56 km) section between Orlando and Cocoa. Trains cover the 235-mile (378 km) route in 3 hours and 25 minutes, with an average speed of 69 miles per hour (111 km/h).

In September 2018, Fortress Investment Group announced that it would acquire XpressWest, a venture capital proposal to build a privately funded high-speed rail passenger train from Apple Valley, California, to Las Vegas. In September 2020, Fortress Investment Group renamed the project Brightline West and the service is projected to begin passenger service in 2029.

== Origins and history ==
Former All Aboard Florida logo

In 2012, All Aboard Florida, a wholly owned subsidiary of Florida East Coast Industries (FECI), announced plans to operate passenger rail service between Miami and Orlando. The construction was projected at the time to be $1.5 billion. In March 2013, All Aboard Florida applied for a $1.6 billion Railroad Rehabilitation and Improvement Financing (RRIF) loan, which was administered by the Federal Railroad Administration, and in late 2014, the company applied for a $1.75 billion private activity bond allocation, with proceeds from the bond sale substantially reducing or replacing entirely the amount of the RRIF loan request.

In January 2013, the company received a Finding of No Significant Impact from the Federal Railroad Administration, effectively clearing way for work to begin between Miami and West Palm Beach. The Final Environmental Impact Statement was released on August 4, 2015. By the beginning of 2015, the company had started site work at the Miami, Fort Lauderdale and West Palm Beach stations, plus right-of-way improvements along stretches of the corridor. On November 10, 2015, All Aboard Florida announced that the service would operate under the name Brightline.

In mid-2014, construction began on the Miami–West Palm Beach section with the laying of new tracks and closure of the temporary surface lots in Government Center, downtown Miami. Preliminary work on the Miami station, such as site preparation and demolition, began later in the year. Suffolk Construction was the general contractor for the Miami station. Piles were being set on the four lots of MiamiCentral in early 2015.

In October 2014, work on the Fort Lauderdale station began with the demolition of existing buildings on the site. A groundbreaking ceremony for the West Palm Beach station was held in November 2014. Moss & Associates, of Fort Lauderdale, was the general contractor for the West Palm Beach and Fort Lauderdale stations.

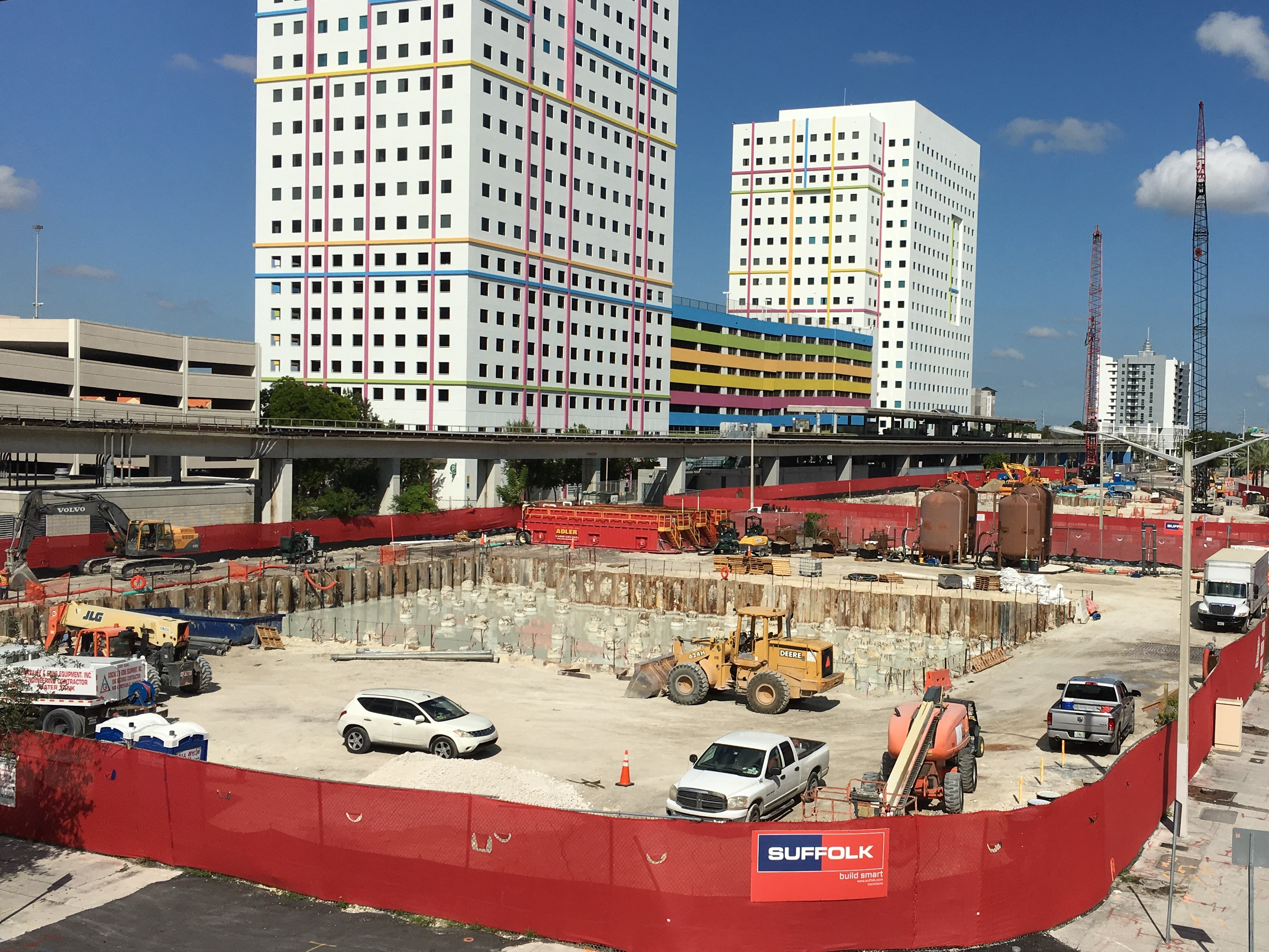
Construction on MiamiCentral in 2015

In January 2015, crews started replacing tracks throughout the corridor. All Aboard Florida secured leasing of easement rights alongside the Beachline from the Central Florida Expressway Authority for $1.4 million in December 2015.

Revenue service between Fort Lauderdale and West Palm Beach began on January 13, 2018. Service between Miami and West Palm Beach, and between Miami and Fort Lauderdale, began on May 19, 2018. In September 2018, Brightline acquired XpressWest, a private company that intends to connect Las Vegas, Nevada, with Southern California via Victorville, California. Brightline announced the intent of purchasing 38 acres of land near the Las Vegas Strip for a station and following the Interstate 15 corridor from Las Vegas to Southern California.

Two key counties on the coastal route north of the West Palm Beach station have, for various reasons, been fighting the extension of the rail line through Martin and Indian River Counties in court. One of their objections is that Brightline is owned by a private corporation, so they should not be allowed to issue tax-exempt bonds as if they were a municipality. In December 2018, after four years of legal battles, a Federal District Judge threw out a suit by Indian River County that claimed the U.S. Department of Transportation improperly approved the bond allocation, clearing the way for construction of the new rail corridor through the Treasure Coast and Space Coast. In October 2020, the US Supreme Court declined to hear the appeal of that decision, ending Indian River County's efforts to stymie development. The county's efforts at a Supreme Court hearing were financed with over $200,000 in private donations in addition to over $4 million in County funds.

In April 2019, the company secured $1.75 billion in funding for the Orlando extension and said construction would begin right away. As of May 2019, the contractors on the project were the Hubbard Construction Company, Wharton-Smith Inc., The Middlesex Corporation, Granite, and HSR Constructors. These five contractors are responsible for the development of 170 miles (270 km) of new track into the completed state-of-the-art intermodal facility located in the new South Terminal at the Orlando International Airport (MCO).

In June 2019, construction work on Phase 2 began, between West Palm Beach and Orlando, with a groundbreaking ceremony at Orlando International Airport. Preliminary work on the corridor began in September 2019, in the area of Jensen Beach and Sebastian, and began path clearing for construction of the Orlando–Cocoa portion in October 2019.

In 2019, Brightline operations sent a letter to the city of Boca Raton about the possibility of adding their city as an infill station along the Florida route. Brightline proposed constructing the station and rail infrastructure while the city would cover access and zoning requirements and costs.

In October 2019, Miami-Dade County allocated $76 million to build a Brightline Aventura station by the Aventura Mall in Ojus, Florida, between Miami and Fort Lauderdale. At the time of the announcement, the projected opening date was October 2020. Groundbreaking on the station occurred in September 2020. On June 21, 2023, it was announced that construction was completed. In December 2019, the former community garden next to the Boca Raton Public Library was officially chosen as the site for the station.

Brightline crossed a key milestone in 2019, having transported over 1 million riders over the year. However, in light of the COVID-19 pandemic, it suspended operations on March 25, 2020. All train services ceased, and the company cut 250 jobs. Construction north to Orlando continued, as well as plans for the stations in Aventura and Boca Raton.

In January 2021, the company stated that service would begin again in "late 2021," contrary to their earlier estimate of the third quarter of 2021. The company said that most station and operations staff would be brought back approximately 30–60 days before services resumed. Throughout January 2021 and May 2021, the trains ran occasionally with no passengers, in order to test an upgraded corridor between the West Palm Beach and Miami train stations. Services resumed on November 8, 2021, between West Palm Beach and Miami.

The station in Boca Raton began service on December 21, 2022, while the station in Aventura began service on December 24, 2022. Revenue service between West Palm Beach and Orlando's International Airport Intermodal Terminal began on September 22, 2023.

=== Financial difficulties ===
In April 2024, Brightline recapitalized with a $3.2 billion bond issuance as part of a debt restructuring. This came as Brightline's operations cost $23 million more than revenue with quarterly losses more than doubled with losses widening to $116 million including interest in Q1 of 2024. The bond issuance was recognized as The Bond Buyer's deal of the year.

The company posted a net loss of $549 million despite doubling revenue and booking 3 million trips in fiscal year 2024. Operational losses represented $153 million of those losses; Brightline has never turned an operational profit. However, the company had $5.8 billion in assets over more than $2 billion in debt.

In July 2025, due to continuing cash flow losses, Brightline's bond credit rating was cut to B from BB-plus by Fitch. Amidst financial challenges, it also deferred a July 15 interest payment on its 10% and 12% unrated tax-exempt bonds. However, a proposed $400 million bond to fund the proposed expansion to Tampa continued to move towards approval. In September 2025, the Department of Transportation delivered four new grants to upgrade safety on Brightline. The grants coincided with an expansion from 19 to 28 daily trips in Boca Raton.

On May 1, 2026, it was reported that Brightline Florida raised a going concern warning, lacking liquidity for a coming debt payment. On September 24, 2026, Brightline Florida filed for Chapter 11 bankruptcy in New Jersey, citing disappointing revenue which left the company unable to pay billions it borrowed to finance itself. The company listed assets and liabilities between $1 billion and $10 billion.

== Branding and naming rights ==
In November 2018, it was announced that Virgin Group would become a minority investor in the railroad and would provide rights to rebrand the service as Virgin Trains USA. In August 2020, railroad managers announced that Virgin had not provided the agreed investment money and the company would be ending its branding deal, returning to the previous Brightline brand. In March 2021, Virgin sued Brightline for $251.3 million because of the broken contract. In October 2023, Virgin won the lawsuit and the judge awarded Virgin $115 million in damages.

In June 2025, Brightline CFO Jeff Swiatek stated that the company was exploring selling naming rights or seeking a sponsorship deal to boost revenue.

== Service ==
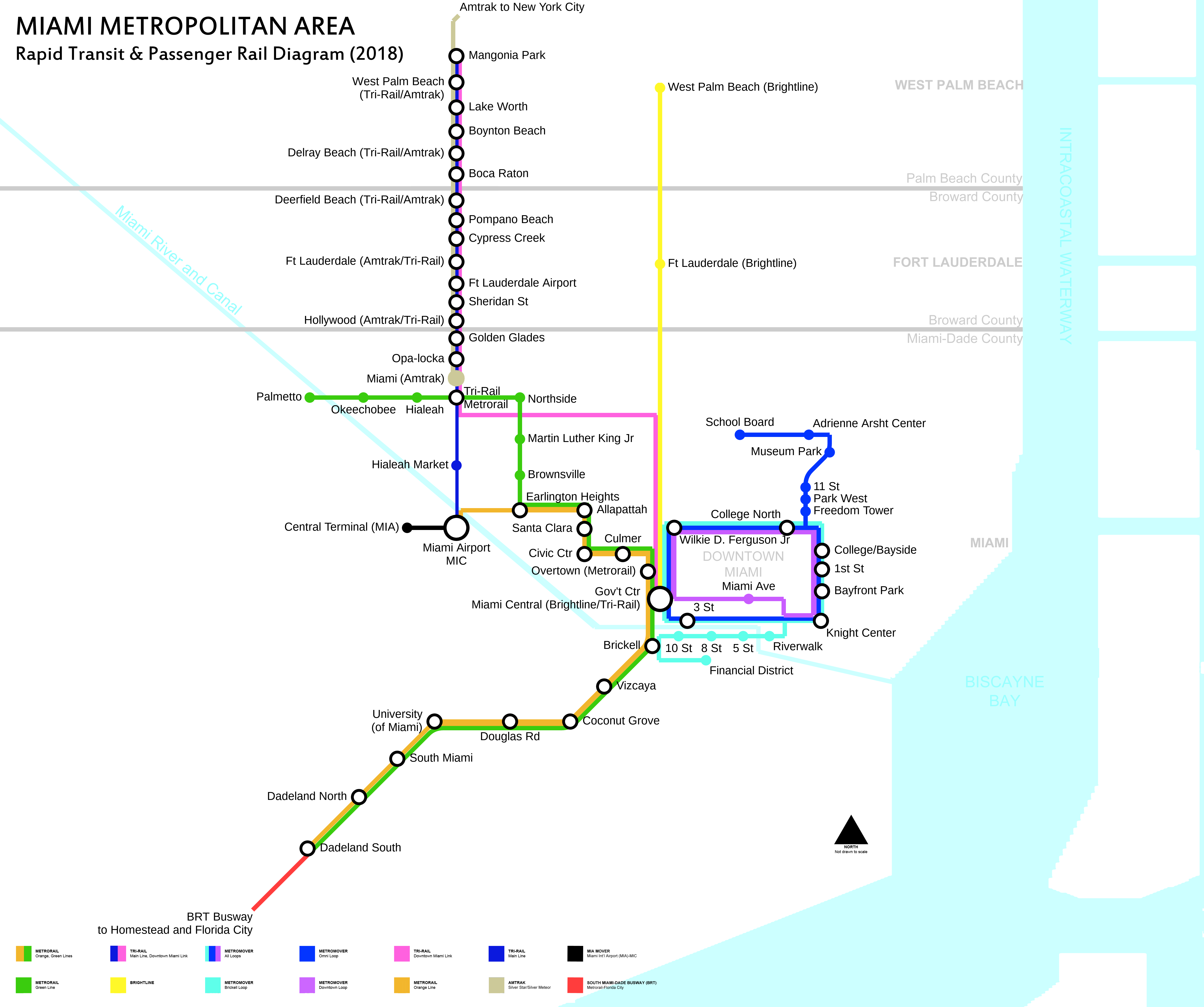
A schematic of rapid transit and passenger rail service in the Miami metropolitan area in 2017. The Tri-Rail Downtown Miami Link became operational in January 2024.

=== Route ===
The route is made up of the following stations, from north to south:

County	Station	Brightline in-service date	Time to Miami (min) (Note: Fastest timetabled journey.)	Connections
Orange	Orlando	September 22, 2023	210	Orlando International Airport; Lynx: 11, 42, 51, 311, 407, 436S
Palm Beach	West Palm Beach	January 13, 2018	72	Palm Tran: 1, 41, 95X; West Palm Move
Palm Beach	Boca Raton	December 21, 2022	51	Palm Tran: 1, 94
Broward	Fort Lauderdale	January 13, 2018	30	BCT: 1, 6, 9, 10, 11, 14, 20, 22, 30, 31, 40, 50, 60, 81, 101 (at Central Terminal); LauderGo!: Downtown Link, Neighborhood Link, NW Community Link
Miami-Dade	Aventura	December 24, 2022	17	Metrobus: 183
Miami-Dade	MiamiCentral	May 19, 2018	—N/a	Tri-Rail; Metrorail: ■ Green Line, ■ Orange Line (at Government Center); Metromover: Omni Loop, Brickell Loop, Inner Loop (at Government Center); Metrobus: 2, 7/7A, 11, 21, 77, 95, 100, 101, 207, 208, 211, 400, 401, 836, 837/836; Broward County Transit: 109, 110; Miami Trolley: Coral Way

=== Schedule ===
As of September 2023, there were 18 daily round trips between Miami and West Palm Beach of which 16 covered the full route between Miami and Orlando. Roughly half of trains made stops at all stations along the line, while the remainder skip Boca Raton station.

In mid 2024, Brightline announced a new schedule optimized for commuters with MiamiCentral seeing increased service with five southbound trains arriving between 7:00–9:30 a.m. (up from four), and five northbound trains will depart between 3:45–6:45 p.m. (also up from four). Service to Boca Raton also increased with 80% of South Florida trains and 90% of Orlando‑bound trains serving the station. At the same time, the company began running longer eight‑coach trains and plans to expand to ten‑coach trains, nearly doubling capacity.

=== Pricing ===
As of July 2025, Brightline's average short haul fare was $24.32 while long haul was $70.96.

In May 2023, Brightline's introductory pricing for the Miami-Orlando route started at $79 for SMART and $149 for PREMIUM with a SMART bundle available for families of four of less than $199 one way.

Brightline introduced a South Florida commuter pass marketed as the "SoFlo Solo Pass" with pricing starting at $399 for 40 rides in October 2023. In June 2025, the company discontinued the passes blaming lack of capacity. Fixed Rate 10-Ride Packs were also available between Miami and West Palm Beach for $350 and $550 for standard seats and premium seats. The passes were reintroduced in January 2025 after a Federal Railroad Administration grant allowed the company to begin running longer trains to increase capacity.

Starting in September 2025, Brightline introduced peak and off-peak pricing with predictable pricing within South Florida.

Ticket pricing from West Palm Beach
To	Off-peak	Peak hours
Boca Raton	$12	$26
Fort Lauderdale	$15	$29
Aventura	$17	$34
Miami	$19	$39

In May 2025, Brightline introduced new passes, starting at 10 rides for $239. The passes were introduced as part of the Brightline Rewards loyalty program, allowing buyers to earn points in the program.

Pass	10 rides	20 rides	40 rides
Between Aventura and Miami	—N/a	—N/a	$299
Between Fort Lauderdale and Miami	$239	$449	$499
Between West Palm Beach/Boca Raton and Miami	$299	$529	$599
Between Orlando and any South Florida station	$799	—N/a	—N/a

==== Loyalty program ====
In April 2025, Brightline announced its loyalty program, Brightline Rewards, allowing riders to earn 5 points on every qualifying dollar spent. At the time, the Sun Sentinel suggested the program would result in an additional 15,000 riders per month. To launch the program, Brightline ran a promotion giving each passenger who signed up by May 30, 2025 prizes ranging from 500 to 100,000 points. The company also created the Brightline Rewards Traveling Wall with a wall of envelopes containing rewards ranging from 500 points to food and beverage discounts between the launch and April 14. Brightline Rewards is powered by Antavo's Loyalty Cloud. The program allows points earning on tickets, upgrades, parking, and baggage.

=== Ridership ===
During the first two and a half months of introductory service between West Palm Beach and Fort Lauderdale, ridership totaled 74,780, increasing from 17,800 in January to 32,900 in March 2018. The company itself announced that the ridership has been triple what had been expected. The forecast provided to bond investors calls for 240,000 passengers per month by 2020, which includes service to Miami, and analyst Fitch Ratings has said that the company could break even at 56% of their ridership forecast.

By the end of 2018, almost 600,000 passengers had ridden the train, and the line welcomed its 1 millionth rider in August 2019.

Service was suspended from March 2020 until November 2021 due to the COVID-19 pandemic.

In August 2022, Brightline transported over 100,000 passengers. This was the first time it crossed the 100,000 passengers per month mark. In December 2022, Brightline served over 183,000 riders.

In April 2024 Brightline Florida carried 223,117 riders, which was an increase of 48% year over year. In the first quarter of 2025, Brightline's ridership consisting exclusively of rides within South Florida were reported to be down 8% while long distance riders (between Orlando and South Florida) were up 26%.

In July 2025 Bloomberg News reported that ridership for the year was 53% below company projections, causing Brightline to delay debt interest payments for that month.

==== Ridership by year ====
Year	Ridership	Change	Ref.	Passenger totals (in millions)
2018	579,205	—N/a		
2019	1,012,804	+74.9%		
2020	271,778	−73.2%		
2021	159,474	−41.3%		
2022	1,230,494	+671.6%		
2023	2,053,893	+66.9%		
2024	2,763,512	+34.5%		
2025	3,116,323	+12.8%		

== Stations ==
The six South Florida stations were designed by Skidmore, Owings & Merrill in association with Zyscovich Architects. Rockwell Group designed the interiors. All of the Brightline stations have adjacent parking at a paid rate per day.

Brightline stations

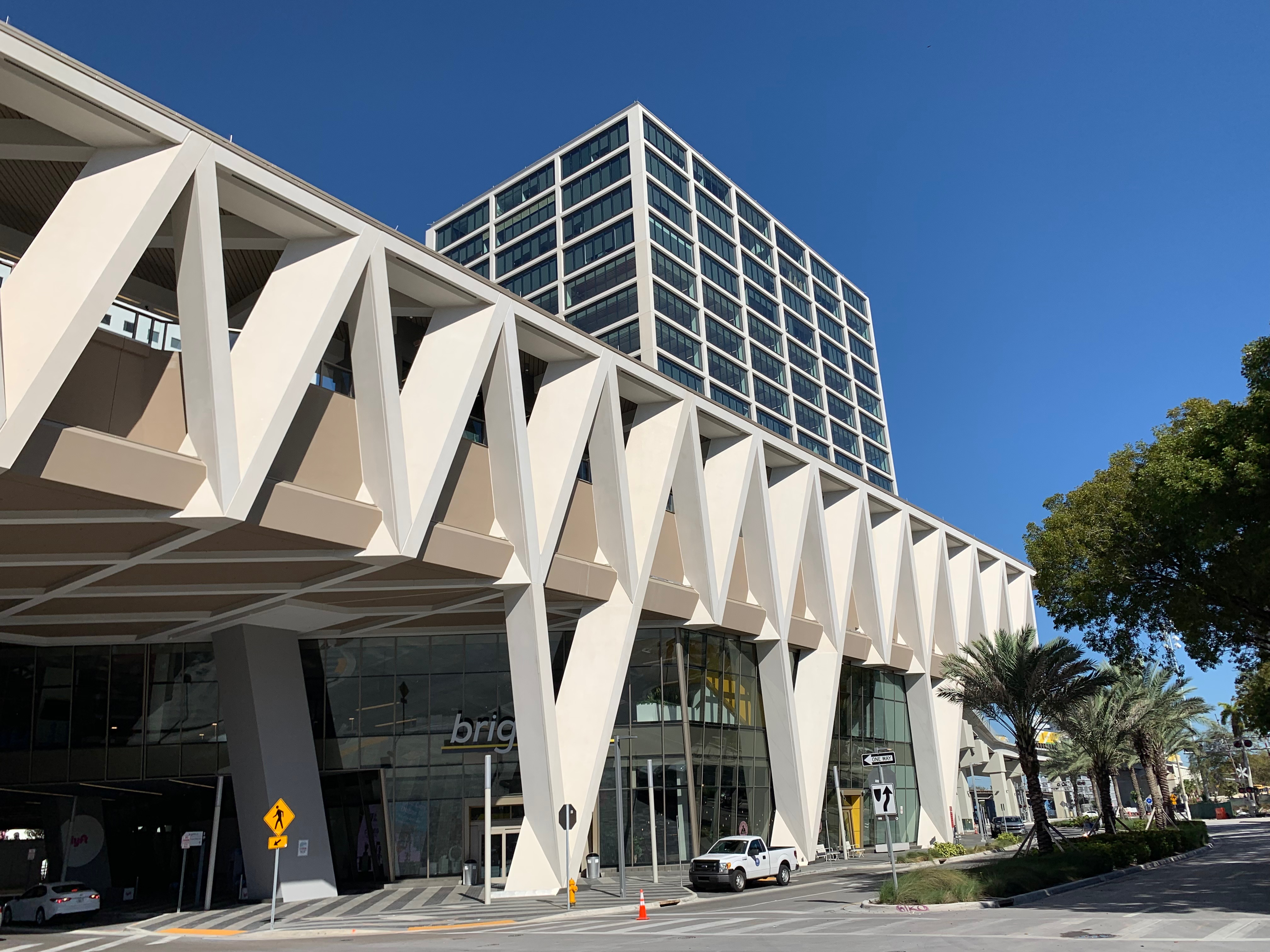
MiamiCentral station

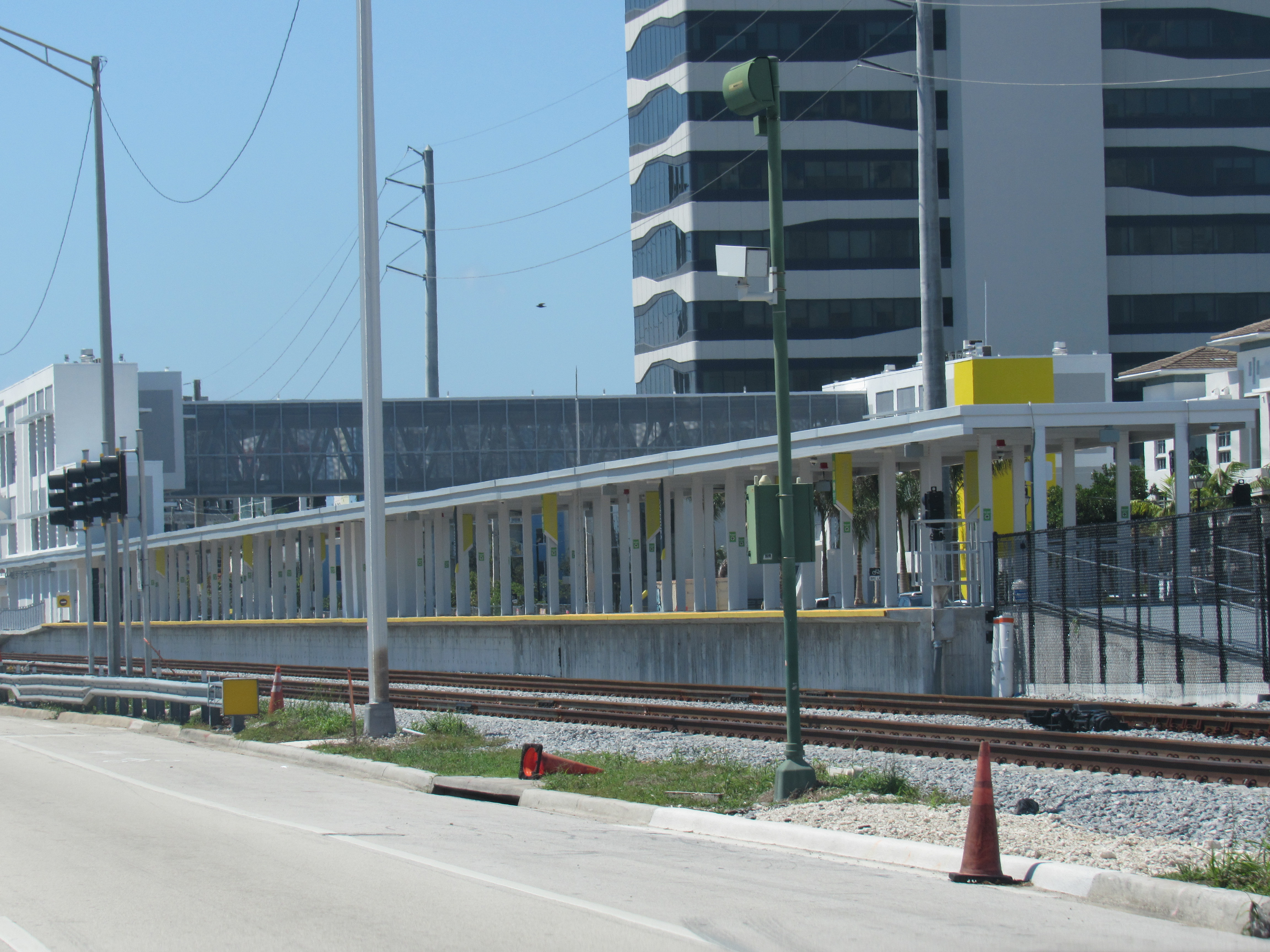
Aventura station

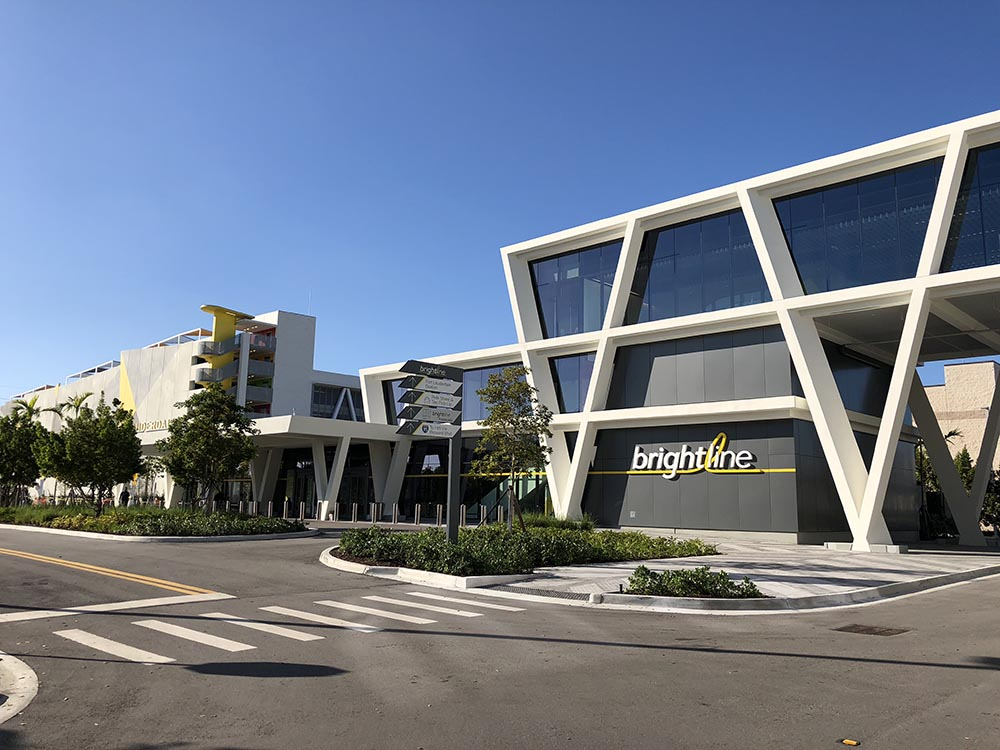
Fort Lauderdale station

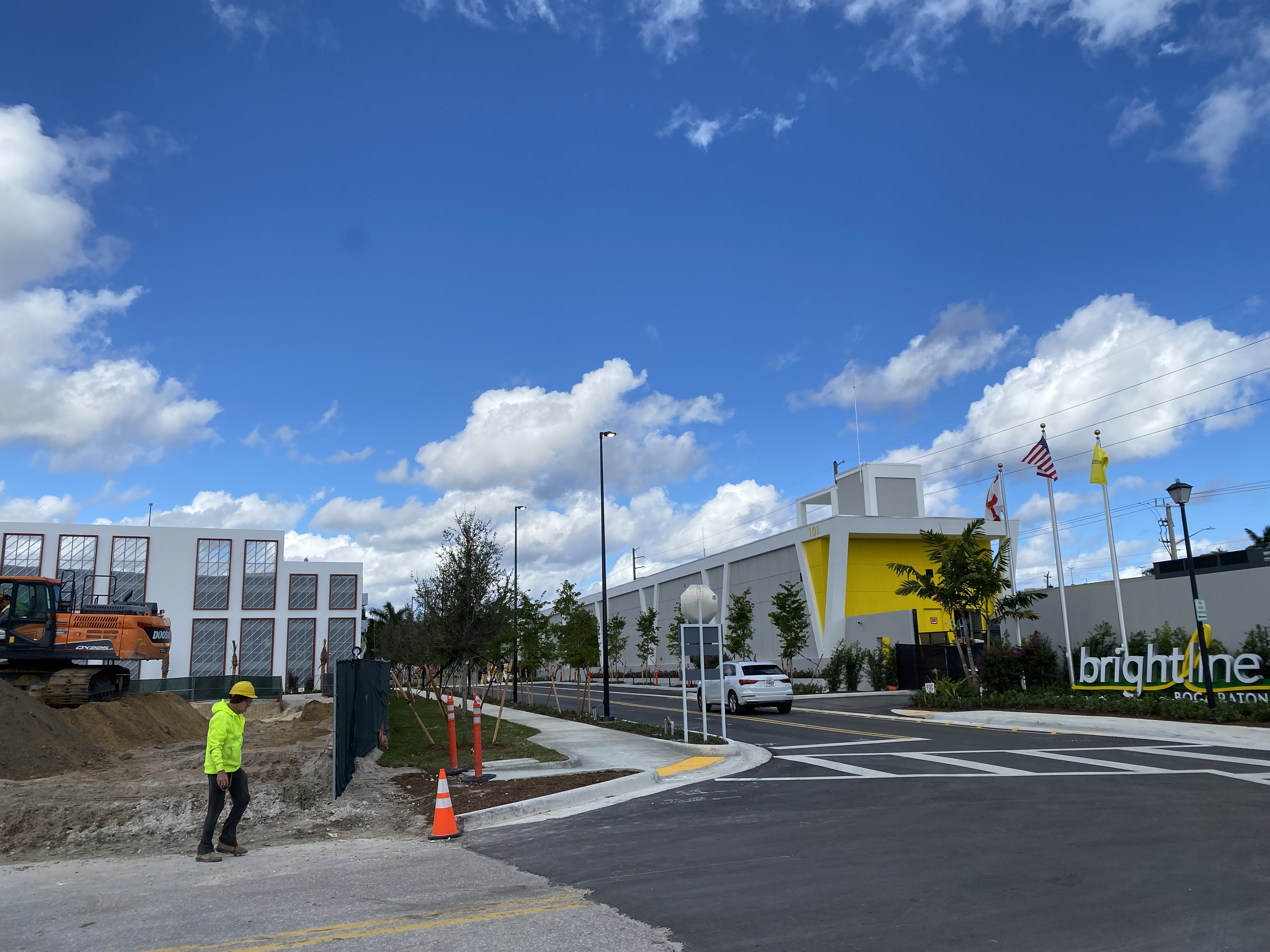
Boca Raton station

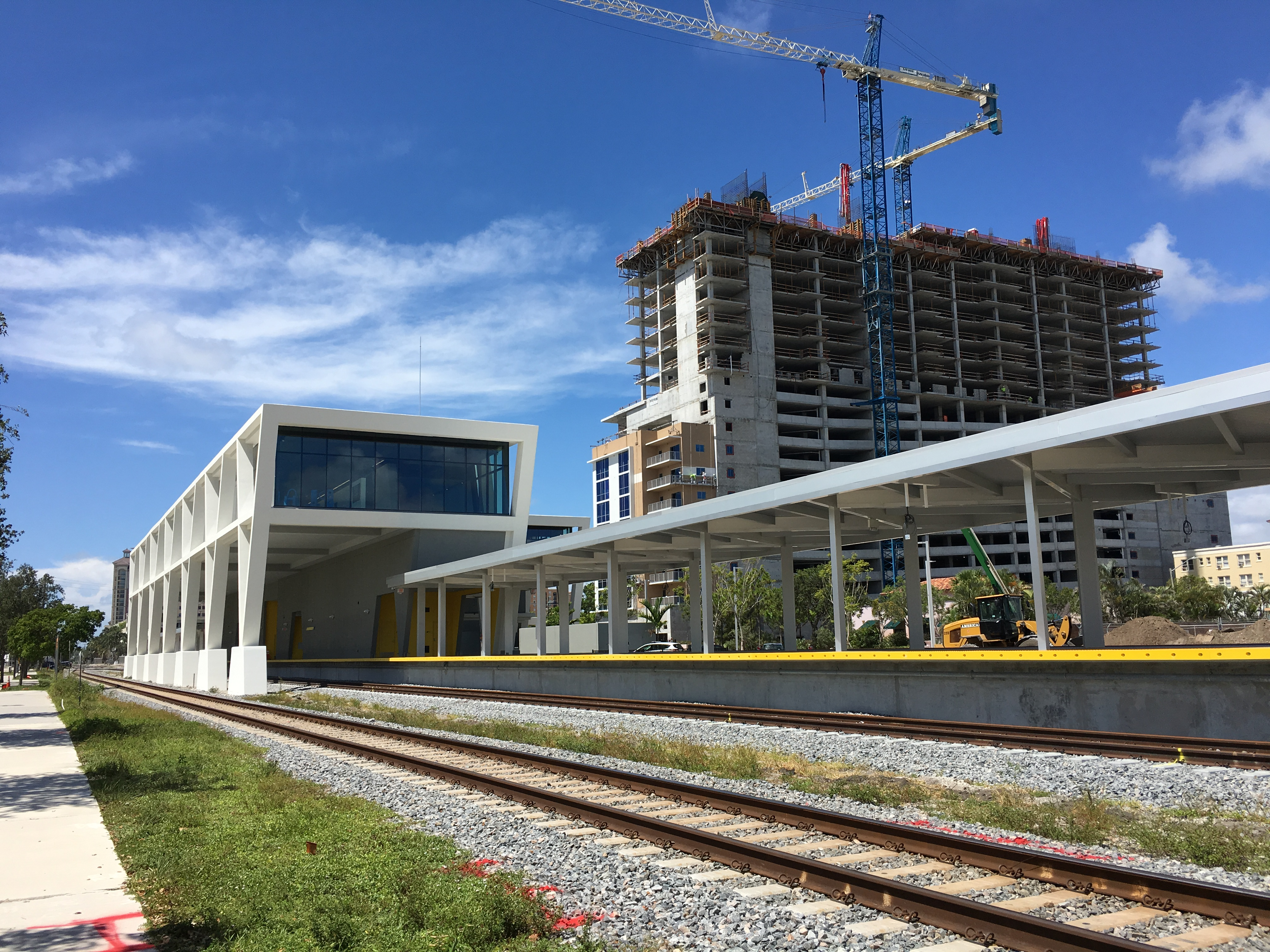
West Palm Beach station

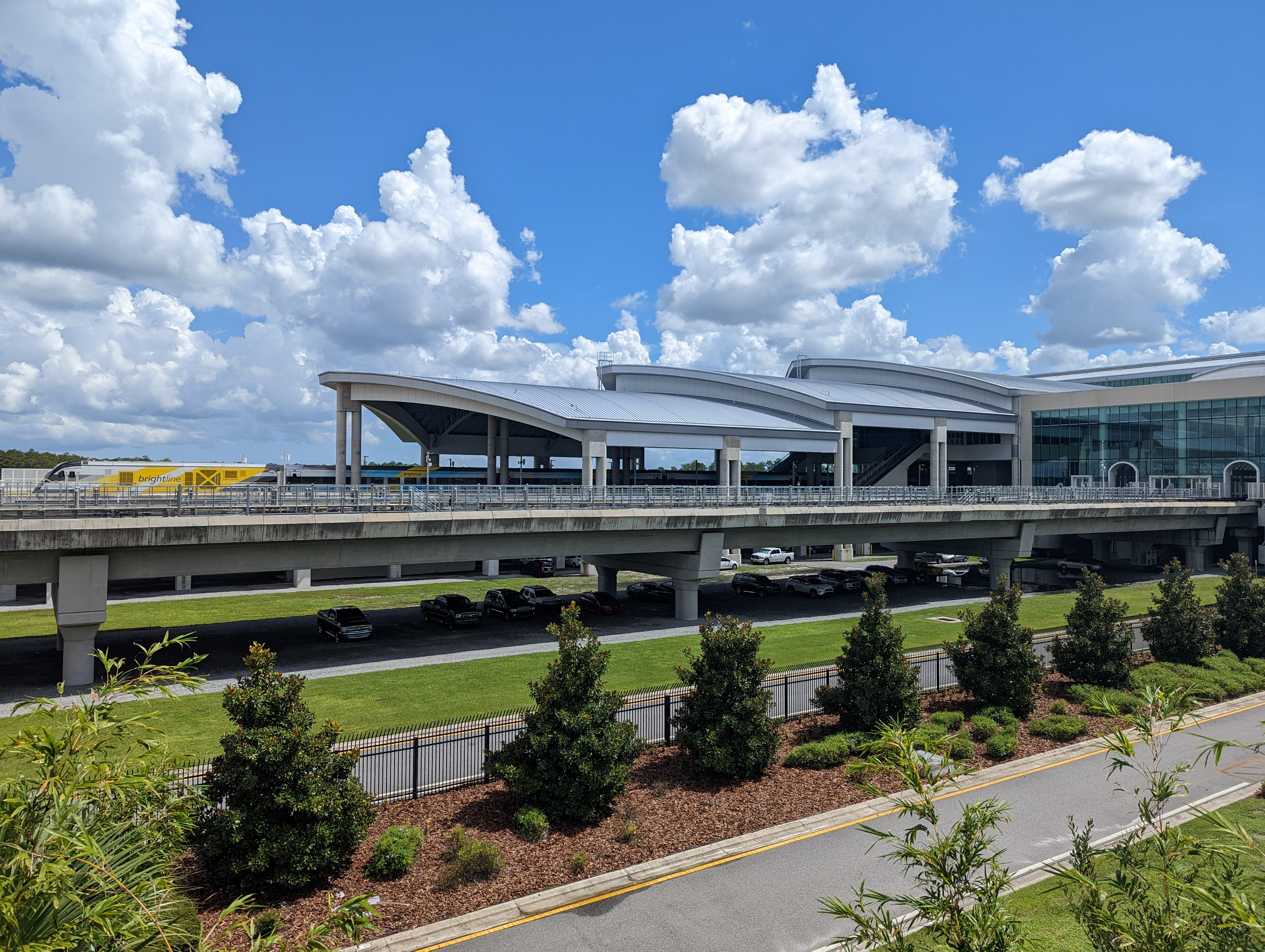
Orlando station

=== Miami ===
The downtown Miami station, known as MiamiCentral (not to be confused with Miami Central Station, now known as Miami Intermodal Center, near Miami International Airport), spans 9 acres (3.6 ha) located just east of Miami-Dade County Hall and includes 3 million square feet (280,000 m^{2}) of mixed-use development with residential, office and commercial, and a retail concourse. The station connects Brightline with the Metrorail, Metromover, Metrobus, City of Miami trolley, and Tri-Rail systems. This increases connections to activities and tourist destinations, including the Performing Arts Center, Bayside Market and Bayfront Park. Service to Miami began on May 19, 2018. Tri-Rail service commenced in January 2024.

=== Aventura ===
The Aventura station is located on West Dixie Highway west of the Aventura Mall in Ojus, Florida. The station is 34,000 sq ft (3,200 m^{2}) on a 3-acre site. There are 240 parking spaces at the Aventura station, as well as a Miami-Dade Transit bus drop-off. Complimentary shuttle service is available to and from the mall. In the future, it will include another bridge that will connect the platform to Aventura Mall, and it will serve as the terminus of planned Northeast Corridor Rapid Transit Project commuter rail service.

=== Fort Lauderdale ===
The Fort Lauderdale station is located at NW 2nd Avenue between Broward Boulevard and NW 4th Street. The four-acre station site has a 60,000 sq ft (5,600 m^{2}) station and platform. The Brightline train service in Ft. Lauderdale connects to the Sun Trolley and Broward County Transit system. Brightline also owns about three acres of land to the east of the Florida East Coast Railway corridor, where there are plans to build a transit-oriented development.

=== Boca Raton ===
The Boca Raton station is located next to the Boca Raton Public Library. The station is 22,000 sq ft (2,000 m^{2}) on a 1.8-acre site across from Mizner Park. The station has access to a 455-space parking garage that will also provide dedicated free parking for library patrons.

=== West Palm Beach ===
The West Palm Beach station is located between Datura and Evernia Streets and to the west of South Quadrille Blvd. The two-acre station site has a 60,000 sq ft (5,600 m^{2}) station and platform that connect with the neighborhood's existing vehicular, trolley and pedestrian networks and establish links to the Tri-Rail, Palm Tran Downtown Trolley and Amtrak West Palm Beach station.

=== Orlando ===
The Orlando station opened on September 22, 2023, at the Orlando International Airport Intermodal Terminal.

== Planned and proposed routes and destinations ==
=== Tampa ===
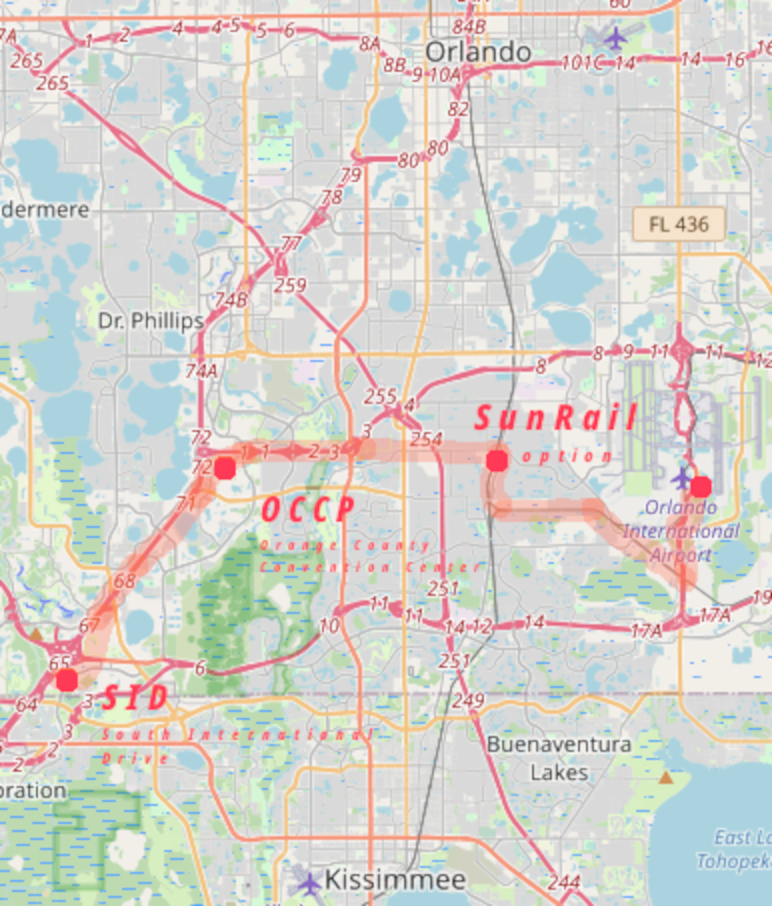
The Brightline "Sunshine Corridor" Orlando alignment as of 2022

As of September 2019, Brightline was in negotiations with the Florida Department of Transportation (FDOT) to lease right-of-way along the Interstate 4 corridor. Brightline was the only bidder to submit a proposal to construct an intercity rail line along Interstate 4, which has been designated for federally funded high-speed rail. This would be utilized for an extension of the line from Orlando International Airport to Tampa.

Potential stops along this route are the SunRail Meadow Woods station and Lakeland. The deadline for the negotiations between Central Florida Expressway Authority, FDOT, and Brightline was March 31, 2020. In September 2020, the railroad entered into a memorandum of understanding with a local developer to potentially construct the terminal station in Ybor City.

In November 2020, Brightline and Walt Disney World Resort announced an agreement to build a station in Disney Springs as a part of its Tampa extension. The high-speed rail corridor between Disney Springs and Orlando International Airport was projected to cost $1 billion and travel alongside Florida State Road 417. As of 2021 the project had yet to secure needed funding, but passenger service was planned to start by 2026.

In May 2022, Universal Orlando offered 13 acres of land near the site where Universal Epic Universe is being built for a commuter station, and bond guarantees. This was claimed to promote construction of an extension of Brightline that would include a brief confluence with SunRail between SunRail's Meadow Woods and Pine Castle stations, and lead to Disney, eventually to Tampa. They did not mention the existing proposal to run Brightline down SR 417 to Disney Springs, but it did suggest a future SunRail service to Epic Universe, the Orange County Convention Center, and Disney Springs.

In June 2022, Disney announced that Brightline would not run on their Walt Disney World park property; however Brightline said it would still build a station near Disney World to get riders as close as possible.

On July 11, 2025, Spectrum News reported that Brightline is looking to raise $400 million in funding to pay for an expansion of its high-speed rail service into Tampa through the Florida Development Finance Corporation. If approved, the funds could be used to design, develop and build the new route from Orlando to Tampa.

On July 15, 2025, Tampa's city board voted unanimously through the TEFRA (Tax Equity and Fiscal Responsibility Act) process to allow Brightline to continue negotiating with Florida Development Finance Corporation.

=== Stuart ===
On March 4, 2024, Brightline announced that an infill station on the Treasure Coast would be built in Stuart. The current plan sees the station beginning service by 2029.

=== Cocoa ===
On March 12, 2024, Brightline announced that an infill station on the Space Coast would be built in Cocoa. The current plan sees the station beginning service by 2030.

=== Future expansion ===
==== Jacksonville ====
As part of the initial construction for Brightline, All Aboard Florida said it was considering an extension to Jacksonville, Florida. Brightline currently owns passenger trackage rights along the entire Florida East Coast Railway corridor, making the prospect of an expansion of Brightline to Jacksonville much simpler due to some of the existing rail infrastructure already in place. However, no commitment has been made in writing, as starting the development of the line to Tampa is the top priority for Brightline.

==== Commuter rail ====
In 2020, it was revealed that Brightline and local governments were planning a commuter rail service to complement the existing Brightline service. Referred to as the Northeast Corridor, trains would run between MiamiCentral and Aventura with five stations between. Brightline and the Miami-Dade County Commission agreed to access fees in November 2020. The estimated cost for full buildout of the line is $325 million. Operations were expected to start as early as 2024. By 2023, station locations had been identified and service frequencies for trains were expected to be every 30 to 60 minutes.

In 2021, the Florida Department of Transportation and Broward County executed a memorandum of understanding to implement a passenger transportation system along the FEC corridor. Plans call for a 27-mile (43 km) commuter rail route starting at Aventura station in the south and running as far north as Deerfield Beach. Service could start in 2028.

It has been proposed that the commuter service could go through Palm Beach County if a deal is reached with the county, stopping at destinations such as Delray Beach and going as far north as Jupiter, which currently has no passenger rail service.

== Brightline West (Greater Los Angeles to Las Vegas) ==
On September 18, 2018, Fortress Investment Group announced that it would acquire XpressWest, a venture capital proposal to build a privately funded high-speed rail passenger train from Apple Valley, California, to Las Vegas, Nevada, from hotel developer Marnell Corrao Associates. When Fortress subsequently entered into its partnership with Virgin Group in 2019, it was announced that the newly formed consortium will build and operate XpressWest when it opens. In September 2020, Fortress Investment Group renamed the project Brightline West.

Despite funding difficulties, Brightline West has secured $3 billion from the Bipartisan Infrastructure Law and $2.5 billion of private activity bonds from the US Department of Transportation. Construction for the 180-mile-long (290 km) track started on April 22, 2024. They plan on carrying passengers between Las Vegas and Rancho Cucamonga with speeds of up to 200 mph (320 km/h) for an 85-minute trip. Trains on this line will be fully electric and run mostly in the median of Interstate 15. Fortress's Wes Edens has stated that Brightline's service is modeled off of Eurostar's Paris-to-London commute. Its coach design includes white-and-blue interiors, roomy seating, and free Wi-Fi.

By 2025, estimated costs of the project had increased to $21.05 billion with the company seeking an additional government loan of $6 billion under the Transportation Infrastructure Finance and Innovation Act to fund construction.

== Future corridor aspirations ==
Wes Edens has also expressed interest for Brightline in interviews during the Brightline West groundbreaking ceremony to connect other city pairings which are denoted by Brightline as "Too Long To Drive & Too Short To Fly", with the new "Brightline 2.0" model of utilizing Interstate land and medians to connect city pairs up. With Edens using example of city pairs such as:

- Texas Triangle (Dallas–Fort Worth, Houston, San Antonio, Austin)
- Chicago to St. Louis
- Midwest (Cleveland to Columbus)
- Cascadia (Portland, Seattle, Vancouver, Canada)
- Atlanta to Charlotte

Other corridors have been shown on official Brightline "Too Long To Drive & Too Short To Fly" maps with more denoted corridors than mentioned above including links between Washington, DC and Boston, Los Angeles to Phoenix and Las Vegas, Chicago to Madison/Cleveland/Detroit, and Miami to Jacksonville.

== Engineering ==
=== Train speeds and comparative travel times ===
A Brightline train travelling at speed of 110 mph (180 km/h).

Upon full buildout of the Miami–Orlando route, trains operate at up to 79 mph (130 km/h) between Miami and West Palm Beach, up to 110 mph (180 km/h) between West Palm Beach and Cocoa, and up to 125 mph (200 km/h) between Cocoa and the Orlando International Airport (MCO). A future extension to Tampa from Orlando is in the planning stages. Originally, trains on this corridor would operate at up to 125 mph (200 km/h); but a maximum speed of 150 mph (240 km/h) has been reported more frequently as of 2024. It is one of the few rail services in the United States to approach the lowest high-speed rail standard set by the International Union of Railways of 200 km/h (125 mph).

Brightline's travel time between Miami and Orlando is around 3 1/2 hours. Driving (without traffic) between the two takes 3 1/2 hours using Florida's Turnpike, and 3 3/4 hours using the I-95/SR 528 freeways along the planned train route via Cocoa. Although the flight time between Miami (MIA) and Orlando (MCO) is only 1 hour, the total travel time by air is around 3 hours — if one follows airlines' recommendations to arrive at the airport 2 hours prior to departure. For high-speed rail systems in Europe and East Asia, the travel time at which rail starts to attract a significant sector of the rail/air travel sector is usually given as around four hours, with rail becoming dominant over air at travel times below three hours.

For Brightline to meet that three-hour goal on its Miami–Orlando route, it would have to cut 30 minutes from the 3.5-hour travel time (as of 2024), raising its overall average speed from 69 mph (111 km/h) to 80 mph (130 km/h), which is similar to the overall average speed of Amtrak's Acela operating on the Northeast Corridor between New York City and Washington, D.C.

=== Pre-existing Miami–Cocoa Corridor upgrades ===
The project to connect Miami and Orlando called for more than $1.5 billion in upgrades to the rail corridor between Miami and Cocoa. The company double tracked the corridor, improved signaling systems, and upgraded every grade crossing to meet the highest applicable safety standards set by FDOT and Federal Railroad Administration.

In January 2013, the Federal Railroad Administration issued a Finding of No Significant Impact (FONSI) for the Miami–Cocoa phase of the project, effectively clearing the way for work to begin. Part of the corridor safety upgrades included installing positive train control (PTC), which enhances Brightline's ability to monitor and control train movements safely.

==== Quiet zones ====
Rules for quiet zones ("no train horn" areas) apply to all trains, both freight and passenger, and remove the legal duty of a train engineer to sound the horn. Train engineers may still use the horn in such zones in emergency situations, such as when train nears a person or vehicle on the tracks.

Responding to citizen concerns about noise from increased use of horns, Brightline stated that it will work with local communities to implement quiet zones where possible. Federal law requires quiet-zone requests to originate from the local authority with jurisdiction over the roadway, not from the railroad company.

In August 2014, the company announced a partnership with the Broward and Palm Beach Metropolitan Planning Organizations to implement quiet zones between the city of Hallandale Beach and 15th Street in West Palm Beach. In December 2014, the Miami-Dade Metropolitan Planning Organization approved funding to construct quiet zones between PortMiami and the northern Miami-Dade County line.

The quiet zones were originally planned to be in place by the end of 2017, when Brightline was expected to become operational between Miami and West Palm Beach. Brightline started service on January 11, 2018, but delays in constructing the quiet zones delayed their in-service date to sometime in March. Quiet zones went into effect in May 2018 in West Palm Beach, Lake Worth, and Boca Raton.

==== Bridges ====
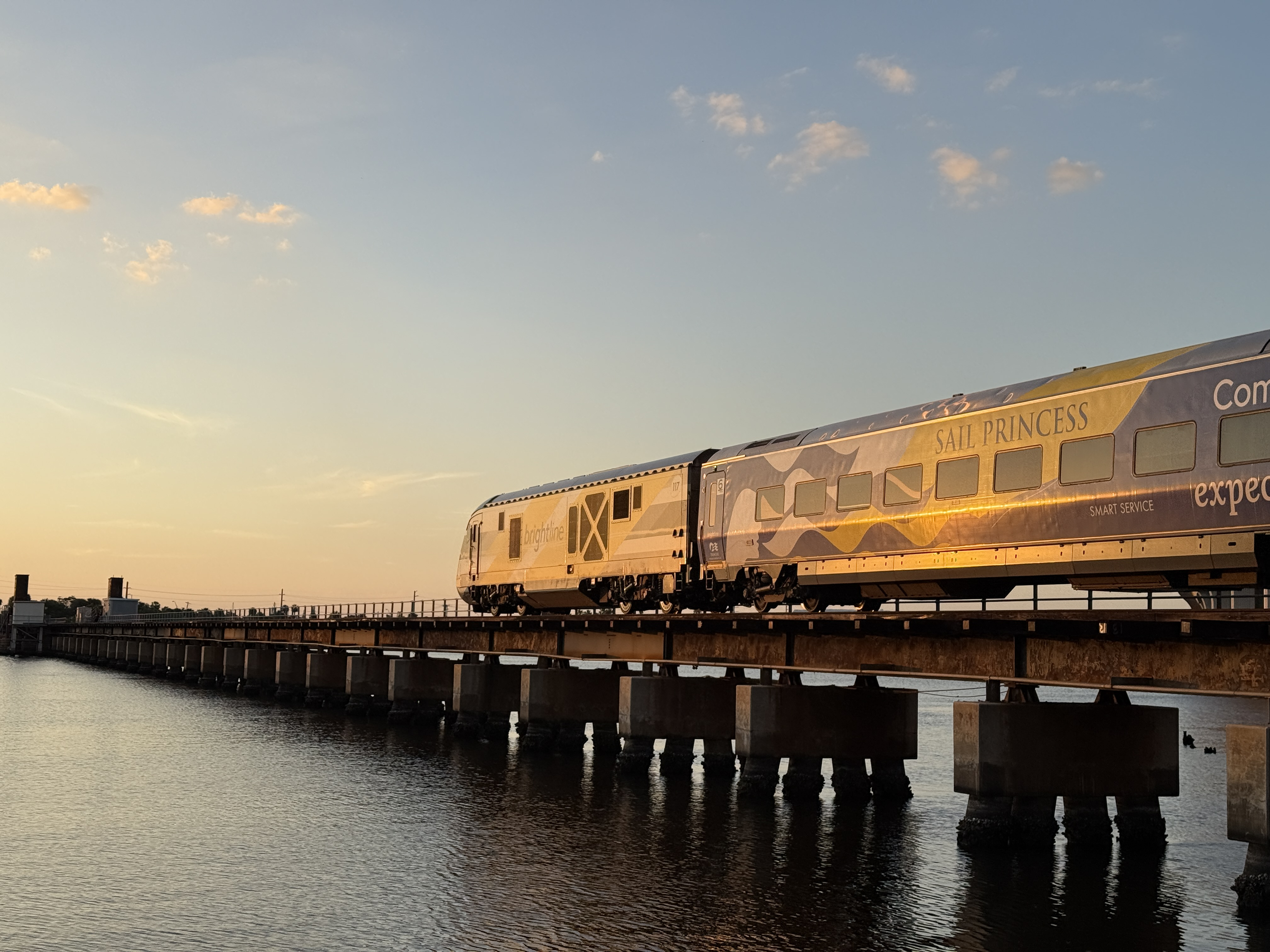
A Northbound Brightline train crossing the St. Lucie River in Stuart

The FEC rail corridor includes several fixed-span bridges that were replaced as part of the project. Most did not require United States Coast Guard (USCG) permitting as they do not span significant navigable waterways and clearances did not change. Twelve other bridges—St. Johns River, Eau Gallie River, St. Sebastian River, Crane Creek, Turkey Creek, West Palm Beach Canal, Boynton Canal, Middle River (both the North and South Fork), Oleta River, Arch Creek and Hillsboro Canal— required permitting by the USCG.

The project called for significant investment and upgrades to three movable bridges: St. Lucie, Loxahatchee, and New River. These improvements ensure that bridge mechanical systems for raising and lowering the bridge spans are either fully upgraded or replaced. The company has stated that, prior to it becoming operational, it would start to regularly notify mariners of scheduled bridge closings via the internet, smart phone application and countdown signage on the bridges to enable mariners to have real-time information to decrease wait times at each bridge. Also, the company would station a bridge tender at the New River bridge.

Prior to the opening of service to Orlando, Brightline began asking municipalities around the St. Lucie River to support a potential federal grant to fund the replacement of the single-track rail bridge over the river with a new, raised double-track span. In January 2024, the Biden administration funded the construction of the bridge with a $130 million grant from the National Infrastructure Project Assistance (Mega) grant program.

=== Cocoa–Orlando ===
The line between Cocoa and Orlando is the only segment that did not have existing track or right-of-way owned by FEC. Originally, the Central Florida Expressway Authority (CFX) believed it could accommodate building new tracks for the project within the BeachLine Expressway's 300-foot-wide (91 m) right-of-way. This segment of the proposed line would operate at speeds of up to 125 mph (200 km/h). Other high-speed rail corridors have in the past been built next to highways – for example, the Cologne–Frankfurt high-speed rail line runs parallel to the A3 federal highway for more than half of its 180-kilometre (110 mi) length.

CFX began negotiations with Deseret Ranch, which owns the land just south of the BeachLine, to purchase additional land in order to widen the right-of-way. According to a July 2013 pact, CFX tentatively agreed to pay $12 million for an extra 200 ft (61 m) along the 22-mile (35 km) BeachLine corridor between Cocoa and Orlando International Airport. In early October 2013, CFX and All Aboard Florida reached a formal purchase agreement for the land required for the right-of-way. Although construction of the segment was originally slated to begin in early 2015, it didn't start until May 22, 2019.

Also in October 2013, the Greater Orlando Aviation Authority (GOAA) board approved development of a station and maintenance facility on Orlando International Airport property, as well as an easement to build track between the station and the mainline to the coast.

For the initial opening of the line, it is single-tracked for most of the route. However all its bridges and infrastructure are designed for two tracks, thus making future upgrading easier.

=== Maintenance ===
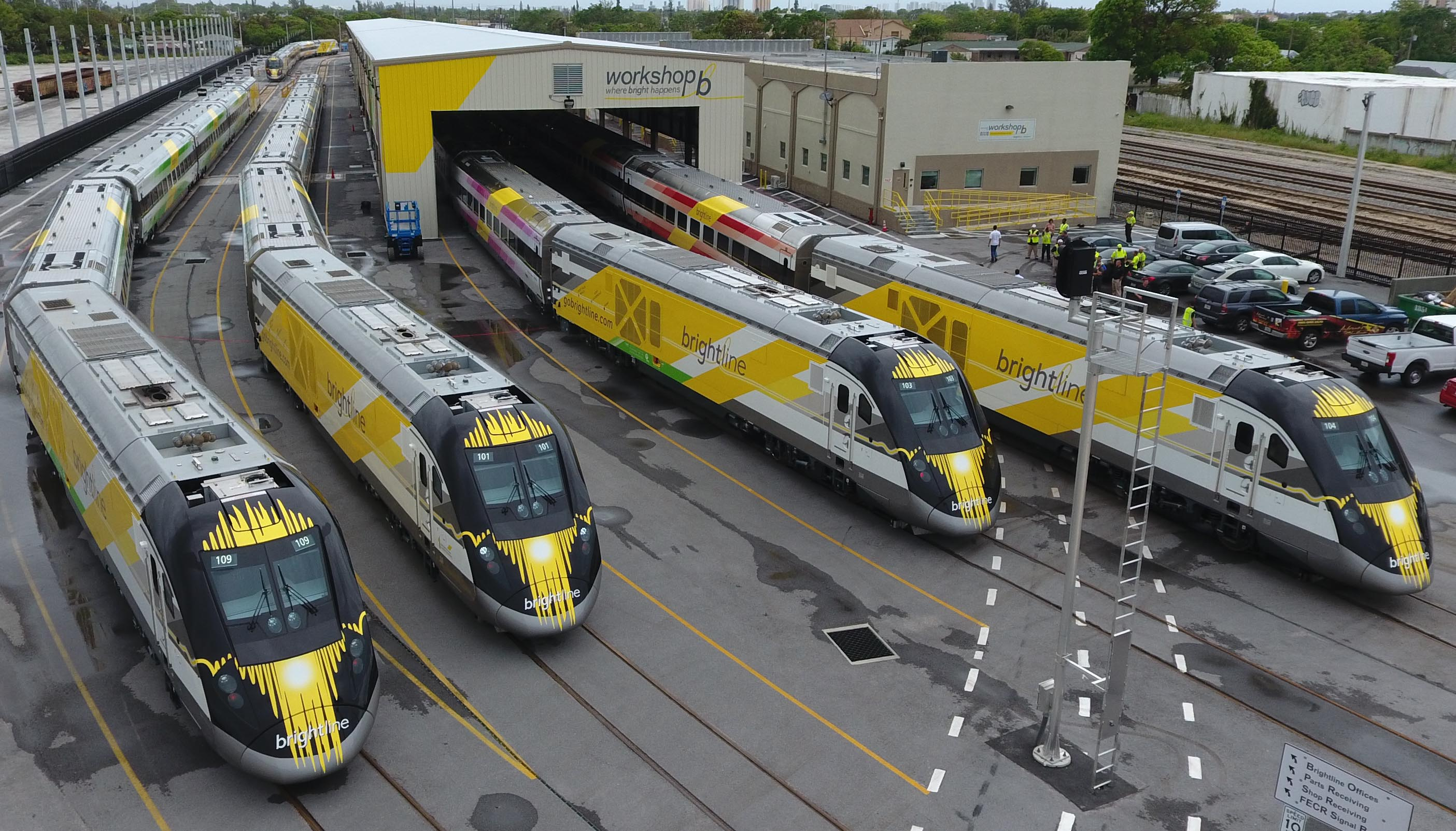
Brightline trains at Workshop b near the West Palm Beach station

Brightline has two maintenance facilities. Their primary vehicle maintenance facility, Basecamp, is located near the Orlando International Airport and opened in early 2023 to commission and service trains prior to the beginning of service to Orlando.

Brightline's secondary Running Repair Facility, Workshop b, is located north of the West Palm Beach station, and designed for maintenance and minor repair work that does not require the train to be removed from service. The facility includes a maintenance pit for accessing the underside of the trains and can handle up to four 10-car train sets.

== Rolling stock ==
All Aboard Florida ordered five Siemens trainsets in 2014. Each Brightline trainset initially consisted of four 85-foot-long (26 m) Siemens Venture passenger coaches, with a Siemens Charger SCB-40 diesel-electric locomotive top and tailed on each end. The coaches, with interiors designed by the LAB at Rockwell Group, feature ergonomic seating, Wi-Fi, and level boarding, and meet ADA standards. Each four-car trainset holds 248 passengers. Working with All Aboard Florida, the LAB also conceived the Brightline name, brand platform, and visual identity.

The entire trainset, including passenger cars, was manufactured by Siemens in its solar-powered plant in Florin, California. Brightline's plan originally called for the trainsets to be expanded to seven coaches each, and five more complete trainsets would be purchased once the route to Orlando went into operation. The first of five trainsets departed the Siemens factory on December 8, 2016, arriving in West Palm Beach on December 14. The fifth trainset arrived in South Florida in October 2017. The final of the additional five trainsets for the Orlando service arrived in February 2023, with these trainsets having only four coaches each instead of the planned seven. In 2023, an additional 20 cars were purchased to expand the existing four-car trainsets. They were extended to five-car sets in 2024 and six-car sets in 2025. Brightline expanded some trainsets to ten cars in 2026

Locomotives were painted in a yellow and white paint scheme with gray horizontal stripes and black front of a cab, while passenger cars were painted in a multi-colored paint scheme with a primary bright hue — red, orange, pink, green or blue, with a yellow diagonal stripe in the center and white areas at the edges, as well as a dark gray horizontal stripe at window level. Each four-car trainset initially had cars of only one color, but after the trains were lengthened, cars of several colors began to be coupled in a single trainset. After a time, some passenger trainsets have been wrapped in a new special themed liveries. The most notable example is the "Freedom Express" ten-car trainset wrapped in special deep blue and red livery.

The trains have two classes of service, with one "Premium" coach and three "Smart" coaches on each trainset. "Premium" has 2x1 and four-to-a-table seating with 50 21-inch-wide (530 mm) seats per car and complimentary snacks and beverages. Each of the slightly less-expensive "Smart" fare coaches has 66 narrower 19-inch-wide (480 mm) seats, with snacks and beverages available for purchase.

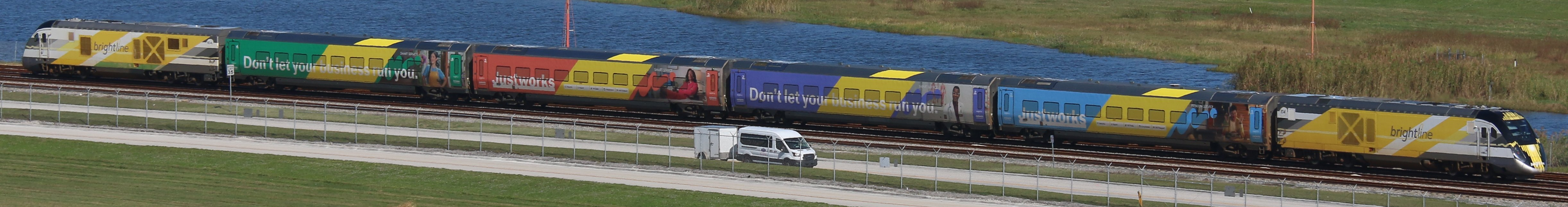
A Brightline train with two yellow SCB-40 Charger locomotives and four Venture coaches of different colors — green, red, purple and light-blue

Model	Year	Total		Nos.	Power	Weight	Seating
Siemens Charger; SCB-40 locomotives	2017	10 units		101–110	4,000 hp (3,000 kW)	267,000 lb (121,000 kg)	—N/a
Siemens Charger; SCB-40 locomotives	2023	11 units		111–121	4,000 hp (3,000 kW)	267,000 lb (121,000 kg)	—N/a
Siemens Venture trainsets	2017	40 units (+30 future units)	5 four-car trainsets	201–205 (Premium), 401–405, 431–440 (Smart)	unpowered	112,000 lb (50,802 kg) per coach	248 (50 Premium, 198 Smart) per four-car trainset
Siemens Venture trainsets	2023	40 units (+30 future units)	5 four-car trainsets	206–210 (Premium), 406–410, 441–450 (Smart)	unpowered	112,000 lb (50,802 kg) per coach	248 (50 Premium, 198 Smart) per four-car trainset
Siemens Venture trainsets	2025	40 units (+30 future units)	30 cars in production to lengthen existing trainsets	TBA	unpowered	112,000 lb (50,802 kg) per coach	TBA

== Collisions and incidents ==
Since shortly after it began service in Florida in 2018, Brightline's trains have been involved in collisions with motorists, pedestrians and cyclists, causing injuries and deaths. From 2018 to December 21, 2025, a total of 196 deaths involved collisions with Brightline trains. As of July 2025, Brightline had the highest fatality rate per mile traveled of any passenger railroad in the United States. Law enforcement and federal reports have found that the deaths were not caused by train crew error or faulty equipment, but were all related to either suicides or people trying to cross the tracks and beat the trains. Outside railroad experts add that the problem lies with Floridians, used to trying to beat slower freight trains on the line, and not the new higher speed passenger trains.

A 27-year-old in Pompano Beach and a 56-year-old in Hollywood were killed in a two-day period in April 2022, both being caused by drivers going around lowered train gates. A video from April 2023 showed a train colliding with a trailer of luxury cars that had become stuck on the tracks. A homeless man was killed by a Brightline train in a suspected suicide on September 28, 2023, just days after the line was extended to Orlando.

Three people were killed in two separate incidents on January 10 and 12, 2024 at the same crossing in Melbourne, both caused by drivers who drove around lowered safety gates. On December 28, 2024, a Brightline train collided with a Delray Beach Fire Rescue fire truck at a grade crossing in downtown Delray Beach after the fire crew illegally drove around lowered gates. Three firefighters and twelve passengers were injured as a result.

There are various reasons for the high number of collisions involving Brightline trains in Florida. As a joint WLRN/Miami Herald investigative report published in July 2025 stated, the train "runs almost entirely at street level, traverses crossings at high speeds, doesn't sound its horn along much of the route and cuts repeatedly through high-volume intersections." More specifically, the report noted that:

- Brightline trains travel at much higher speeds than the freight trains which operate on nearby parallel tracks. Between Miami and West Palm Beach, a built-up region, Brightline top speeds can reach 79 miles per hour (127 km/h).
- Almost all of Brightline's track between Miami and Cocoa is at street level, with many street-level crossings and few bridges or underpasses.
- Locally-mandated "quiet zones", which cover much of Brightline's South Florida operations, prevent trains from sounding a warning horn — as they normally would when nearing a crossing — except in emergencies.
- Pedestrians are significantly more at risk of being hit by a Brightline train than those in vehicles. Of 182 deaths cited in the report, about 41% were ruled suicides as of July 2025, with 50% being accidental, 5.5% of undetermined origin, and 3.2% then still pending.

Fully 60 percent of the deaths resulting from collisions with Brightline trains involved pedestrians attempting to cross the tracks at locations other than rail crossings, reflecting the lack of fencing along much of the line. In many other countries – for example, Germany – grade level crossings are not allowed to exist where trains faster than 100 miles per hour (160 km/h) pass through, and in Japan – a nation very heavily reliant on rail transport – lines with grade crossings are restricted to 80 miles per hour (130 km/h) maximum.

Notably, as of late 2025, not a single fatal collision has occurred along the 36 miles (58 km) section of the Brightline corridor from Cocoa to Orlando International Airport. Safety experts point out that this is because this portion of the route is surrounded by six-foot-high chain link fence and never crosses a road at grade.

=== National Transportation Safety Board investigations ===
- Fatal Grade Crossing Crash between Sport Utility Vehicle and Intercity Passenger Train – February 8, 2023
- Fatal Grade Crossing Crash between Pickup Truck and Intercity Passenger Train — January 12, 2024

== See also ==
- Transportation in Florida
- Transportation in South Florida
- Florida high speed rail
