= Northeast Corridor Rapid Transit Project =

Proposed commuter rail service in Florida

Overview
- Status: In planning
- Locale: Greater Miami
- Termini: MiamiCentral; Aventura
- Stations: 7

Service
- Type: Commuter rail
- Operator(s): Brightline; Florida East Coast Railway

History
- Planned opening: 2032 (estimate)

Technical
- Character: At-grade
- Track gauge: 4 ft 8 1/2 in (1,435 mm) standard gauge
- Operating speed: 79 mph (130 km/h)
Route map
Proposed route highlighted in blue

The Northeast Corridor Rapid Transit Project is a planned commuter rail service in Miami-Dade County, Florida. The line is planned to extend from MiamiCentral to the Aventura station along the existing Florida East Coast Railway (FEC) tracks. It will have seven stations for the service in Miami-Dade, with both of the terminal stations having access to Brightline. Service could begin as soon as 2032. Tri-Rail is a potential operator of the service. A future extension into Broward and Palm Beach County is under study.

== History ==
Prior to Brightline, a similar project was known as the Coastal Link in the 2010s with Tri-Rail as the prospective operator.

In 2020, it was revealed that Brightline was planning a commuter rail service to complement their existing intercity service. Referred to as the Northeast Corridor, trains would run between MiamiCentral and Aventura with five stations between. Brightline and the Miami-Dade County Commission agreed to access fees in November 2020. The estimated cost for full buildout of the line was $325 million in 2021. Operations were expected to start as early as 2024. By 2023, station locations had been identified and service frequencies for trains were expected to be every 30 to 60 minutes. The price of the project had increased to $588,663,000. As of 2024, the project now has an estimated cost of $927,300,000, with service starting as soon as 2032, as the result of the Federal Transit Administration indicating to "slow down" the pace of the project.

== Stations ==
Location	Station	Connections
Ojus	Aventura	Brightline; Metrobus: 3, 9, 95, 100, 183, 199, 203, BALHVL; Broward County Transit: 1, 28, 101
North Miami Beach	FIU/Biscayne; NE 151st St	
North Miami	North Miami; NE 123rd St	
Miami	NE 61st St; Little Haiti	
Miami	NE 39th St; Design District	
Miami	NE 27th St; Wynwood	
Miami	MiamiCentral	Brightline; Tri-Rail; Metrorail: Green Orange; Metromover: Omni Brickell Inner; Metrobus: 2, 3, 7, 9, 11, 21, 77, 95, 100, 203, 207, 208, 400, 401, 836, 837; Broward County Transit: 109, 110

== See also ==
- Transportation in South Florida
