= Flagler Global Logistics =

Company in Florida, United States

- Type: Private company
- Industry: Logistics, cold chain supply, shipping, real estate
- Founded: April 2013
- Headquarters: Coral Gables, Florida,
- Website: www.flaglergl.com

Flagler Global Logistics is a Coral Gables, Florida, United States–based company that offers integrated third-party logistics, supply chain management solutions, and is the state's largest developer of industrial real estate.

Flagler Global Logistics owns a number of strategic assets throughout Florida. This includes land with rail, seaport, and airport connectivity suitable for industrial development.

A wholly owned subsidiary of Florida East Coast Industries, the company was originally incorporated as South Florida Logistics Services before changing its name in 2013.

== History ==
Flagler Global Logistics can trace its roots back to the original railroad and land development company founded by pioneering American businessman Henry M. Flagler in 1892. Flagler, who helped found Standard Oil, saw Florida's tourism potential and built a network of rail lines, depots, and associated infrastructure that eventually extended all the way from Jacksonville to Key West. As Florida's east coast was still lightly settled, Flagler was able to obtain wide swaths of land up and down the coast, including large tracts of property in what became Miami.

After a long bankruptcy that began in 1931, Florida East Coast Railway was purchased by the Alfred I. duPont Testamentary Trust and operated as part of the St. Joe Company. In 1983, St. Joe's incorporated FOXX Holdings, which became the parent company of both Florida East Coast Railway and the railroad's new real estate arm, Flagler Development Company. FOXX was renamed Florida East Coast Industries in April 2000. In 2007, Florida East Coast Industries was purchased by Fortress Investment for $3.5 billion, and shortly afterwards, Florida East Coast Railway was spun off into a separate and distinct company from Florida East Coast Industries.

To better take advantage of its strategic land holdings, and provide scalable third-party logistics, Florida East Coast Industries established South Florida Logistics Services as an LLC in Delaware in April 2013. The company officially incorporated in the state of Florida in May 2013.

In November 2013, the company underwent a rebranding and changed its name from South Florida Logistics Services to Flagler Global Logistics.

== Services ==
Flagler Global Logistics offers consolidation and deconsolidation, multimodal transportation, warehouse management, Foreign Trade Zone, and dry and refrigerated cargo services, as well as commercial real estate development.

FGL is the only company with direct connectivity to PortMiami, Port Everglades, and Miami International Airport.

FGL currently operates or is developing, six Class-A logistics and distribution facilities throughout Florida. In total, FGL's assets include more than 1 million square feet of move-in ready, Class-A warehouse and distribution space, as well as more than 2,000 gross acres of land holdings throughout Florida that could accommodate nearly 24 million square feet of industrial development.

Flagler Global Logistics flagship multimodal distribution complex—South Florida Logistics Center—is located adjacent to the Miami International Airport, with exclusive rail connectivity via the Florida East Coast Railway to South Florida's busiest ports—PortMiami and Port Everglades.

The more-than-200-acre South Florida Logistics Center opened in November 2013. Its centerpiece is Flagler Global Logistics’ cold-chain management facility. When fully built out, the center will consist up to 2 million square feet of industrial space. South Florida Logistics Center is an approved magnet site for Foreign Trade Zone No. 281. Tenants include Goodyear and the Flying Food Group.

FGL's other holdings include:

Flagler Station – Located off the Florida Turnpike and NW 106th Street in Miami, Flagler Station is the state's largest business park, with direct access to the Florida East Coast Railway. The facility has been built in phases. FGL is developing the third and final phase, which will include 1.7 million square feet of new warehouse and distribution space and is scheduled to come online in 2015. When finished, the park will hold more than 10 million square feet of business, commercial, and industrial space. Flagler Station is an approved magnet site for Foreign Trade Zone No. 281. Its tenants include Ryder System, FedEx, Crowley, and Carrier.

Titusville Logistics Center – The facility is located on 200 acres that were part of the original Florida East Coast Railway's land holdings. The site features nearly a mile of land directly adjacent to the FECR mainline. The land is permitting for more than 3 million square feet of Class A warehouse and distribution space when the phased build out is complete.

To support its growing cargo business, the Canaveral Port Authority recently leased 246,240 square feet of space at the Titusville Logistics Center.

== Technology ==
Flagler Global Logistics is using a new, proprietary, single-source, cold chain technology to attract more business from Latin and South American importers of perishable goods.

Importers generally use colder northern ports, and then truck the products (which can include fruits, vegetables, and fresh-cut flowers) south in order to protect local farms against fruit flies and other pests. However, this circuitous supply chain route can contribute to large losses in products. Industry reports estimate that $35 billion in perishable foods are lost annually between farm and table, with nearly half of those losses due to in-transit temperature changes.

FGL's new facility allows the company to employ a new cold chain process and treatment methods that can extend the shelf life of produce and other perishable items.

In December 2013, the USDA approved the Logistics Center's treatment methods. Flagler Global Logistics President and CEO Chris Scott described the USDA approval as a “game-changer” in the industry, because it opens up Miami as a viable alternate distribution hub for Latin America exporters.

Flagler Global Logistics also holds certifications from PrimusGFS (Global Food Safety Initiative scheme) and the FDA.
