= Florida East Coast Industries =

American company

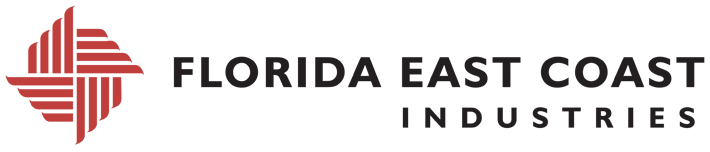
- Type: Private
- Industry: Rail, commercial real estate, logistics
- Founded: 1892
- Headquarters: Coral Gables, Florida
- Owner: Fortress Investment Group
- Website: www.feci.com

Florida East Coast Industries (FECI) is Florida's oldest and largest commercial real estate, transportation, and infrastructure holding company. Based in Coral Gables, FECI is the direct lineal descendant of the various companies founded by pioneering American businessman Henry M. Flagler. FECI today is the parent company of three distinct businesses:

- Brightline, formally known as All Aboard Florida, an inter-city passenger rail line between Miami and Orlando. In addition, the project calls for developing more than 2 million square feet of multi-use real estate space around the stations.
- Flagler Global Logistics, an integrated logistics company that provides multimodal shipping, warehousing and supply chain services; and
- Flagler, a full-service commercial real estate company.

FECI was purchased in 2007 by equity funds managed by Fortress Investment Group, LLC. Although Florida East Coast Railway at one time fell under the FECI umbrella, it is now a completely separate corporate entity owned by Grupo México's GMexico Transportes SAB de CV since 2017.

== History ==
Although FECI did not exist as a corporate entity until 2006, the company's origins date back to December 31, 1888, when Henry Flagler purchased the Jacksonville, St. Augustine and Halifax River Railway. In 1892, Flagler formally merged and incorporated that rail line and a number of additional small railway operations he had purchased, changing the name to the Jacksonville, St. Augustine and Indian River Railway Company. This name change also reflected the extension of rail system south along the east coast of Florida. Convinced of the region's tourism potential, Flagler began laying a network of tracks and depots further and further south, which helped spur the development of the entire east coast of Florida. His rail empire would eventually stretch from Jacksonville to Key West.

On Sept. 7, 1895, Flagler changed his company's name to the Florida East Coast Railway Company (FECR).

Flagler is credited with helping found West Palm Beach in 1894, and helping turn Miami, which in 1896 consisted of about 400 inhabitants, into a thriving city of more than 29,000 residents a generation later. In 1904, Flagler began construction on the Oversea Railway to Key West, which many people thought was an impossible undertaking. The 128 mile-extension was opened on Jan. 22, 1912, just 16 months before Flagler's passing on May 20, 1913.

FECR declared bankruptcy and was placed into receivership in September 1931 following financial difficulties caused by the Stock Market Crash of 1929 and onset of the Great Depression. The company was further rocked by the Labor Day Hurricane of 1935, which partially destroyed the Overseas Railroad.

The company didn't fully emerge from bankruptcy until January 1, 1961. Edward Edward Ball, Chairman of the Alfred I. duPont Testamentary Trust, had been purchasing the bankrupt company's bonds during the Depression through the trust's St. Joe Paper Company, and was awarded majority ownership in 1961.

Later in 1961, shortly after taking over, the FECR and all other American railroads were notified by their non-operating unions that they expected a substantial hourly increase to go into effect at the end of the year. Having had only three profitable years during the thirty years of the bankruptcy, Mr. Ball advised the unions that FECR couldn't afford the industry-wide labor settlement, and asked that the unions work with the railroad and accept the increase over a one-year period. The unions refused, and on January 22, 1963, union employees launched a work stoppage that continued in some form until 1975 and which was marked at times by violence. During the labor strife, FECR brought on replacement workers, and made numerous cost-saving operation changes, such as eliminating cabooses and becoming the first rail line in the nation to operate with two-man crews. In 1968, FECR ended passenger service, which had become unprofitable.

In 1983, St. Joe's incorporated FOXX Holdings, which became the parent company for FECR as well as Flagler (then known as the Flagler Development Company). Foxx Holdings began operating separately from the St. Joe Company in 2000 and was renamed FECI in April 2006.

In 2007, Fortress Investment Group, LLC used private equity funds to purchase FECI for $3.5 billion. Shortly after, Fortress spun off FECR into a separate, distinct company. As part of the deal to separate FECR and FECI, however, FECI retained the right to operate passenger rail service along the FECR corridor.

Florida East Coast Railway was bought out by Grupo México in 2017.

== Leadership ==
Vincent Signorello has served as both President and CEO of FECI since April 2009. He also serves as President of Flagler. Prior to joining FECI he served as a vice-president on Fortress’ private equity team.

Michael Bradish is FECI's Executive Vice President and Chief Financial Officer. His background includes more than 20 years of financial experience, including positions at major real estate investment and development companies in California, such as ProLogis and CB Richard Ellis.

Kolleen O.P. Cobb serves as Executive Vice President and General Counsel. She joined FECI in 2000. Prior to joining FECI, she was an attorney at Hughes Hubbard & Reed LLP, of New York.

Husein Cumber and Rafael Rodon both serve as Executive Vice Presidents for Corporate Development. Cumber, prior to joining FECI in 2012, served in a similar role for FECR. He was the Deputy Chief of Staff at the U.S. Department of Transportation from 2009 to 2010. Rodon has been with FECI since 1988. He has served as Director of the Miami-Dade County Building and Zoning Department, and was a gubernatorial appointee to the Miami-Dade Expressway Authority Board of Directors.
