= Boca Raton Public Library =

Public Library in South Florida

- 26°21′15″N 80°05′21″W
- Location: United States
- Type: Public Library

Collection
- Size: 233,727

Access and use
- Population served: 96,114

Other information
- Budget: $4,944,300
- Employees: 72
- Website: www.myboca.us/957/Library

Downtown Location
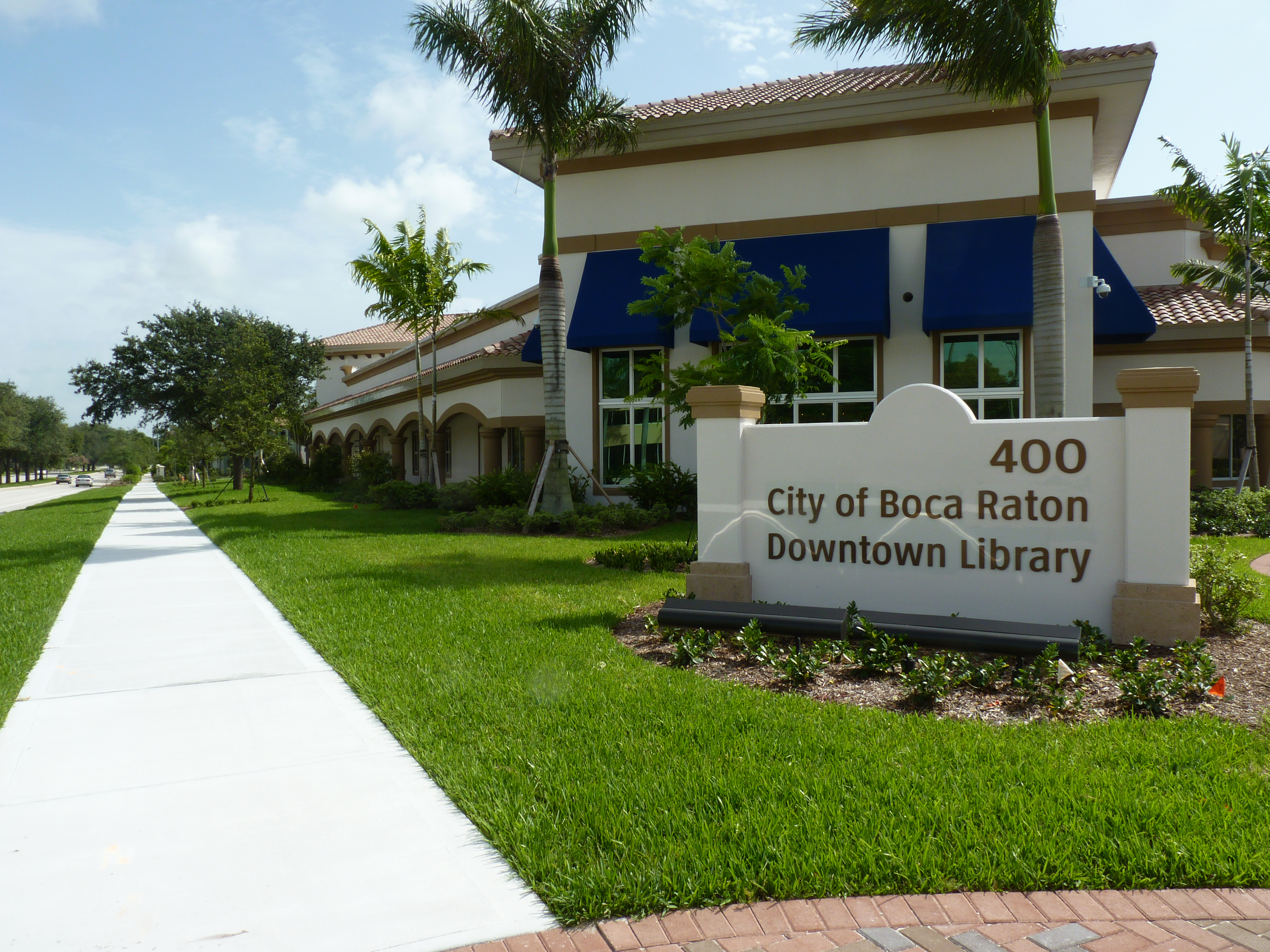
- 26°21′10″N 80°05′23″W
- Location: 400 NW 2nd Ave. Boca Raton, Florida 33432
- Established: Downtown Location built in 1962 with additions in 1972 and 1982. Renovated in 1992. New library constructed one block north of the original library and opened in June 2013.

Other information
- Website: www.myboca.us/957/Library

Spanish River Library and Community Center Location
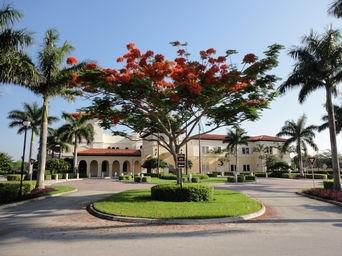
- 26°23′15″N 80°07′04″W
- Location: 1501 NW Spanish River Boulevard, Boca Raton, Florida 33431
- Established: January 26, 2008

Other information
- Website: www.bocalibrary.org

The Boca Raton Public Library consists of two library facilities serving the residents of the incorporated area of Boca Raton, Florida. The City of Boca Raton, incorporated in 1925, is one of the largest and southernmost cities in Palm Beach County, Florida.

== History ==
The Woman's Club of Boca Raton began the first community library in January, 1923. The library was managed by a group of volunteers including Mrs. Charles Stokes, Mrs. W.C. Young, Mrs. Crosby Tappan, and Miss Erma Habercorn. The collection developed from public donations, with Mrs. Morris Stokes and the Friends of The Chicago Public Library specifically cited as being those responsible for donating a large portion of the library's original fiction titles. Other donations resulted from musical performances where the price was one book donated and calls for donations from local figures like Addison Mizner. It was closed in 1926 due to a land bust destroying the local economy following the Florida land boom of the 1920s, and the collection was donated to a local elementary school.

In January, 1946, the community library reopened at the Boca Raton Army Air Field in the Administration Building due to the efforts of Recreational Director of Civilian Personnel, Mrs. Mabel Wood. The reopening was spearheaded by the president of the Woman's Christian and Civic Club, Mrs. Arnold MacSpadden. Other women in the Wives of Army personnel also assisted in reopening the library, holding fundraising efforts and accepting personal donations for the new collection. On opening, the library was staffed by volunteer librarians Myrtle Fleming, Carrie Sperry, Paulette Hebel, Helen Mann, and Birdine Merritt. Severe damage from a category 4 hurricane forced the library to close again in 1947.

In 1948, efforts too reopen another community library succeeded, with the Boca Raton Town Council allocating space for the library within the city's Municipal Building. This also resulted in the first library Board of Directors for the system, created on April 26, 1948 and led by Eleanor Bebout as president. Local citizens Carrie Sperry, Dorothy Cox, Helen Mann, and Myrtle Fleming as the additional board members. By 1950, the library also had its first benefactors, with J. Myer Schine and Hildegarde Schine supporting the library with the donation of new bookcases, fluorescent lights, and other new furnishings.

In the early 1950s, the library hosted several art exhibits as part of a partnership with the Art Guild of Boca Raton. In 1955 a library and cultural arts center was planned on a tract of land donated to the partnership by library benefactors J. Myer and Hildegarde Schine, as part of a million-dollar development on a 25-acre piece of land in downtown Boca Raton; this development did not come to fruition. The Boca Raton library separated from the Art guild in 1957. In the summer of that same year, the Library filed suit to determine ownership rights of the property deeded to the joint partnership, with the library requesting that the property be divided so that each party could use a portion of the land for their own purposes. It was claimed in this lawsuit that the Art Guild never agreed to the deed in its present form due to regulations imposed by the Grantor to which the Art Guild was opposed. The lawsuit went unresolved until January, 1960, when it was decided that the land should be sold for a net sum of $50,000, with $25,000 to be given to each party.

With the help of funding from the city and donations, the library moved to the administration building of the Garden Apartments on West Palmetto Road in 1957. A new library building was completed in 1961 on NW 2nd Avenue, the location of the current Downtown Library. Construction costs for the new building amounted to $41,000. In 1966 this building was dedicated to the city and named the Boca Raton Public Library. Though it was not a public library, it was still subsidized by the city council prior to this dedication. The building subsequently underwent several renovations, including a new library wing in 1972 for a price of $120,000. Additions to the ever-increasing book collections were also made over time, with significant additions being added to the reference, local history, and children's collections. An alarm system was installed in 1976 to prevent theft.

In 1979 the Boca Raton Public Library left the Palm Beach County library system, after the County ended subsidy payments for out-of-city users to use the Boca Raton Public Library and six other city libraries throughout the county. Ever since, users living outside the primary boundaries of the City of Boca Raton have had to pay an annual fee in order to use library services, including to check out books.

A general obligation bond of $6 million was approved by the voters on March 10, 1981, with $1.9 million earmarked for a library expansion project that doubled the size of the library. About $100,000 of that was spent on replacing books in poor condition and increasing the book collection. Additional renovations were made throughout the 1990s, and although several plans were floated to expand the size of the cramped and busy Library once-more, none were actualized. A proposal that would triple the size of the library for a cost of $12.7 million was sent to the voters in 1994, who rejected the measure by 88 votes. In 1995 the library joined the city's City Recreation Services Department, and began to offer online services. Self checkout was introduced in 1999, as was the computerized system that replaced the card catalog.

In 2003 Boca Raton voters overwhelmingly approved a $19.8 million bond issue for the building of two new library buildings, after a decade of proposals and plans to expand the library being considered. The first building, located at 1501 Spanish River Boulevard, opened on January 26, 2008, and is known as the Spanish River Library and Community Center. The second building was constructed on Boca Raton Boulevard, a block north of the original Boca Raton Downtown Library, and opened in June 2013.

=== Milestones ===
The public library celebrated its 50th birthday in May 1975, with check-outs increasing to over 190,000 times that year despite the economic downturn. In 1999, the library hit a milestone of lending out 500,000 items in a single year. Its 75th birthday was celebrated in May 2023.

=== Friends of the library ===
The Friends of the Library were established in 1979, with the goals of bringing money to the Library, supporting legislation related to libraries, co-operating with library staff in improving and expanding services, and helping the library obtain materials and funds. They incorporated in 1981, and started hosting book sales in 1980. They were reorganized in 1999 after several years of inactivity, and opened a used book store in 2007.

== Facilities ==
=== Present location ===
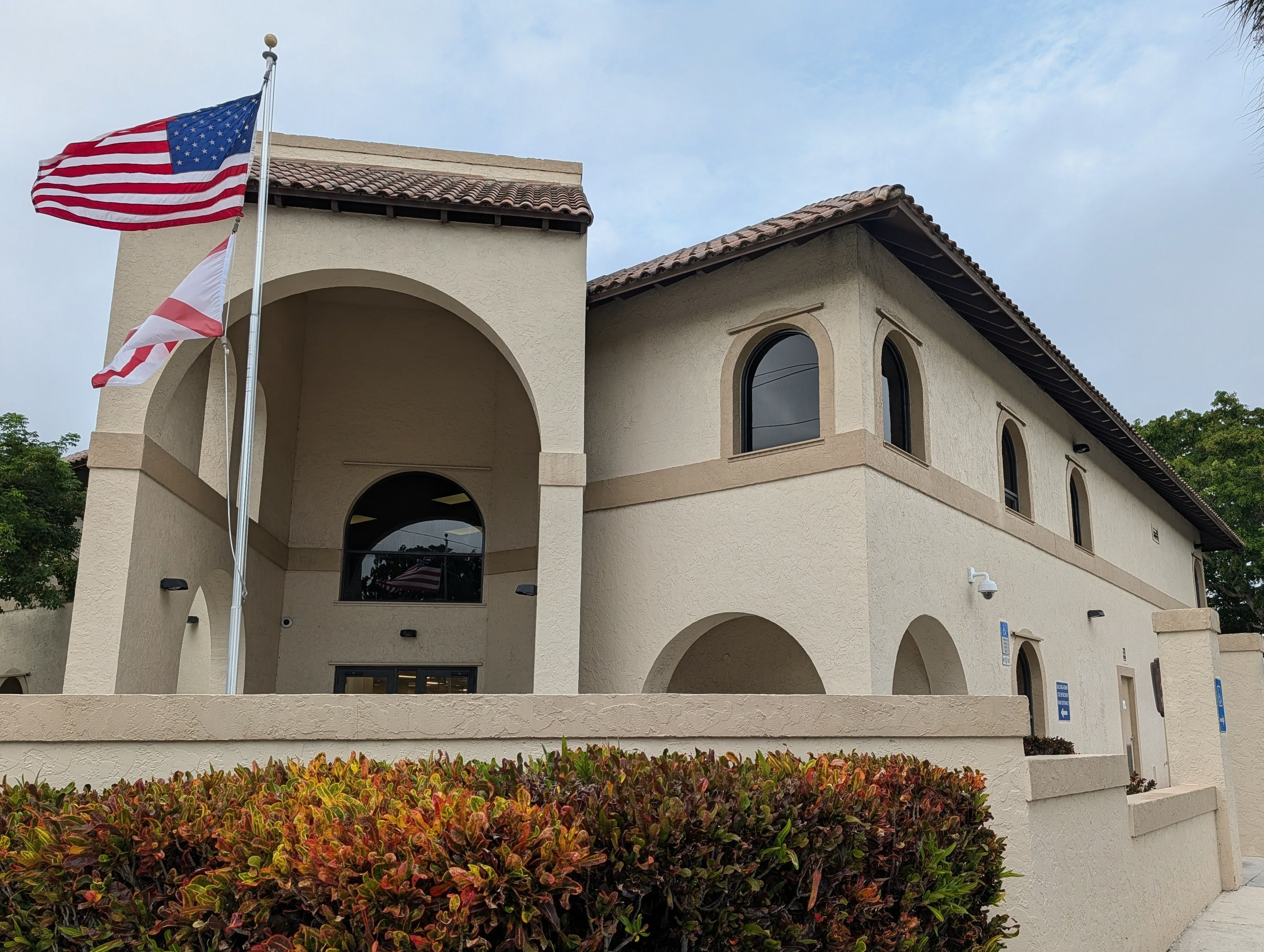
Original Downtown Boca Raton Public Library building and current office of Building Administration and Code Enforcement.

The Boca Raton Library has two locations to serve the residents of incorporated Boca Raton. The New Boca Raton Downtown Library (41,932 square feet) is at 400 N.W. Boca Raton Boulevard. The Spanish River Library and Community Center (40,940 square feet) is located at 1501 N.W. Spanish River Boulevard. The Spanish River Library, built in the Addison Mizner (1872-1933) style, additionally provides public space for meetings, gatherings, and events. The hours of the library are posted on the library web site. The Old Downtown Library (21,400 square feet) was located at 200 N.W. Boca Raton Boulevard.

Groundbreaking for the new 41,932 square foot Boca Raton Downtown Library took place on April 24, 2012. The new library was designed by PGAL of Boca Raton in the Mediterranean architectural style of Addison Mizner (1872-1933). The Downtown Library has been built in line with Leadership in Energy and Environmental Design (LEED) Silver certification requirements. The new Boca Raton Downtown Library was officially opened with a ribbon cutting ceremony and celebration on June 22, 2013. The 42,000 square foot building features 70 public access computers, study rooms, and events space.

=== Discover studio and other programs ===
The Boca Raton Public Library opened the Discover Studio within the Downtown location in September 2015. The Studio was funded by the Friends of the Boca Raton Public Library. The Discover Studio utilizes a pop-up space model to teach emerging technologies, including photo and film editing, music production and audio podcasting, sublimation equipment, Cricut equipment, and a variety of other programs. Classes are taught by qualified librarian instructors and outside expert instructors. The Discover Studio is a part of the library's involvement in community education. All classes are free with a valid library card. The library hosts several other programs and classes each year, along with a library of things and a digital library to accompany its standard collection. The Library has also served as an early voting site in past elections. The Boca Raton Library hosted the first Florida State Girls Championship February 4, 2023 at their Spanish River location.

== Library advisors and supporters ==
- The Friends of the Boca Raton Public Library is a 501(c) charity and a volunteer and fundraising group dedicated to supporting community cultural programs. The Friends operate a used bookstore at the Boca Raton Public Library's Downtown location, with proceeds benefiting the library.
- The Boca Raton Public Library Board advises the City Council on the management and operation of the Boca Raton Public Library. Board members are appointed for three-year terms and meet monthly.

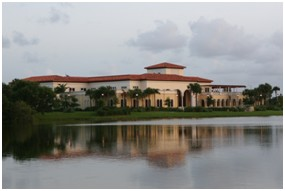
Spanish River Library and Community Center Lakeside Patio and Rooftop Terrace

== Works cited ==
- Kuster, Richard J.; Trevino, Marcella Bush; Wendy, Margaret C.; Engel, Jane (December 2007). "A Chronicle of the Boca Raton Public Library 1923-2007" (PDF). The Spanish River Papers. 20. Boca Raton Public Library. Archived (PDF) from the original on 16 June 2023.
