= Orlando International Airport Intermodal Terminal =

Intermodal transport hub in Orlando, Florida

Orlando
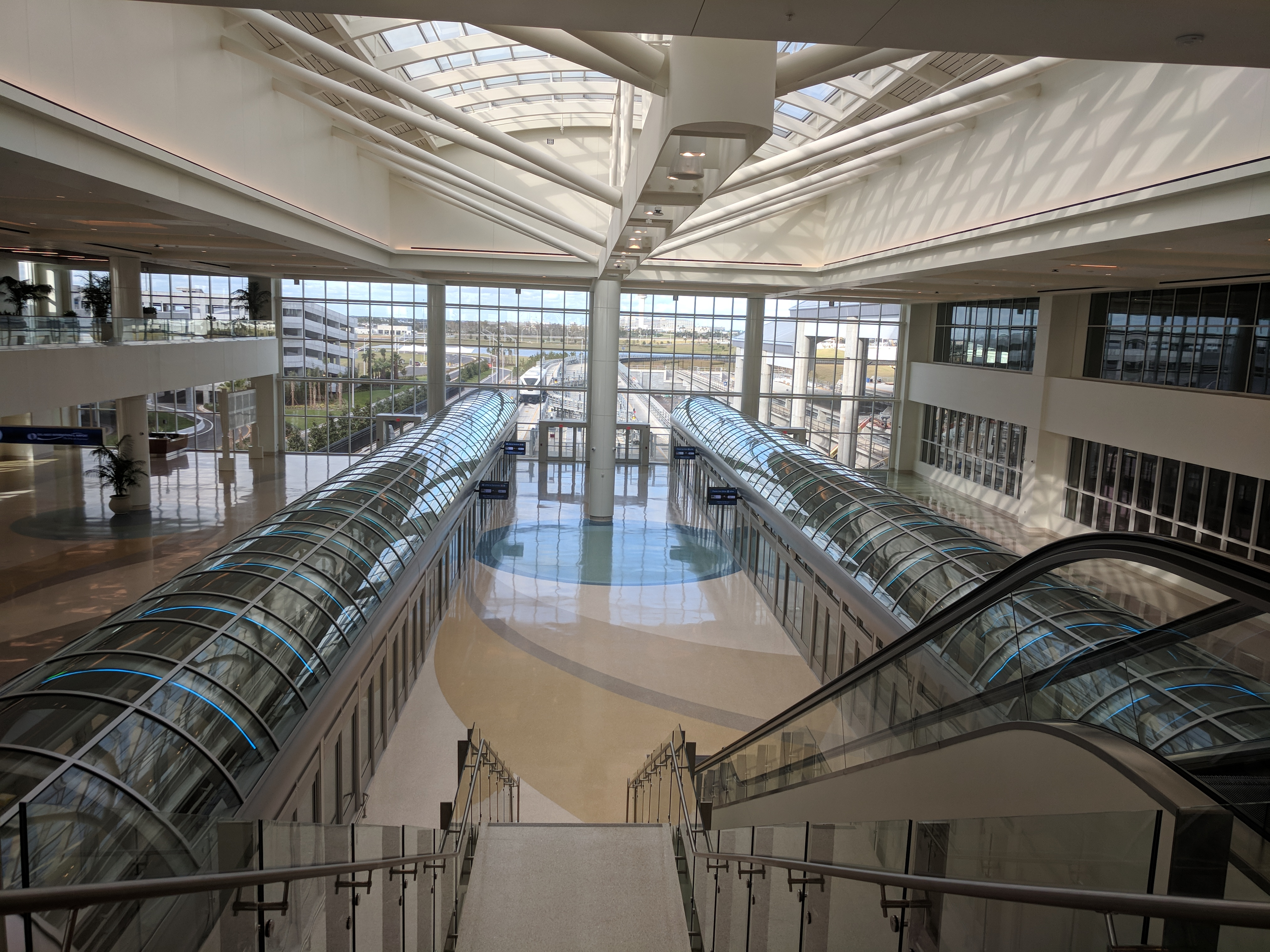
- The station for the automated people movers to the main terminal

General information
- Other names: Brightline Orlando Station; South Airport Intermodal Terminal
- Location: 1 Jeff Fuqua Boulevard; Orlando, Florida; United States
- Coordinates: 28.41453°N 81.30818°W
- Owner: Greater Orlando Aviation Authority (GOAA)
- Platforms: 1 island platform 4 side platforms
- Tracks: 4

Construction
- Structure type: Elevated
- Parking: 2,400 spaces; paid
- Accessible: Yes

History
- Opened: November 17, 2017; September 22, 2023 (Brightline)

Services
Preceding station	Brightline	Following station
Terminus	Brightline	West Palm Beach toward MiamiCentral
Future services
Preceding station	SunRail	Following station
OCCC toward International Drive South	SunRail Sunshine Corridor (proposed)	Terminus
Route map
Location

The Orlando International Airport Intermodal Terminal, also known as the Brightline Orlando Station and South Airport Intermodal Terminal, is an intermodal passenger transport hub located at Orlando International Airport in Orlando, Florida. The complex, which was partially funded by the Florida Department of Transportation, is the current terminus of Brightline, an inter-city rail service which provides service to Miami via the Florida East Coast Railway. Brightline codes the station as ORL in routing.

The terminal building and the adjacent parking garage opened on November 17, 2017. The facility is connected to the main airport terminal roughly 1 mile (1.6 km) to the north via an automated people mover (APM) system. Brightline began revenue service to the complex on September 22, 2023.

== History ==
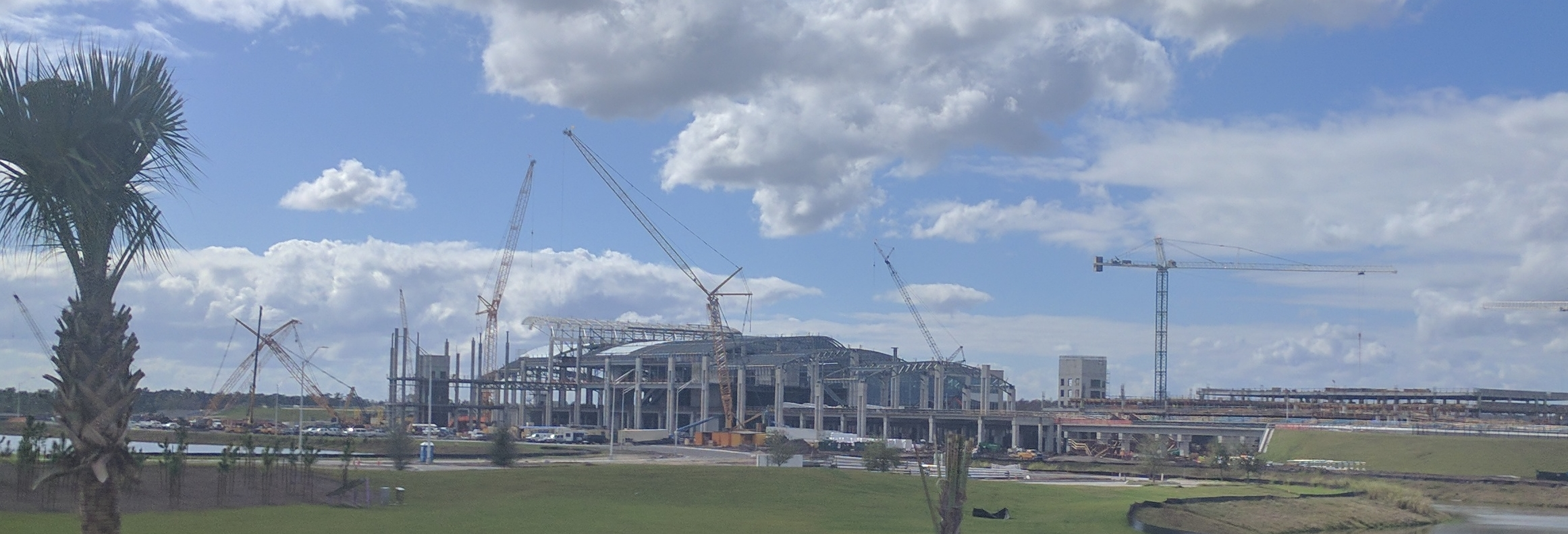
Orlando International Airport Intermodal Terminal under construction (2017)

The facility mostly reuses plans from the proposed Florida High Speed Rail system. In that plan, the Orlando International Airport station was to be the northern terminus of the initial Tampa-to-Orlando route along Interstate 4. The plan was effectively cancelled when Florida governor Rick Scott announced he would reject federal funding for the project. The Greater Orlando Aviation Authority had already invested considerably in improvements to accommodate the station and high-speed rail line, such as the extra length of the south taxiway bridges over the southern airport access road, which is now used by Brightline. As part of the $684 million intermodal complex, the airport authority has also built a 2,400 space parking garage.

== Future use ==
The SunRail commuter rail line is considering a 5.5-mile (8.9 km) extension to the airport terminal. The extension would travel 3.5 miles (5.6 km) from the existing SunRail line along an Orlando Utilities Commission rail spur, which runs along the southern boundary of the airport's property. The route is used exclusively by coal trains to serve the Curtis H. Stanton Energy Center in eastern Orange County. From there, two options are currently under consideration; one plan would have SunRail trains branch north off of the existing OUC line and onto a new 2-mile (3.2 km) spur that would terminate at the Airport Intermodal Terminal. The second option being explored would be to build a transfer station along the OUC line where passengers would transfer from SunRail trains onto light rail trains that would run along a dedicated 2-mile line between the transfer and airport stations.

In addition to Brightline and SunRail, the station might also serve one of two proposed rail connections to International Drive. There were plans for an elevated maglev train system, but those were scrapped in 2015. The current plan is for a light rail line that would most likely connect the airport and with the Orange County Convention Center, Florida Mall, and the Sand Lake Road SunRail station before reaching International Drive.

== See also ==
- Miami Intermodal Center
