= EMD GP49 =

Diesel locomotive model in the GP unit family

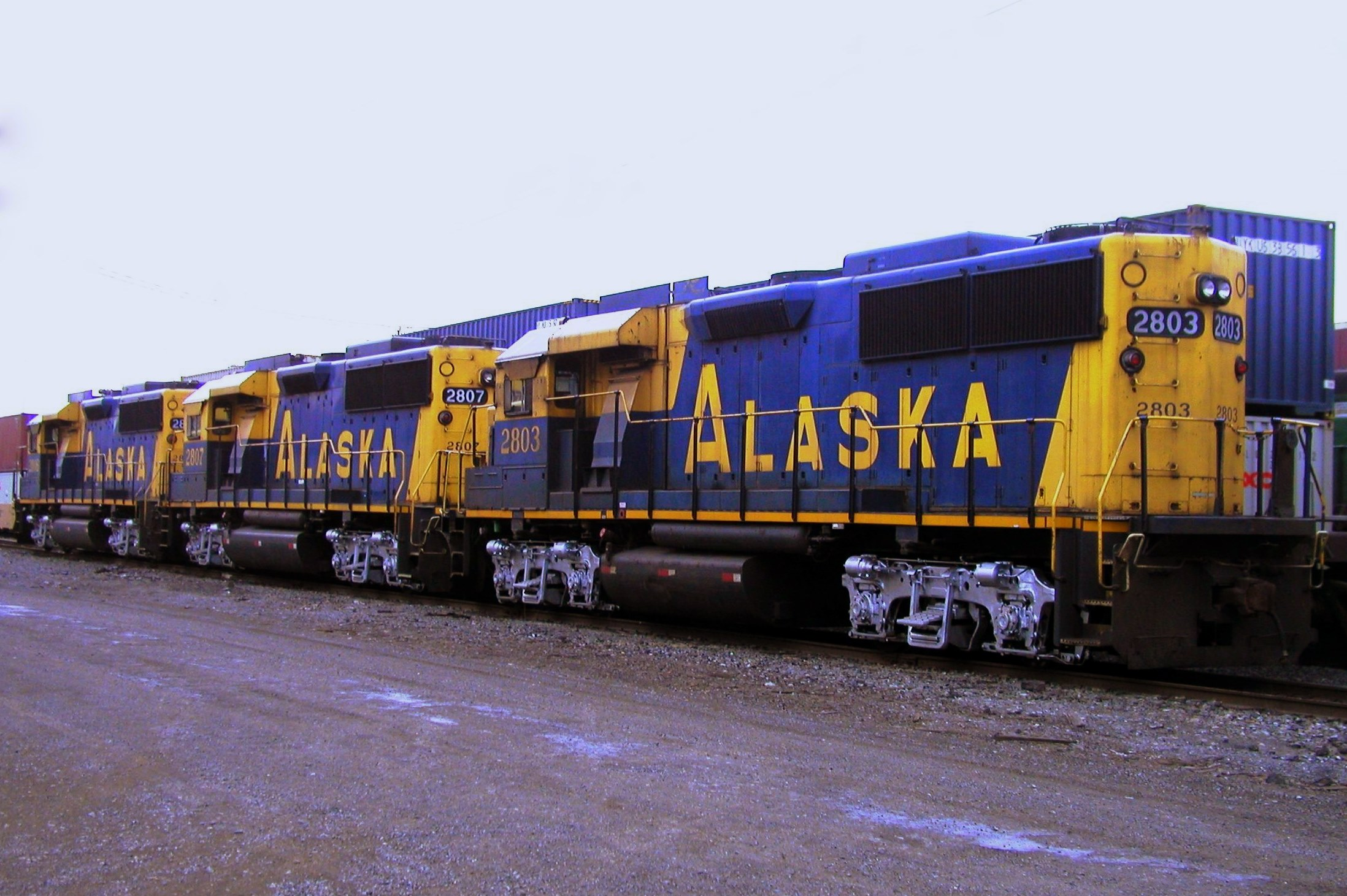
- Alaska Railroad GP49s in Seattle
Type and origin
- Power type: Diesel-electric
- Builder: General Motors Electro-Motive Division
- Model: GP49
- Build date: September 1983 - May 1985
- Total produced: 9
Specifications
- Configuration
  - AAR: B-B
  - UIC: Bo'Bo'
- Gauge: 4 ft 8 1/2 in (1,435 mm); 1,000 mm (3 ft 3 3/8 in), Chile
- Prime mover: EMD 12-645F3B
- Engine type: V12 diesel
- Cylinders: 12
Performance figures
- Power output: 2,800 hp (2.09 MW)
Career
- Operators: Alaska Railroad
- Disposition: Several still in service on other railroads

The EMD GP49 is a 4-axle diesel locomotive built by General Motors Electro-Motive Division. Power was provided by an EMD 645F3B 12-cylinder engine which generated 2,800 horsepower (2.09 MW). The GP49 was marketed as one of four models in the 50 series introduced in 1979. The 50 series includes GP/SD49 and GP/SD50. Both the GP and SD50 were relatively popular with a total of 278 GP50s and 427 SD50s built. The SD49 was advertised but never built and a total of nine GP49s were built.

Alaska Railroad was the sole customer that ordered the GP49. In two orders, the company first bought locomotives 2801–2804 in September 1983; locomotives 2805-2809 were subsequently built in May 1985. Six GP39Xs were built in November 1980 for the Southern Railway and upgraded to GP49s shortly thereafter.

== Performance ==
While possessing a fairly high power rating (total of 2,950 hp or 2.20 MW), the traction horsepower was rated at 2,800 hp (2.09 MW) while 150 hp (110 kW) was used to run the onboard appliances. The GP49 is known for its slow acceleration, this was due to the radar unit that is mounted under the front pilot to monitor the actual ground speed when the engine is moving to prevent wheel slip. This system is known as EMD's Super Series wheel slip control that was introduced on the GP40X. It tells the engine's computer to slow the speed of the motors to prevent wheel slip. The GP49 is equipped with a 12-645F3B engine with an AR15 alternator rated at 4680 amperes and has four D87 traction motors. Externally the GP49 looks like a GP50 but has two 48" fans above the radiator instead of three as on the GP50, and the engine room has eight access doors on each side under the Dynamic Brake blister for engine and turbocharger maintenance, whereas the GP50 has ten.

== Current use ==
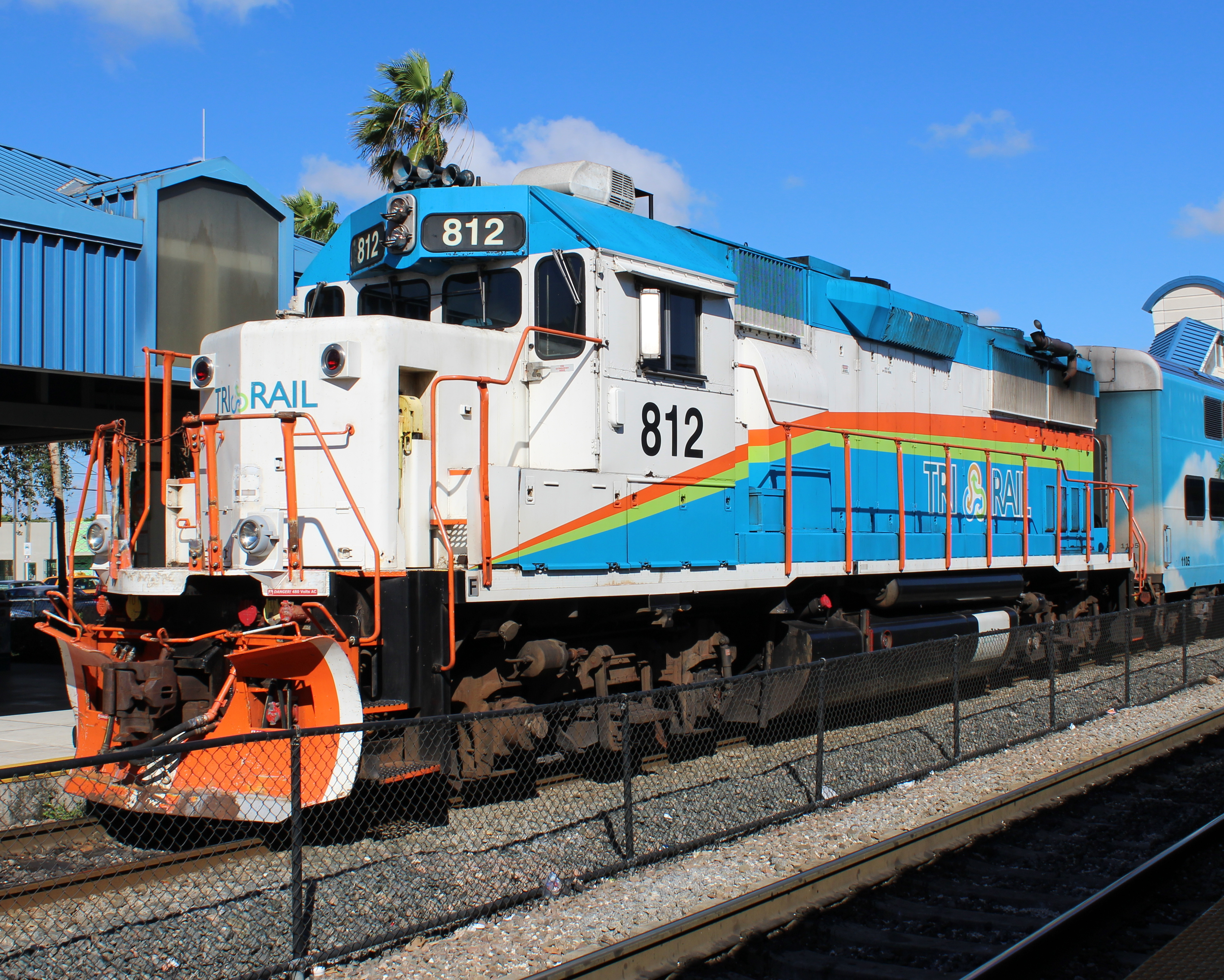
Tri-Rail EMD GP49H-3 stopped at Tri-Rail and Metrorail Transfer station.

In December 2006, the Alaska Railroad auctioned five units (numbers 2801, 2803, 2804, 2806, and 2807) plus parts; Helm Leasing was the winning bidder with a bid of $1.3 million. The Alaska Railroad's four remaining units (2802, 2805, 2808, and 2809) were still in service as of March 2007. As of July 2014, units 2803, 2806, and 2807 had been acquired by Frontier Rail and assigned to the new Cincinnati East Terminal Railway in Southwestern Ohio.

The units 2805 and 2808 are now part of the fleet of one of the biggest Chilean freight operators, Ferronor and were modified into 6-axle units. They are based out of the Llanos de Soto Workshops of Ferronor S.A, where they operate in Ferronor Vallenar iron ore trains from Los Colorados Mine to the Guacolda Port in Huasco, Chile. Both work with slugs rebuilt from General Electric U9C engines. 2801 and 2802 are now part of the locomotive fleet of TRANSAP, a Chilean railway. They were refitted with A1A bogies, to reduce axle load.

Columbia Rail has four: Columbia-Walla Walla Railway operates four GP49s (2802, 2806, 2807, 2809) on the former Blue Mountain Railroad lines in and around Walla Walla.

Tri-Rail in Florida purchased Norfolk Southern's six GP49 variants (ex-GP39X units) for use on commuter trains in Florida. The company had them remanufactured for passenger service by Mid-America Car Company and re-designated GP49H-3. Work included the addition of a head-end power system, extended-range dynamic braking, single-shoe brakes, locomotive-cab air conditioning, a reduced-capacity fuel tank for improved weight balance, and conversion from long-hood-forward to short-hood-forward operation, with the high short hoods lowered. As of January 2026, three remain in service and are scheduled to be retired in 2029, to be replaced by a order of Siemens Chargers.
