= Hialeah Market station =

Railway station in Hialeah, Florida, US

Hialeah Market

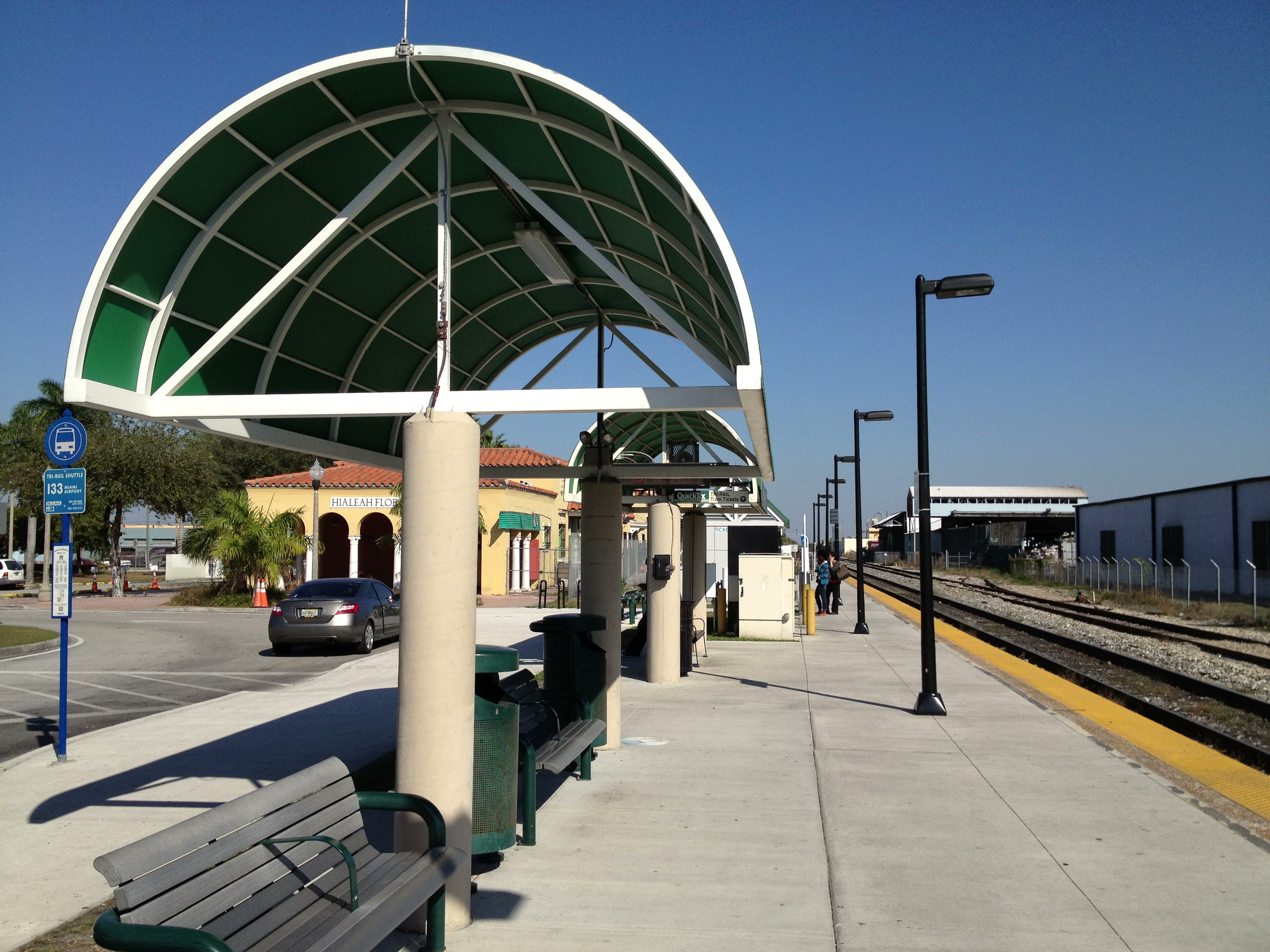

General information
- Location: 1200 SE 11th Avenue; Hialeah, Florida
- Coordinates: 25°48′42″N 80°15′32″W
- Platforms: 1 side platform
- Tracks: 2
- Connections: Metrobus: 132

Construction
- Parking: Yes
- Accessible: Yes

Other information
- Fare zone: Miami–Golden Glades

History
- Opened: January 9, 1989
- Former names: Hialeah Market Miami International Airport (1989–2015)

Services
| Preceding station | Tri-Rail | Following station |
|---|---|---|
| Miami Airport Terminus | Main Line | Metrorail Transfer toward Mangonia Park |
Location

Hialeah Market is a Tri-Rail commuter rail Station in Hialeah, Florida. Station is located at Southeast 10th Court near Southeast 14th Street, opening in January 1989 as Miami Airport Station. It was the southern terminus of Tri-Rail line until a new Station was built closer to the airport in 1998. The name was changed to Hialeah Market Station at this point. The other Miami Airport Station was closed in September 12, 2011, and this Station's name was changed to Hialeah Market/Miami Airport Station. The name was changed back to Hialeah Market Station again in 2015 after Tri-Rail began to serve Miami Airport station. Parking is available at this Station. Immediately north of the station is the historic Hialeah Seaboard Air Line Railway Station.

== Station layout ==
The station has two tracks, and only one side platform. The station building, parking, and bus stops are west of the platform.

== Places of interest ==
- Hialeah Seaboard Air Line Railway Station
