= Fort Lauderdale Airport station =

Tri-Rail station in Dania Beach, Florida

Ft. Lauderdale Airport

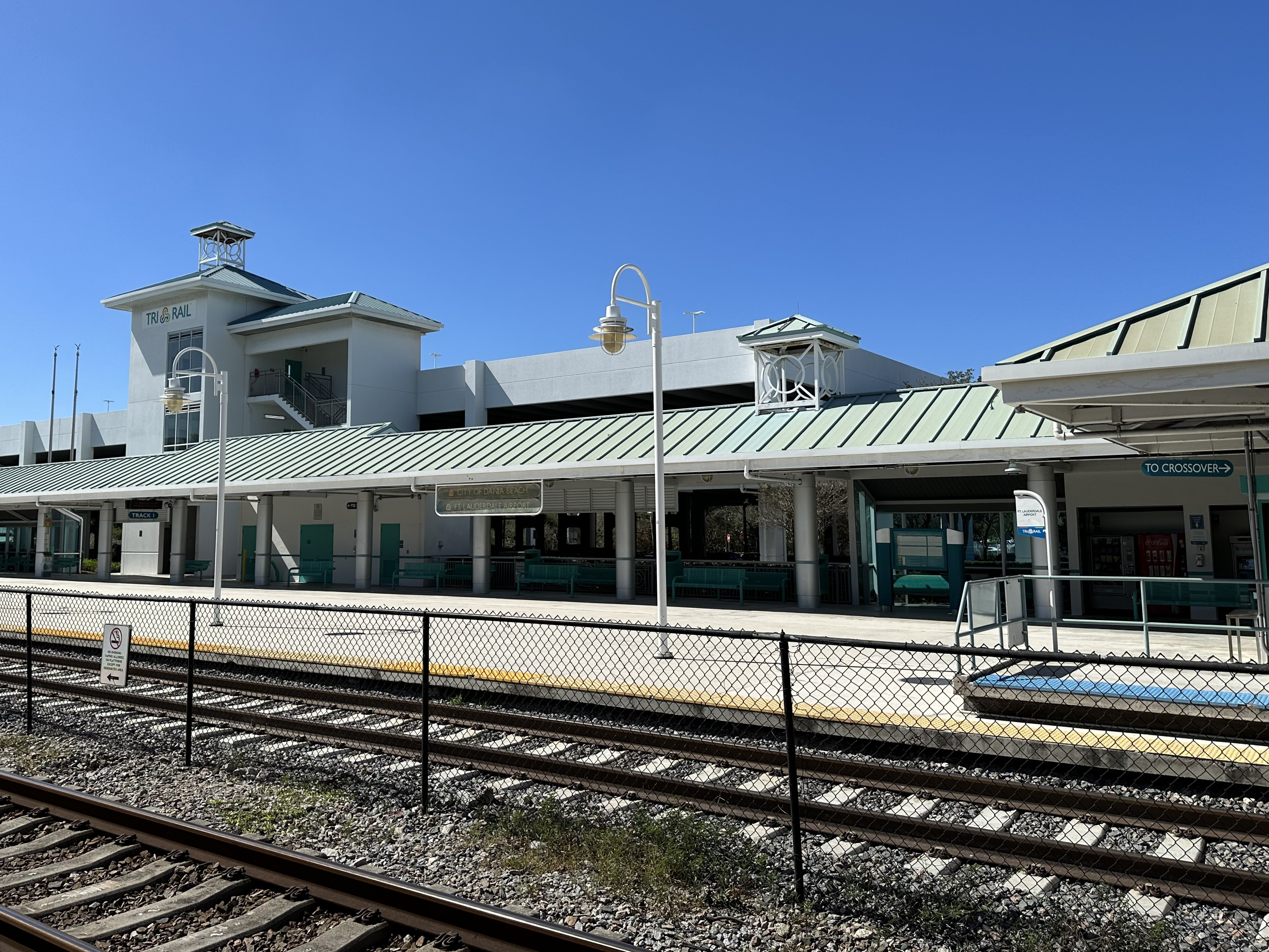
- The station building in 2023

General information
- Location: 500 Gulfstream Way; Dania Beach, Florida
- Coordinates: 26°03′42″N 80°09′56″W
- Line: South Florida Rail Corridor
- Platforms: 2 side platforms
- Tracks: 2
- Connections: Broward County Transit: 4, 6, 15, 595 Express; SFEC Shuttle

Construction
- Accessible: Yes

Other information
- Fare zone: Fort Lauderdale Airport–Hollywood

History
- Opened: March 10, 1989
- Rebuilt: July 17, 1989; August 14, 2000

Services
Preceding station	Tri-Rail	Following station
Sheridan Street toward Miami Airport	Main Line	Fort Lauderdale toward Mangonia Park
Metrorail Transfer toward MiamiCentral	Express	Boca Raton toward West Palm Beach
Location

Fort Lauderdale/Hollywood International Airport at Dania Beach station, or more commonly Fort Lauderdale Airport station, is a Tri-Rail commuter rail station in Dania Beach, Florida, located just west of Fort Lauderdale–Hollywood International Airport. The station is located at Gulfstream Way, adjacent to the interchange of Interstate 95 and Griffin Road (SR 818). The station has two side platforms. A parking garage is located west of the southbound platform, while a small parking lot is east of the northbound platform. A pedestrian grade crossing connects between the two platforms at the north end of the station.

== History ==
The Tri-Rail system was originally built with a Fort Lauderdale Airport station on Ravenswood Boulevard (Anglers Avenue) at SW 36th Street (Collins Road) at a cost of $806,000. It was directly across Interstate 95 from the airport's main runway. On January 3, 1989 – six days before the system opened on January 9 – Broward County aviation officials objected to the station being opened because it was located in the clear zone around the runway. (The Federal Aviation Administration did not object, as that agency's authority extended only to regulating the height of structures near airports.) County commissioners then voted not to operate connecting bus service to the station and Tri-Rail postponed opening of the station. Due to internal miscommunication, some trains served the station on January 8.

Florida Department of Transportation and Broward County officials clashed over which agency was responsible for the station being built in the clear zone. Tri-Rail opened the station on March 10, 1989, promoting the county to vote on March 14 to withdraw support – which would have forced Tri-Rail to stop running – unless the station was closed. Local commentators called it a political maneuver, noting that frequently-congested I-95 was even closer to the runway than the station. The Tri-Rail board voted on March 17 to close the station on March 23. It temporarily reopened in May 1989 when the runway was closed for resurfacing. A replacement station opened at Tigertail Boulevard, about 1.7 miles (2.7 km) to the south, on July 17, 1989, at a cost of $268,000.

In 1996, the town of Dania Beach and Broward County swapped land to allow the county to build an access road to a new station site and the International Game Fish Association Hall of Fame and Museum. The new station, located about 1/2 mile (0.80 km) north of the Tigertail Road station site, opened on August 14, 2000. It was formally dedicated four days later. More elaborate than the earlier stations, the $3.3 million facility included octagonal pavilions, larger canopies, and a 200-space parking lot. Tri-Rail opened a 400-space parking garage at the station – the first parking garage on the system – in October 2010 to ease a parking shortage.
