= Tri-Rail =

Commuter rail service in South Florida

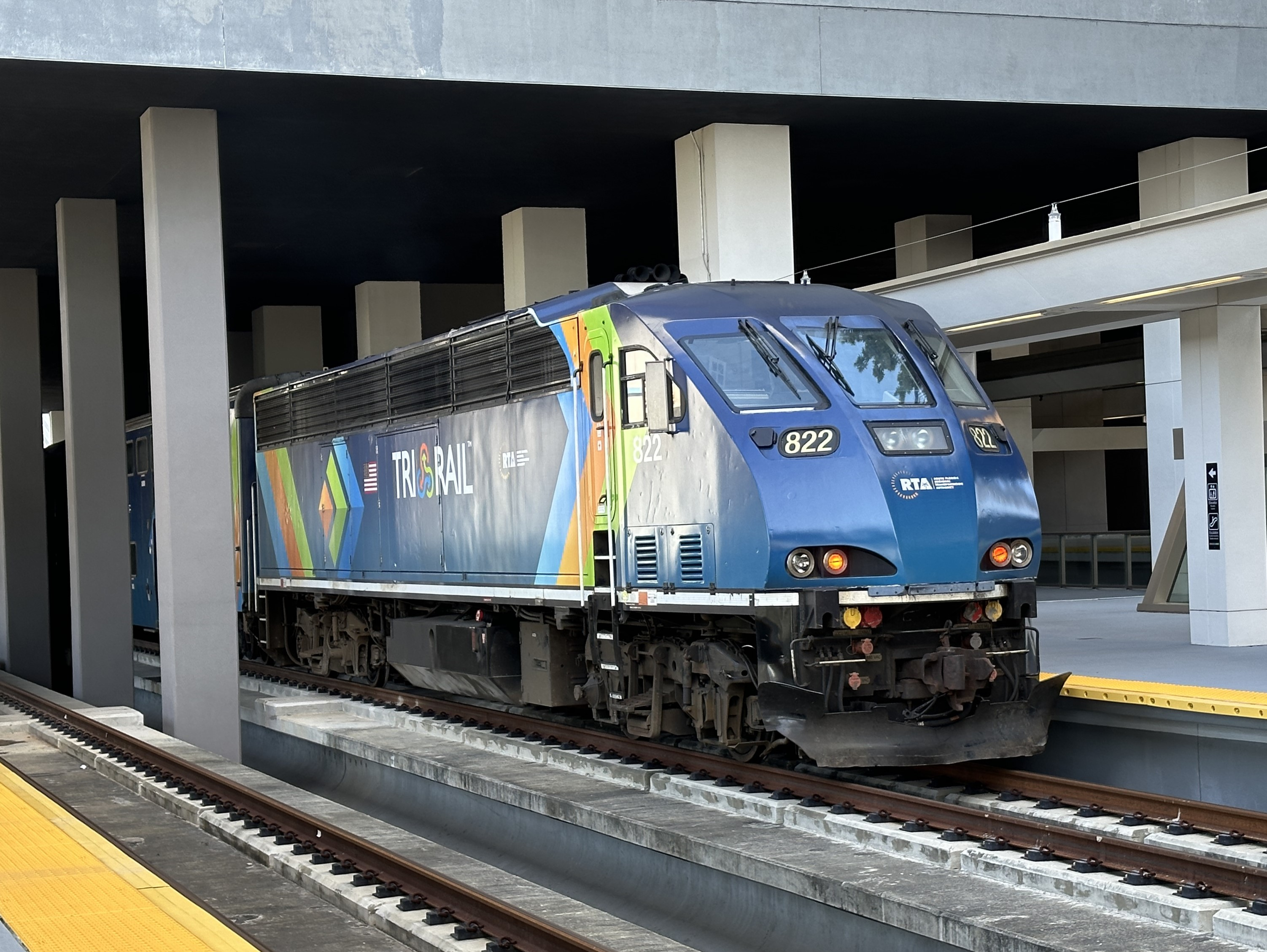
- A Tri-Rail train at MiamiCentral

Overview
- Owner: South Florida Regional Transportation Authority
- Locale: Greater Miami
- Termini: Mangonia Park; Miami Airport MiamiCentral
- Stations: 19
- Website: tri-rail.com

Service
- Type: Commuter rail
- Operator: Herzog Transit Services
- Daily ridership: 13,400 (weekdays, Q2 2026)
- Ridership: 4,924,100 (2025)

History
- Opened: January 9, 1989; 37 years ago

Technical
- Line length: 80 mi (128.7 km)
- Character: At-grade
- Track gauge: 4 ft 8 1/2 in (1,435 mm) standard gauge
- Operating speed: Avg.: 38 mph (61 km/h); Top: 79 mph (127 km/h)
Route map
Tri-Rail highlighted in teal

Tri-Rail (reporting mark TRCX) is a commuter rail service linking Miami, Fort Lauderdale and West Palm Beach in Florida, United States. The Tri prefix in the name refers to the three counties served by the railroad: Palm Beach, Broward, and Miami-Dade. Tri-Rail is managed by the South Florida Regional Transportation Authority (SFRTA) along CSX Transportation's former Miami Subdivision; the line is now wholly owned by the Florida Department of Transportation. The 80-mile-long (128.7 km) system has 19 stations along the Southeast Florida coast, and connects directly to Amtrak at numerous stations, to Metrorail at the Metrorail Transfer station, Miami Airport station, and MiamiCentral, and to Brightline at MiamiCentral.

In 2025, the line had a ridership of 4,924,100, or about 13,400 per weekday as of the second quarter of 2026.

A second Tri-Rail line on the Florida East Coast Railway corridor, dubbed the "Coastal Link", has been proposed. The line would operate between Toney Penna station in Jupiter and MiamiCentral in Downtown Miami, and add commuter rail service between the downtown areas of cities between West Palm Beach and Miami. Combined with the existing Tri-Rail line, this expanded Tri-Rail system is estimated to have a daily passenger ridership of almost 30,000; or approximately 9 million passengers per annum, doubling Tri-Rail's current ridership.

== History ==
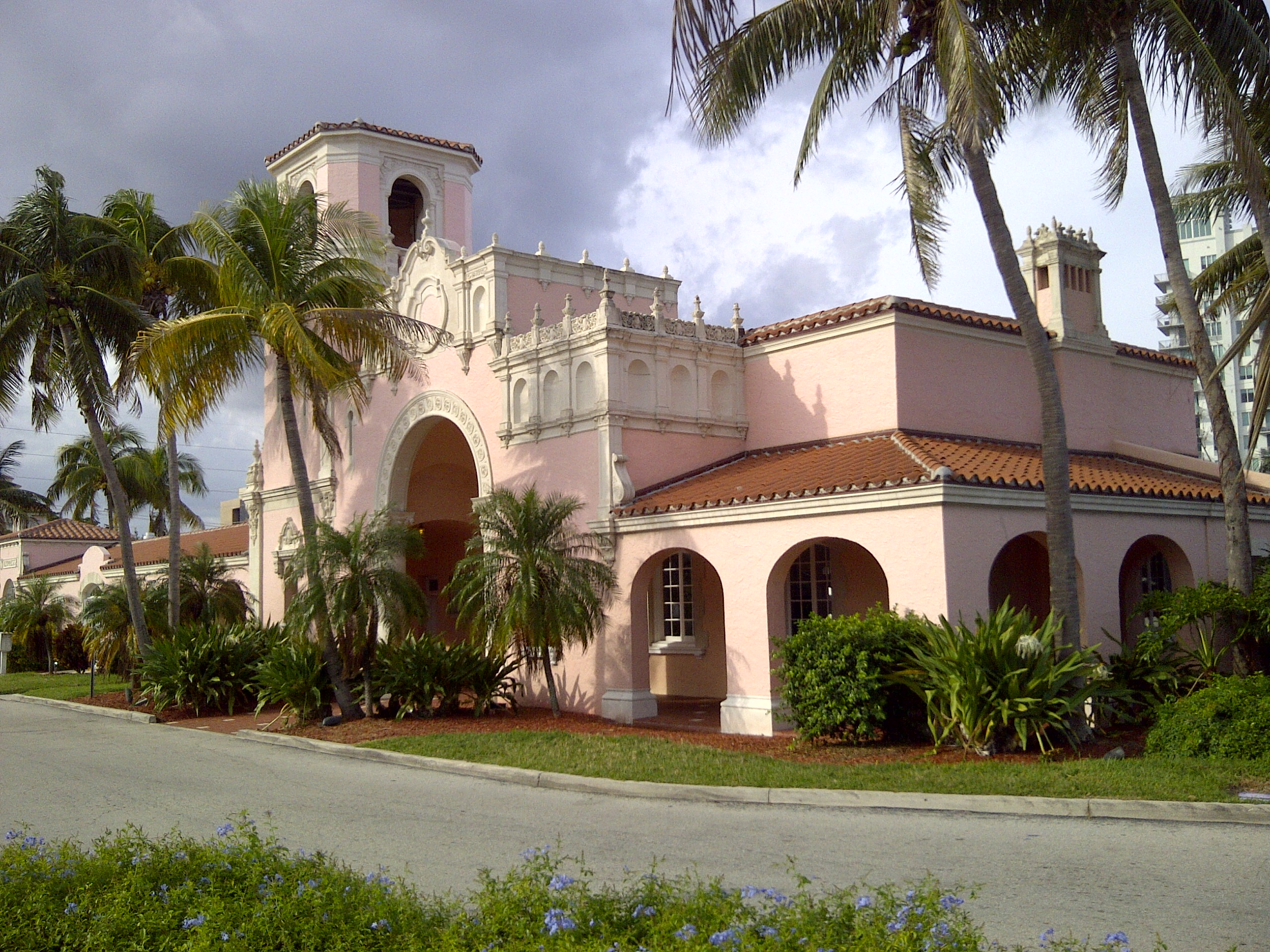
The West Palm Beach station, built in 1925, is one of the many original stations built by the Seaboard-All Florida Railway in the 1920s. Today, these stations are used by Tri-Rail and Amtrak.

=== 1920s: Seaboard–All Florida Railway ===
The line on which Tri-Rail operates was built by the Seaboard–All Florida Railway (a subsidiary of the Seaboard Air Line Railroad) for intercity passenger rail service in the early 1920s. The line was inaugurated on January 7, 1927. Intercity rail service by Seaboard operated the Orange Blossom Special service from New York City until 1953. Amtrak continues to offer passenger rail service with the Floridian train from Chicago and Silver Meteor train from New York City. Today, the original 1920s Seaboard stations are used by Tri-Rail for service at West Palm Beach, Deerfield Beach, Fort Lauderdale, and Hollywood. Though no longer in use, the Seaboard stations at Delray Beach, Opa-locka, and Hialeah are still standing.

=== 1980s–1990s: Planning and inauguration ===
Alex Penelas (mayor of Miami Dade, at furthest left) with other officials at a February 1999 press conference announcing a federal funding grant for Tri-Rail improvements

Planning for a new commuter rail line began in 1983, and building the organization began in 1986. The current system was formed by the Florida Department of Transportation and began operation January 9, 1989, to provide temporary commuter rail service while construction crews widened Interstate 95 and the parallel Florida's Turnpike. Tri-Rail was free from opening until June 1, 1989.

Due to higher than expected ridership, FDOT made Tri-Rail a permanent service, adding more trains and stations in the process. The state's original plan was to use the more urban Florida East Coast Railway (FEC) line, but FEC declined the offer as it wanted freight to be their top priority. In 1998, the initial 67-mile-long (108 km) route was extended north from the West Palm Beach station to the Mangonia Park, and south from Hialeah Market to Miami Airport (at an earlier station on the site of the current station). Construction of the extensions began in 1996; which added nearly 4 miles (6.4 km) to the system.

=== 2000s: New stations, more service ===
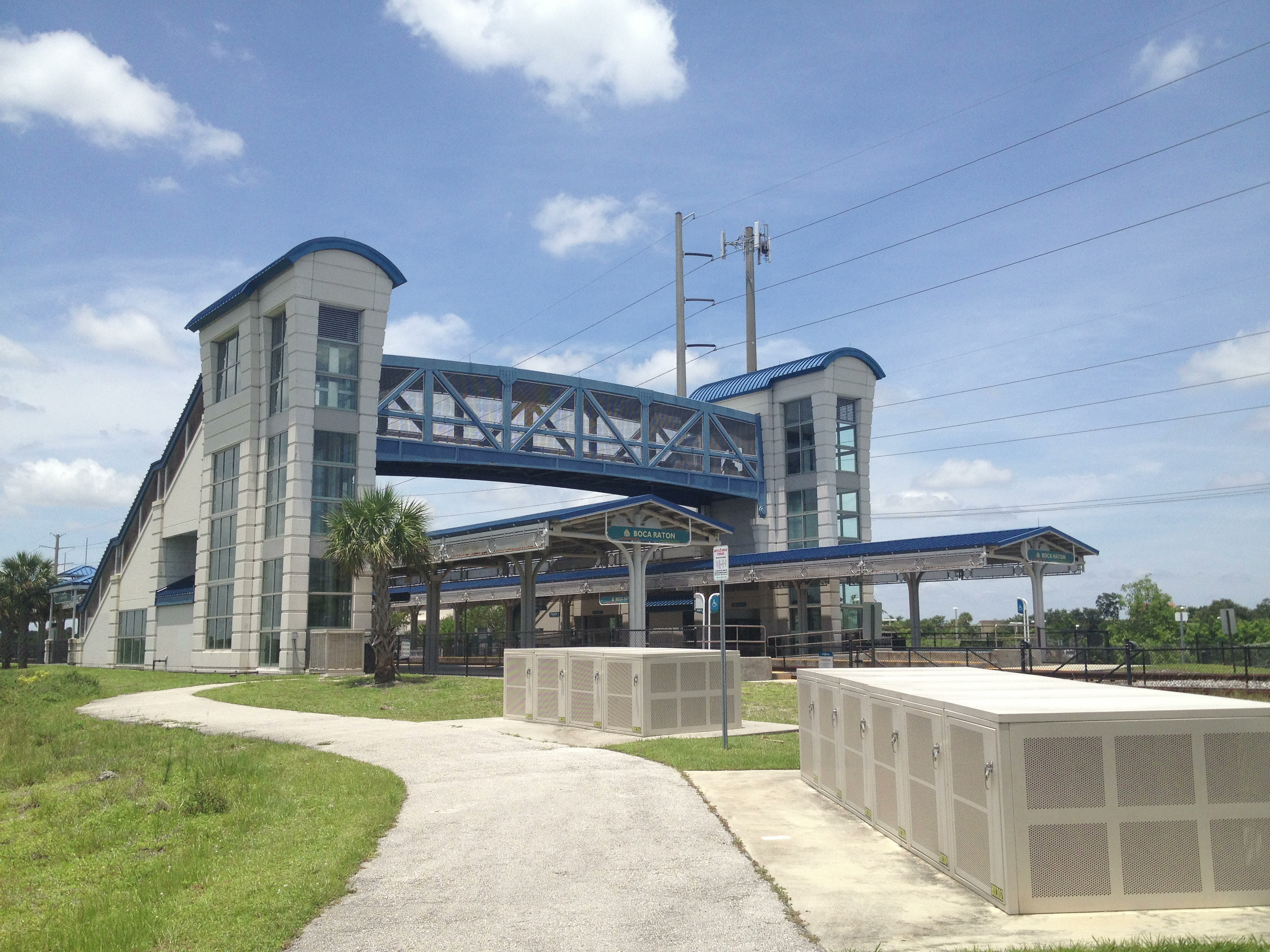
Boca Raton's Tri-Rail station, an example of the mid-2000s rebuilt that includes double track platforms and a pedestrian overpass

In the early 2000s, Tri-Rail received a budget of $84.8 million for double tracking, building extensions, improving stations, establishing a headquarters, and linking to buses.

In 2001, Tri-Rail unveiled its "blue skies, white clouds, and palm tree" livery. Previously, Tri-Rail's passenger coaches were painted in the same green and white scheme used by GO Transit in Canada.

In 2002, Tri-Rail began to upgrade its grade crossings to include raised medians and/or four quadrant gates to prevent cars from driving around them in an attempt to beat trains. This decreases accidents and allows the cities they run through to petition for them not to use their whistle between 10 p.m. and 6 a.m. They also decreased headways to 20 minutes during rush hours.

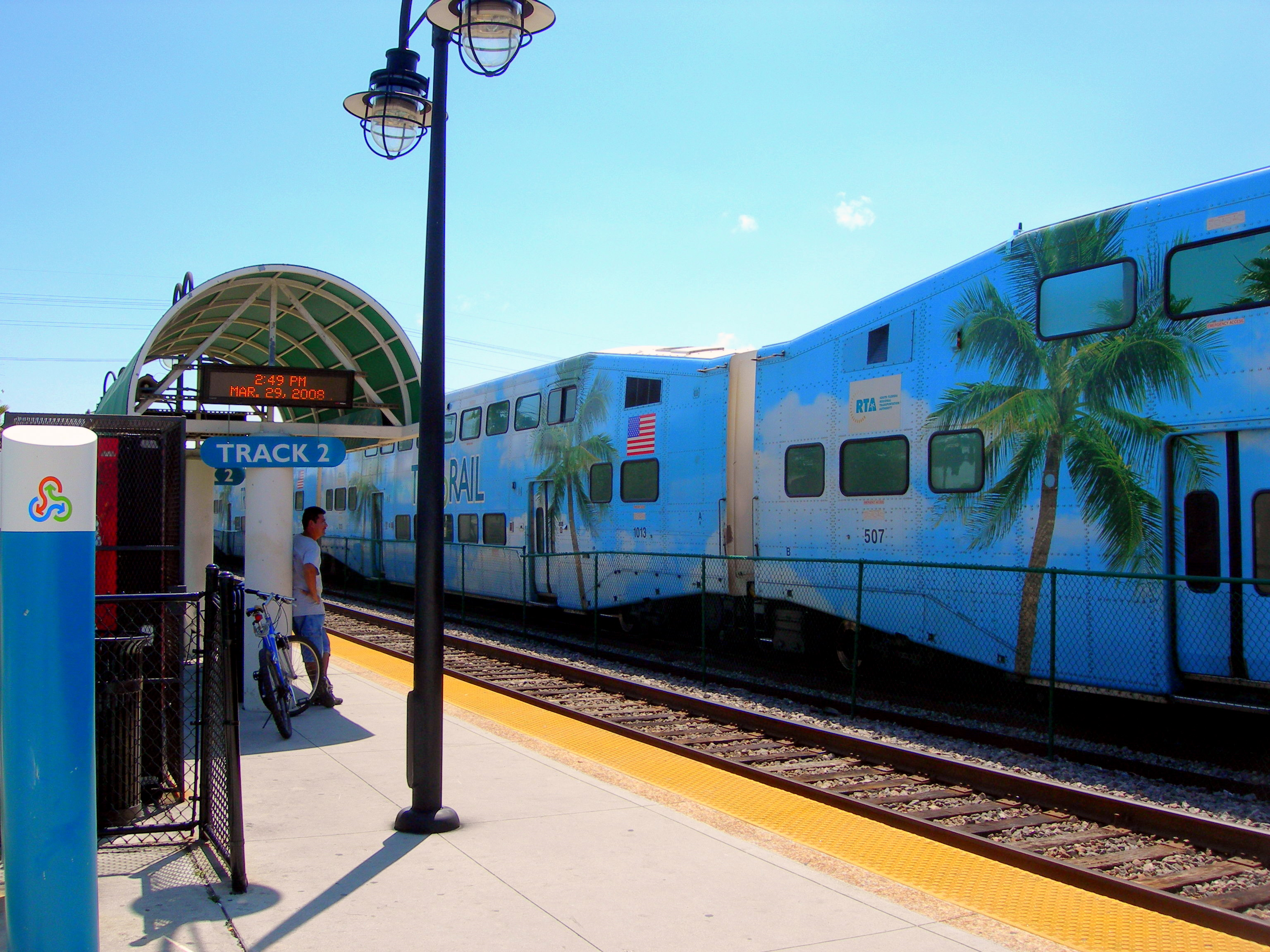
The Pompano Beach station—slated for rebuild—was not renovated or rebuilt during Tri-Rail's double-tracking but was redone later in the 2010s.

In 2007, a project to upgrade the full length of the line from Mangonia Park to Miami Airport with double track was completed with the opening of a high-level fixed bridge over the New River near Fort Lauderdale. During the 2000s, most of the stations were completely rebuilt to accommodate for double-tracking and include dual platforms, elevators, pedestrian bridges over the tracks, large roofs over the platforms, and better facilities.

In March 2006, Tri-Rail went from 30 passenger trains a day to 40 trains; the completion of the New River rail bridge, the double-tracking project, and the addition of a second Colorado Railcar diesel multiple unit (DMU) ushered in sweeping changes to Tri-Rail's operational timetables. Tri-Rail added several more trains during peak weekday commuting hours in June 2007, increasing to the current 50 trains per day, as well as increasing weekend service. During "rush-hour," trains ran every twenty to thirty minutes rather than the previous schedule of every hour. This change comes at quite a fortuitous time in Tri-Rail's operation history. With gasoline prices at record highs—particularly in South Florida's sprawling metropolis—Tri-Rail saw a double-digit percentage increase in ridership in mid-2007. By 2009, annual ridership had reached about 4.2 million passengers. This was also the time during which work was being done on I-95 to add the express lanes from the Golden Glades Interchange to the Airport Expressway near Downtown Miami. In 2007, Veolia Transport commenced operating the Tri-Rail service under a contract that ran until June 2017.

=== 2009–2022: Growth and airport station ===
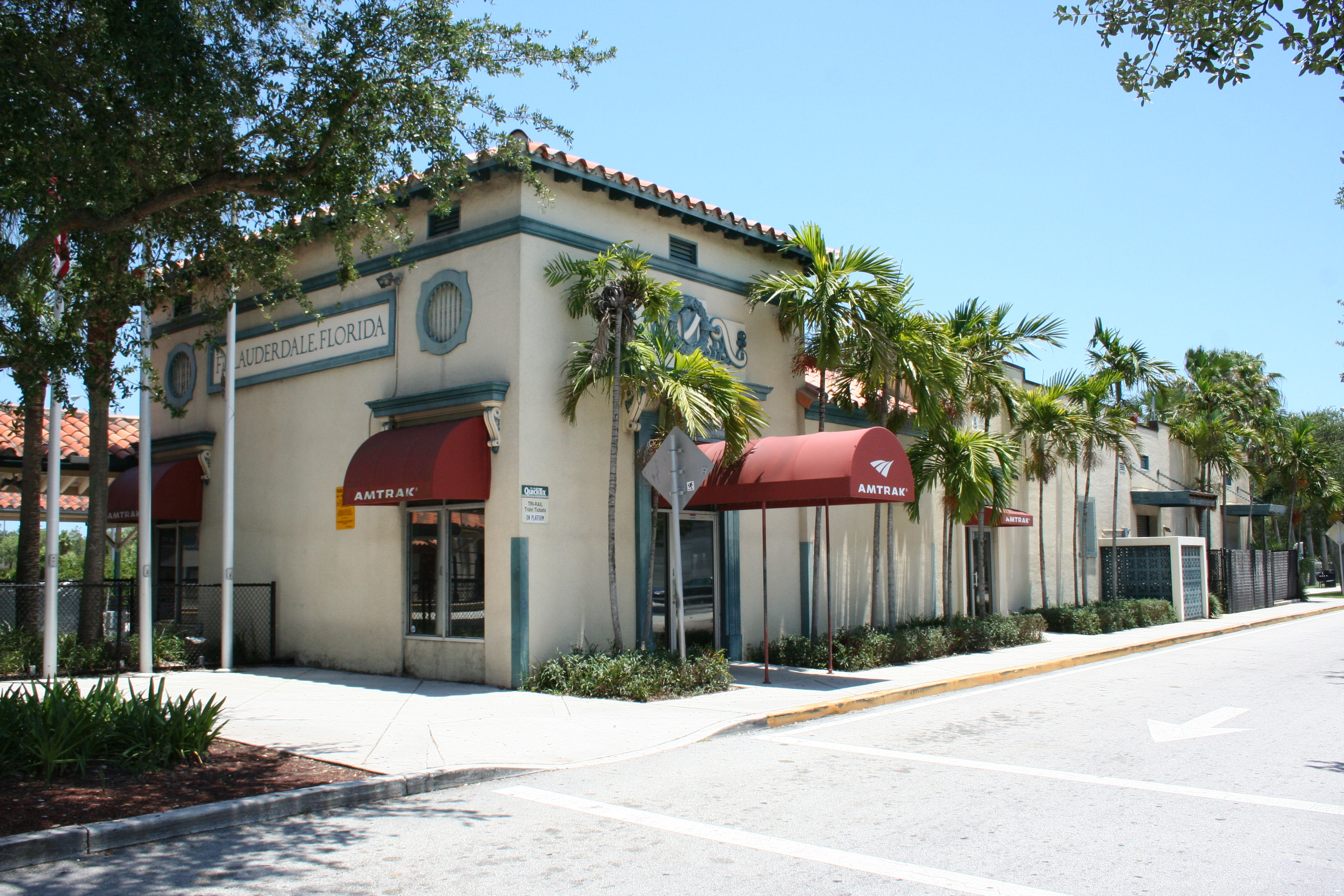
Fort Lauderdale station, built in 1927, serves Tri-Rail and Amtrak.

In 2009, Tri-Rail service was nearly cut drastically, with the threat of being shut down altogether by 2011, even as ridership was at a record high, as Palm Beach County withheld its funding of the system and looked to cut its funding from $4.1 million to $1.6 million per year. This would mean that Broward and Miami-Dade counties would also have had to cut their support to $1.6 million each to match. The state, which was also running a budget shortfall and did not pass a rental car tax increase to help fund Tri-Rail, would have had to cut its support as well. This would have caused an immediate cut from 50 to 30 daily trains and a complete cutting weekend service, followed by additional cuts and possible shut down two years later. Schedules were decreased slightly, but service was never cut altogether, as dedicated federal funding was attained through the $2.5 million grant as part of the American Reinvestment and Recovery Act of 2009.

After a 25% fare increase in mid-2009, annual ridership dropped by 15% (about 600,000) in 2010. However, in 2011, Tri-Rail again saw increasing ridership due to sustained high gas prices, averaging about 14,500 riders per weekday by the end of year. Throughout the year, ridership increased at a rate of about 11% per month, paired with a decline in automobile travel and an increase in employment, with 285 companies and 2,829 individuals joining in the discount program.

In 2011, the dilapidated Pompano Beach station received a $5.7 million federal grant, to be redone as a "green station," generating more than 100% of its energy demand through solar power, with the excess to be sent to the grid or stored for nighttime lighting. Construction started in spring 2012 with the station remaining open during construction. The crossing of Race Track Road and the Tri-Rail line near the Pompano Beach station, rough for several years, was also repaired in 2012.

In early 2012, it was announced that a second Tri-Rail station in Boca Raton was once again being considered at the busy intersection of Glades Road (S.R. 808) and Military Trail (S.R. 809), near Town Center Mall, Florida Atlantic University and large office parks. A station was proposed for this location in the early 2000s while many other stations were being renovated. Boca Raton station near Yamato Road (S.R. 794) is the busiest station in the system as of 2014, with 1,600 riders a day, surpassing the Tri-Rail and Metrorail transfer station in Miami-Dade County. For this reason, and the fact that Glades Road is considered the most congested road in the county, an infill station there has been long considered. However, in 2019, plans for the station were ultimately canceled by the city and Tri-Rail.

Total ridership on the system fully recovered to earlier high levels in fiscal year 2013, to 4.2 million. Tri-Rail wanted to double ridership by 2021 to 30,000 daily riders by building the Coastal Link.

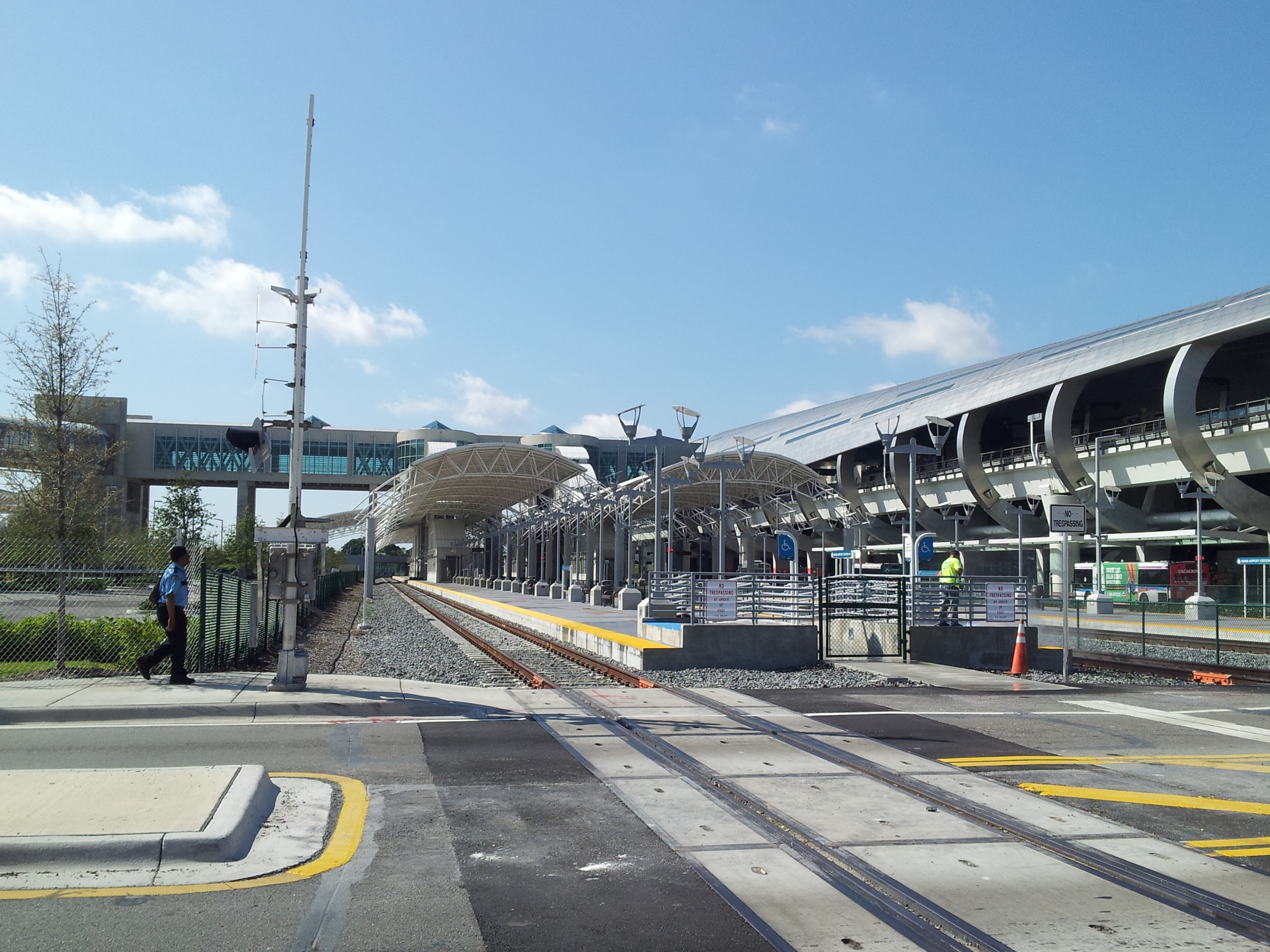
Miami Intermodal Center opened in April 2015. It is the largest station in Florida, serving Tri-Rail, Metrorail, and buses.

In April 2015, the Miami Airport station opened at the Miami Intermodal Center, once again connecting Tri-Rail directly with the Miami International Airport for the first time since the original Miami Airport station closed in 2011. This new station has connections to MIA Mover (providing a direct link to the airport), Metrorail, Metrobus and Greyhound. After extensive delays, Amtrak has yet to move its operations from its current station. This new station was under construction since 2009, with a September 2011 closure of the original Miami Airport station to allow for construction of the new station.

On January 27, 2017, the South Florida Regional Transportation Authority Governing Board voted to award Herzog Transit Services a $511 million, 10-year contract to operate Tri-Rail beginning in July 2017. The board disqualified the other five bidders (Amtrak, Bombardier, First Transit, SNC-Lavalin Rail & Transit and incumbent operator Transdev), stating that they had all submitted "conditional" prices despite the request for proposals mandating that the bid price be final. The other five losing bidders all protested the contract, with Transdev, Bombardier, and First Transit jointly requesting a court injunction to prevent it from being awarded.

=== 2023–present: Livery redesign and MiamiCentral service ===
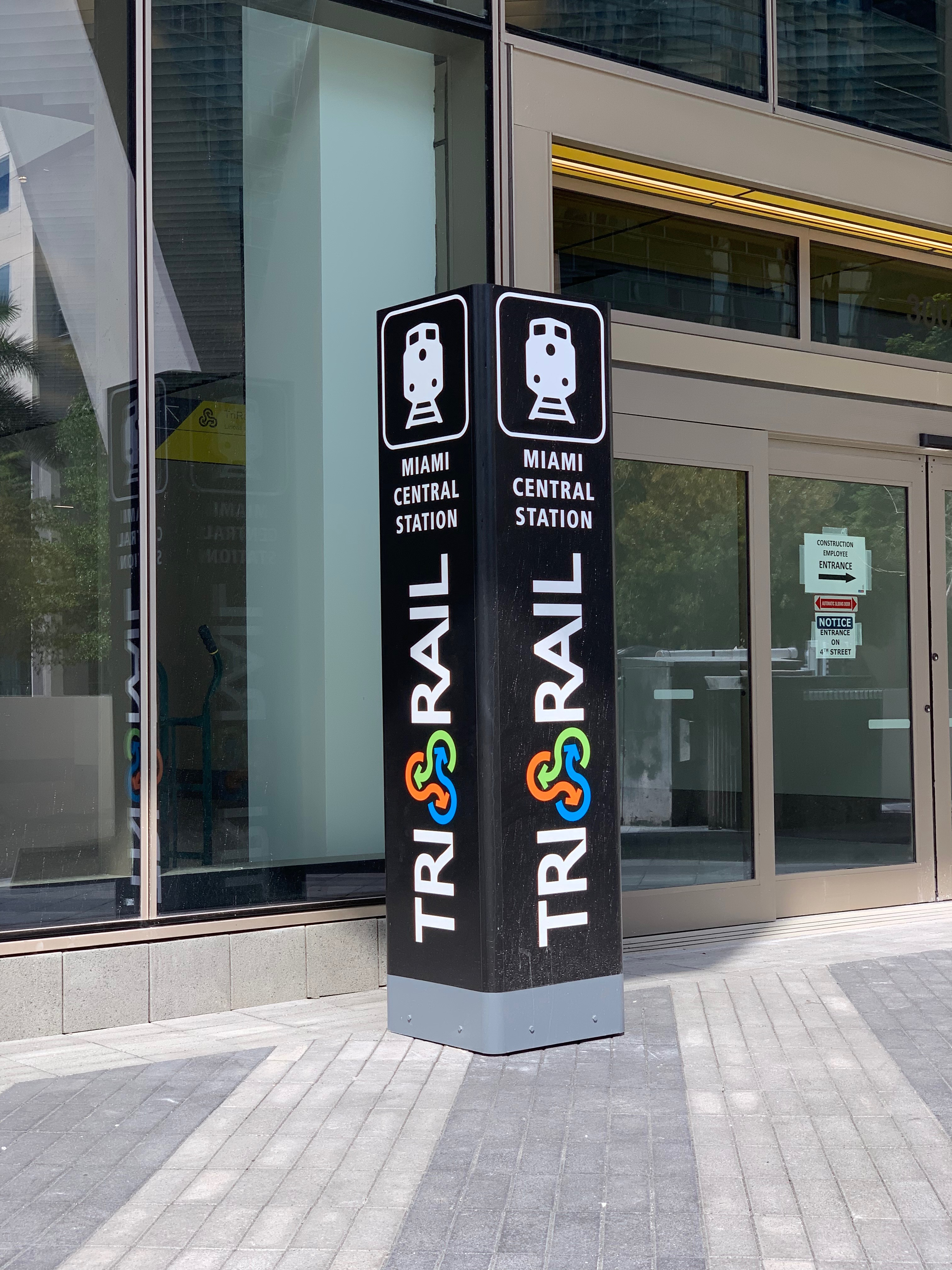
A sign at MiamiCentral displays Tri-Rail. This station includes direct connections to Brightline, Metrorail, and Metromover, as well as being part of a mixed-use complex.

In the first quarter of 2023, the South Florida Regional Transportation Authority (SFRTA) reported a 25% increase in Tri-Rail ridership, surpassing 350,000 riders for the first time in three years. To meet the demand, the SFRTA began an overhaul process with their Brookville locomotives, which was anticipated to be completed by 2025, and received a federal grant that will allow the replacement of a third of the aging fleet of railcars with new ones, which are expected to start service in the coming years. In addition, the SFRTA created a new livery design, which debuted in time for the Tri-Rail service into MiamiCentral.

Tri-Rail service to MiamiCentral (Tri-Rail Downtown Miami Link) began service on January 13, 2024. The station, which is also a mixed-use complex, is located in Downtown Miami and includes direct access to Brightline as well as Miami-Dade Transit services. The initial service consists of a shuttle service between Metrorail Transfer station and MiamiCentral, but a MiamiCentral Express train has since been added, running from MiamiCentral to West Palm Beach station. To continue traveling north or south, a transfer is required. It marks the first time Tri-Rail trains use Florida East Coast's trackage for service. Tri-Rail trains switch to the FEC's Little River Branch on the Iris Connection south of Metrorail Transfer station and head east to the FEC mainline, where they turn south and head to Downtown Miami. Tri-Rail trains began testing the corridor on June 19, 2023. The total cost of accommodating Tri-Rail trains in MiamiCentral was about $70 million.

With the Brightline extension to Orlando, the company has indicated that their trains have reached capacity, especially during peak commute time along the Southeast Florida region. As a result of this, Brightline proposed for the SFRTA to facilitate a Tri-Rail express train between the West Palm Beach station and MiamiCentral, with few stops in between. This would be similar to the route Brightline currently services in Southeast Florida. On May 31, 2024, the SFRTA announced that the new weekday rush-hour express train, with stops at Boca Raton, Fort Lauderdale Airport, and Metrorail Transfer, which began service on July 1, 2024.

== Extensions and upgrades ==
=== Proposed routes ===
==== Coastal Link (FEC line service) ====
In the 2025 and 2030 long-range transportation plans, Tri-Rail has envisioned moving to or adding service on the Florida East Coast Railway (FEC) corridor, which runs parallel to U.S. 1 (Biscayne Boulevard/Brickell Avenue in Miami-Dade County, and Federal Highway in Broward and Palm Beach counties). This corridor will provide more opportunities for pedestrian travel from stations to end destinations than does the current South Florida Rail Corridor, which must rely almost exclusively on shuttle buses for passenger distribution. Tri-Rail officials project that the project would cost about $2.5 billion and that 59,000 people per day would ride it, The FEC, which denied the state's request to use the line for commuter rail in the 1980s, is now under new ownership as of 2017, and has now stated that it is willing to allow the use of the 85-mile-long (137 km) segment of track between downtown Miami and Jupiter for passenger trains.

Tri-Rail service on the FEC line would bring stations to Downtown Miami's transit hub, Government Center station via MiamiCentral, as well as service in Midtown Miami/Miami Design District, Upper East Side/Miami Shores, North Miami, North Miami Beach/Aventura, Downtown Hollywood, and Downtown Fort Lauderdale.

Track connections between the FEC tracks and the South Florida Rail Corridor are also currently under construction. These connections are mainly for freight connectivity between the two lines, but are planned for future Coastal Link use. The Northwood Connection just north of West Palm Beach will provide a new connection as well as rehabilitating an existing connection. The Iris Connection will connect the SFRC to the FEC's Little River Branch near Hialeah. FDOT has built both connections, which were funded by a federal TIGER grant.

The Coastal Link is planned to begin in phases. The first phase is known as Tri-Rail Downtown Miami Link, which began service on January 13, 2024.

A later phase would allow Tri-Rail to begin service to Jupiter by having trains switch to the FEC on the new Northwood connection north of West Palm Beach and head north to Jupiter with additional stops in Palm Beach Gardens, Lake Park and Riviera Beach. No official timeframe has been given for this phase.

Miami-Dade County is also working to find funding for service on the FEC from Downtown Miami as far north as Aventura. Construction of an additional track for commuter service would require the approval of Brightline, which owns trackage rights to operate passenger trains over the corridor.

If the Coastal Link is fully implemented, Tri-Rail would operate in three separate services with a line on the FEC tracks from Jupiter to Downtown Fort Lauderdale, a line on the existing tracks from Mangonia Park to Pompano Beach, and then transition to the FEC tracks and continue to Downtown Miami. Another line would run on the existing tracks from Boca Raton to Miami Airport.

Before full implementation of the Coastal Link service can begin, officials have acknowledged that a new crossing over (or under) the New River in Fort Lauderdale is necessary. The FEC's current low-level drawbridge is unable to handle Tri-Rail service along with Brightline and FEC freight service without negatively affecting vessel traffic on the river since the bridge would need to be lowered quite often. Proposals include a taller bridge or possibly a tunnel under the river.

In 2020, Brightline solicited a proposal to operate a commuter rail service on the FEC, utilizing its exclusive trackage rights for passenger service, under a different system known as the Northeast Corridor Rapid Transit Project. Under these plans the city of Miami would support the service operated by Brightline, without direct involvement of Tri-Rail.

==== Homestead and Doral (CSX Homestead Subdivision line service) ====
There had been proposals in the past by Miami-Dade County and CSX Transportation to use the CSX Homestead Subdivision for Tri-Rail service, with the corridor being purchased by the county or the Florida Department of Transportation. However, one of the problems at the time was that the price of the corridor was exorbitant. Since then, CSX has had new leadership, and the company is now willing to make a deal with Miami-Dade County to potentially have passenger rail service initiated on the corridor. Service could include the Lehigh spur from the Miami Intermodal Center to Doral, as well as the Homestead Subdivision from the Miami Intermodal Center to Homestead. As of 2024, both lines only see sporadic freight service, and the southernmost 12 miles (19 km) of the Homestead Subdivision (south of the Gold Coast Railroad Museum) have been out of service since 2019.

=== Proposed stations ===
==== VA Medical Center station ====
Tri-Rail is currently in the preliminary stages of adding a station near the VA Medical Center northwest of the Mangonia Park station. The tracks northwest of Mangonia Park are currently owned by CSX Transportation, which Tri-Rail would need to have an agreement with to operate at the potential new station. Palm Beach County is expected to cover the costs of the project.

==== Little River station ====
In November 2023, Swerdlow Group responded to a request for proposals from Miami-Dade County for a new affordable housing development in Little River, which also includes a Tri-Rail station. The project is located just east of I-95 and just north of the FEC's Little River Branch, which is part of the current route of the Tri-Rail Downtown Miami Link, which has no stations along the east-west route (with the north-south route eventually having stations as the result of the Northeast Corridor Rapid Transit Project). Swerdlow Group had indicated that they would fund $20 million for the station.

== Operations ==
Tri-Rail shares the South Florida Rail Corridor trackage with Amtrak's Silver Meteor, Floridian, and CSX Transportation's Miami Subdivision. The Florida Department of Transportation purchased the track from CSX in 1989. Under the terms of the agreement, CSX would continue to provide dispatch services and physical plant maintenance for the track and would have exclusive freight trackage rights until certain conditions were met. At midnight on March 29, 2015, CSX handed over dispatching and maintenance to SFRTA (Tri-Rail). While this should have the advantage of giving passenger trains signal priority over freight trains, it was at first wracked with delays.

Tri-Rail participates in the EASY Card regional smartcard-based fare collection system along with Miami-Dade Transit. Purely paper tickets are also available for same-day or weekend use. A paper ticket or an EASY Card with a paper-based transfer receipt (created after a confirmed trip is completed) can be used to obtain transfer discounts when transferring to Broward County Transit as well as Palm Tran. However, only EASY Cards may be used to obtain a transfer discount when transferring to Miami-Dade Transit.

Due to the route's success, Amtrak's Silver Meteor and Floridian do not allow local travel between West Palm Beach and Miami. The two trains only stop to discharge passengers southbound and receive passengers northbound. This policy is in place to make seats on those two trains available for passengers making longer trips.

=== Fares and services ===
Tri-Rail fare is divided into six zones for 24-hour passes, ranging from $2.50 to $8.75, with fare calculated by the number of zones traveled through, and whether it is one-way or round trip. On weekends, a $5 all-day pass good for all zones is available, though trains run hourly headways. For frequent use, Tri-Rail offers a $110 monthly pass (good for Tri-Rail only) and a $155 regional monthly pass (good on Tri-Rail, Metrorail, and Metrobus). Discount fares are available for senior citizens, the disabled, students, and children under 12. Certain businesses allow their employees to register for the Employer Discount Program, which reduces their fares by 25%. Free parking is available at all Tri-Rail stations. On weekdays, 50 train trips are made in all, with 25 in each direction, while on weekends only 30 trips, 15 north and 15 south, are made in all, with 1-hour headways between each train. While Tri-Rail peaks at speeds of 79 miles per hour (127 km/h), it can be extracted from the timetable and the distance of the line that its overall average speed is approximately 38 miles per hour (61 km/h).

On December 19, 2025, Tri-Rail stated that it will be announcing special service and hours for 2026 FIFA World Cup games at Hard Rock Stadium and Inter Miami CF home games at Nu Stadium.. On March 17, 2026, it announced that special train will depart after every weekend evening Inter Miami game, regardless of end time.

=== Revenue and expense ===
For fiscal year 2010, train revenue was approximately $10.3 million. Total operating expenses for fiscal year 2010, including depreciation expense, were approximately $86.9 million. Expenses increased by approximately $14.9 million or 20.7% when compared to fiscal year 2009. 2010 was a low year for ridership after the economy crashed and there were service cuts. By 2015, ridership was about 25% higher. By 2018, fare revenue was budgeted at $13.4 million, whereas operating expense was $119.8 million.

== Stations ==
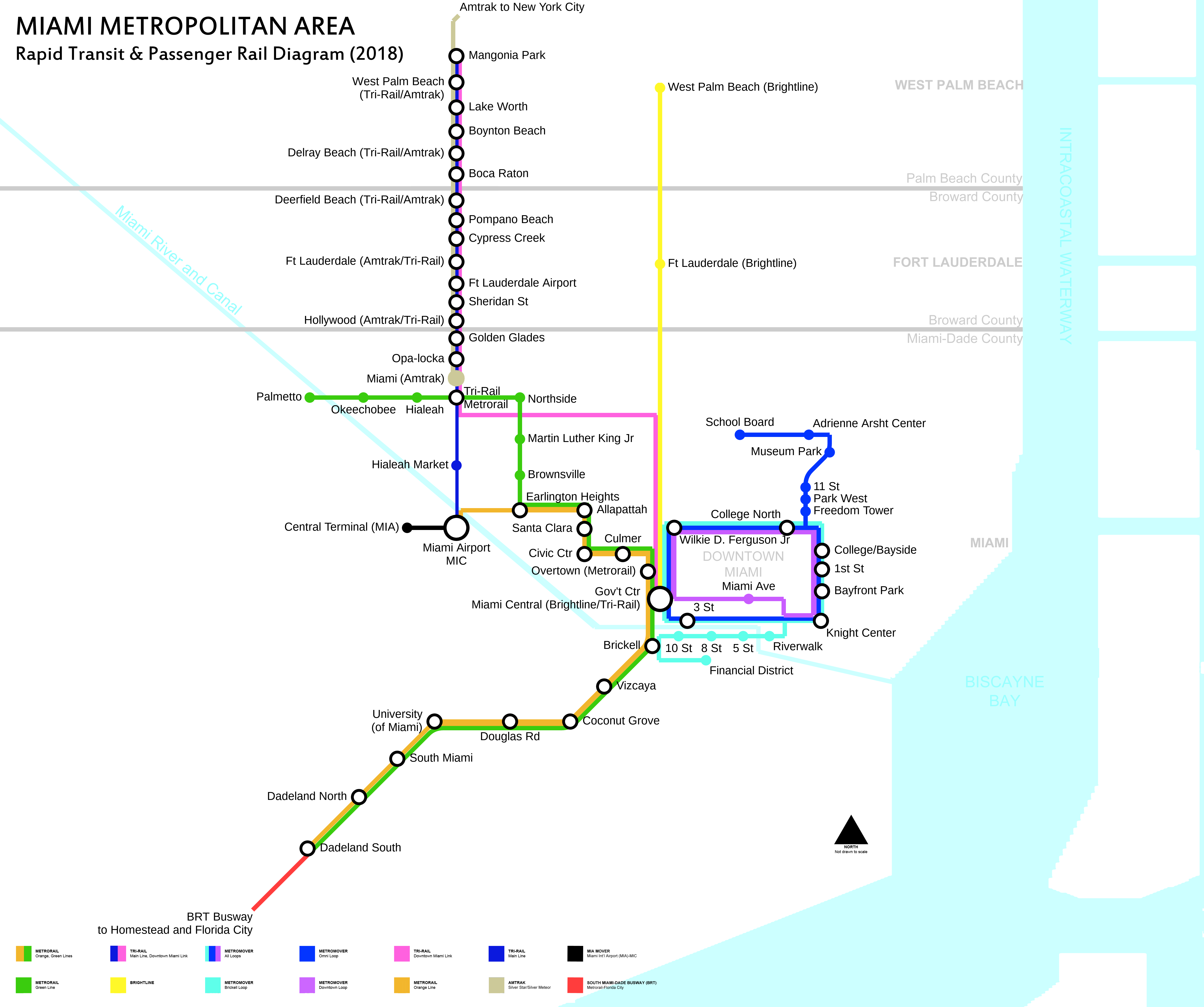
Schematic of rapid transit and passenger rail service in the Miami area in 2018. Tri-Rail's Downtown Miami Link (shown in pink) became operational on January 13, 2024.

A typical station contains two tracks and two side platforms connected by an overpass. Most stations have large parking lots, however, some, like West Palm Beach and Hollywood have a limited number of spaces, most of which are reserved for Amtrak travelers.

Location	Zone	Station	Time to Pompano Beach	Year opened	Connections
Mangonia Park	1	Mangonia Park	48 min	1998	Palm Tran: 31, 33
West Palm Beach	1	West Palm Beach	42 min	1925	Amtrak: Floridian, Silver Meteor; Brightline (at the Brightline station); Palm Tran: 1, 2, 20, 31, 40, 41, 43, 44, 60, 95X; West Palm Move; Greyhound Lines
Lake Worth Beach	1	Lake Worth Beach	33 min	1989	Palm Tran: 61, 62
Boynton Beach	2	Boynton Beach	28 min	1989	Palm Tran: 4, 70, 73
Delray Beach	2	Delray Beach	19 min	1991	Amtrak: Floridian, Silver Meteor; Palm Tran: 2, 70, 81, 88
Boca Raton	3	Boca Raton	13 min	1989	Palm Tran: 2, 94; Boca Raton Shuttles: BocaConnect, TPABS, TREX
Deerfield Beach	3	Deerfield Beach	6 min	1926	Amtrak: Floridian, Silver Meteor; BCT: 48
Pompano Beach	3	Pompano Beach	–	1989	BCT: 34
Fort Lauderdale	4	Cypress Creek	8 min	1989	BCT: 14, 60, 62
Fort Lauderdale	4	Fort Lauderdale	15 min	1927	Amtrak: Floridian, Silver Meteor; BCT: 9, 22, 81; LauderGO!: NW Community Link, Neighborhood Link
Dania Beach	5	Fort Lauderdale Airport	22 min	2000	BCT: 4, 6, 15, 16; Dania Beach Bus: West Route; Tri-Rail Shuttle: FLA-1 to FLL
Hollywood	5	Sheridan Street	26 min	1996	BCT: 12, 110; Greyhound Lines; Megabus
Hollywood	5	Hollywood	30 min	1928	Amtrak: Floridian, Silver Meteor; BCT: 7; Cloud: 3
Miami-Dade	6	Golden Glades	39 min	1989	Metrobus: 75/75A, 77, 401, 95/95A/95B, 401; BCT: 18, 441; NMB Trolley: Route E; Greyhound Lines; FlixBus
Opa-locka	6	Opa-locka	45 min	1927	Metrobus: 32, 135; Tri-Rail Shuttle: North Link
Hialeah	6	Metrorail Transfer	52 min	1989	Metrorail: Green; Metrobus: 79
Hialeah	6	Hialeah Market	58 min	1989	Metrobus: 132
Miami	6	Miami Airport	64 min	2012	Metrorail: Orange; Metrobus: 7, 20, 36, 37, 56, 150, 338; MIA Mover to Miami International Airport; Greyhound Lines; FlixBus
Miami	6	MiamiCentral	72 min (transfer at Metrorail Transfer)	2018	Brightline; Metrorail: Green Orange; Metromover: Omni Brickell Inner; Metrobus: 2, 3, 7, 9, 11, 21, 77, 95, 100, 203, 207, 208, 400, 401, 836, 837; BCT: 109, 110

== Ridership ==
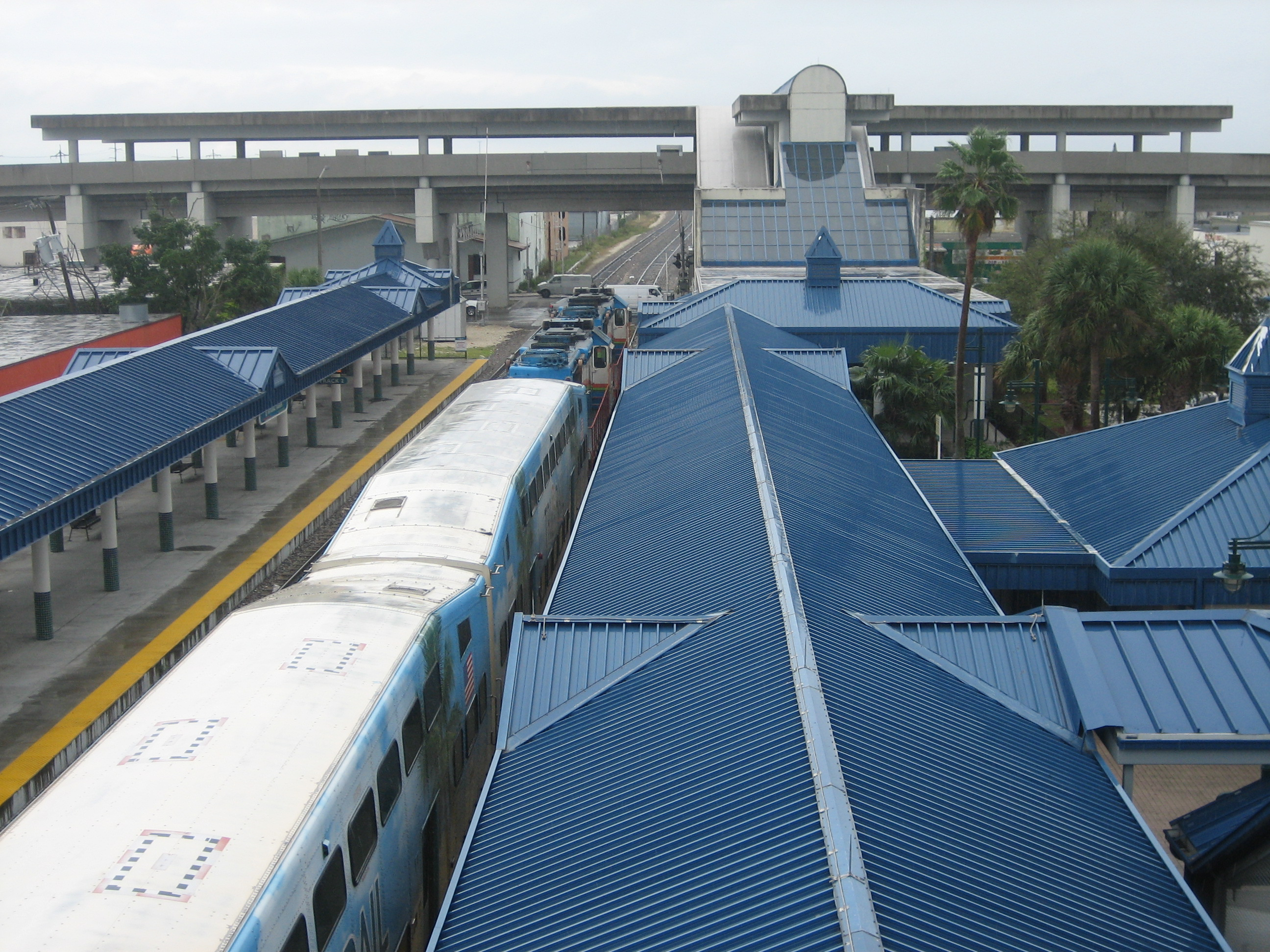
Tri-Rail and Metrorail Transfer Station is one of the busiest stations on the line and serves as a major transfer point between Tri-Rail and Miami-Dade Transit.

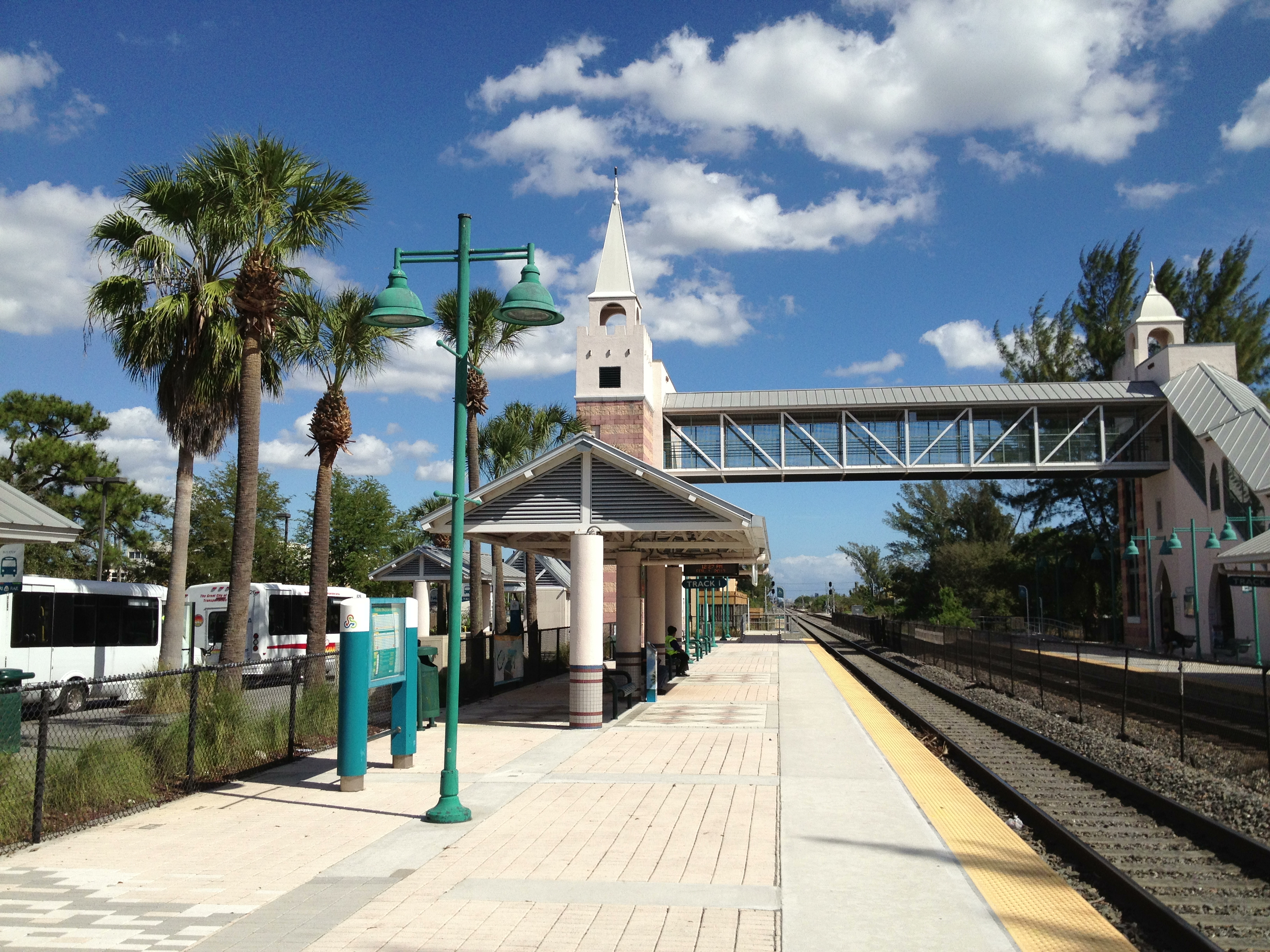
Opa-locka features Moorish Revival architecture similar to historic buildings in Opa-locka.

Annual ridership averages

Date	Passengers Annual total	% Change	Passengers Weekday average
1995	2,481,200	-	N/A
1996	2,301,400	-7.2%	7,500
1997	2,377,700	+3.3%	8,000
1998	2,215,600	-6.8%	7,200
1999	2,180,000	+1.6%	7,300
2000	2,397,900	+10.0%	8,700
2001	2,543,604	+6.1%	8,500
2002	2,629,400	+3.4%	9,200
2003	2,755,300	+4.8%	9,200
2004	2,814,800	+2.2%	9,700
2005	2,619,900	-6.9%	8,500
2006	3,177,000	+21.3%	11,600
2007	3,502,500	+10.2%	12,600
2008	4,303,600	+22.9%	14,800
2009	3,789,700	-11.9%	12,400
2010	3,645,000	-3.8%	12,300
2011	3,947,900	+8.3%	13,300
2012	4,070,700	+3.1%	14,300
2013	4,350,782	+6.9%	14,800
2014	4,389,600	+1.0%	14,400
2015	4,292,705	-1.0%	13,900
2016	4,240,699	-1.0%	13,900
2017	4,287,400	+1.1%	13,900
2018	4,413,900	+2.9%	13,900
2019	4,505,100	+2.0%	13,900
2020	2,204,500	-51.1%	6,400
2021	2,029,609	-8.3%	6,350
2022	2,776,205	+31.1%	9,500
2023	3,735,897	+29.5%	13,000
2024	4,578,680	+22.6%	14,800

=== Ridership records ===
Tri-Rail posted its highest-paid daily ridership in the commuter-rail system's 24-year history on June 24, 2013. It transported 19,060 people, many of whom attended a "victory parade" for the Miami Heat, which won the 2013 National Basketball Association championship. Most trains operated at or near capacity, SFTRA officials said in a press release. Special four-car sets were operated to accommodate the anticipated overflow crowd.

Previous Miami Heat victory parades resulted in high ridership counts for Tri-Rail, as well. On June 23, 2006, Tri-Rail transported 18,613 riders; and on June 25, 2012, the agency carried 18,355 passengers. In 2019, TriRail reached its highest annual ridership with 4.5 million riders. Tri-Rail also saw a faster ridership rebound than other mass transit after the Covid pandemic, reaching 4.9 million annual rides in 2025.

== Rolling stock ==
=== Locomotives ===
Tri-Rail began service using a fleet of five F40PHL-2 locomotives built in 1988. These were remanufactured locomotives, built by Morrison–Knudsen using the frame and other components from retired EMD GP40 units previously owned by Conrail, and the bodies from EMD F45 units previously owned by Burlington Northern. These locomotives had head-end power (HEP) supplied from a generator connected via a shaft to the prime mover. The F40PHL-2 fleet was retired in 2015.

The fleet was later expanded with five F40PH locomotives. Three were F40PH-2C models built new by Morrison–Knudsen in 1992 using new frames, a remanufactured EMD engine, and a standalone engine for head-end power (HEP), which was not part of the original F40PH design. The other two were F40PH models built in 1981 for Amtrak and rebuilt by Boise Locomotive Company, a successor to Morrison–Knudsen, as the F40PHR-2C, to the same standard as the F40PH-2C. The F40PH locomotives were later rebuilt by Progress Rail between 2016 and 2021 and returned to service as -3C models.

In 2006, Tri-Rail acquired six EMD GP49 locomotives from Norfolk Southern, which were remanufactured for passenger service by Mid-America Car Company. The units, reclassified as GP49H-3s, were originally built as GP39X locomotives in 1980 for Southern Railway and upgraded to GP49 specifications by Norfolk Southern in 1982. The rebuild for Tri-Rail included the addition of HEP.

In February 2011, Tri-Rail placed an order for ten Brookville BL36PH locomotives, with options for additional units, at a cost of US$109 million. The procurement was controversial, drawing criticism from state lawmakers and business groups, and prompting a lawsuit from rival bidder MotivePower, the successor to Morrison–Knudsen and Boise Locomotive. Two additional BL36PH locomotives were later added to the order, bringing the total to twelve. Delivery was completed by 2015.

In January 2025, Tri-Rail announced an order for seven Siemens Charger locomotives. According to the agency, the Charger was the only locomotive offered that met its operational and regulatory requirements, including compatibility with service into MiamiCentral station. The new locomotives are intended to enable expanded service into Miami and replace the aging GP49PH-3 locomotives.

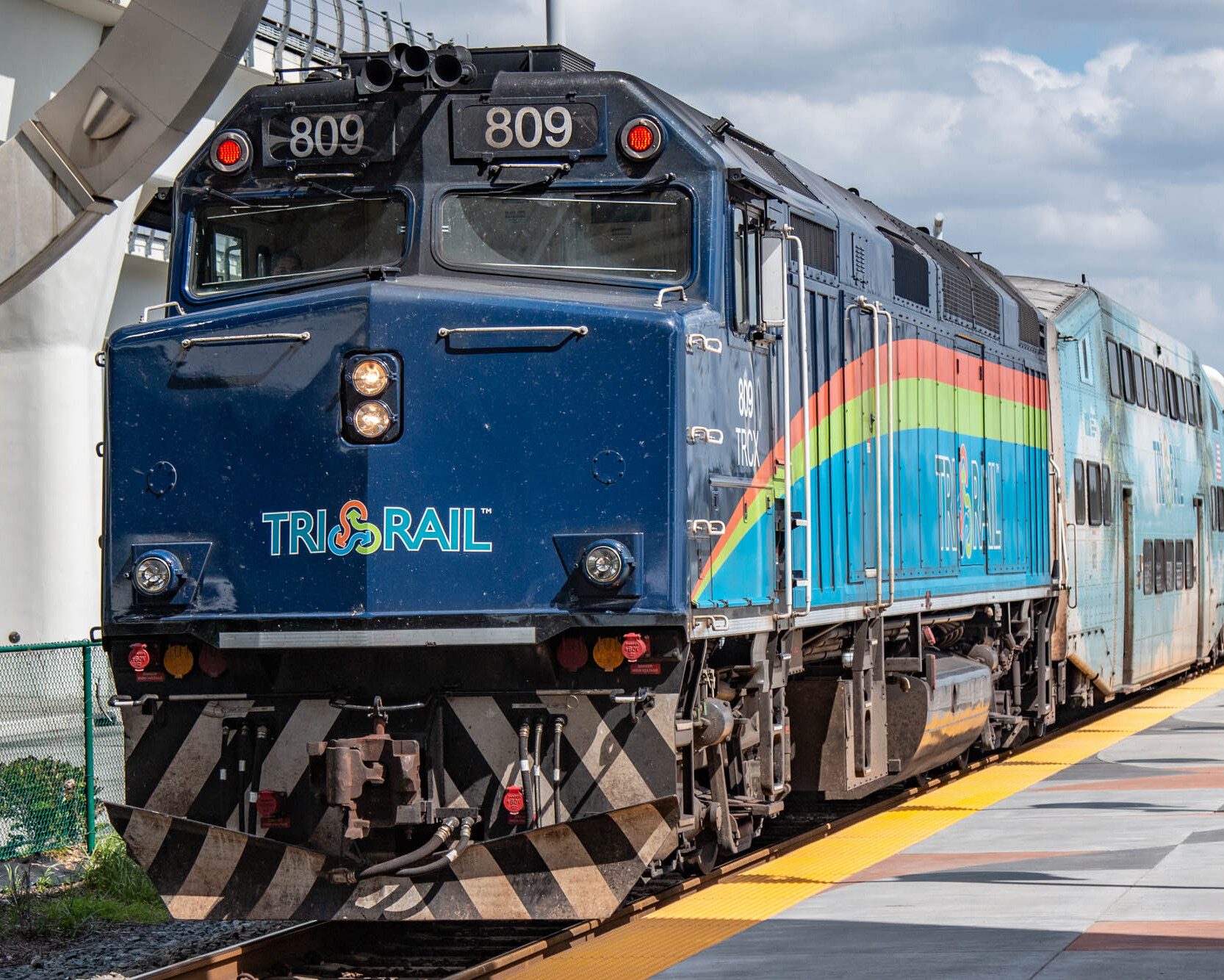
F40PH

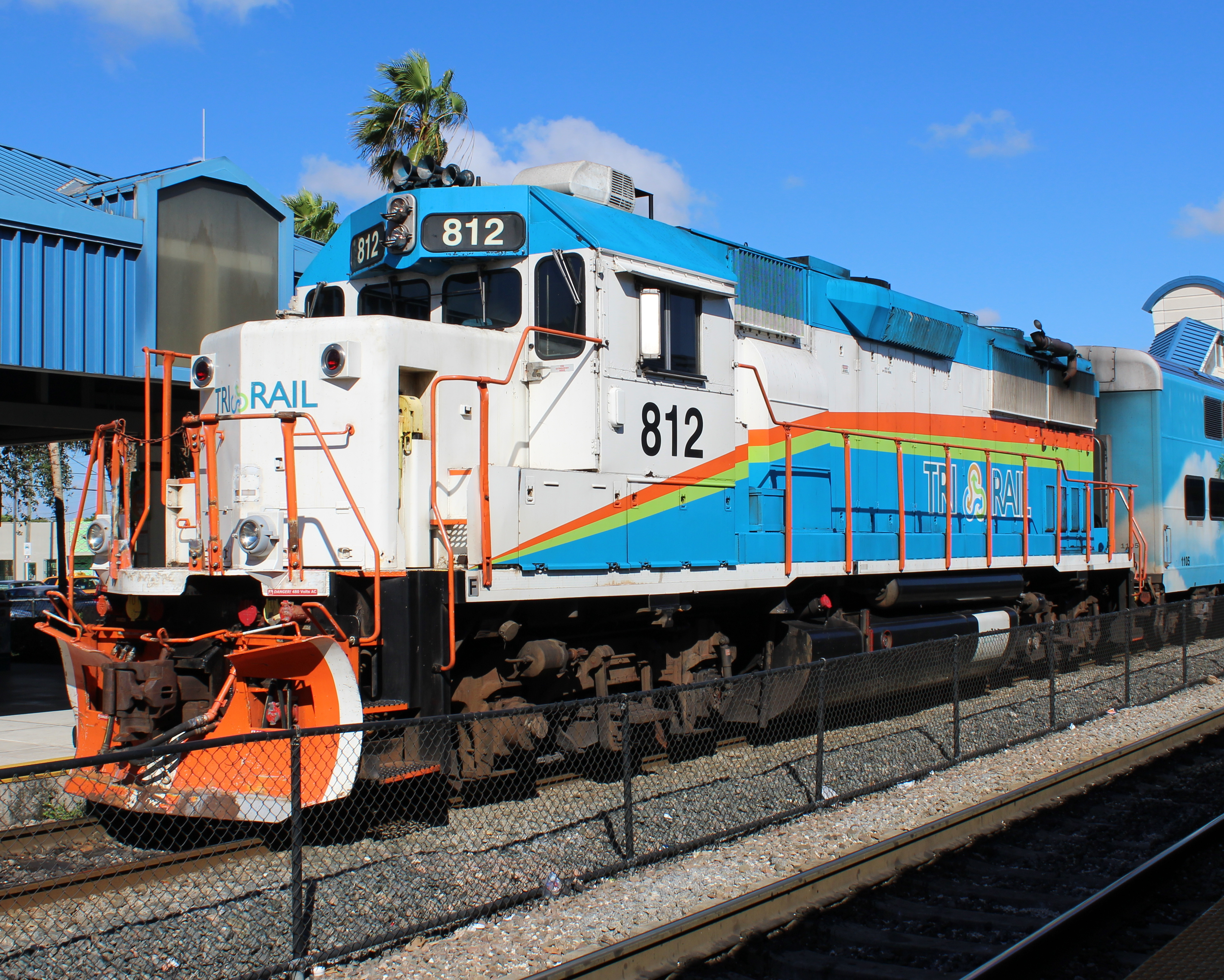
GP49

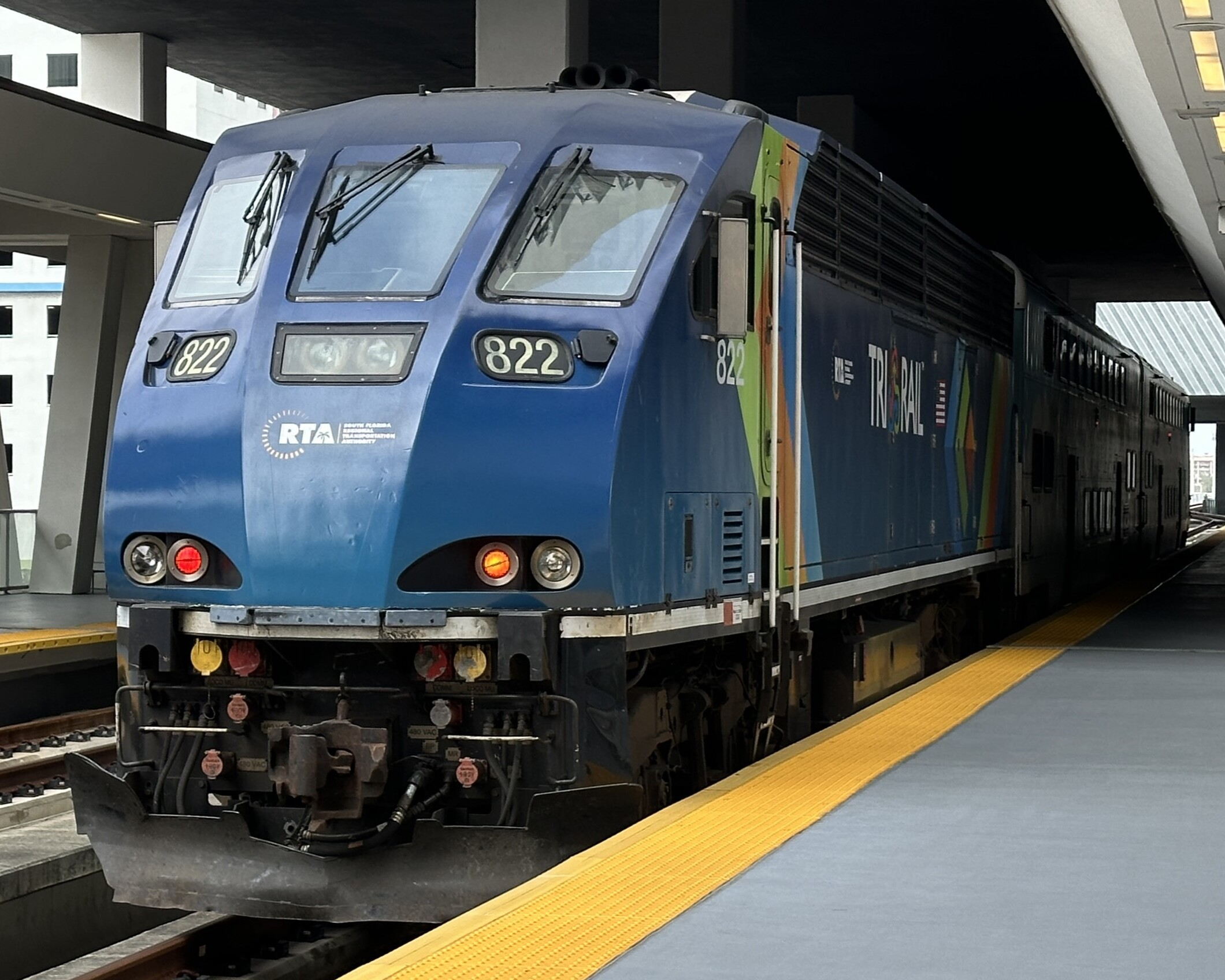
BL36PH

=== Passenger cars ===
Since the start of operations, Tri-Rail has primarily used BiLevel Coach passenger cars. The original fleet consisted of cars built by the Urban Transportation Development Corporation (UTDC), including six cab-equipped cars and fifteen trailer coaches. These cars were built to specifications similar to those used by GO Transit and were delivered in the same paint scheme. The fleet was later supplemented in 1996 with five additional cab cars built by Bombardier, UTDC's successor, which were added to a larger order originally placed by Metrolink of Southern California. Beginning in 2015, some of the UTDC bi-level coaches were modified to increase bicycle capacity by removing seating on the lower level and installing bicycle racks, allowing each modified car to carry up to 14 bicycles.

In 2010, the South Florida Regional Transportation Authority approved the purchase of ten cab cars and fourteen trailer coaches from Hyundai Rotem for approximately US$95 million. Deliveries occurred between 2011 and 2013, allowing Tri-Rail to restore three-car trainsets that had been temporarily reduced due to equipment shortages. The Hyundai Rotem cars feature enhanced crashworthiness, including front and rear crumple zones.

On December 12, 2024, the South Florida Regional Transportation Authority Governing Board approved an assignment agreement between Metra and Alstom "assigning to SFRTA the right to exercise options to purchase up to 42 coach cars and 20 cab cars."

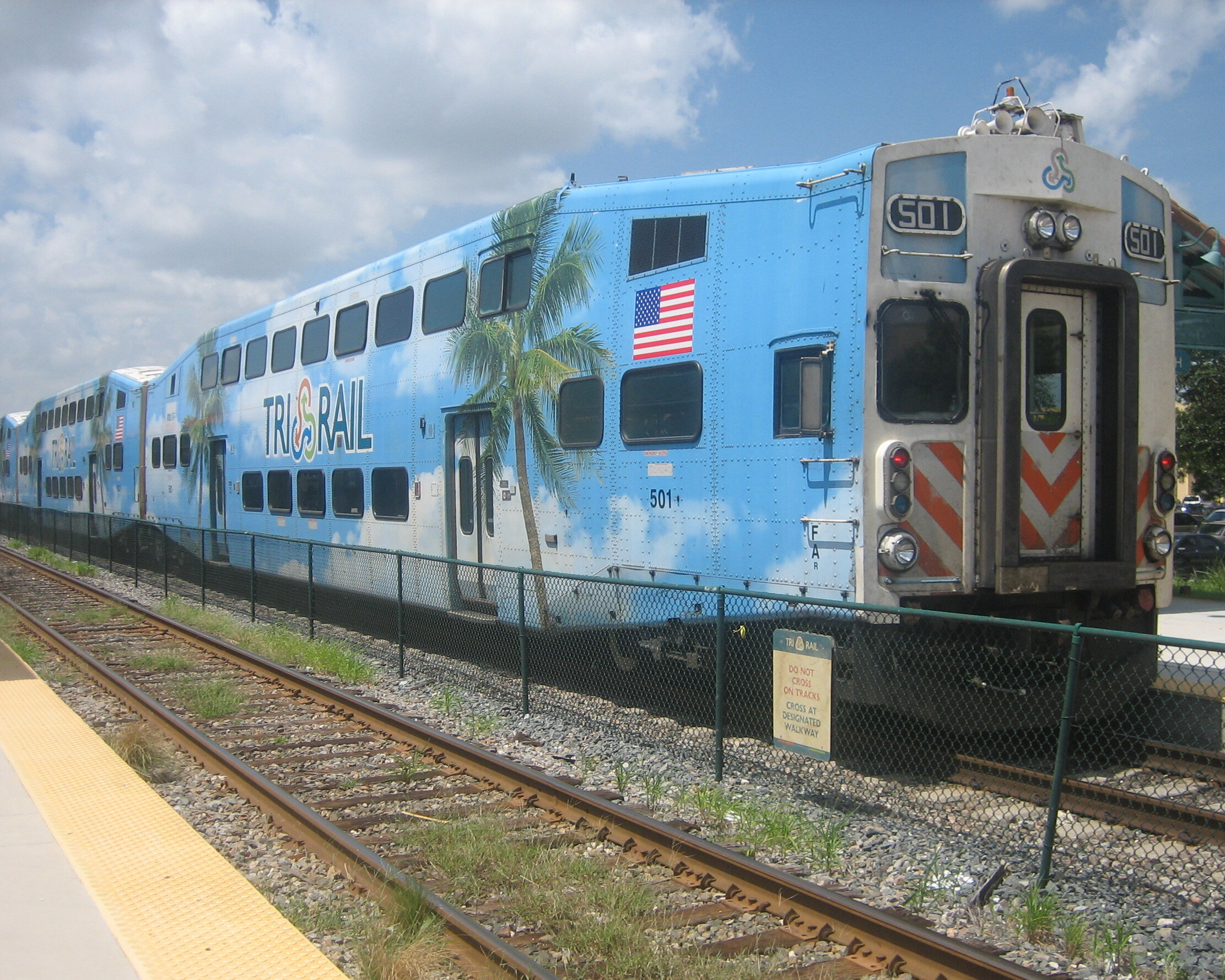
UTDC/Bombardier trainset

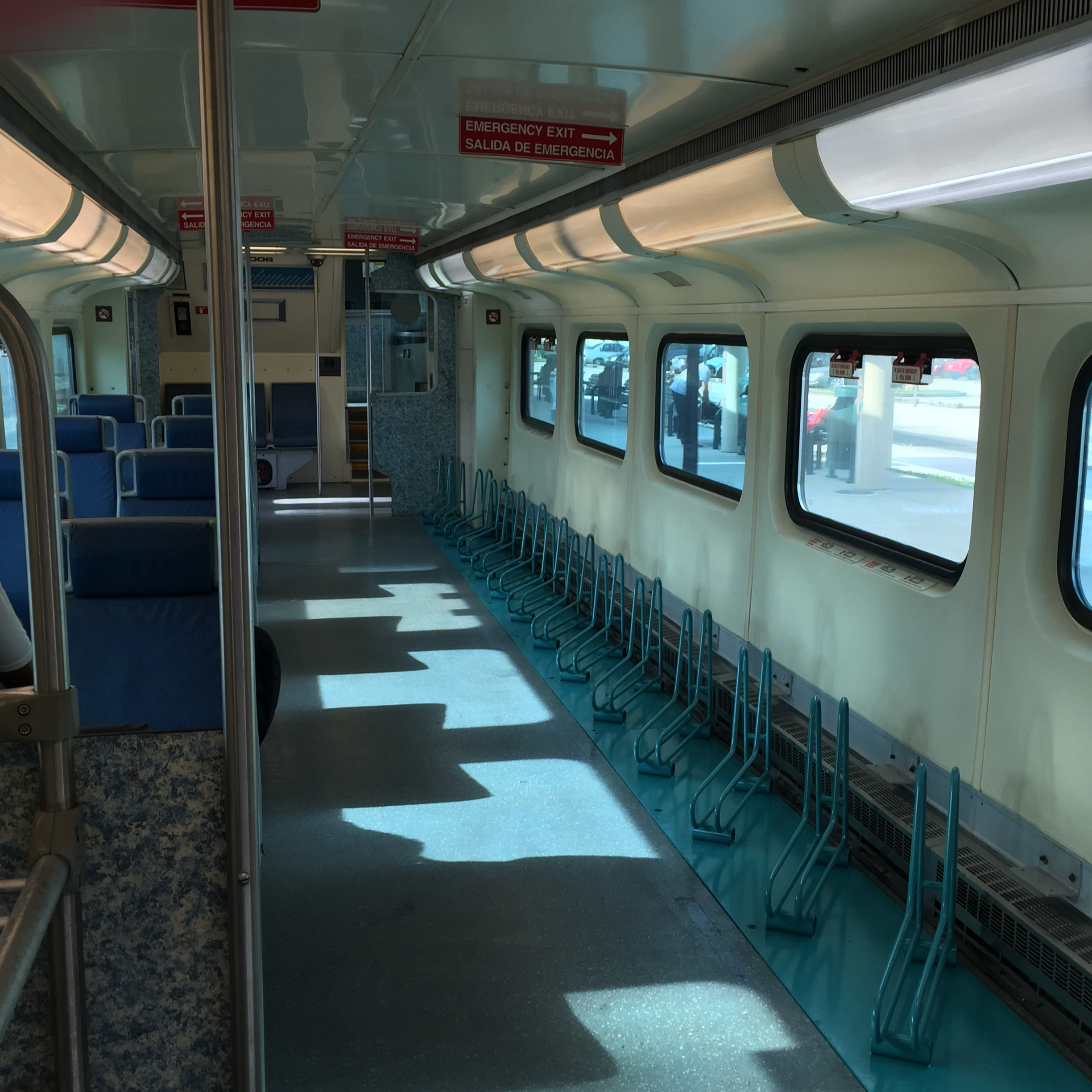
Bicycle car interior

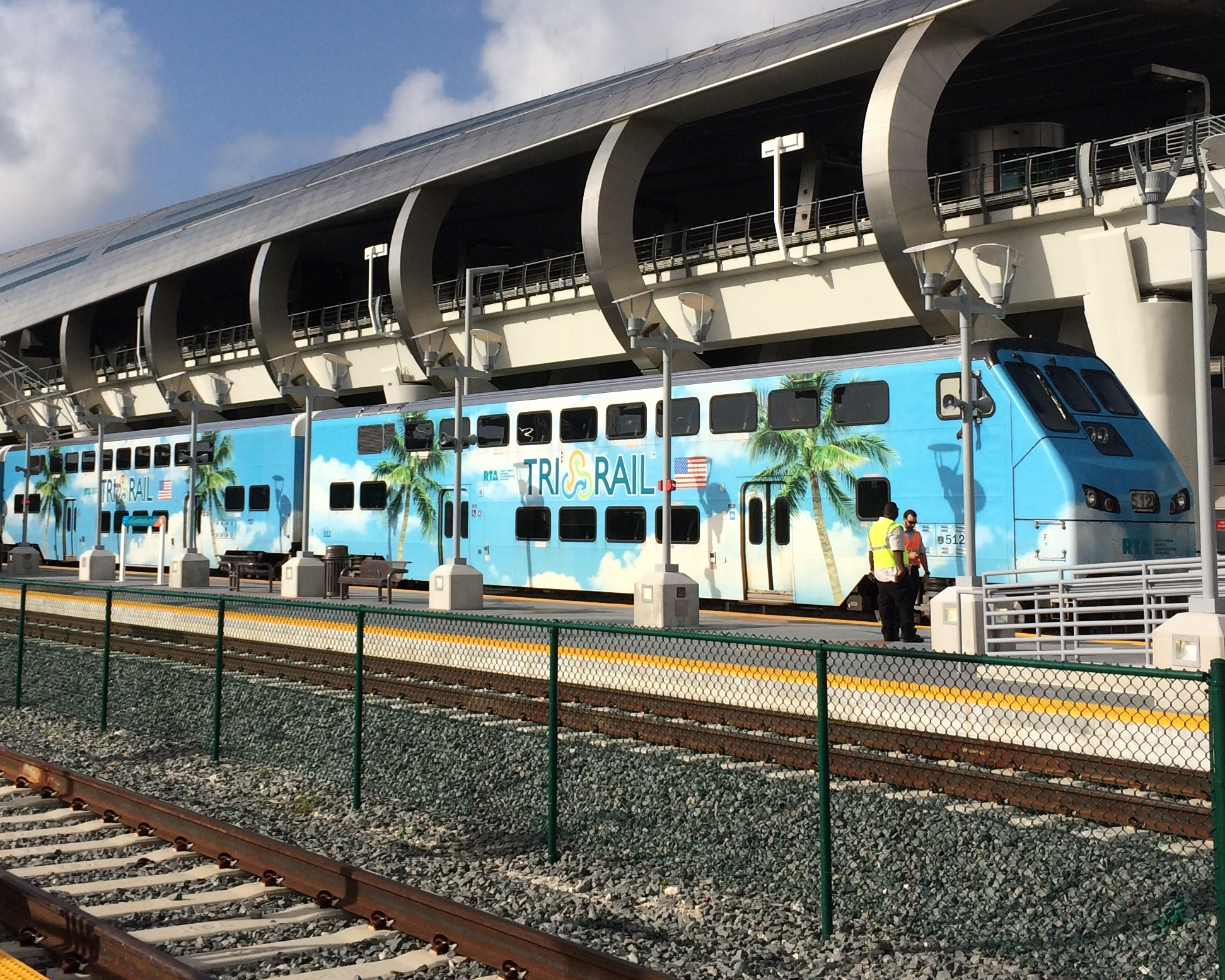
Hyundai Rotem trainset

=== Diesel multiple units ===
Between 2006 and 2012, Tri-Rail briefly operated Colorado Railcar diesel multiple unit (DMU) equipment acquired through a grant from the Florida Department of Transportation. The fleet included four bi-level DMU power cars and two unpowered trailer coaches. The DMUs experienced persistent mechanical reliability issues and were withdrawn from service in 2012.

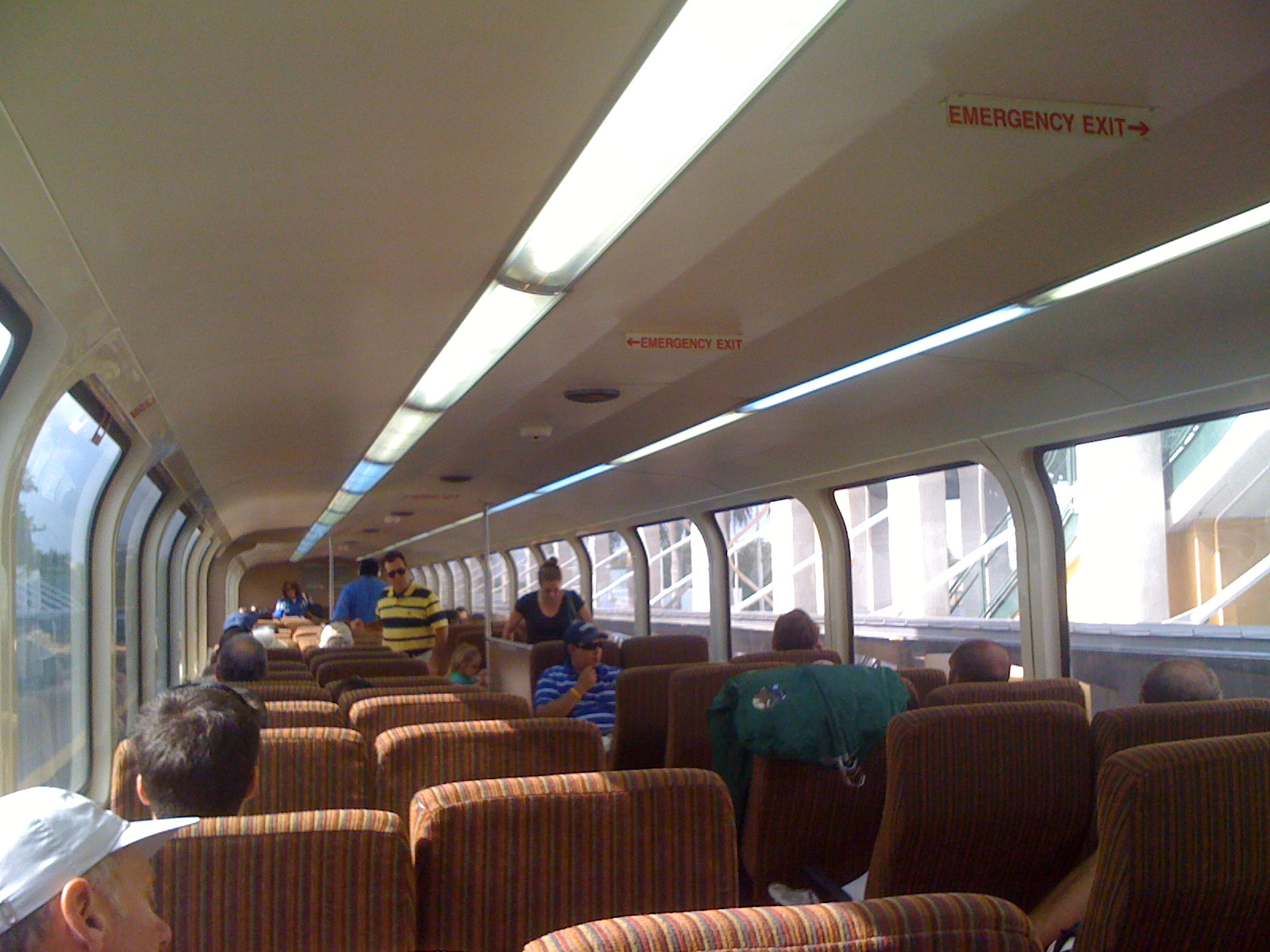
Colorado Railcar interior

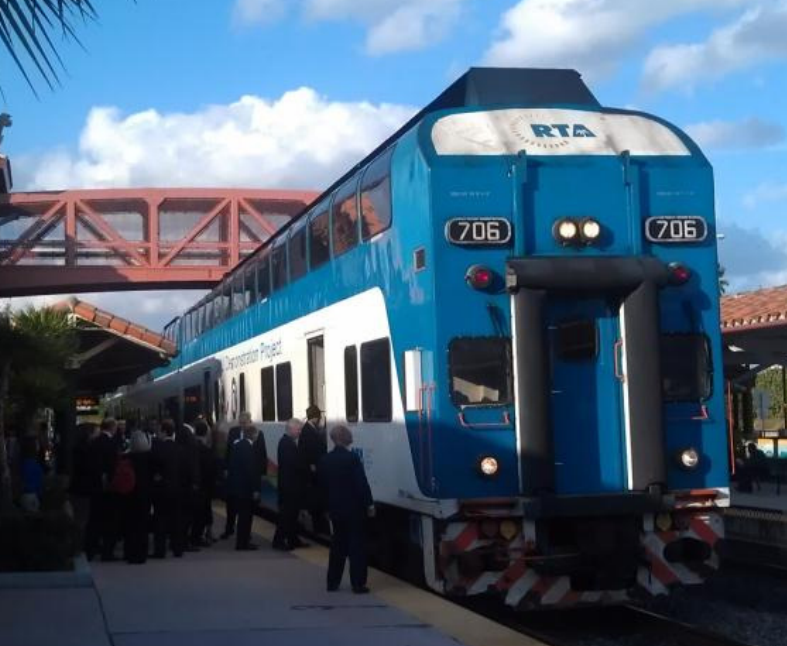
Colorado Railcar DMU 706

=== Chart ===
==== Current fleet ====
Built	Make and model	Road Nos.	In service	Capacity	Notes
Locomotives
1992	MK F40PHM-3C	807–809	3	—N/a	Refurbished 2016–2021.
1981	EMD F40PHR-3C	810–811	2	—N/a	Ex-Amtrak units acquired in 1997 and rebuilt. Refurbished 2016–2021.
1980	EMD GP49H-3	812, 815, 816	3	—N/a	Ex-NS GP49s acquired in 2006, rebuilt and reclassified GP49H-3.
2013–15	Brookville BL36PH	818–829	12	—N/a	
Passenger cars
1987–90	UTDC BiLevel Coach	1001–1015	15	142, 128 (bicycle cars)	Most now bicycle cars, except 1009 and 1015.
1987	UTDC BiLevel Cab Car	501–506	6	136	
1996	Bombardier BiLevel Cab Car	507–511	3	136	509 and 510 damaged and stored
2010–13	Hyundai Rotem Cab Car	512–521	10	140	
2010–13	Hyundai Rotem Coach	1101–1114	14	146	

==== Former fleet ====
Built	Make and model	Road Nos.	Qty.	Capacity	Notes
1968	MK F40PHL-2	801–805	5	—N/a	Rebuilt from Ex-CR GP40 and Ex-BN F45 units in 1988. Sold in 2015.
1980	EMD GP49H-3	813, 814, 817	3	—N/a	Ex-NS GP49s acquired in 2006, rebuilt and reclassified GP49H-3.
2002	Colorado Railcar Single-Level DMU	702	1	73	All were retired by 2012 due to reliability issues.
2005–09	Colorado Railcar Bi-Level DMU	703–706	4	165	All were retired by 2012 due to reliability issues.
2005–07	Colorado Railcar Bi-Level Trailer Coach	7001, 7002	2	182	All were retired by 2012 due to reliability issues.

== Accidents and incidents ==
On January 4, 2016, a passenger train collided with a garbage truck which had broken down on a grade crossing at Lake Worth Beach station and derailed. Twenty-two people were injured. This marked the first derailment in almost 27 years of operation.

On January 28, 2016, Tri-Rail suffered their second derailment in Pompano Beach, after a train hit debris on the tracks between the Cypress Creek and Pompano Beach stations. This section of track is also where Tri-Rail is allowed to go its fastest speed, 79 MPH. One injury was reported and GP49H-3 locomotive #813 and a Bombardier BiLevel Coach directly behind it came off the rail.

On October 25, 2019, a northbound Tri-Rail train led by Bombardier cabcar #509 hit a semitruck in Oakland Park. Several people were injured, and cabcar 509 was sidelined after the incident.

On August 19, 2020 at Deerfield Beach, GP49H-3 locomotive 816 caught on fire and its passengers from the train were safely evacuated. No injuries were reported.

On August 27, 2022, a northbound Tri-Rail train hit a vehicle left on the tracks in Fort Lauderdale. 6 people were taken to the hospital with minor injuries. The train partially derailed as a result of the impact.

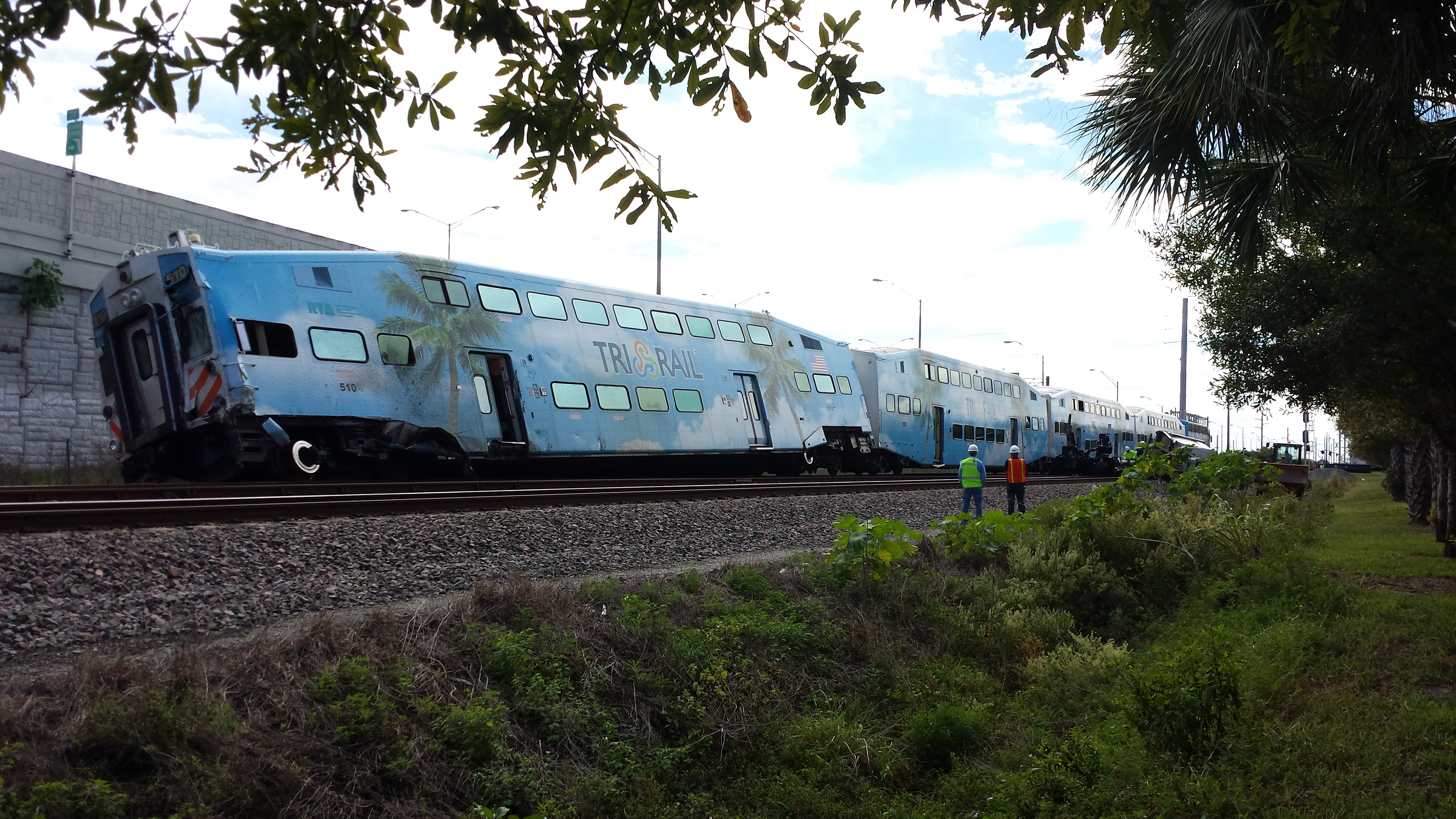
Derailed Tri-Rail cars in Lake Worth Beach on January 4, 2016

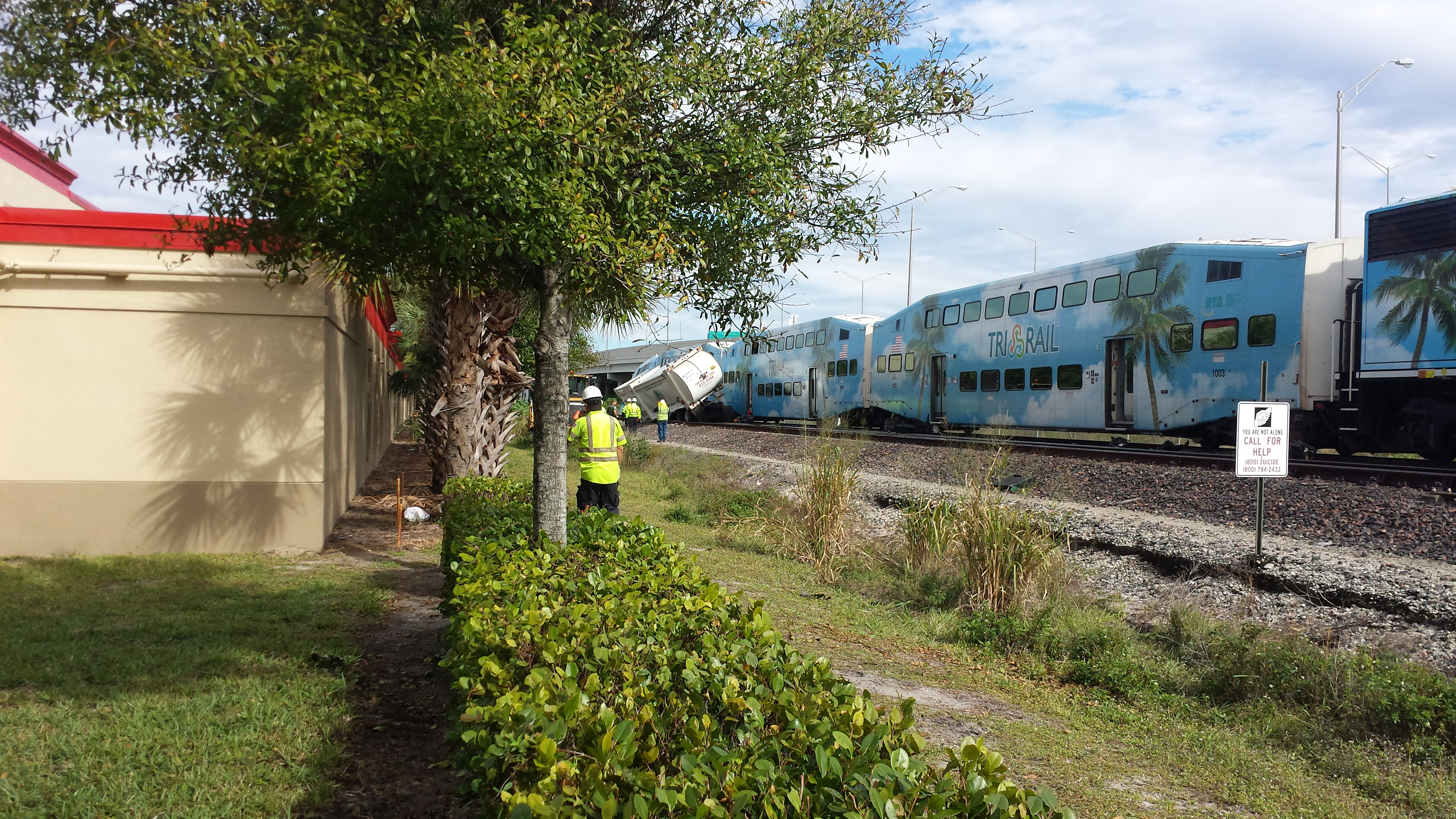
View of the train and garbage truck it struck in Lake Worth Beach

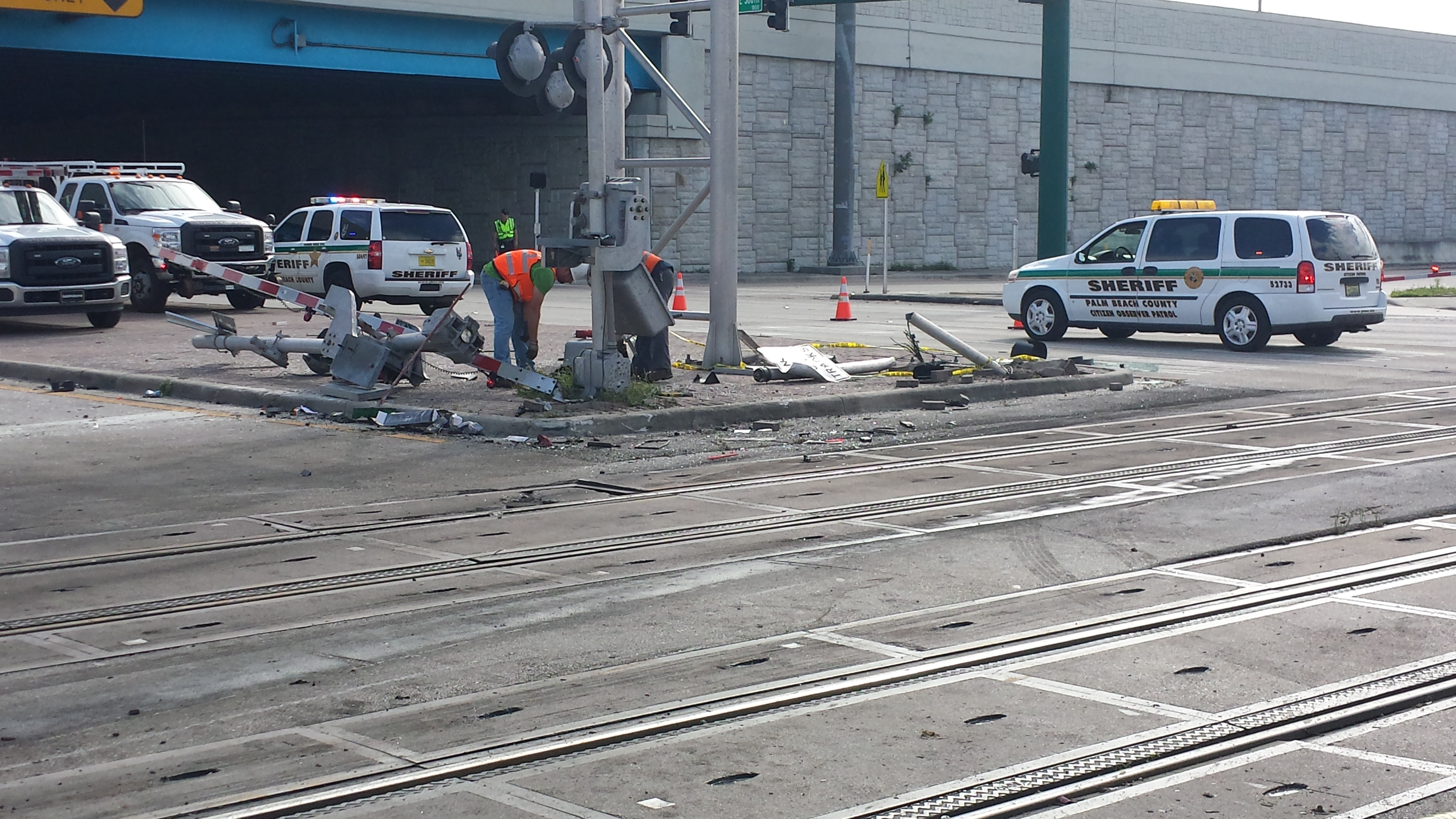
Wrecked crossing signals at the site of the Lake Worth Beach accident

== See also ==
- Metrorail (Miami-Dade County)
- Metromover
- SunRail
- Transportation in South Florida
- List of Florida railroads
- List of United States commuter rail systems by ridership
- Commuter rail in North America
