= Brookville BL36PH =

Passenger locomotive class

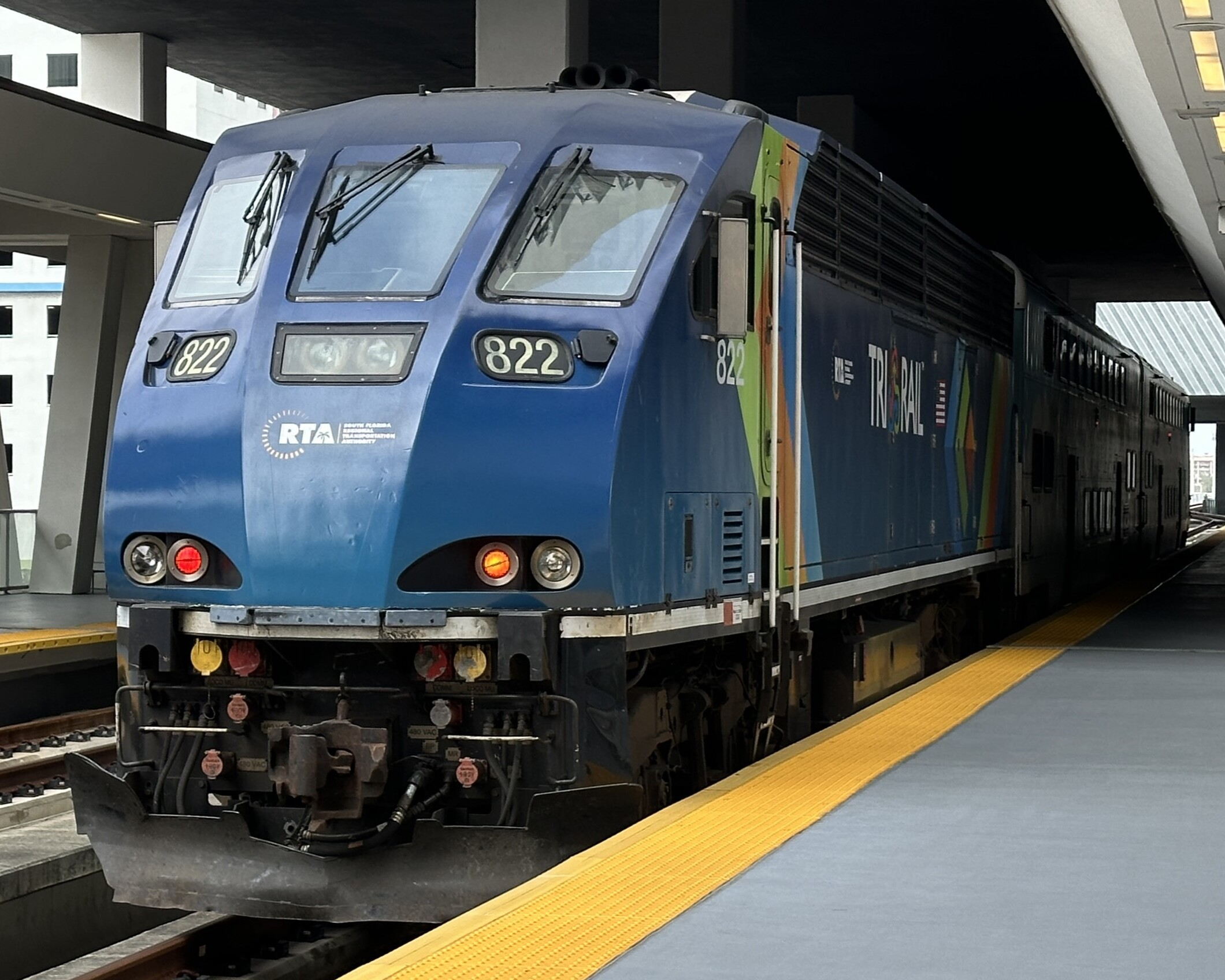
- A BL36PH in service for Tri-Rail
Type and origin
- Power type: Diesel-electric
- Builder: Brookville Equipment
- Model: BL36PH
- Build date: 2012
- Total produced: 12
Specifications
- Configuration
  - AAR: B-B
  - UIC: Bo'Bo'
- Gauge: 4 ft 8 1/2 in (1,435 mm)
- Wheel diameter: 40 in (1,016 mm)
- Length: 67 ft 3.5 in (20.511 m)
- Width: 10 ft 0 in (3.05 m) Over Carbody; 10 ft 7 in (3.23 m) Over Handrails
- Height: 14 ft 8 in (4.47 m) Over Carbody; 15 ft 6 in (4.72 m) Overall
- Loco weight: 289,000 lb (131,000 kg)
- Fuel type: Diesel
- Fuel capacity: 2,300 US gal (8,700 L; 1,900 imp gal)
- Prime mover: MTU 20V 4000 R43
- Engine type: V20 diesel
- Aspiration: Turbocharged
- Displacement: 95.4 liters (5,820 cu in)
- Alternator: Kato 8P6.5-3400
- Traction motors: EMD D-87 BTR
- Cylinders: 20
- Loco brake: Pneumatic and Dynamic
Performance figures
- Maximum speed: 82 mph (132 km/h)
- Power output: 3,620 hp (2.70 MW)
- Tractive effort: 72,000 lbf (320 kN) (starting); 64,800 lbf (288 kN) (continuous) at 14 mph (23 km/h)

The Brookville BL36PH is a four-axle diesel-electric locomotive built by Brookville Equipment for commuter rail service. It has an MTU 20V4000 V20 engine rated at 3,619 horsepower (2,699 kW) and meets EPA Tier 3 emissions standards. It was the first North American passenger locomotive to feature a 20-cylinder engine since EMD's SDP45 and FP45 models from the 1960s. Head end power is generated by a separate, smaller Caterpillar C-18 diesel generator rated at 670 horsepower (500 kW). The BL36PH's shell was designed by noted North American passenger locomotive designer Cesar Vergara.

South Florida's Tri-Rail is the BL36PH's only customer, placing an initial order for 10 in 2011 and adding two more later for a total of 12.

As of 2023, the BL36PH is still advertised on Brookville's website where it has been rebranded as the "Eagle", even though no orders have been placed for it since Tri-Rail's in 2011, and its Tier 3 design is no longer legal for sale in the United States.

== See also ==
- EMD F125
- MPI MPXpress
- Siemens Charger
