= Sheridan Street station =

Railway station in Hollywood, Florida

Sheridan Street

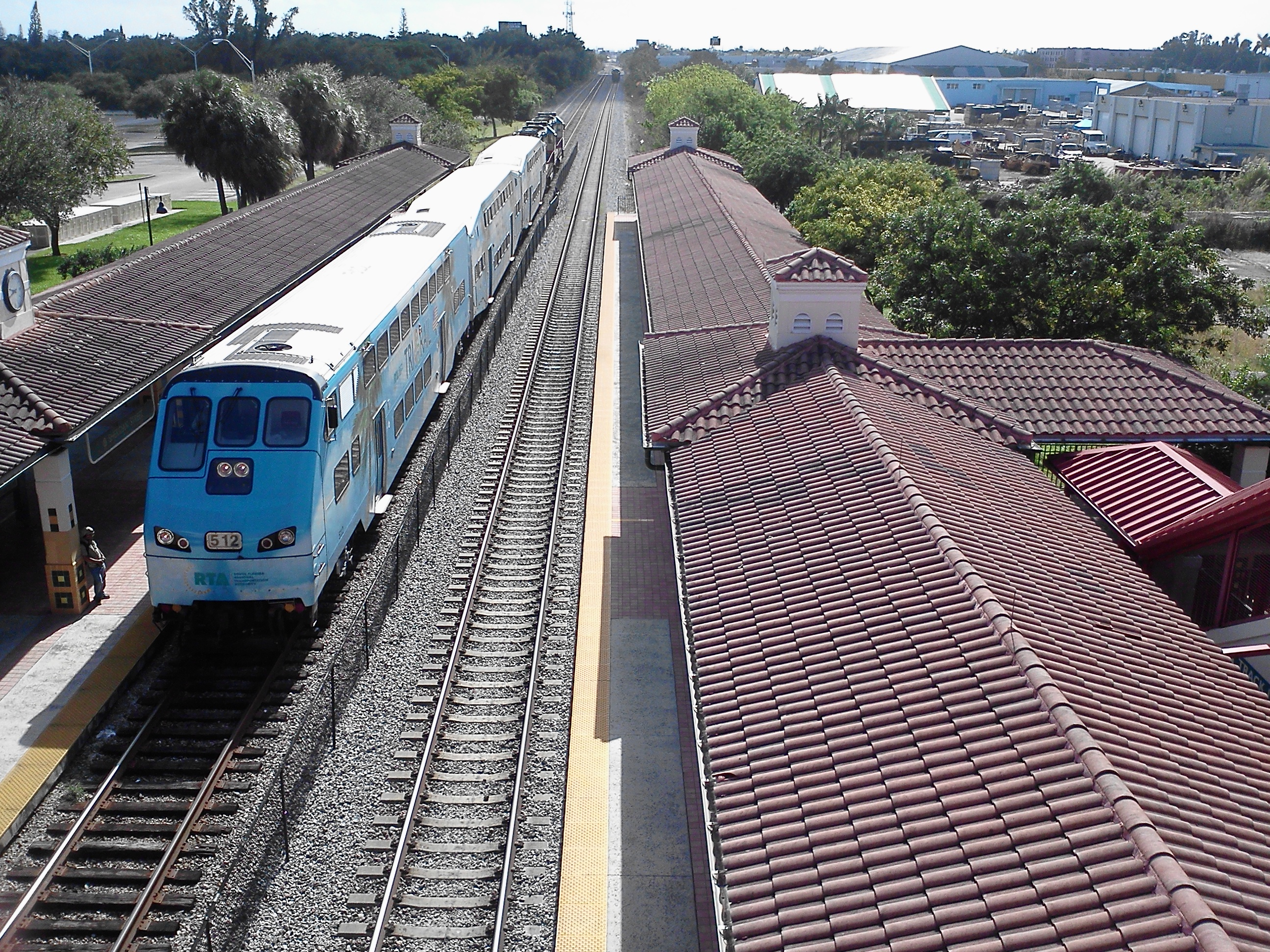
- Sheridan Street station in 2011

General information
- Location: 2900 Sheridan Street; Hollywood, Florida
- Coordinates: 26.032215°N 80.168123°W
- Line: South Florida Rail Corridor
- Platforms: 2 side platforms
- Tracks: 2
- Connections: Greyhound; Broward County Transit: 12; Metrobus: 95

Construction
- Parking: Yes
- Accessible: Yes

Other information
- Fare zone: Fort Lauderdale Airport–Hollywood

History
- Opened: March 15, 1996

Services
Preceding station	Tri-Rail	Following station
Hollywood toward Miami Airport	Main Line	Fort Lauderdale Airport toward Mangonia Park
Express does not stop here
Location

Sheridan Street station is a Tri-Rail commuter rail station in Hollywood, Florida. The station is located near the intersection of Sheridan Street (SR 822) and North 29th Avenue, just west of Interstate 95 at exit 21. It station has two side platforms, with parking and buses east of the northbound platform and a footbridge accessing the southbound platform.

Sheridan Street opened as an infill station on March 15, 1996, at a cost of $1 million.
