= Tri-Rail and Metrorail Transfer station =

Miami-Dade Transit metro station

Metrorail Transfer ● Tri-Rail

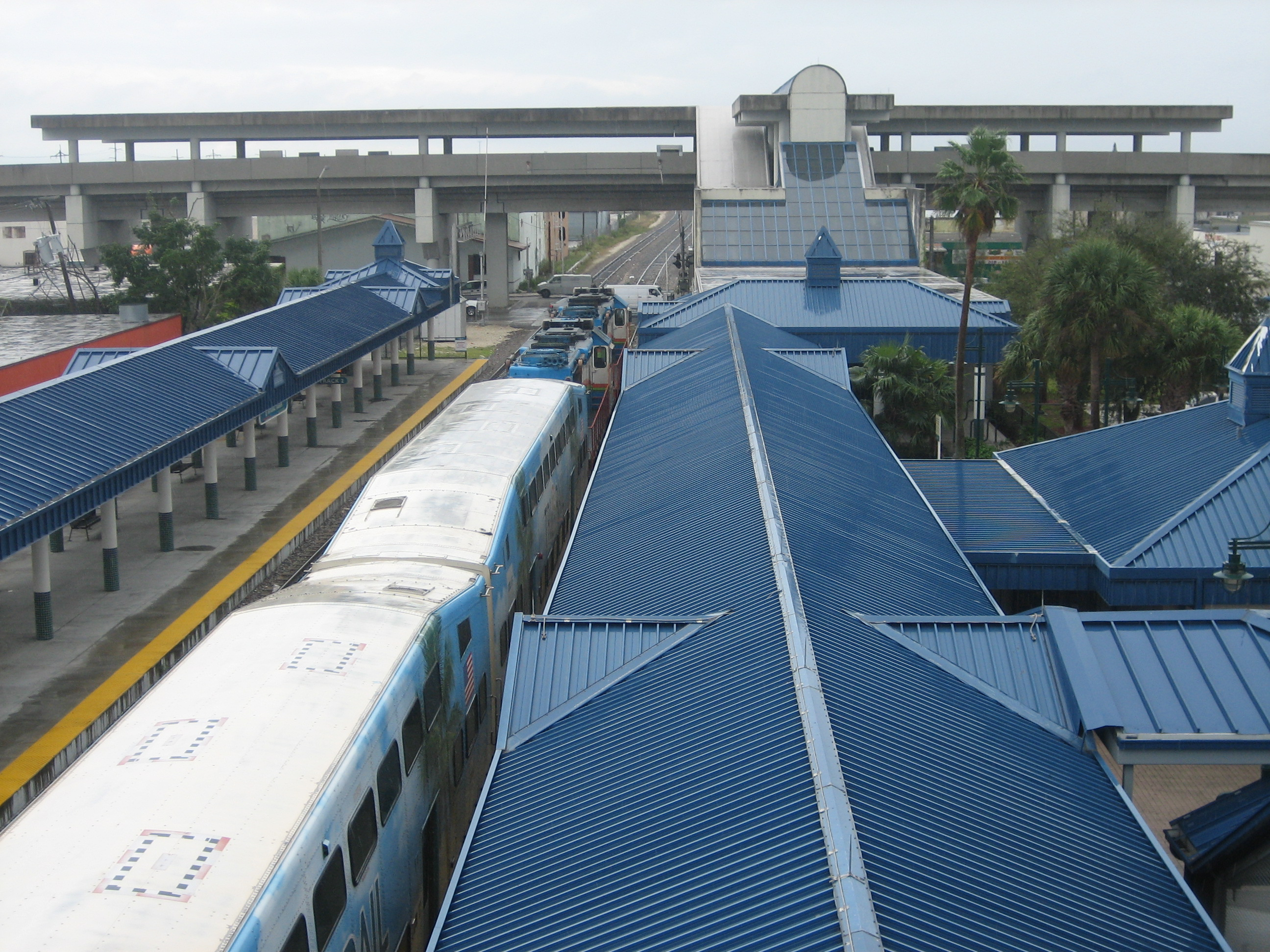
- View of entire station, with the Tri-Rail station foreground and the Metrorail line elevated in background

General information
- Location: 1125 East 25th Street (Metrorail); 2567 East 11th Avenue (Tri-Rail); Hialeah, Florida
- Coordinates: 25°50′43″N 80°15′34″W
- Platforms: 4 side platforms (2 on each level)
- Tracks: 4 (2 on each level)
- Connections: Metrobus: 79

Construction
- Platform levels: 2
- Parking: Park and ride
- Accessible: Yes

Other information
- Station code: TRI (Metrorail)
- Fare zone: Miami–Golden Glades (Tri-Rail)

History
- Opened: March 6, 1989

Passengers
- Oct. 2023: 28,164 ▲11.7% (Metrorail)

Services
Preceding station	Tri-Rail	Following station
Hialeah Market toward Miami Airport	Main Line	Opa-locka toward Mangonia Park
MiamiCentral Terminus	Express	Fort Lauderdale Airport toward West Palm Beach
MiamiCentral Terminus	Shuttle	Terminus
Preceding station	Miami-Dade Transit	Following station
Northside toward Dadeland South	Green Line	Hialeah toward Palmetto
Location

Tri-Rail and Metrorail Transfer station is a Metrorail and Tri-Rail interchange station in Hialeah, Florida, northwest of the city of Miami proper.

This station is located near the intersection of East 25th Street and East 11th Avenue in Hialeah, Florida, officially opening for service on March 6, 1989. The station was built as a connection for the Tri-Rail and Metrorail rail systems; though the Amtrak station, which is served by the Floridian and Silver Meteor, is located only a few blocks away, it is not officially connected to this station. The Amtrak station was scheduled to be moved to the Miami Intermodal Center by late 2018, but was delayed by several years due to a platform length issue. A third Tri-Rail/Metrorail transfer station began service on January 13, 2024, at MiamiCentral, which provides direct access into Downtown Miami along with additional transfer options such as Brightline and Metromover.

== Station layout ==
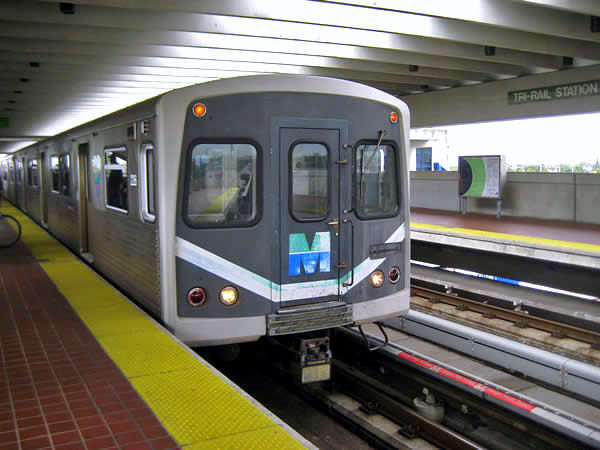
Metrorail arriving on the upper level of the station.

The elevated Metrorail station is directly connected to the southbound Tri-Rail platform at the south end of the complex. Access between Tri-Rail platforms is available via an elevated overpass over the tracks at the north end of the complex.
