= Boca Raton station (Tri-Rail) =

Rail station in Boca Raton, Florida

Boca Raton

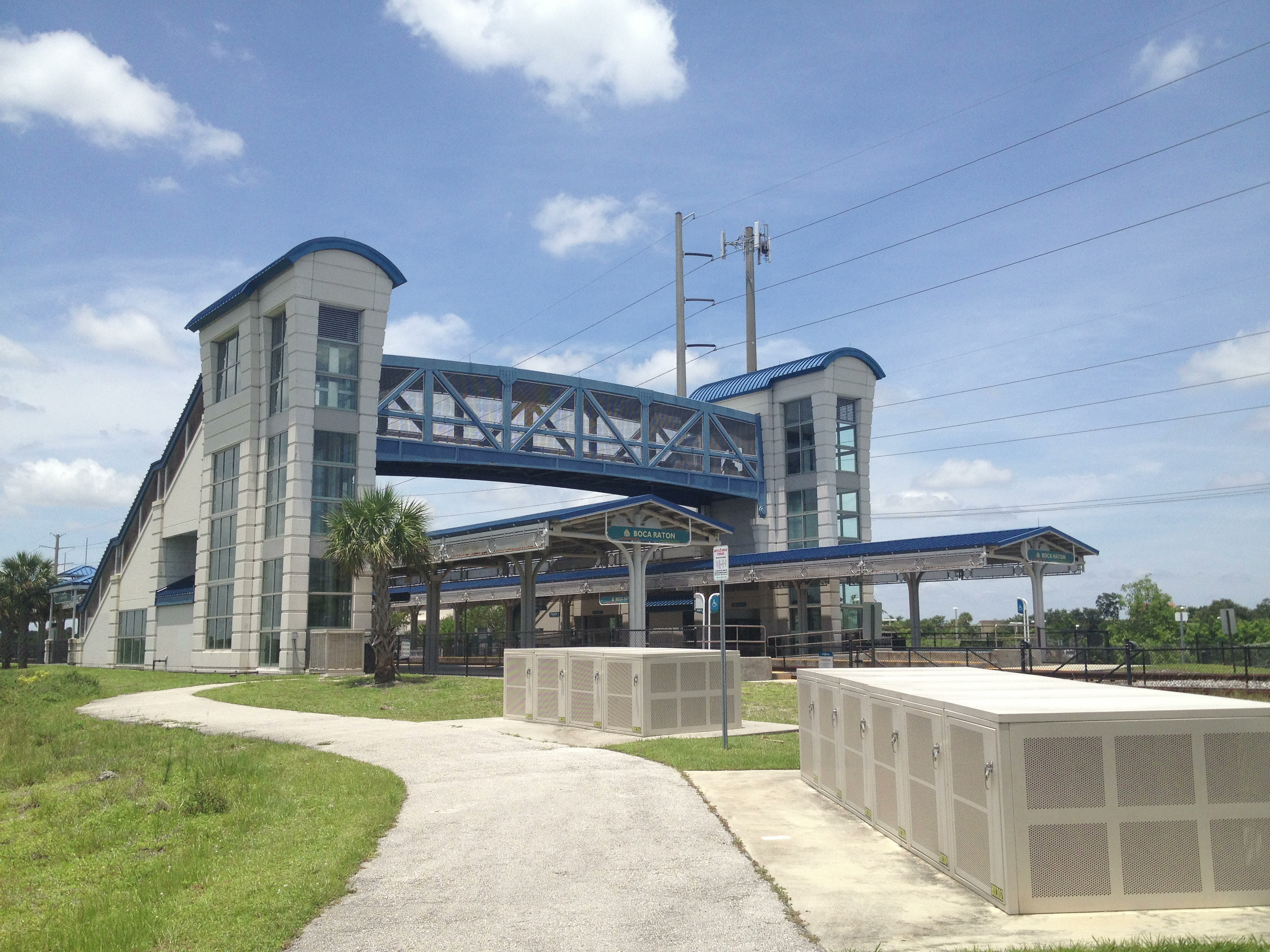
- Boca Raton station in 2013

General information
- Location: 680 Yamato Road; Boca Raton, Florida
- Coordinates: 26°23′33″N 80°05′57″W
- Line: South Florida Rail Corridor
- Platforms: 2 side platforms
- Tracks: 2
- Connections: Palm Tran: 2, 94

Construction
- Parking: Yes
- Accessible: Yes

Other information
- Fare zone: Boca Raton–Pompano Beach

History
- Opened: January 9, 1989
- Rebuilt: November 4, 2005

Services
Preceding station	Tri-Rail	Following station
Deerfield Beach toward Miami Airport	Main Line	Delray Beach toward Mangonia Park
Fort Lauderdale Airport toward MiamiCentral	Express	West Palm Beach Terminus
Future services
Preceding station	Tri-Rail	Following station
Deerfield Beach toward Downtown Miami	Red Line (proposed)	Delray Beach toward Mangonia Park
Location

Boca Raton station is a Tri-Rail commuter rail station in Boca Raton, Florida. The station is located at Yamato Road (SR 794), just east of Congress Avenue (SR 807) and west of Interstate 95. The station has two side platforms, with a parking lot and bus loop west of the southbound platform. An overpass provides access to the northbound platform and the El Rio Trail, which provides direct pedestrian access to Yamato Road.

== History ==
Tri-Rail commuter service began on January 9, 1989, with Boca Raton as one of the intermediate stops. It was located at NW 53rd Street, slightly north of Yamato Road.

In the mid-1990s, the South Florida Regional Transportation Authority began a project to double track the Tri-Rail corridor. The agency awarded a $231 million contract for the Palm Beach County segment in August 2001. Several stations were modified in 2003–2005 with a second platform and a footbridge. Those at Boca Raton, Delray Beach, Boynton Beach, Lake Worth, Mangonia Park, and West Palm Beach were all built to the same design. The rebuilt Boca Raton station was located south of Yamato Road, about 0.4 miles (0.6 km) from the previous station. The South Florida Regional Transportation Authority purchased the 6.68-acre (2.70 ha) site for $2.7 million in August 2003. It was planned to open on October 22, 2005, but ultimately opened on November 4 after a 13-day suspension of Tri-Rail service due to Hurricane Wilma.

By 2014, Boca Raton was the busiest station in the system with 1,600 daily riders. A second Boca Raton Tri-Rail station at Glades Road (SR 808) was proposed in the 2010s, but it was cancelled in 2019 when plans for an adjacent development fell through.

== See also ==
- Boca Raton station (Brightline)
