= Delray Beach station =

Train station in Delray Beach, Florida, US

Delray Beach

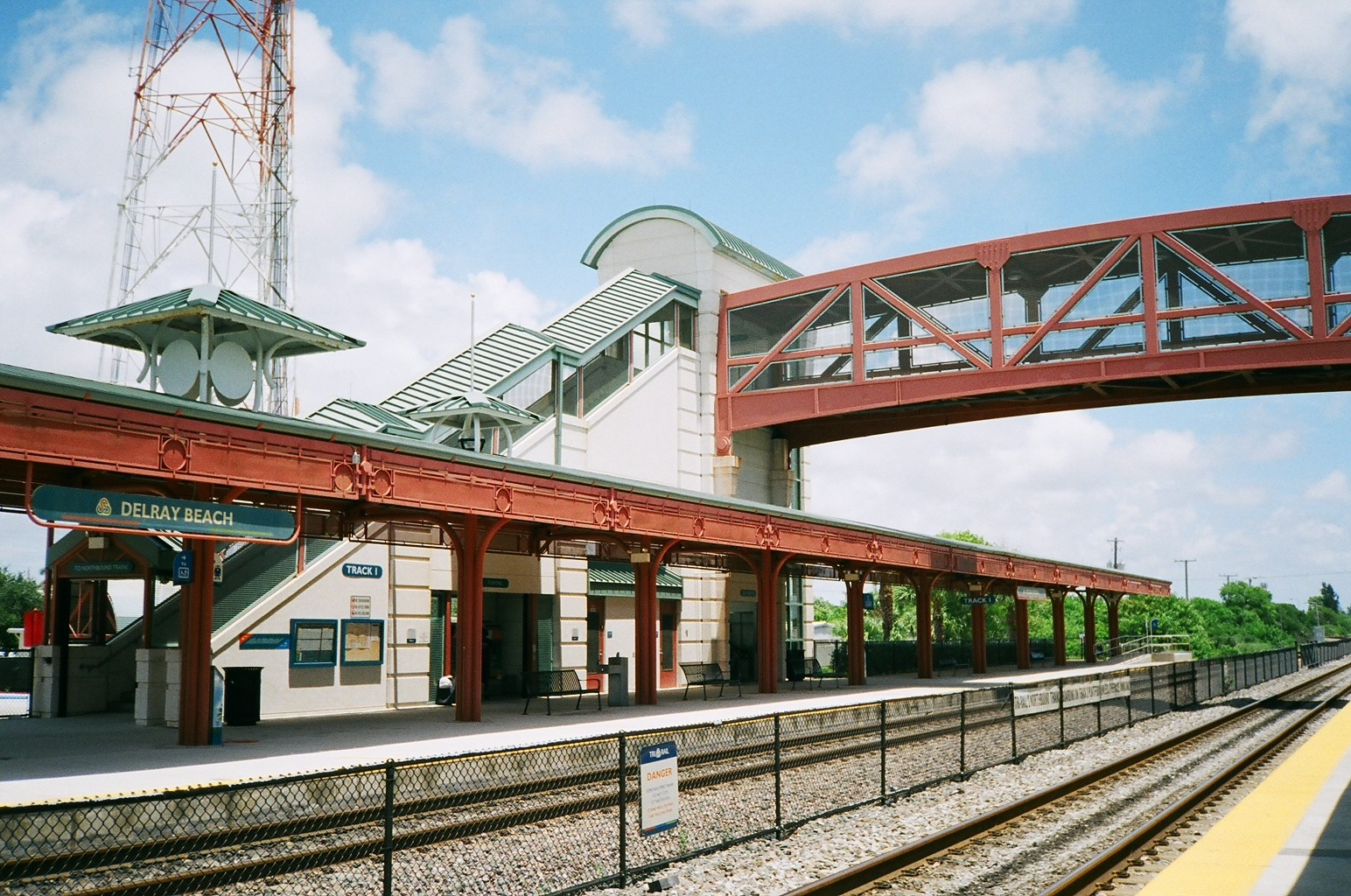
- Delray Beach station in 2013

General information
- Location: 345 South Congress Avenue; Delray Beach, Florida; United States
- Coordinates: 26.454215°N 80.090934°W
- Owner: Palm Beach County
- Line: South Florida Rail Corridor
- Platforms: 2 side platforms
- Tracks: 2
- Connections: Palm Tran: 2, 70, 81, 88

Construction
- Parking: 127 spaces
- Accessible: Yes

Other information
- Station code: Amtrak: DLB
- Fare zone: Boynton Beach–Delray Beach (Tri-Rail)

History
- Opened: January 8, 1927
- Rebuilt: August 26, 1991; 2003–2005

Passengers
- FY 2025: 13,831 (Amtrak)

Services
Preceding station	Amtrak	Following station
Deerfield Beach toward Miami	Floridian	West Palm Beach toward Chicago
Deerfield Beach toward Miami	Silver Meteor	West Palm Beach toward New York
Preceding station	Tri-Rail	Following station
Boca Raton toward Miami Airport	Main Line	Boynton Beach toward Mangonia Park
Express does not stop here
Former services
Preceding station	Amtrak	Following station
Deerfield Beach toward Miami	Silver Star 1971–1984; 1991–2024	West Palm Beach toward New York
Deerfield Beach toward Miami	Palmetto 2002–2004	West Palm Beach toward New York
Deerfield Beach toward Miami	Silver Palm 1996–2002	West Palm Beach toward New York
Deerfield Beach toward Miami	Sunset Limited 1993–1996	West Palm Beach toward Los Angeles
Deerfield Beach toward Miami	Silver Palm 1982–1985	West Palm Beach toward Tampa
Deerfield Beach toward Miami	Floridian 1971–1979	West Palm Beach toward Chicago
Preceding station	Seaboard Air Line Railroad	Following station
Deerfield Beach toward Miami	Main Line	Boynton Beach toward Richmond
Future services
Preceding station	Tri-Rail	Following station
Boca Raton toward Downtown Miami	Red Line (proposed)	Boynton Beach toward Mangonia Park
- Seaboard Air Line Railway Station
- U.S. National Register of Historic Places
- Location: Depot Avenue, Delray Beach, Florida
- Coordinates: 26.463192°N 80.090914°W
- Built: 1926–1927
- Architect: Gustav Maass
- Architectural style: Mediterranean Revival
- NRHP reference No.: 86002172
- Added to NRHP: September 4, 1986
Location
- Location of the current station

Delray Beach station is a train station located off South Congress Avenue (SR 807) in Delray Beach, Florida. It is served by Tri-Rail commuter rail service plus two daily Amtrak intercity trains – the Floridian and Silver Meteor. The station has two side platforms, with parking and a bus loop to the west of the southbound platform. The former station building, located to the north, has been reused as municipal offices.

The original Seaboard Air Line Railroad (SAL) station opened in 1927 as part of the railroad's extension to the east coast of Florida. It was designed by Gustav Maass of the West Palm Beach architectural firm of Harvey & Clarke in the Mediterranean Revival style. Amtrak took over passenger service in 1971, with 1–3 daily round trips stopping at Delray Beach. The station was added to the National Register of Historic Places in 1986 as Seaboard Air Line Railway Station.

An architect purchased the station building in 1888. Tri-Rail service began in 1989, but moved to a new station to the south in 1991 after a dispute with the owner. Amtrak relocated to the newer station in 1995. It was rebuilt with a second platform and a footbridge in 2003–2005. The former station building passed through several private owners and was purchased by the city in 2005. After being damaged by arson in 2020; it was rebuilt from 2021 to 2024 for use as municipal offices.

== Station design ==
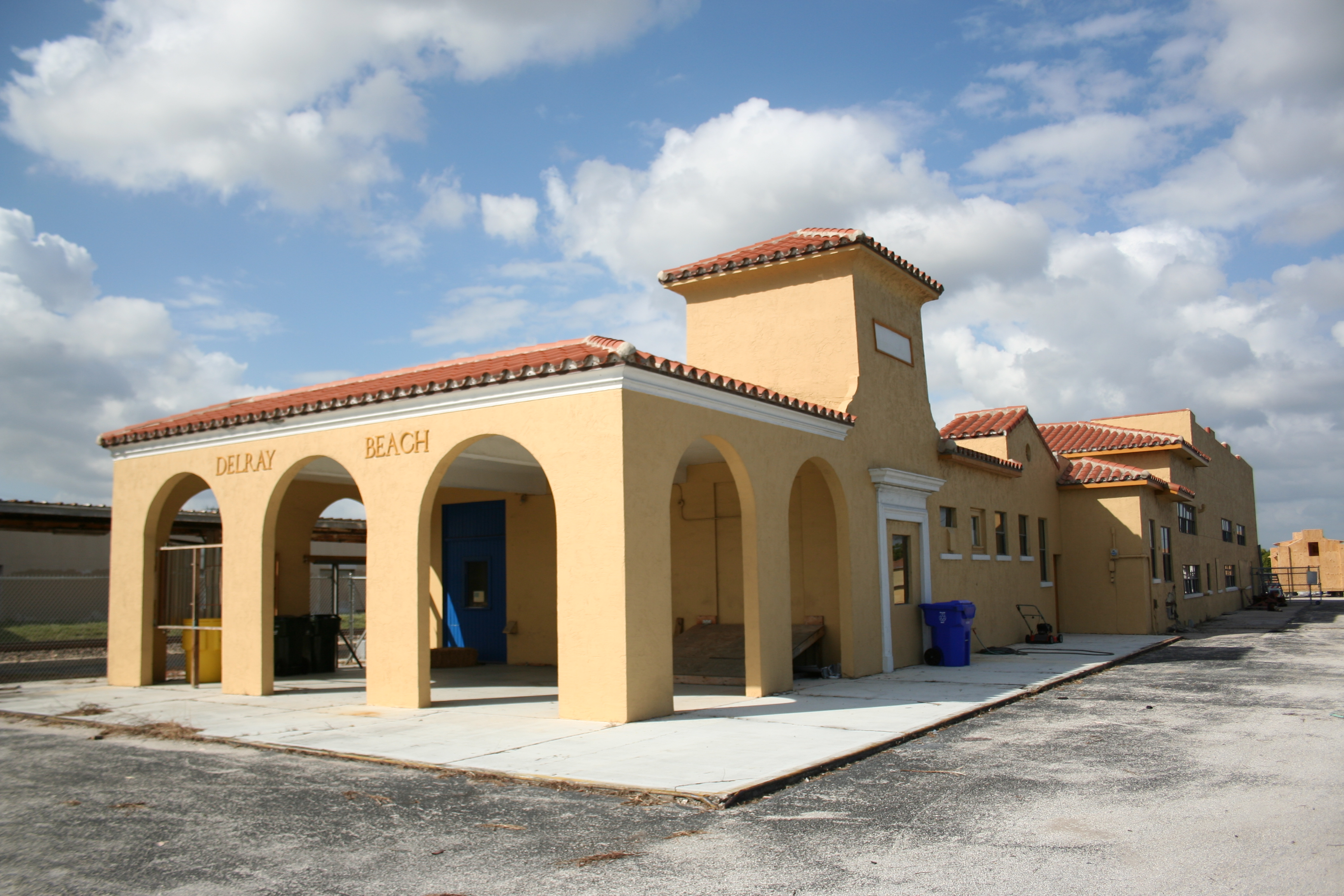
The former station building in 2011

The current station is located east of South Congress Avenue (SR 807) about 0.5 miles (0.8 km) south of West Atlantic Avenue (SR 806). It has two side platforms serving the two tracks of the South Florida Rail Corridor, which runs north-south through the station. A footbridge connects the platforms. A 127-space parking lot and bus loop are located on the west side of the station.

The former station building is located north of West Atlantic Avenue on the north side of the tracks. It is constructed of stucco over a wood frame in the Mediterranean Revival style. When in railroad use, the north portion of the building was a freight warehouse. The south portion contained two waiting rooms, which were originally segregated by race, with separate entrances and bathrooms. An office with ticket counters was located between the waiting rooms. At the southern end of the station was an open arcade. Two small square towers were located over the southern waiting room, with an octagonal tower over the office. A 400-foot (120 m)-long canopy was located next to the tracks. The building has been modified by several renovations; the canopy was removed in the reconstruction after the 2020 fire.

== History ==
=== Original station ===
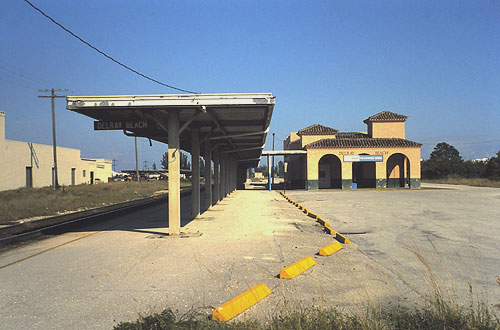
Delray Beach station in 1979

During the 1920s Florida land boom, the Seaboard Air Line Railroad (SAL) extended into southern Florida with the construction of the East Coast Extension (Florida Western and Northern Railroad and Seaboard–All Florida Railway). Construction of the latter line through Delray (soon merged as Delray Beach) began in early 1926. Plans for the Delray station were completed in August 1926. Freight service began in November 1926; passenger service began on January 8, 1927, with the Orange Blossom Special. Delray station was designed by Gustav Maass of the West Palm Beach architectural firm of Harvey & Clarke. Built in the Mediterranean Revival style, it was nearly identical to nearby stations at Deerfield Beach and Boynton Beach. The north portion of the building was originally a covered freight platform; it was enclosed and remodeled in 1958.

The SAL and rival Atlantic Coast Line Railroad merged into the Seaboard Coast Line Railroad in 1967. By 1970, Delray Beach was served by 4–5 daily round trips: the New York–Miami Silver Meteor and Silver Star plus the seasonal Florida Special; and the Chicago–Miami South Wind and City of Miami (on alternating days). Amtrak took over intercity passenger service on May 1971, retaining all except the City of Miami. The South Wind was changed to daily operation; it became the Floridian later in 1971. The Silver Meteor ceased stopping at Delray Beach effective December 15, 1972. Seasonal winter service – called the Florida Special, Vacationer, and finally Miamian – that operated during Amtrak's first four years did not stop at Delray Beach.

The access road to the station from West Atlantic Avenue (SR 806) was cut off in the 1970s by the construction of the interchange with Interstate 95, leaving only a less-convenient driveway from Mount Ida Road to the north. The Floridian was discontinued on October 9, 1979. The Tampa–Miami Silver Palm operated from November 21, 1982, to April 30, 1985, with Delray Beach as an intermediate stop. The Silver Meteor resumed stopping at Delray Beach on April 29, 1984, while the Silver Star ceased stopping. The station was added to the National Register of Historic Places on September 4, 1986, as Seaboard Airline Railroad Station. In early 1988, an architect purchased the station building for $196,000 and began restoration of the structure.

=== Relocation ===
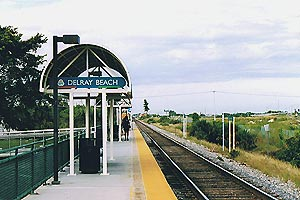
The 1991-opened station in 2002

Tri-Rail commuter service began on January 9, 1989, with the existing Amtrak station in Delray Beach as one of the intermediate stops. It was not intended to be the permanent location for the city's Tri-Rail stop. The city considered two proposals that year: constructing a $1.5 million access road from West Atlantic Avenue, or moving the station 0.6 miles (1.0 km) north to North Ida Road. Tri-Rail continued to use the property without a formal lease agreement. In December 1990, the private owners began charging for parking because they had not received any payment from Tri-Rail. Tri-Rail obtained a temporary injunction to stop the charging; the agency intended to build a temporary parking lot on other property nearby. The Silver Star resumed stopping at Delray Beach on April 6, 1991.

Tri-Rail ceased operations at Delray Beach on May 2, 1991, when the injunction expired; Amtrak trains continued to stop. At the time, the station had about 200 daily Tri-Rail boardings. The situation was complicated by a bank foreclosing on the property. Tri-Rail considered three sites for a replacement station; in mid-May, the county chose a site off South Congress Avenue adjacent to county administrative offices. The new station opened on August 26, 1991. The foreclosure auction for the old station took place the same day. The mortgage holder, American National Bank, purchased the property for $120,000. The sale was subject to Amtrak's right to continue to occupy the station until its contract with track owner CSX Transportation expired in 1996.

In 1992, the bank offered to sell the property to the Delray Beach Historic Society for $200,000 – half the asking price – for use as a railroad museum. However, the society did not have the funds to buy and renovate the station. Amtrak proposed in October 1993 to close the station due to low ridership and the poor condition of the building. The station agents were withdrawn in November 1993, but Amtrak trains continued to stop. A family trust purchased the building for $180,000 in December 1993. By that time, the structure was boarded up; the roof leaked and had collapsed in one section. The tri-weekly Sunset Limited was extended to Miami on April 4, 1993, with Delray Beach among the added stops. On April 2, 1995, Amtrak service was relocated to the Tri-Rail station.

=== Later changes ===
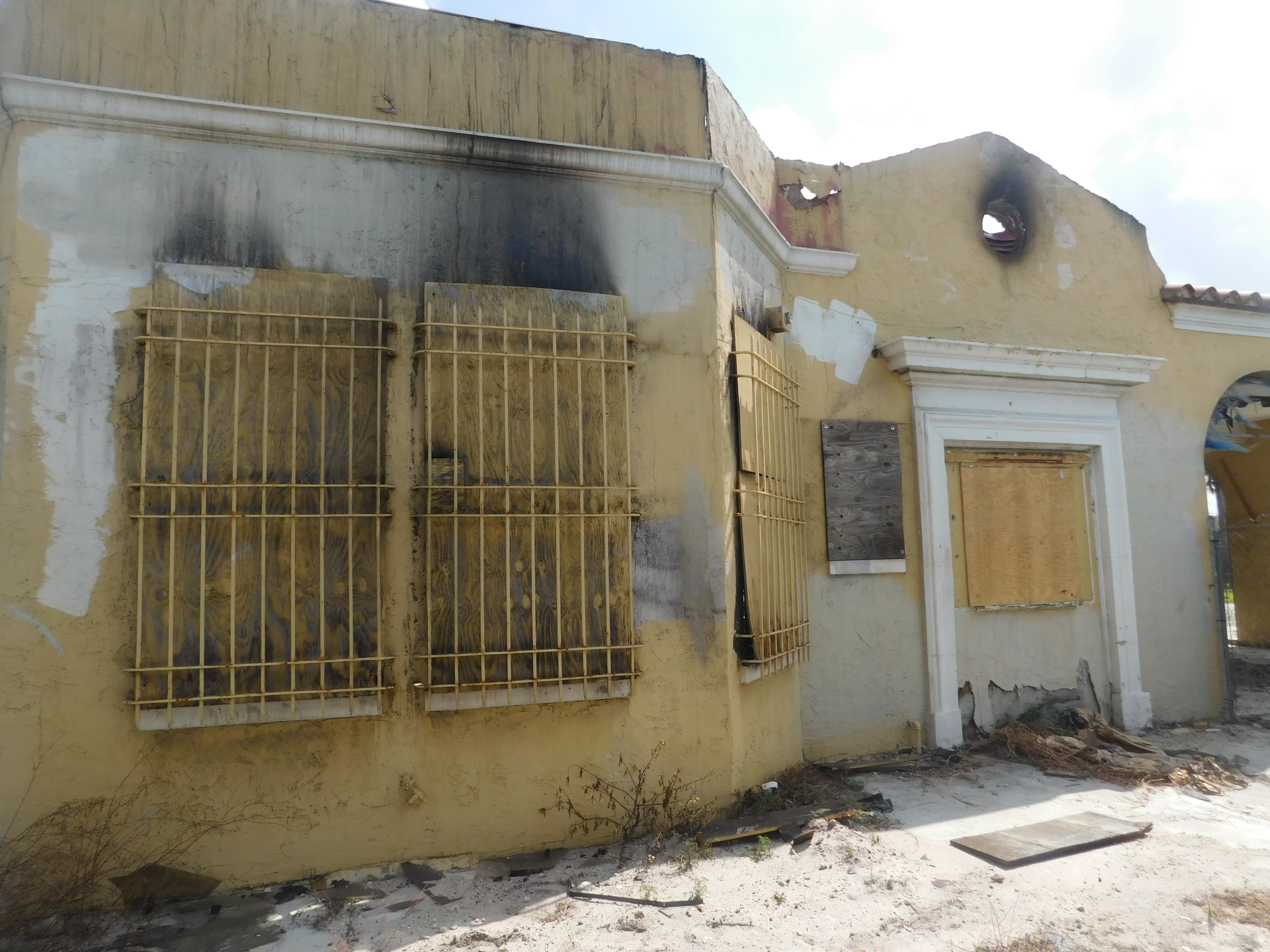
Fire damage to the former station in 2020

The Sunset Limited was cut back to Sanford on November 10, 1996; the same day, Amtrak began operating the Silver Palm, a third daily New York–Miami train. The Silver Palm was renamed Palmetto in 2002; it was cut back to Savannah, Georgia, on November 1, 2004, leaving Delray Beach with two daily Amtrak round trips. On November 10, 2024, the Silver Star was merged with the Capitol Limited as the Floridian.

In the mid-1990s, the South Florida Regional Transportation Authority (SFRTA) – which operates Tri-Rail – began a project to double track the Tri-Rail corridor. The agency awarded a $231 million contract for the Palm Beach County segment in August 2001. Several stations were modified in 2003–2005 with a second platform and a footbridge. Those at Delray Beach, Boynton Beach, Boca Raton, Lake Worth, Mangonia Park, and West Palm Beach were all built to the same design. The rebuilt Delray Beach station cost about $4.5 million. In 2010, the state proposed to build a 395-space parking deck at the station by 2015. In 2020, the SFRTA identified the station as a long-term opportunity for transit-oriented development.

The former station building was sold in April 1996 for $325,000. The new owner made $100,000 in renovations and began using it as an office and storage space that December. It was sold several more times in the following decade. In May 2005, the city purchased the building for $1.575 million. The city used it for storage but planned a restoration. On February 25, 2020, the building was significantly damaged by a fire set by four teenagers. In January 2021, the city approved plans for a $2.6 million restoration to convert the building into municipal offices. It was partially funded by $1.8 million in insurance money. The renovations were completed in November 2024.
