= Deerfield Beach station =

Railway station in Florida, US

Deerfield Beach

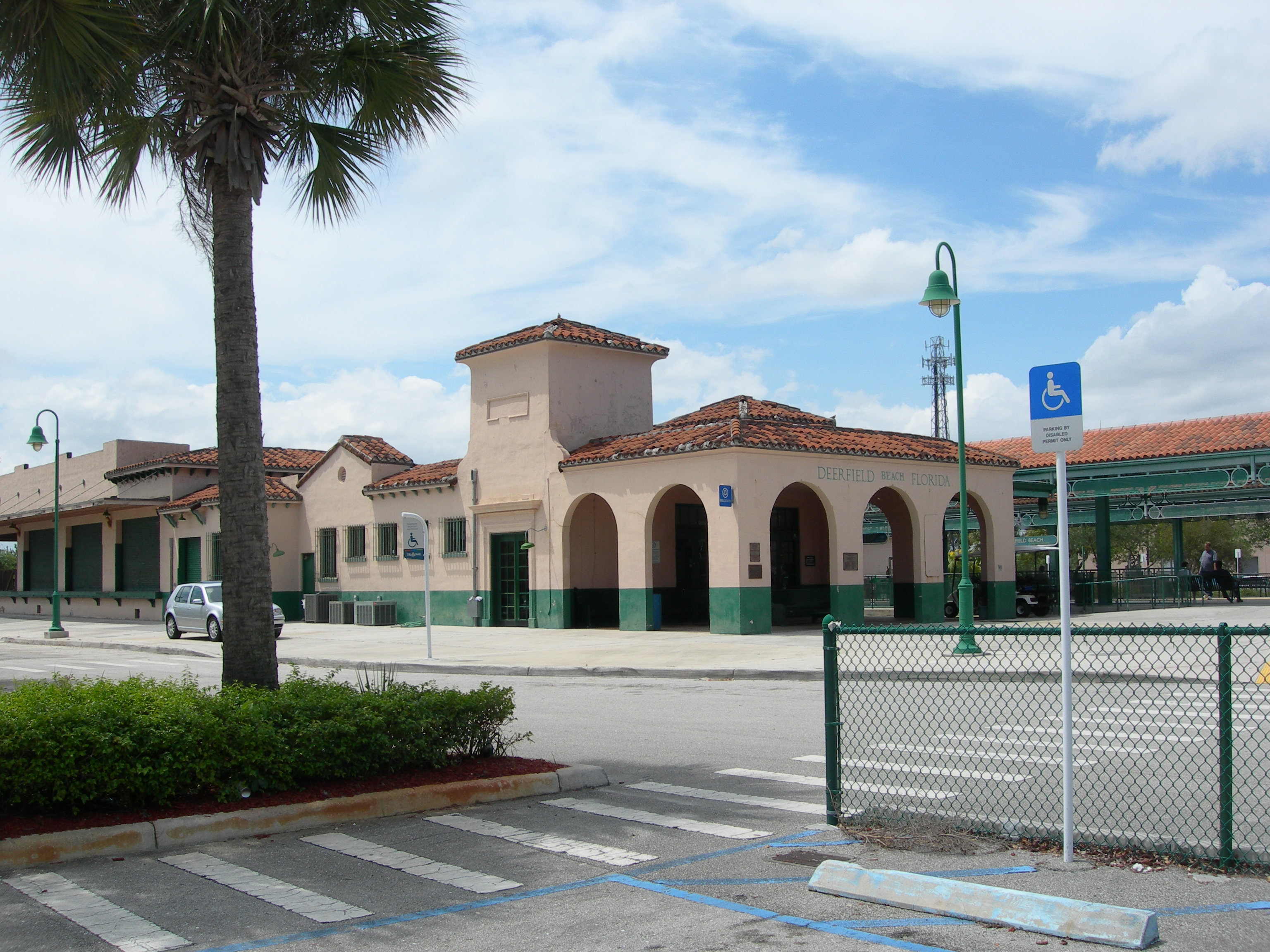
- Deerfield Beach station in March 2008

General information
- Location: 1300 West Hillsboro Boulevard; Deerfield Beach, Florida; United States
- Coordinates: 26°19′01″N 80°7′20″W
- Owner: State of Florida
- Line: South Florida Rail Corridor
- Platforms: 2 side platforms
- Tracks: 2
- Connections: Broward County Transit: 48; SFRTA Shuttle: DB 1, DB 2, Deerfield Beach Express I

Construction
- Accessible: Yes

Other information
- Station code: Amtrak: DFB
- Fare zone: Boca Raton–Pompano Beach (Tri-Rail)

History
- Opened: 1926
- Rebuilt: 1990, 2010

Passengers
- FY 2025: 20,916 (Amtrak)

Services
Preceding station	Amtrak	Following station
Fort Lauderdale toward Miami	Floridian	Delray Beach toward Chicago
Fort Lauderdale toward Miami	Silver Meteor	Delray Beach toward New York
Preceding station	Tri-Rail	Following station
Pompano Beach toward Miami Airport	Main Line	Boca Raton toward Mangonia Park
Express does not stop here
Former services
Preceding station	Amtrak	Following station
Delray Beach toward Los Angeles	Sunset Limited 1993–1996	Fort Lauderdale toward Miami
Fort Lauderdale toward Miami	Palmetto 2002–2004	Delray Beach toward New York
Fort Lauderdale toward Miami	Silver Star until 2024	Delray Beach toward New York
Fort Lauderdale toward Miami	Floridian 1971–1979	Delray Beach toward Chicago
Preceding station	Seaboard Air Line Railroad	Following station
Pompano Beach toward Miami	Main Line	Delray Beach toward Richmond
Future services
Preceding station	Tri-Rail	Following station
Pompano Beach toward Downtown Miami	Red Line (proposed)	Boca Raton toward Mangonia Park
- Old Seaboard Air Line Railway Station
- U.S. National Register of Historic Places
- Interactive map of Old Seaboard Air Line Railway Station
- Location: Deerfield Beach, Florida
- Architect: Gustav Maass
- Architectural style: Mediterranean Revival
- NRHP reference No.: 90000597
- Added to NRHP: 5 April 1990
Location

Deerfield Beach station is a train station in Deerfield Beach, Florida. It is served by Amtrak intercity rail and Tri-Rail commuter rail trains. It is listed on the National Register of Historic Places as Old Deerfield Beach Seaboard Air Line Railway Station.

== Station layout ==
The station has two side platforms, with parking lots on either side. Buses stop along a bus loop to the west of the southbound platform, while the station house sits adjacent to the northbound platform. A sidewalk grade crossing at the north end of the station provides access between platforms.

== History ==
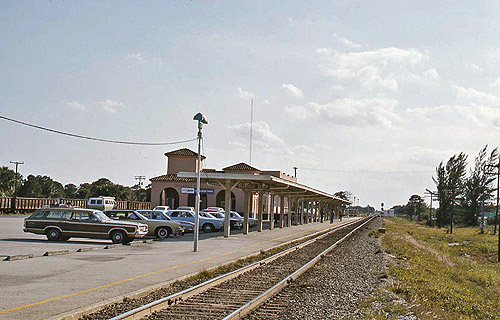
The station in February 1974

Located at 1300 West Hillsboro Boulevard (SR 810), just east of North Military Trail (SR 809), the station was built in 1926 by the Seaboard Air Line Railway. It shares the same Mediterranean Revival design as the Delray Beach Seaboard station and the Homestead Seaboard station. Those design features include arched entryways, arcades, stucco walls and a barrel-tiled roof. The station was placed on the U.S. National Register of Historic Places on April 5, 1990. It serves the nearby Boca Raton community .

The historic Seaboard Air Line Railway Station also houses the South Florida Railway Museum.

In 2010, the Florida Department of Transportation finished a restoration of the historic station. The $380,000 project included a new roof, interior improvements to the lobby and restrooms, repairs to the exterior walls and installation of new air conditioning units. On November 10, 2024, the Silver Star was merged with the Capitol Limited as the Floridian.
