= Mangonia Park, Florida =

Town in the state of Florida, United States

- Town
- Town of Mangonia Park
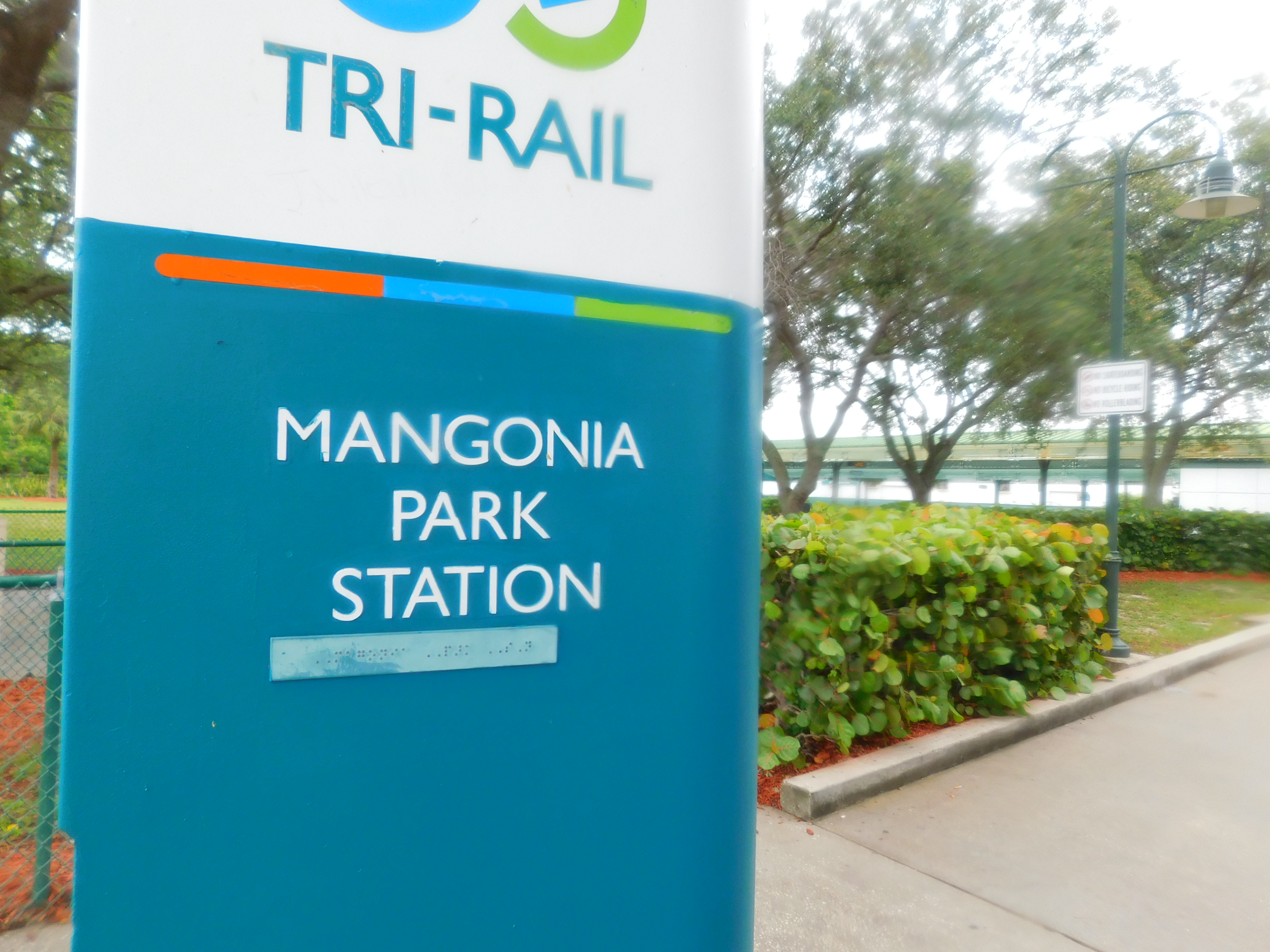
- Tri-Rail stop at the Mangonia Park Station

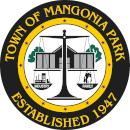
- Seal

- Location of Mangonia Park in Palm Beach County, Florida
- Coordinates: 26°45′31″N 80°04′34″W
- Country: United States
- State: Florida
- County: Palm Beach
- Settled (Magnolia Park): c. early 1900s-1930s
- Incorporation (Town of Mangonia Park): 1947

Government
  - Type: Council-Manager
  - Mayor: William H. Albury, III
  - Vice Mayor: Kelisha Buchanan-Webb
  - Council Members: Sarita C. Johnson, Clarence R. McConnell, and Lisa Davis-Quince
  - Town Manager: Kenneth Metcalf
  - Town Clerk: Sherry Albury

Area
  - Total: 0.75 sq mi (1.94 km^{2})
  - Land: 0.75 sq mi (1.94 km^{2})
  - Water: 0 sq mi (0.00 km^{2})
- Elevation: 16 ft (4.9 m)

Population (2020)
  - Total: 2,142
  - Density: 2,862.5/sq mi (1,105.23/km^{2})
- Time zone: UTC-5 (Eastern (EST))
  - Summer (DST): UTC-4 (EDT)
- ZIP code: 33407
- Area codes: 561, 728
- FIPS code: 12-42900
- GNIS feature ID: 2406088
- Website: tompfl.com

Mangonia Park is a town in Palm Beach County, Florida, United States. It is a part of the Miami metropolitan area of South Florida as well as Uptown West Palm, which includes the cities of Riviera Beach and West Palm Beach. As of the 2020 census, the population recorded by the U.S. Census Bureau was 2,142.

== History ==
The Town of Mangonia Park was established in 1947. The original petition to the State of Florida requested the name Town of Magnolia Park. The petition for incorporation was granted but under the name Town of Mangonia Park. An explanation accompanied the charter stating the name, Town of Magnolia Park, was already taken and the State of Florida took the liberty of naming the town with a similar name, especially since there were many farms in the area that grew an abundance of mango groves from the early 1900s through the 1930s.

== Government ==
It has a Town Council-Town Manager type of local government, with council members elected to five "at-large" seats that serve three year staggered terms. Municipal elections are held in March of each year by the Palm Beach County Supervisor of Elections Office.

== Geography ==
Town of Mangonia Park is located in north central Palm Beach County.

According to the United States Census Bureau, the town has a total area of 0.7 square miles (1.8 km^{2}), all land.

== Demographics ==
Historical population
Census	Pop.	Note	%±
1950	348		—
1960	594		70.7%
1970	827		39.2%
1980	1,419		71.6%
1990	1,453		2.4%
2000	1,283		−11.7%
2010	1,888		47.2%
2020	2,142		13.5%
U.S. Decennial Census

=== Racial and ethnic composition ===
Mangonia Park town, Florida – Racial and ethnic composition Note: the US Census treats Hispanic/Latino as an ethnic category. This table excludes Latinos from the racial categories and assigns them to a separate category. Hispanics/Latinos may be of any race.
Race / Ethnicity (NH = Non-Hispanic)	Pop 2000	Pop 2010	Pop 2020	% 2000	% 2010	% 2020
White alone (NH)	157	127	111	12.24%	6.73%	5.18%
Black or African American alone (NH)	974	1,535	1,743	75.92%	81.30%	81.37%
Native American or Alaska Native alone (NH)	4	1	2	0.31%	0.05%	0.09%
Asian alone (NH)	4	4	2	0.31%	0.21%	0.09%
Native Hawaiian or Pacific Islander alone (NH)	0	1	2	0.00%	0.05%	0.09%
Other race alone (NH)	9	0	5	0.70%	0.00%	0.23%
Mixed race or Multiracial (NH)	18	46	63	1.40%	2.44%	2.94%
Hispanic or Latino (any race)	117	174	214	9.12%	9.22%	9.99%
Total	1,283	1,888	2,142	100.00%	100.00%	100.00%

=== 2020 census ===
As of the 2020 census, Mangonia Park had a population of 2,142. The median age was 30.8 years. 33.3% of residents were under age 18 and 9.0% were age 65 or older. For every 100 females, there were 81.2 males, and for every 100 females age 18 and over, there were 71.2 males.

100.0% of residents lived in urban areas, while 0.0% lived in rural areas.

There were 693 households in Mangonia Park, of which 51.4% had children under the age of 18 living in them. Of all households, 26.3% were married-couple households, 16.2% were households with a male householder and no spouse or partner present, and 50.4% were households with a female householder and no spouse or partner present. About 18.5% of all households were made up of individuals and 4.1% had someone living alone who was 65 years of age or older.

There were 750 housing units, of which 7.6% were vacant. The homeowner vacancy rate was 3.3% and the rental vacancy rate was 6.1%.

According to 2020 American Community Survey estimates, there were 675 households and 474 families residing in the town.

=== 2010 census ===
According to 2010 American Community Survey estimates, there were 571 households and 369 families residing in the town.

=== 2000 census ===
As of the census of 2000, there were 1,283 people, 443 households, and 322 families residing in the town. The population density was 1,809.7 inhabitants per square mile (698.7/km^{2}). There were 490 housing units at an average density of 691.2 per square mile (266.9/km^{2}). The racial makeup of the town was 14.58% White (12.2% were Non-Hispanic White), 76.70% African American, 0.70% Native American, 0.31% Asian, 6.16% from other races, and 1.56% from two or more races. Hispanic or Latino of any race were 9.12% of the population.

In 2000, there were 443 households, out of which 39.3% had children under the age of 18 living with them, 34.1% were married couples living together, 30.5% had a female householder with no husband present, and 27.3% were non-families. 17.8% of all households were made up of individuals, and 4.5% had someone living alone who was 65 years of age or older. The average household size was 2.90 and the average family size was 3.20.

In 2000, in the town, the population was spread out, with 31.3% under the age of 18, 9.4% from 18 to 24, 31.3% from 25 to 44, 20.1% from 45 to 64, and 7.9% who were 65 years of age or older. The median age was 32 years. For every 100 females, there were 88.4 males. For every 100 females age 18 and over, there were 89.1 males.

As of 2000, the median income for a household in the town was $35,865, and the median income for a family was $34,688. Males had a median income of $21,083 versus $24,750 for females. The per capita income for the town was $14,864. About 16.7% of families and 19.2% of the population were below the poverty line, including 25.8% of those under age 18 and 21.1% of those age 65 or over.

As of 2000, speakers of English as a first language accounted for 80.47% of all residents, while Spanish comprised 11.04%, French Creole consisted of 7.61%, and the mother tongue of French made up 0.85% of the population.

As of 2000, Mangonia Park had the ninety-first highest percentage of Black and African American residents in the U.S., with 76.70% of the populace (tied with Hanley Hills, MO and Berkeley, MO). It had the eighteenth highest percentage of Haitian residents in the U.S. at 9.10% of the town's population (tied with Lauderhill), and the thirty-fourth highest percentage of Jamaican residents in the U.S. at 3.90% of its population (which tied with Redan, Georgia and Somerset, New Jersey). It also had the twenty-seventh most Guatemalans in the U.S. at 3.82% of all residents.

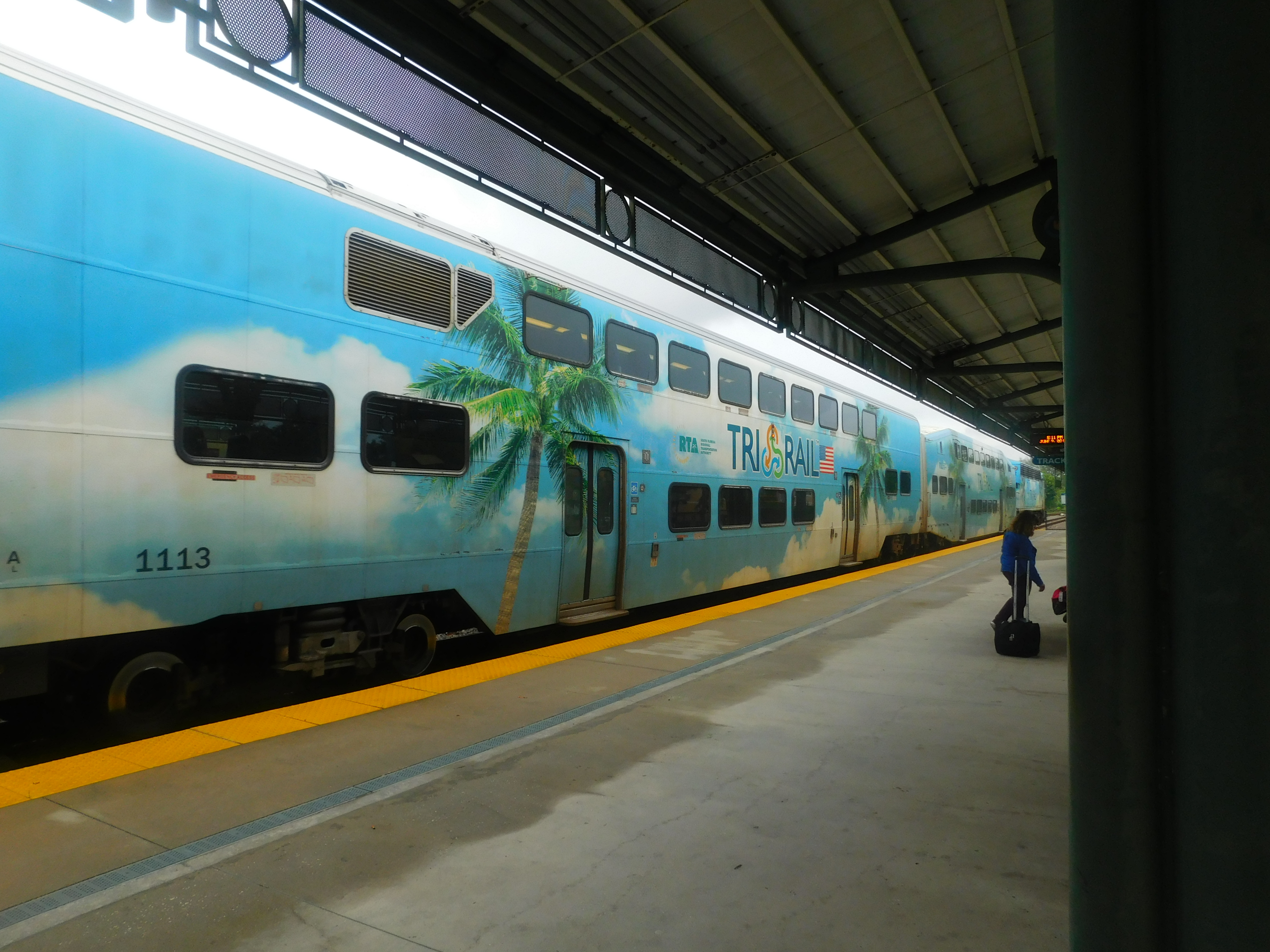
Tri-Rail Commuter Train at Mangonia Park Station.

== Transportation ==
Mangonia Park is home to the Mangonia Park Station, the northern terminus of the Tri-Rail commuter rail system operated by SFRTA. It is also served by several bus routes operated by PalmTran, including Routes 20, 31, and 33.
