= Fort Lauderdale station =

Train station in Florida

Ft. Lauderdale

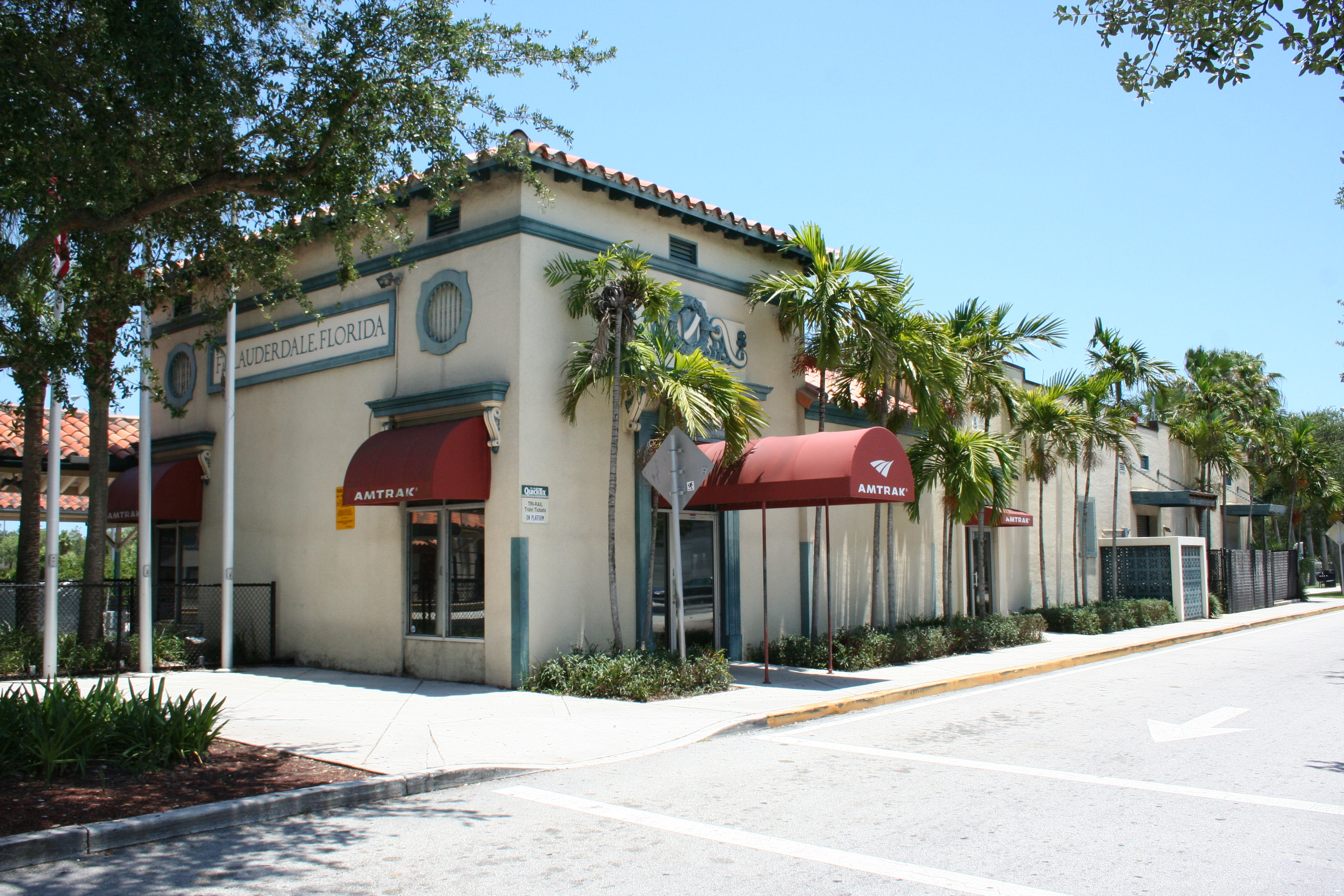
- Northwest view of historic former Seaboard Air Line Railway (now Amtrak) station

General information
- Location: 200 Southwest 21st Terrace; Fort Lauderdale, Florida; United States
- Coordinates: 26°7′10.09″N 80°10′11.54″W
- Owner: Florida Department of Transportation
- Line: South Florida Rail Corridor
- Platforms: 2 side platforms
- Tracks: 2
- Train operators: Amtrak, Tri-Rail
- Connections: Broward County Transit: 22; Metrobus: 95

Construction
- Parking: Yes
- Cycle facilities: Racks
- Accessible: Yes

Other information
- Station code: Amtrak: FTL
- IATA code: ZFT
- Fare zone: Cypress Creek–Fort Lauderdale (Tri-Rail)

History
- Opened: 1927
- Rebuilt: 1986

Passengers
- FY 2025: 45,989 (Amtrak)

Services
Preceding station	Amtrak	Following station
Hollywood toward Miami	Floridian	Deerfield Beach toward Chicago
Hollywood toward Miami	Silver Meteor	Deerfield Beach toward New York
Preceding station	Tri-Rail	Following station
Fort Lauderdale Airport toward Miami Airport	Main Line	Cypress Creek toward Mangonia Park
Express does not stop here
Former services
Preceding station	Amtrak	Following station
Deerfield Beach toward Los Angeles	Sunset Limited 1993–1996	Hollywood toward Miami
Hollywood toward Miami	Palmetto 2002–2004	Deerfield Beach toward New York
Hollywood toward Miami	Silver Star	Deerfield Beach toward New York
Hollywood toward Miami	Floridian	Deerfield Beach toward Chicago
Preceding station	Seaboard Air Line Railroad	Following station
Opa Locka toward Miami	Main Line	Pompano Beach toward Richmond
Location

Fort Lauderdale station is a train station in Fort Lauderdale, Florida. It is served by Tri-Rail and Amtrak. The station is located on Southwest 21st Terrace, just south of West Broward Boulevard. The station has two side platforms connected by an elevated passageway. The station building, parking lot, and bus stops are located west of the southbound platform.

== History ==
The Orange Blossom Special arrives at the temporary Seaboard Air Line Railway Fort Lauderdale station in 1927.

The original station, which is used by Amtrak, is a former Seaboard Air Line Railway depot built in 1927. Designed in the prevalent Mediterranean Revival style by Gustav Maass of the West Palm Beach architectural firm Harvey & Clarke, it is virtually identical to the Hollywood Seaboard station to the south. The station took the place of a temporary structure that had been hastily erected at the end of 1926 to greet the January 1927 arrival of the first Seaboard passenger train in South Florida, the Orange Blossom Special.

The station was served by the Orange Blossom Special until 1953 and, among other Seaboard trains, the Silver Meteor beginning in 1939. Amtrak maintained Silver Meteor service to the station when it took over intercity passenger train service in 1971. Both the Silver Meteor and Amtrak's Floridian continue to use the station.

On January 9, 1989, the Tri-County Commuter Rail Authority began Tri-Rail service to the station, building additional facilities and a pedestrian overpass just north of the original station. A park and ride lot is available, and is directly accessible via a proprietary exit from Interstate 95 north.

The station consists of a passenger waiting room on the northern end and a baggage room in the center section. On the southern end is a freight room, which is used by CSX, the successor to Seaboard. Just south of the street side entry to the passenger waiting room, and representative of the racial segregation laws of the era in which the station was constructed, is the entrance to what had been the "colored" waiting room.

On November 10, 2024, the Silver Star was merged with the Capitol Limited as the Floridian.
