= Lake Worth Beach station =

Commuter rail station in Florida, United States

Lake Worth Beach

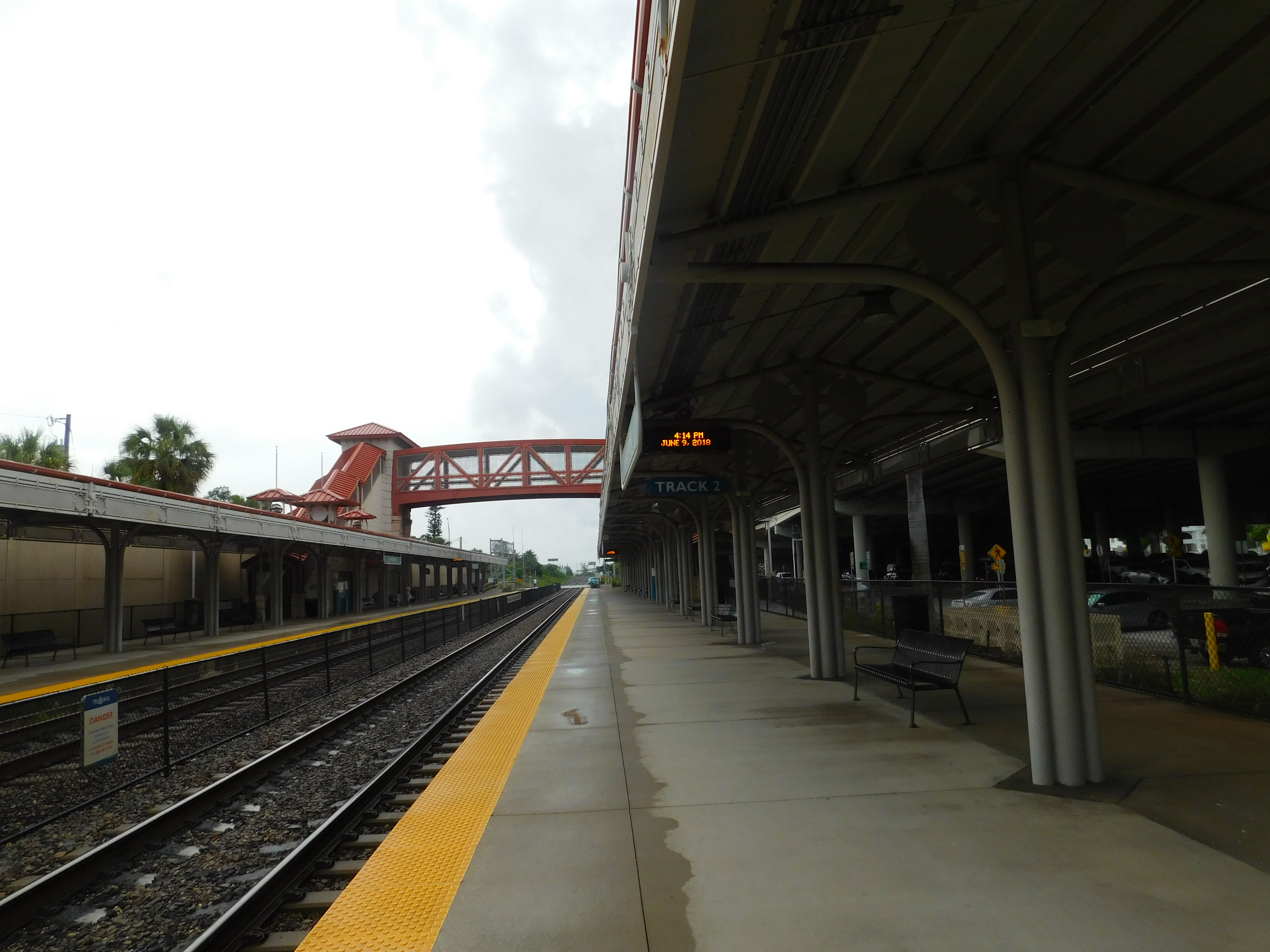
- Lake Worth station in June 2018

General information
- Location: 1703 Lake Worth Road; Lake Worth Beach, Florida
- Coordinates: 26.616131°N 80.069135°W
- Line: South Florida Rail Corridor
- Platforms: 2 side platforms
- Tracks: 2
- Connections: Palm Tran: 60, 62; SFRTA Shuttle: LK1

Construction
- Parking: Yes
- Accessible: Yes

Other information
- Fare zone: Mangonia Park–Lake Worth Beach (Tri-Rail)

History
- Opened: 1989

Services
Preceding station	Tri-Rail	Following station
Boynton Beach toward Miami Airport	Main Line	West Palm Beach toward Mangonia Park
Express does not stop here
Future services
Preceding station	Tri-Rail	Following station
Boynton Beach toward Downtown Miami	Red Line (proposed)	West Palm Beach toward Mangonia Park
Location

Lake Worth Beach station is a Tri-Rail commuter rail station in Lake Worth Beach, Florida, at the confluence of Lake Worth Road (SR 802) and Interstate 95. Opening to service January 9, 1989, parking is available at this station, all of which is beneath I-95 on the south side of Lake Worth Road.

== Station layout ==
The station has two side platforms and a parking lot east of the northbound platform, located underneath the Interstate 95 overpass. Access to the station is from the northbound platform, with an overpass connecting to the southbound platform.

== Accidents and incidents ==
On January 4, 2016, A Tri-Rail passenger train derailed after colliding with a garbage truck which had broken down on a grade crossing. Twenty-two people were injured.
