= Boynton Beach station =

Commuter rail station in Boynton Beach, Florida

Boynton Beach

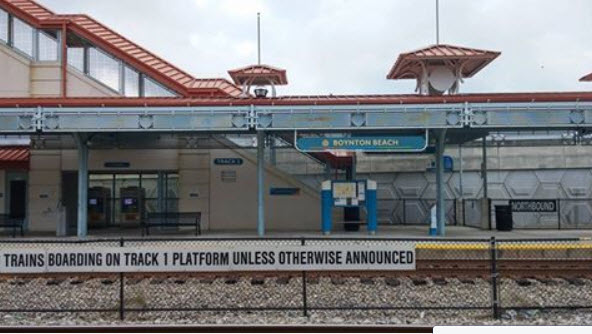
- Station platforms in 2016

General information
- Location: 2800 High Ridge Road; Boynton Beach, Florida
- Coordinates: 26.553787°N 80.070575°W
- Line: South Florida Rail Corridor
- Platforms: 2 side platforms
- Tracks: 2
- Connections: Palm Tran: 70, 71

Construction
- Parking: Yes
- Accessible: Yes

Other information
- Fare zone: Boynton Beach–Delray Beach

History
- Opened: December 18, 1989
- Rebuilt: 2003

Services
Preceding station	Tri-Rail	Following station
Delray Beach toward Miami Airport	Main Line	Lake Worth Beach toward Mangonia Park
Express does not stop here
Future services
Preceding station	Tri-Rail	Following station
Delray Beach toward Downtown Miami	Red Line (proposed)	Lake Worth Beach toward Mangonia Park
Location

Boynton Beach station is a Tri-Rail commuter rail station in Boynton Beach, Florida. It is located off High Ridge Road, north of Gateway Boulevard and west of Interstate 95, on a side street leading from High Ridge Road known as Northwest Commerce Park Drive. It officially opened to service on December 18, 1989, and was remodeled in 2003. Parking is available at this station at the dead end of Northwest Commerce Park Drive, which loops in front of the station and has a bus lane along the loop.

== Station layout ==
The station has two side platforms, as well as a parking lot and bus loop to the west of the southbound platform. Access to the northbound platform is via an overpass above the tracks.
