= West Palm Beach station =

Train station in Florida, United States

West Palm Beach

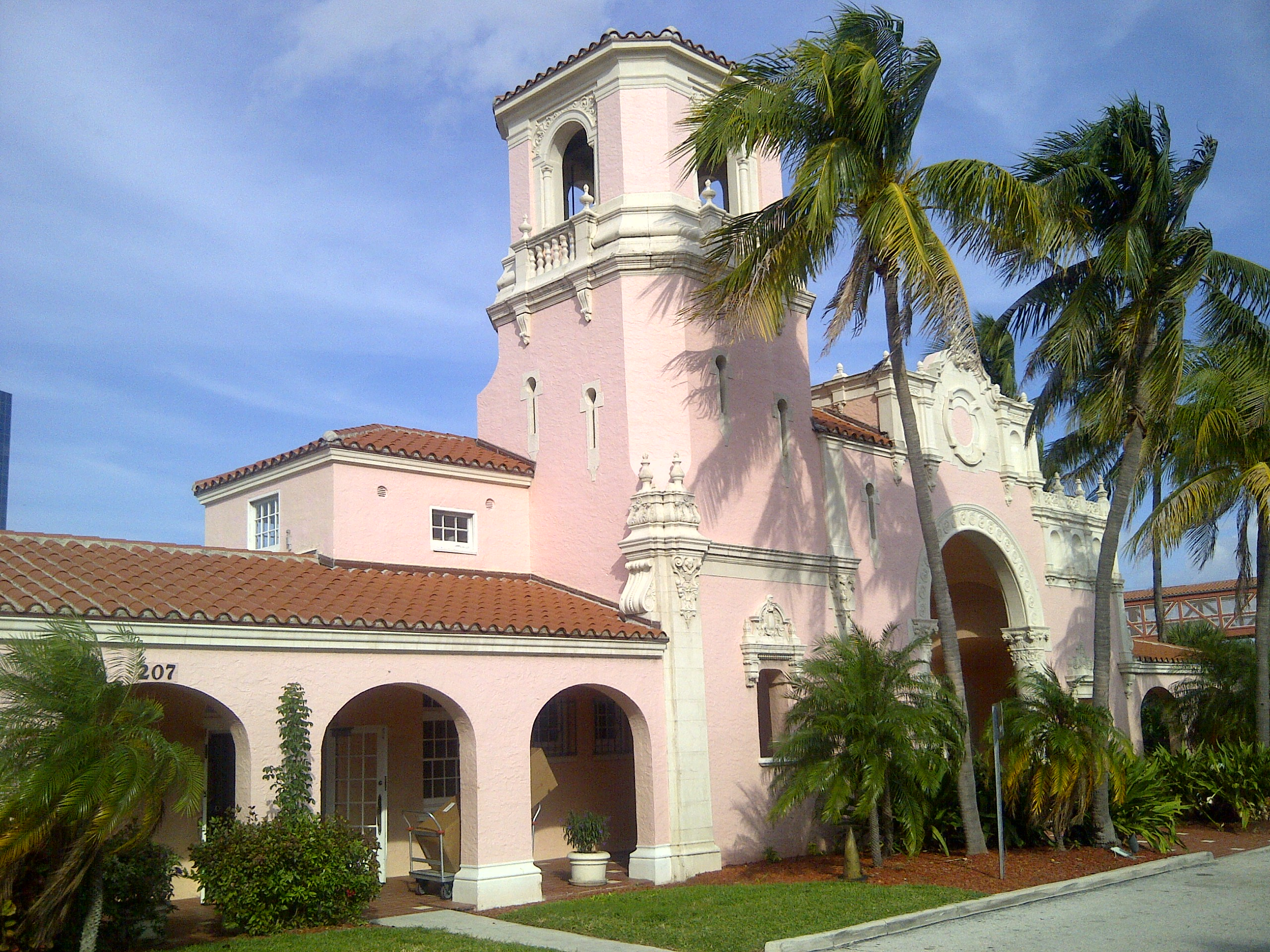
- West Palm Beach station in 2011

General information
- Location: 201 South Tamarind Avenue; West Palm Beach, Florida; United States
- Coordinates: 26°42′44.32″N 80°03′44.27″W
- Owner: City of West Palm Beach
- Line: South Florida Rail Corridor
- Platforms: 2 side platforms
- Tracks: 2
- Connections: Greyhound Lines; Palm Tran: 1, 2, 31, 40, 41, 43, 44, 45, 49

Construction
- Parking: Yes
- Cycle facilities: Yes
- Accessible: Yes

Other information
- Station code: Amtrak: WPB
- IATA code: ZWP
- Fare zone: Mangonia Park–Lake Worth Beach (Tri-Rail)

History
- Opened: 1925
- Rebuilt: 1991

Passengers
- FY 2025: 43,603 (Amtrak)

Services
Preceding station	Amtrak	Following station
Delray Beach toward Miami	Floridian	Okeechobee toward Chicago
Delray Beach toward Miami	Silver Meteor	Sebring toward New York
Preceding station	Tri-Rail	Following station
Lake Worth Beach toward Miami Airport	Main Line	Mangonia Park Terminus
Boca Raton toward MiamiCentral	Express	Terminus
Former services
Preceding station	Amtrak	Following station
Okeechobee toward Los Angeles	Sunset Limited 1993–1996	Delray Beach toward Miami
Delray Beach toward Miami	Palmetto 2002–2004	Okeechobee toward New York
Delray Beach toward Miami	Silver Star until 2024	Okeechobee toward New York
Delray Beach toward Miami	Floridian 1971–1979	Sebring toward Chicago
Preceding station	Seaboard Air Line Railroad	Following station
Palm Beach toward Miami	Main Line	Indiantown toward Richmond
Future services
Preceding station	Tri-Rail	Following station
Lake Worth Beach toward Downtown Miami	Red Line (proposed)	Mangonia Park Terminus
- Seaboard Coastline Railroad Passenger Station
- U.S. National Register of Historic Places
- Interactive map of Seaboard Coastline Railroad Passenger Station
- Built: 1925
- Architect: L. Philips Clarke, Harvey and Clarke
- Architectural style: Mission/Spanish Revival
- NRHP reference No.: 73000600
- Added to NRHP: June 19, 1973
Location

West Palm Beach station is a train station in West Palm Beach, Florida. It is served by Amtrak passenger rail and Tri-Rail commuter rail service. It is located at 203–209 South Tamarind Avenue, south of First Street/Banyan Boulevard. The former Seaboard Air Line Railway station building is listed on the National Register of Historic Places as Seaboard Coastline Railroad Passenger Station.

== History ==
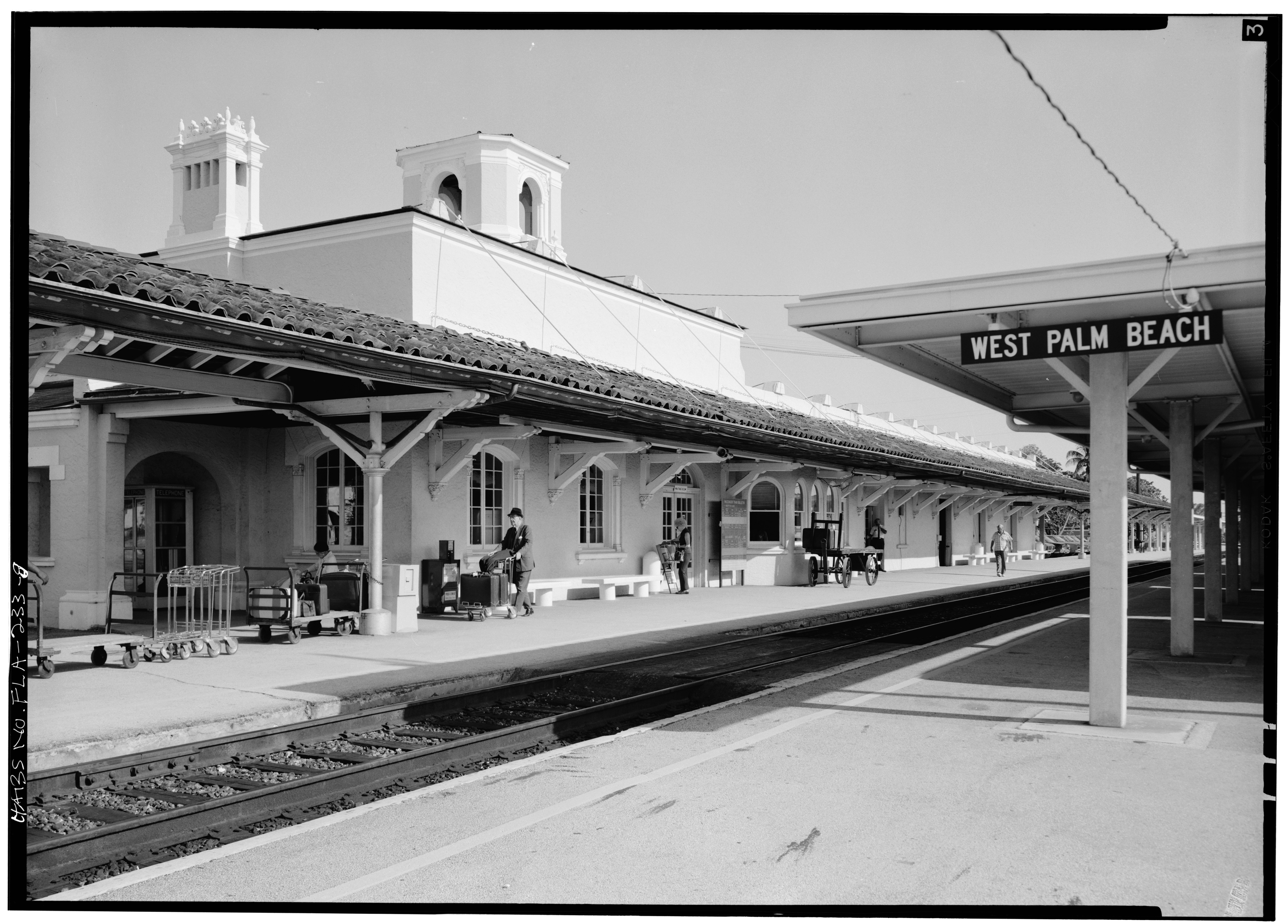
The station under operation by the Seaboard Airline Railway

The station officially opened to passengers in January 1925 as a Seaboard Air Line Railway depot. The building was designed by the Palm Beach architectural firm of Harvey & Clarke. Among other Seaboard trains, the station was served by the Orange Blossom Special until 1953, and the Silver Meteor beginning in 1939. Amtrak maintained Silver Meteor service to the station when it took over intercity passenger train service in 1971. The station was placed on the National Register of Historic Places on June 19, 1973. Tri-Rail service to the station began in 1989.

The City of West Palm Beach, following a purchase of the building in 1988, tapped local architecture firm Oliver Glidden & Partners to head a $4.3 million restoration of the structure. The project was completed and the station rededicated in a ceremony attended by the Florida Governor in April 1991. Architect Robert D. Brown directed the restoration of ornamental cast stone elements, exterior masonry, doors, windows, and iron and tile work. The red clay tile roof was replaced, as were the electrical, lighting, plumbing and heating, ventilation and air conditioning systems. Abatement of lead and asbestos was further required to bring the historic structure up to modern building code standards. The restoration effort earned the Florida Trust Award for Historic Preservation in 1994.

In summer 2012, the city finished an improvement project that included the installation of new sidewalks and more than five dozen trees around the building. The improvements were funded with a $750,000 Transportation Enhancement grant from the Federal Highway Administration, to which the city provided a $150,000 local match.

On November 10, 2024, the Silver Star was merged with the Capitol Limited as the Floridian.

== Station layout ==
The station has two side platforms, with access to the station on both sides. West of the southbound platform is a long loop of bus bays serving Palm Tran routes. East of the northbound platform is the station house, a small parking lot, and bus stops for Greyhound Lines buses and Tri-Rail shuttles.
