= The Mall at Wellington Green =

- Location: Wellington, Florida
- Coordinates: 26.64646°N 80.20831°W
- Address: 10300 West Forest Hill Boulevard
- Opened: October 5, 2001; 25 years ago
- Developer: Taubman Centers
- Manager: Spinoso Real Estate Group
- Architect: BKBC Architects, Inc.
- Num. of stores: 170+
- Num. of anchor tenants: 6
- Floor area: 1,273,000 square feet (118,300 m^{2})
- Floors: 2
- Parking: 7,600
- Website: shopwellingtongreen.com

The Mall at Wellington Green is a two-level super-regional shopping mall in Wellington, Florida. The mall features retailers Macy's, Dillard's, JCPenney, Ashley and City Furniture, in addition to CMX Cinemas.

== History ==
Upon opening on October 8, 2001, the mall's anchors were Burdines, Dillard's (which opened its first South Florida store at The Galleria at Fort Lauderdale in 1993 and Pembroke Lakes in 1995), JCPenney, and Lord & Taylor, whose store relocated from Palm Beach Mall.

Wellington Green, alongside Pembroke Lakes Mall, are among the few malls in South Florida that opened without a Jordan Marsh store because their Florida division went defunct before the openings of both malls. Burdines was dual branded as Burdines-Macy's in 2003, and simply Macy's in 2005. Lord & Taylor closed in 2004, and in 2007, that building was split into three tenants: City Furniture on the lower level, and Ashley Furniture and La-Z-Boy on the upper level. La-Z-Boy closed in 2014 to make room for Paragon Theaters, which opened on February 10, 2017, and was purchased by CMX Cinemas on September 19 of the same year.

Nordstrom opened in fall 2003, two years after the mall. Nordstrom closed in 2019.

=== Redevelopment plans ===
Prior to the COVID-19 pandemic, major plans were proposed to redevelop a plot of land extending outward from the former Nordstrom site into the mall parking lot. The expansion would have featured a Crystal Lagoon, apartments, restaurants, and outdoor entertainment activities. However, the plans were unpopular with environmentalist residents of Wellington and were eventually scrapped due to complications involving the pandemic. In 2023, redevelopment plans for the future were once again reported, with village manager Jim Barnes admitting "it’s not the mall it once was".

A new redevelopment plan was proposed in 2026 to convert the former Nordstrom site into a 620-unit apartment complex. The proposal was submitted by Bainbridge Communities and includes three seven-story apartment buildings, a clubhouse, and a parking garage across 18.4 acres (7.4 ha).

== Surrounding area ==
Several properties surrounding the mall include the Shoppes of Wellington Green, a lifestyle center, and Wellington Green Commons, a Whole Foods Market-anchored power center encircling the shopping mall.

== Current tenants ==
- Dillard's (original tenant) (since 2001)
- JCPenney (original tenant) (since 2001)
- Macy's (since 2005)
- Ashley Furniture (since 2007)
- City Furniture (since 2007)
- CMX Cinemas (since 2017)

== Former tenants ==
- Lord & Taylor (original tenant) (2001-2004) (Replaced by La-Z-Boy, City Furniture, and Ashley Furniture Home Store)
- Burdines (original tenant) (2001-2003) (Rebranded as Burdines-Macy's)
- La-Z-Boy (2007-2014) (Replaced by Paragon Theaters)
- Burdines-Macy's (2003-2005) (Rebranded as Macy's)
- Paragon Theaters (2017) (Replaced by CMX Cinemas)
- Nordstrom (2003-2019)
