= The Gardens Mall =

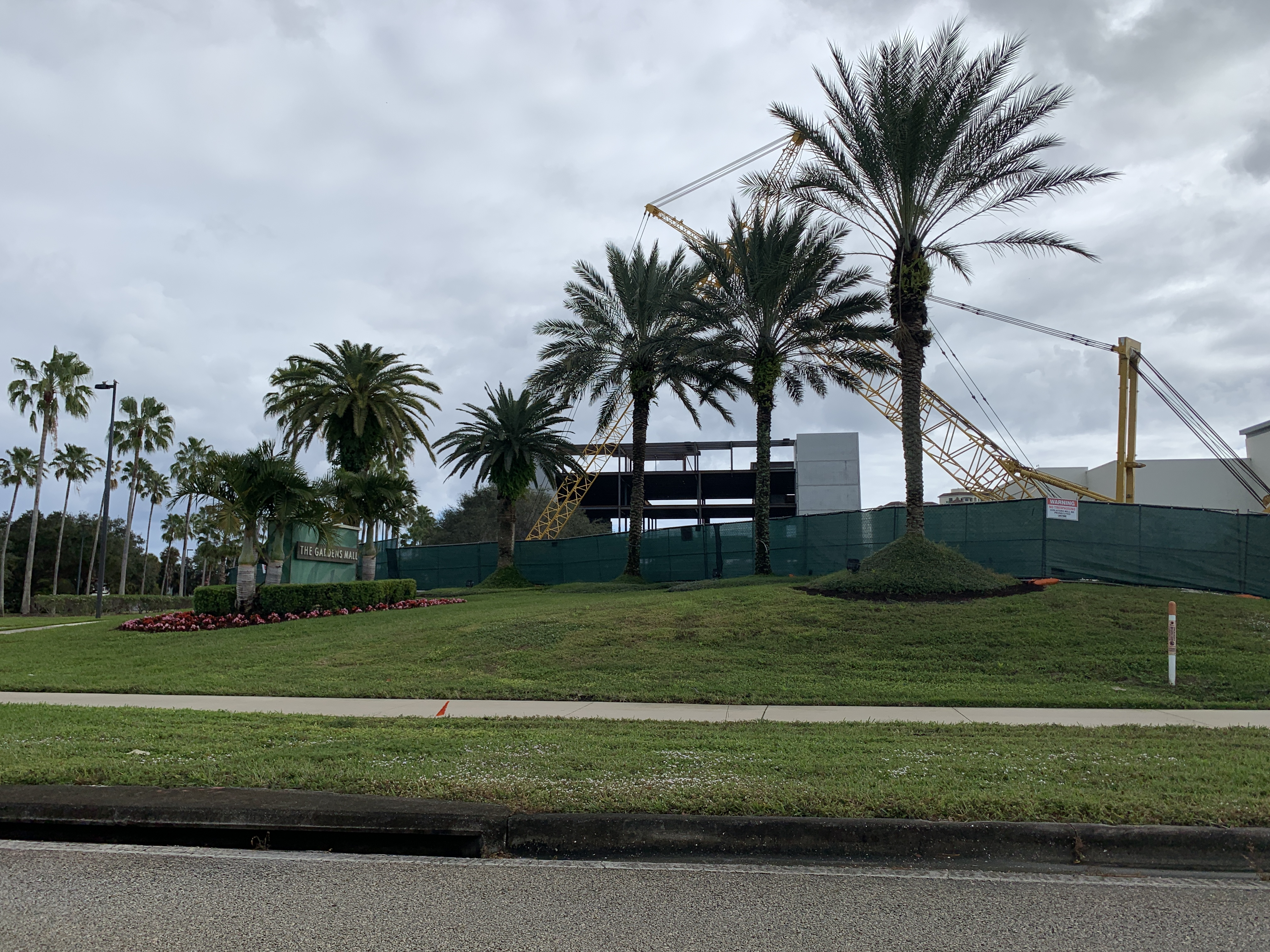
- Location: Palm Beach Gardens, Florida, United States
- Coordinates: 26.84862°N 80.08552°W
- Opened: October 5, 1988; 38 years ago
- Developer: The Forbes Company
- Owner: Forbes Cohen
- Num. of stores: 160
- Num. of anchor tenants: 5 (4 open, 1 coming soon)
- Floor area: 1.4 million square feet (130,000 m^{2})
- Floors: 2 (3 in Bloomingdale's and Macy's)
- Website: www.thegardensmall.com

The Gardens Mall is a two-story, enclosed shopping mall in Palm Beach Gardens, Florida. The mall features Macy's, Bloomingdale's, Saks Fifth Avenue, and Nordstrom. A former anchor store, Sears, closed in February 2024. Dick's Sporting Goods has attempted to operate out of the space for sometime now and eventually was able gain approval to after Sears abruptly closed down. The space is set to become a Dick's House of Sport by Spring 2028.

The mall also boasts restaurants like Brio Tuscan Grille, California Pizza Kitchen, PF Chang's China Bistro, Shake Shack, Tap 42, and Cooper's Hawk Winery and Restaurant.

== History ==
The Gardens Mall, originally called The Gardens of The Palm Beaches, was developed by The Forbes Company, based in Southfield, Michigan. On October 5, 1988, the mall opened with three initial anchor stores: Burdines, Sears and the second Macy's in Florida. Bloomingdales and Saks Fifth Avenue joined as tenants in 1990 and 1991

In 2003, Federated Department Stores (owner of both Macy's and Burdines at the time) was originally going to turn the Burdines into a Burdines-Macy's Home & Furniture and the Macy's into Burdines-Macy's Men's, Women's and Children's, but Forbes blocked plans for the Burdines since they obligated Federated to operate it as a department/specialty store, eventually, they settled, the original Macy's store was expanded by 90,000 square feet in 2006 and Burdines would shutter in 2004 and was demolished in favor of a slightly expanded wing featuring a 2-story Nordstrom joining the mall's anchor lineup, which opened to the public on March 10, 2006, Saks Fifth Avenue was also expanded by 35,000 square feet.

In October 2007, the mall underwent minor renovations. The fountain in the center was altered and the center court's garden theme was replaced with a more modern look. In April 2019, Macy's opened a Macy's Backstage store-within-a-store in the third floor.

On February 29, 2024, Sears closed permanently and abruptly without liquidation, leaving 2 Sears locations remaining in Florida.

On July 20, 2025, It was reported that Gardens Venture LLC proposed that Sears would be demolished in favor of a slightly expanded wing featuring a 2-story Dick's House of Sport (with an outdoor field) and a relocated Arhaus Furniture (which already has an existing location in the mall near the former Sears on the 2nd floor). The project gained approval on August 6, 2026, later gained final approval on September 10, 2026, and is set to open by Spring 2028, Sears is expected to be demolished.
