= Palm Tran =

Public transit bus system in Palm Beach County, Florida

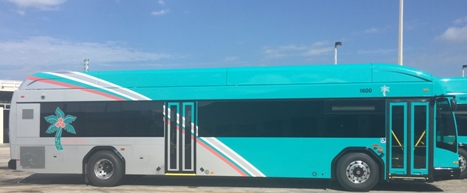
- Parent: Palm Beach County
- Founded: 1971 as (CoTran) later renamed as Palm Tran
- Headquarters: West Palm Beach, Florida
- Service type: Bus, paratransit
- Alliance: Broward County Transit, Tri-Rail, Amtrak, Martin County Transit
- Routes: 30
- Stops: 2,700
- Destinations: West Palm Beach Intermodal, VA Medical Center, Boca Town Center Mall, Wellington Mall, Tri-Rail
- Fleet: 143
- Daily ridership: 27,700 (weekdays, Q2 2026)
- Annual ridership: 9,368,600 (2025)
- Fuel type: Diesel, diesel-electric hybrid,
- Operator: Palm Tran Inc.
- Chief executive: Lyne Johnson
- Website: palmtran.org

Palm Tran is the public transit bus system run by the Palm Beach County Government, serving Palm Beach County, Florida. In 2025, the system had a ridership of 9,368,600, or about 27,700 per weekday as of the second quarter of 2026. Palm Tran also serves a portion of Broward County, Florida where it overlaps with Broward County Transit. Palm Tran has four main facilities (North Campus in West Palm Beach, South Campus in Delray Beach, Palm Tran Connection/Military Trail and the Belle Glade Facility) with its main headquarters in West Palm Beach on Electronics Way. The current executive director is Clinton B. Forbes.

== History ==
In 1971, Florida Transit Management, Inc. (a subsidiary of National City) began service with 20 buses on seven routes. In 1980, this service was expanded to over 60 buses in 22 routes, then renamed CoTran, short for "County Transportation". Finally, in 1996, CoTran was completely restructured to over 150 buses in over 30 routes, then renamed Palm Tran, its fleet repainted to the present white and teal design scheme, and has been that way since. At that time the basic design of the livery of the buses was changed from white and orange to white and teal, some of which are screen-wrapped to the logos and design of the company that sponsors those particular buses, but preserve their Palm Tran logos and bus numbers, the latter of which are assigned a four-digit number according to the year and order in which they were acquired. Also at that time, Florida Transit Management was replaced with Palm Tran Inc., a nonprofit. Palm Tran will introduce USB charging stations on its newest fleet in early 2017.

On September 30, 2018, Palm Tran implemented the first overhaul to the entire network since 1996. In addition, free Wi-Fi was added on all buses.

== Future ==
On April 23, 2019, The Palm Tran broke ground on an expansion project on its South County Facility in Delray Beach, Florida. The current 3,800 Square foot space will be converted into a three-story 34,000 square foot facility. The project is set to cost 25 million, 90 percent of which is federally funded. The facility will feature charging stations for their fleet of fully electric buses; along with service stations for 20 additional buses. The building will feature art by Palm Beach County's Art in Public Places Program.

== Rates ==
Plexiglass shields on the driver's side are in place, to reduce interaction.

The standard adult one-way fare is $2. People eligible for the reduced fare, such as students, disabled, and senior citizens, pay $1. $5 buys an unlimited 24-hour pass ($3.50 for reduced fare). Daily and 31-day unlimited ride passes are also available for purchase at Palm Tran Connection. There are 31-day unlimited passes that are available reduced or regular costing $55 and $70 respectively. Kids below 9 ride free with fare-paying rider, limit is 3.

== Bus technology ==
All Palm Tran buses have bicycle racks on the front, capable of holding two bikes. They are also equipped GPS and video surveillance cameras which record activity on the bus and the outer side facing the bus stops. Recently Palm Tran has equipped all fixed-route buses with automatic vehicle location technology that enables passengers to track buses and bus arrivals in real time. Palm Tran also offers real-time bus arrival information on its website or through its MyStop Mobile app, as well as on-demand through SMS. In October 2018, all 159 fixed route buses started to offer free Wi-Fi to its riders.

Palm Tran announced plans to incorporate new payment methods in addition to cash. The new upgrades will allow the service to accept credit cards and smartphone payments. The upgrade was set to cost between 5 million and 6 million dollars.

== Palm Tran Connection ==
Palm Tran Connection is a shared ride, door to door, paratransit service that provides transportation for residents and visitors in Palm Beach County under six programs:

- Americans with Disabilities Act (ADA) Program
- Transportation Disadvantaged (TD) Program
- Division of Senior Services (DOSS) Program

Palm Tran Connection is operated by private transport companies and oversight is provided through Palm Tran. They travel to every destination in Palm Beach County – from Jupiter to Boca Raton and from Palm Beach to South Bay. Palm Tran Connection schedules all trips, prepares vehicle manifests, handles customer concerns & commendations, determines eligibility, and monitors the performance of the Transportation Providers. The fare for ADA and TD is $3.50 per one way. DOSS is free to meal sites.

== Route list ==
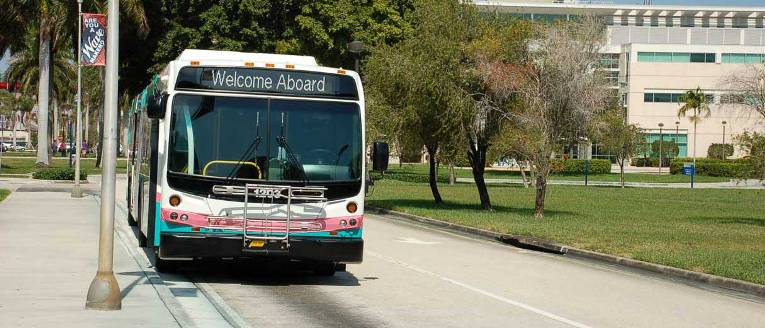
A PalmTran bus at Florida Atlantic University

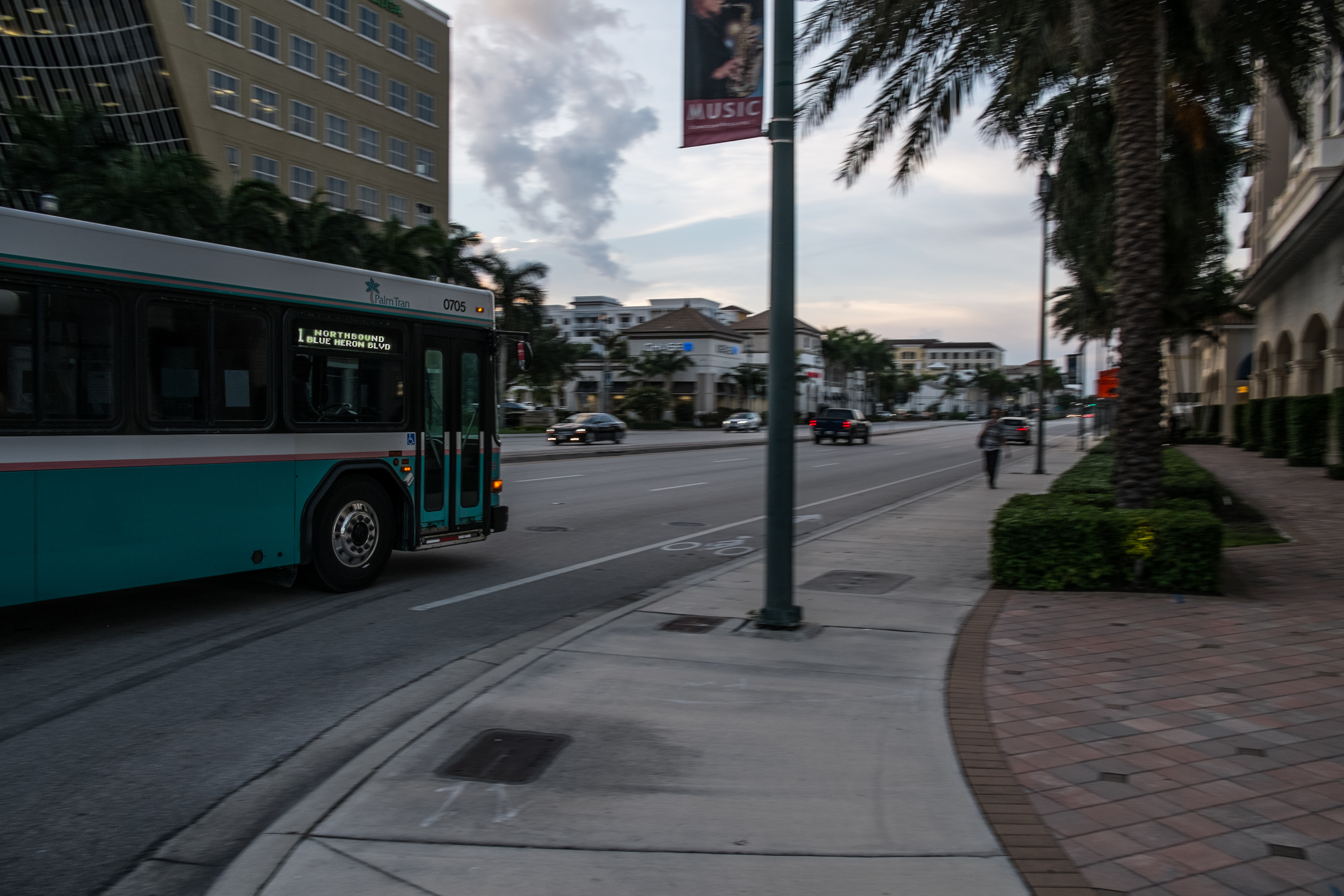
A PalmTran bus along US 1 in Boca Raton.

Routes are divided into four regions within the county.

=== Main Corridor ===
Main Corridor routes traverse the primary north–south surface roads of the county from Boca Raton in the south to Riviera Beach in the north.

Route	Terminals			Primary streets traveled	Service notes
1	Palm Beach Gardens; The Gardens Mall	↔	Boca Raton; Camino Real	US 1	
2	West Palm Beach; Intermodal Transit Center	↔	Boca Raton; Town Center Mall	Congress Avenue	
3	Palm Beach Gardens; The Gardens Mall	↔	Boca Raton; Town Center Mall	Military Trail	
4	West Palm Beach; Military Crossing	↔	Riviera Beach; VA Medical Center	Haverhill Road	

=== North County ===
North County routes mainly serve Palm Beach Gardens, Riviera Beach, and Jupiter.

Route	Terminals			Primary streets traveled	Service notes
10	Palm Beach Gardens; The Gardens Mall	↔	Jupiter; Jupiter Town Hall	Indiantown Road, Military Trail	No Sunday service
20	Palm Beach Gardens; The Gardens Mall	↔	West Palm Beach; Intermodal Transit Center	Northlake Boulevard, Congress Avenue	
30	Riviera Beach; VA Medical Center	↔	Singer Island; Lake Drive	Blue Heron Boulevard	
31	Riviera Beach; VA Medical Center	↔	West Palm Beach; Intermodal Transit Center	45th Street, Tamarind Avenue	
33	Palm Beach Gardens; The Gardens Mall	↔	West Palm Beach; Cross County Plaza	Australian Avenue, Palm Beach Lakes Boulevard	

=== Central County ===
Central County routes serve West Palm Beach, Wellington, Lake Worth, and Belle Glade.

Route	Terminals			Primary streets traveled	Service notes
40	Belle Glade; West Tech Education Center	↔	Wellington; Mall at Wellington Green	Southern Boulevard	
40	Belle Glade; West Tech Education Center	↔	West Palm Beach; Intermodal Transit Center	Southern Boulevard, Australian Avenue	Rush hour service only
41	Palm Beach; Palm Beach Inlet	↔	West Palm Beach; Intermodal Transit Center	North County Road	No Sunday service
43	Wellington; Mall at Wellington Green	↔	West Palm Beach; Intermodal Transit Center	Okeechobee Boulevard	
44	West Palm Beach; Vista Center	↔	West Palm Beach; Intermodal Transit Center	Belvedere Road, Cherry Road	
46	Wellington; Mall at Wellington Green	↔	West Palm Beach; Palm Coast Plaza	Forest Hill Boulevard	
47	Canal Point; Community Center	↔	South Bay; Second Street	SR 15, SR 715	
60	Greenacres; River Bridge Centre	↔	West Palm Beach; Intermodal Transit Center	Purdy Lane, Summit Boulevard, Parker Avenue	No Sunday service
61	Greenacres; River Bridge Centre	↔	Lake Worth; Palm Beach State College	Cresthaven Boulevard, 10th Avenue North	
62	Wellington; Mall at Wellington Green	↔	Lake Worth; Lake Worth Beach	Lake Worth Road	
63	West Palm Beach; Vista Center	↔	Lantana; Hypoluxo Road & US 1	Jog Road, Lantana Road	
64	Greenacres; WIC Center	↔	Lantana; County Public Health	Melaleuca Lane, 6th Avenue South	No Sunday service

=== South County ===
South County routes mainly serve the cities of Boynton Beach, Delray Beach, and Boca Raton.

Route	Terminals			Primary streets traveled	Service notes
70	Lantana; County Public Health	↔	Delray Beach; Tri-Rail Station	Seacrest Boulevard	
71	Boynton Beach; Lantana Road & Military Trail	↔	Boynton Beach; Boynton Beach Mall	Lawrence Road	No Sunday service
73	Boynton Beach; Bethesda Hospital West	↔	Boynton Beach; Tri-Rail Station	Boynton Beach Boulevard	
80	Delray Beach; Delray Square	↔	Delray Beach; Plaza at Delary	Lake Ida Road, SW 4th Avenue	
81	Delray Beach; Hagen Ranch Library	↔	Delray Beach; Atlantic Avenue & SE 6th Street	Atlantic Avenue	No Sunday service
88	Delray Beach; Lakes of Delray	↔	Delray Beach; Plaza at Delray	Linton Boulevard, Lowson Boulevard	
91	Boca Raton; Sandalfoot Square	↔	Boca Raton; Florida Atlantic University	Glades Road	
92	Boca Raton; Sandalfoot Square	↔	Boca Raton; Camino Real & Federal Highway	Palmetto Park Road	No Sunday service
94	Boca Raton; Tri-Rail Station	↔	Boca Raton; Camino Real & Federal Highway	NW 8th Avenue, NE 20th Street	Serves Florida Atlantic University

== See also ==
- Transportation in South Florida
