= Mangonia Park station =

Railway station in Mangonia Park, Florida

Mangonia Park

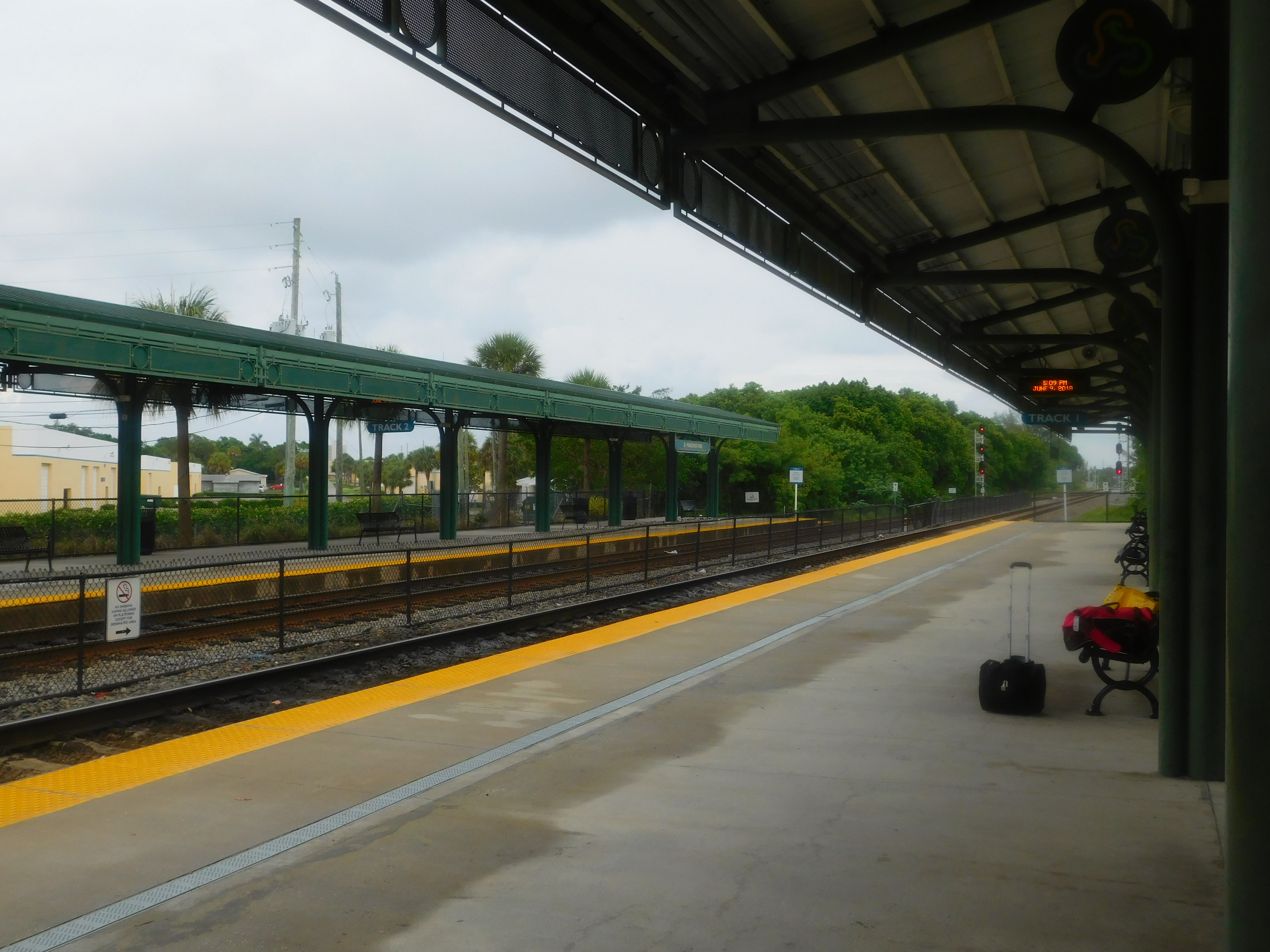
- Mangonia Park station in June 2018

General information
- Location: 1415 45th Street; Mangonia Park, Florida
- Coordinates: 26.758383°N 80.076459°W
- Owner: South Florida Regional Transportation Authority
- Line: South Florida Rail Corridor
- Platforms: 2 side platforms
- Tracks: 2
- Connections: Palm Tran: 20, 31, 33

Construction
- Structure type: At-grade
- Parking: 273 spaces
- Cycle facilities: Yes
- Accessible: Yes

Other information
- Fare zone: Mangonia Park–Lake Worth Beach

History
- Opened: October 28, 1996

Services
| Preceding station | Tri-Rail | Following station |
|---|---|---|
| West Palm Beach toward Miami Airport | Main Line | Terminus |
Future services
| Preceding station | Tri-Rail | Following station |
|---|---|---|
| West Palm Beach toward Downtown Miami | Red Line (proposed) | Terminus |
Location

Mangonia Park is a Tri-Rail commuter rail station in Mangonia Park, Florida. This is the system's northernmost station. The station is located on 45th Street (CR 702), just west of Australian Avenue (CR 704A). There are 273 parking spaces at the station.

== History ==
The Mangonia Park station was opened on October 28, 1996, along a former Seaboard Air Line Railroad line, and was the first station to serve the community.

Every January, Palm Beach County Public School safety patrol boards charter an Amtrak train at the station for their annual trip to Washington, D.C. The train operates with a Silver Meteor consist plus several Horizon coaches. On the days this train operates, the northbound or southbound Silver Meteors are actually canceled since the train uses the equipment that would normally be used for those runs. This is the only time an Amtrak operated train stops at this station.

== Station layout ==
Mangonia Park is served by routes 20, 31, and 33 of Palm Tran, the county bus system. These buses serve The Gardens Mall, Downtown West Palm Beach, the VA Medical Center, and Cross County Plaza. The station has two side platforms, with buses and parking adjacent to the Track 1 platform.
