= MiamiCentral =

Brightline and Tri-Rail train station

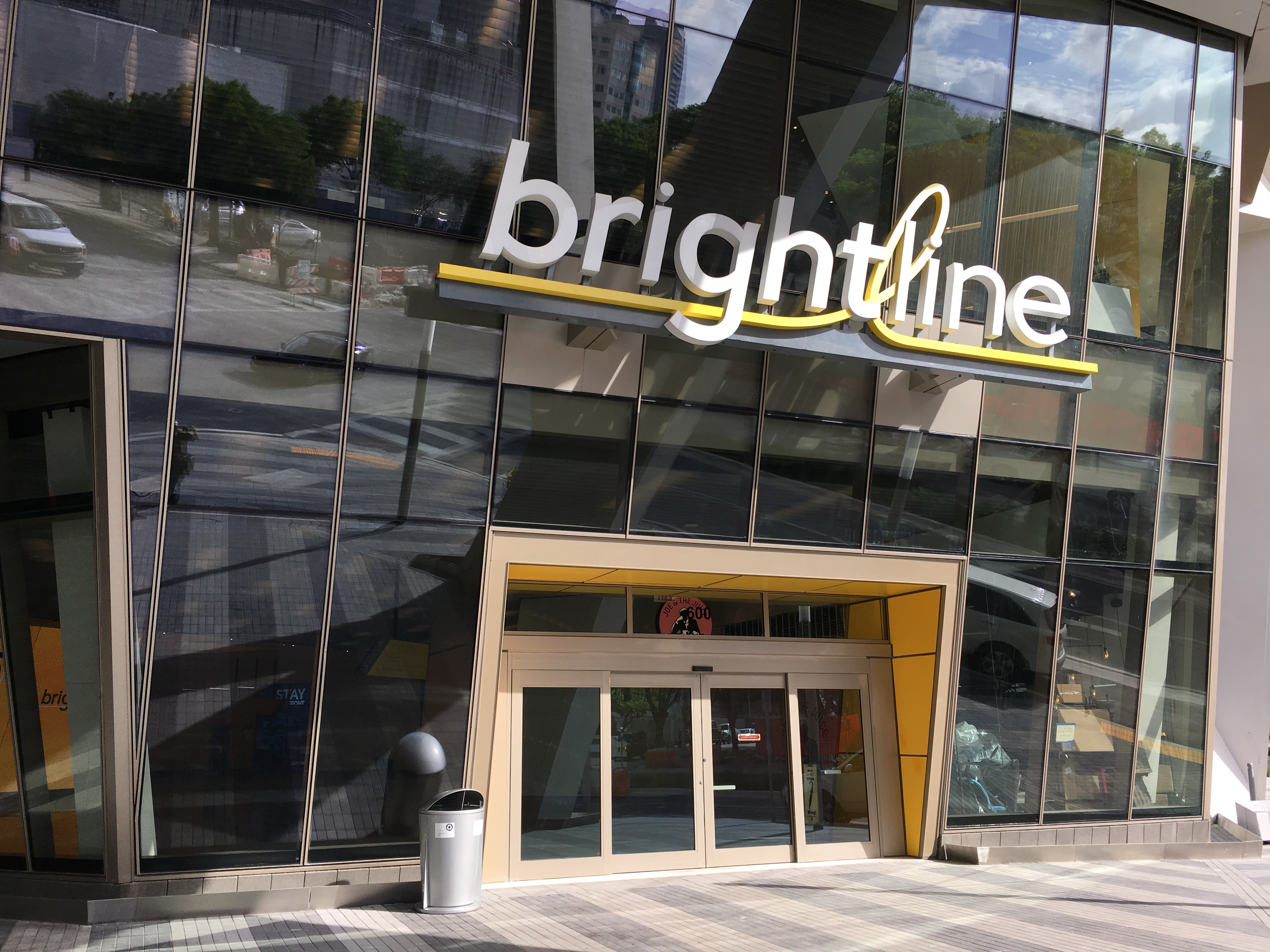
- The entrance to MiamiCentral

General information
- Location: 600 NW 1st Avenue; Miami, Florida; United States
- Coordinates: 25°46′39″N 80°11′45″W
- Owner: Florida East Coast Industries
- Platforms: 1 high-level island platform; 1 high-level side platform; 2 low-level side platforms
- Tracks: 5
- Connections: Metrorail (at Government Center and Historic Overtown/Lyric Theatre); Metromover (at Government Center and Wilkie D. Ferguson Jr.); Metrobus: 2, 3, 7, 7A, 9, 11, 21, 77, 95, 95A, 95B, 100, 101, 203, 207, 208, 211, 400, 401, 836, 837; Broward County Transit: 109, 110; Miami Trolley: Coral Way

Construction
- Structure type: Elevated
- Parking: Yes, paid
- Cycle facilities: Racks, Citi Bike station
- Accessible: Yes
- Architect: Skidmore, Owings & Merrill, Zyscovich Architects, TLC Engineering for Architecture
- Architectural style: Modernism

Other information
- Fare zone: Miami–Golden Glades (Tri-Rail)

History
- Opened: April 15, 1896
- Closed: January 23, 1963
- Rebuilt: May 19, 2018

Services
Preceding station	Brightline	Following station
Aventura toward Orlando	Brightline	Terminus
Preceding station	Tri-Rail	Following station
Metrorail Transfer Terminus	Shuttle	Terminus
Metrorail Transfer toward West Palm Beach	Express	Terminus
Former services
Preceding station	Florida East Coast Railway	Following station
Terminus	Main Line	Little River toward Jacksonville
Future services
Preceding station	Tri-Rail	Following station
TBD
Terminus	Red Line (proposed)	Midtown/Design District toward Mangonia Park
Route map
Location

MiamiCentral is a train station in Miami, Florida. Located in Downtown Miami, the station provides access to the Brightline inter-city rail service and the Tri-Rail commuter rail service. The station is part of a 9-acre (3.6 ha) mixed-use complex, which includes 3 million square feet (280,000 m^{2}) of residential, office, commercial, and retail development.

Government Center station, providing both Metromover and Metrorail service, is directly connected to the south end of MiamiCentral via a pedestrian bridge over NW 3rd Street. The Wilkie D. Ferguson Jr. Metromover station and the Historic Overtown/Lyric Theatre Metrorail station are within steps of the northern entrances to MiamiCentral. The station was built by All Aboard Florida, a subsidiary of Florida East Coast Industries (FECI) overseeing Brightline, and designed by Skidmore, Owings & Merrill in association with Zyscovich Architects.

== History ==
=== Original FEC station: 1896–1963 ===
MiamiCentral was originally a railroad station opened April 15, 1896 as the southern terminus of Henry Flagler's Florida East Coast Railway (FEC). The station was the southern end of the FEC line until 1905, when construction began to Key West via the Overseas Railroad. The FEC built a wooden passenger station building in 1912 at site of what would become the Dade County Courthouse. Construction on the courthouse was started in 1925 and finished 1928. FEC regularly serviced the site until January 23, 1963, when union workers for both companies went on strike.

At the insistence of the City of Miami, which had long fought to get rid of the tracks in the downtown section just north of the county courthouse, the downtown passenger terminal was demolished by November 1963. Although a new station was planned at the Buena Vista yard near North Miami Avenue and 36th Street (US 27), it was never built. The site of the old station was left as parking lots until construction of MiamiCentral began in 2014.

When FEC ended their passenger service, this left Seaboard Coast Line Railroad (service absorbed by Amtrak in 1971) as the sole inter-city rail in Miami. They operated out of the decaying Allapattah terminal at Northwest 22nd Street and Seventh Avenue (US 441) until in 1978 Amtrak moved to its current location near Hialeah.

=== New station ===
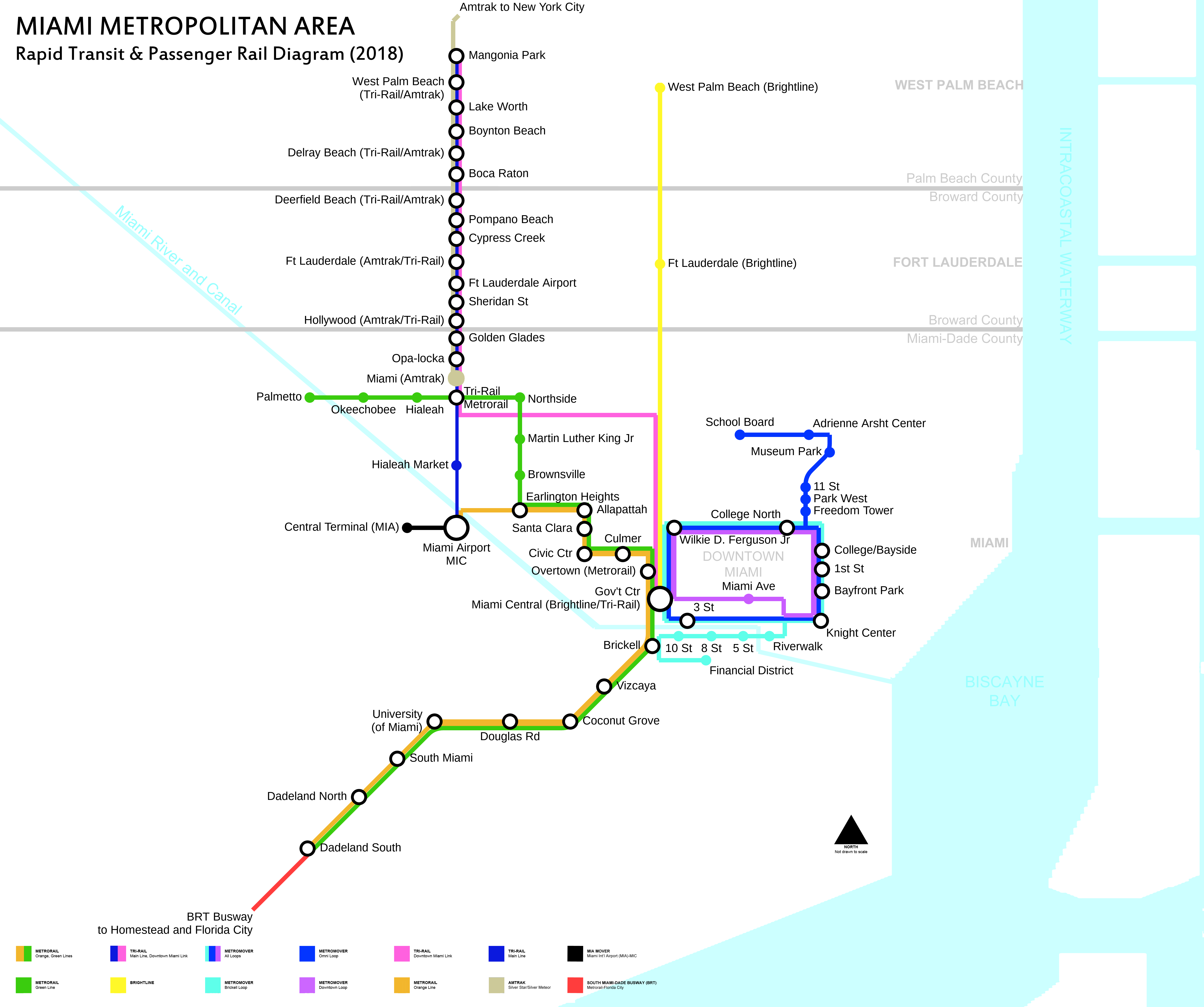
Schematic of rapid transit and passenger rail service in the Miami metropolitan area in 2017. The Tri-Rail Downtown Miami Link became operational on January 13, 2024.

In March 2012, All Aboard Florida, a former subsidiary of Florida East Coast Industries that also at the time owned the Florida East Coast Railway, announced plans to connect Miami and Orlando with higher-speed passenger rail service. In May 2014, All Aboard Florida unveiled their plans for the 9-acre (3.6 ha) site, with construction anticipated to begin in late 2014. The company planned to build two tracks on either side of an island platform 50 feet (15 m) above street level and 3 million square feet (280,000 m^{2}) of transit-oriented development, with retail shops at street level and hotel rooms, housing and office space occupying towers above the station.

In August 2014, preparatory work began with the removal of parking lots that had previously been located on the site. Construction of the facility began in mid 2015, when subterranean support pilings began to be built, and by the end of the year foundation and frame construction was underway. By October 2016, construction of the rail facility was about 70% complete, while work on the lower structure of the office and residential buildings had begun. When Brightline began revenue operations in January 2018 between West Palm Beach and Fort Lauderdale, MiamiCentral was still incomplete. Service to Miami was planned to begin at the end of April 2018. Brightline service to MiamiCentral commenced on May 19, 2018.

In its final design, MiamiCentral includes a 50,000-square-foot (4,600 m^{2}) dining and grocery marketplace dubbed Central Fare, 130,000 square feet (12,000 m^{2}) of retail space, one residential building with 800 apartments, and two office buildings. It will have five tracks, with three serving Brightline trains and two serving Tri-Rail trains. The office buildings are 3 MiamiCentral (12 stories, 96,000 sq ft (8,900 m^{2})) and 2 MiamiCentral (190,000 square feet (18,000 m^{2}))

The Tri-Rail commuter service invested about $70 million at the station for the "Tri-Rail Downtown Miami Link" project, which allows Tri-Rail to operate into the station. Service began on January 13, 2024, with a ribbon-cutting ceremony held the previous day. MiamiCentral is additionally planned to be the southern terminus of the Northeast Corridor Rapid Transit Project commuter rail line.

== Station layout ==
Tracks 1–3, as well as Platforms A-C, are for Brightline service to Orlando. Tracks 4 and 5, along with Platforms D and E, opened in conjunction with Tri-Rail's Downtown Miami Link service.

== Gallery ==
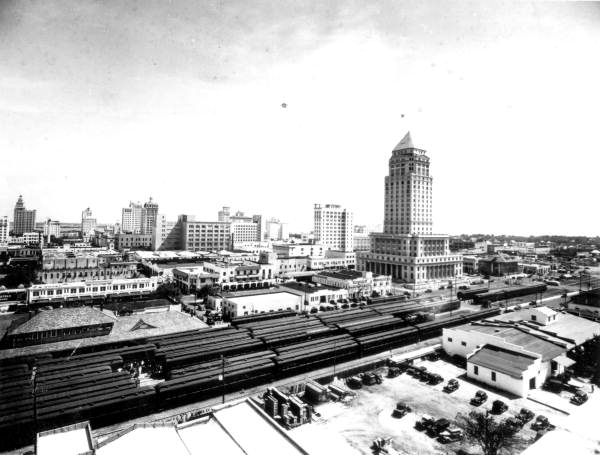
View toward the southeast of the city center, with passenger trains and the Dade County Courthouse foreground, c. 1930s

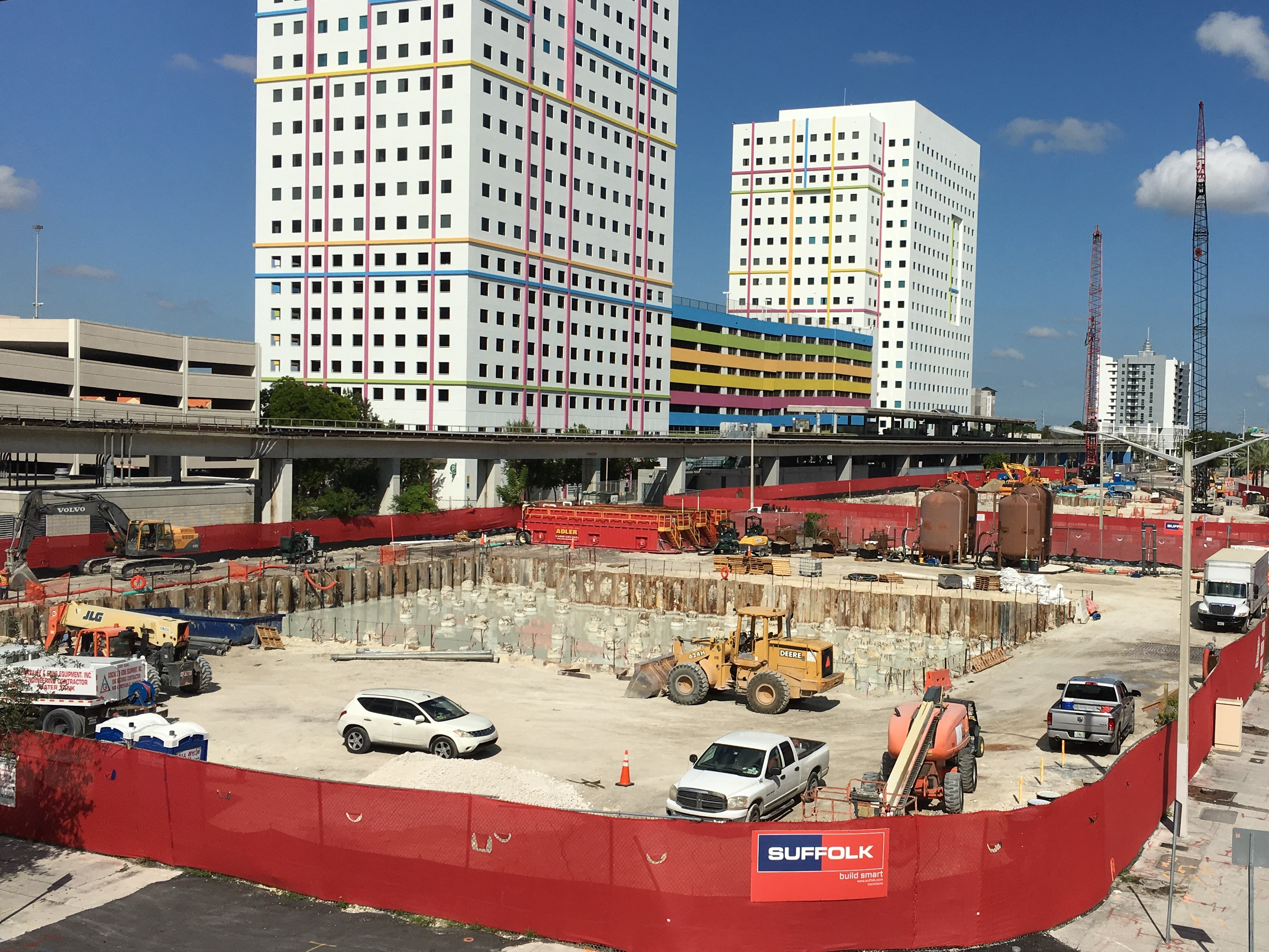
November 2015

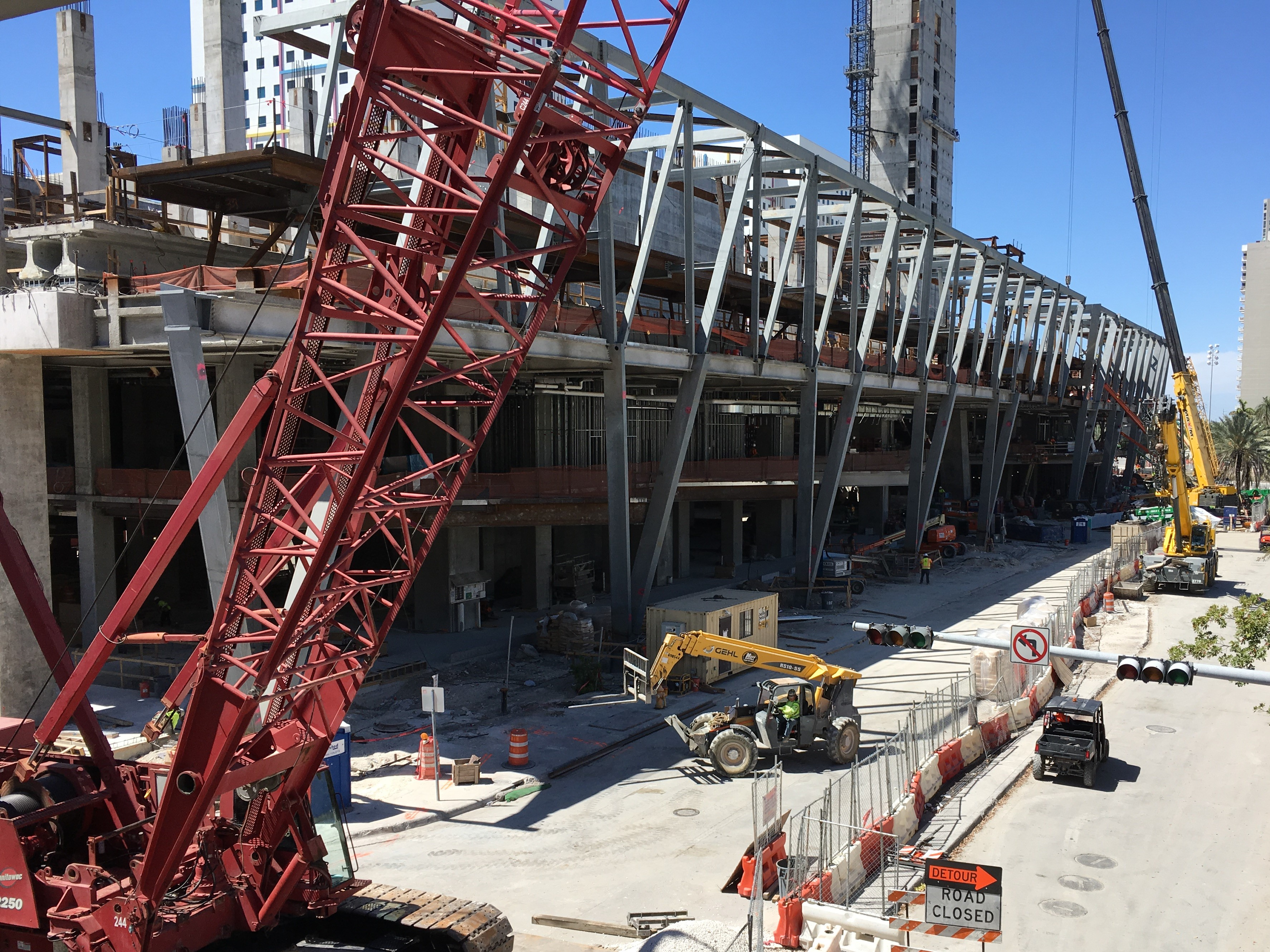
April 2017

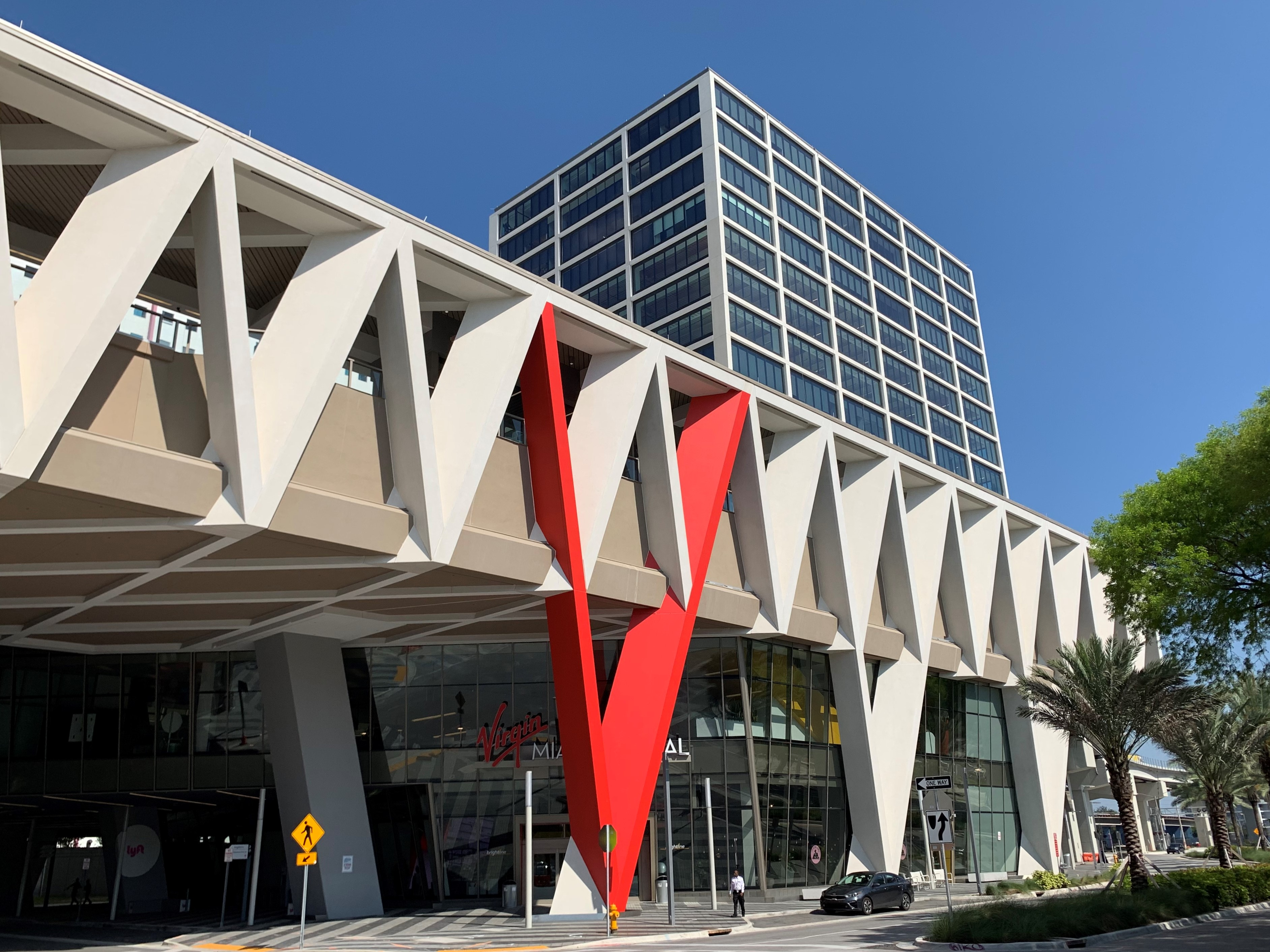
May 2019

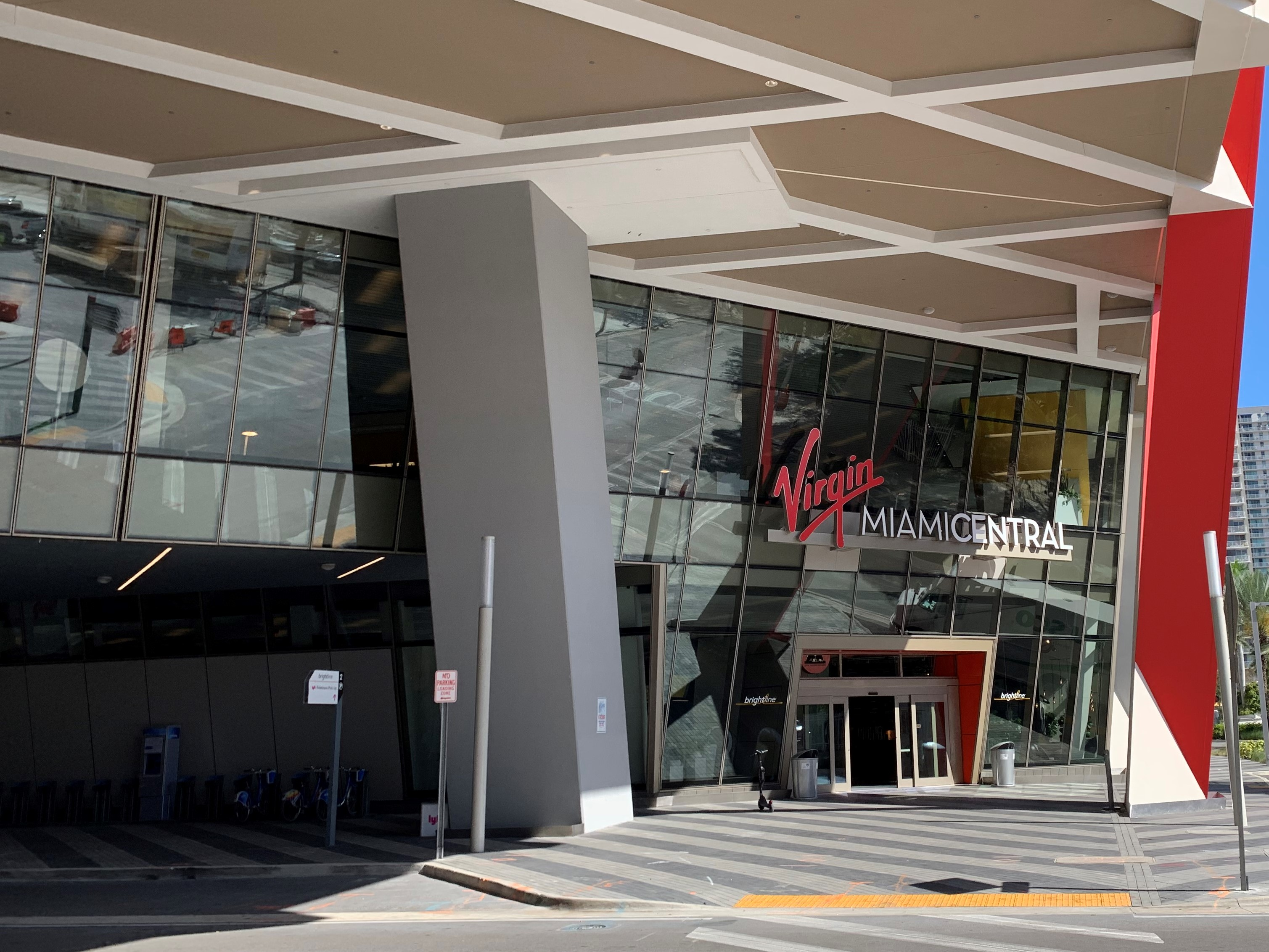
MiamiCentral station entrance, when it was branded under Virgin Trains USA

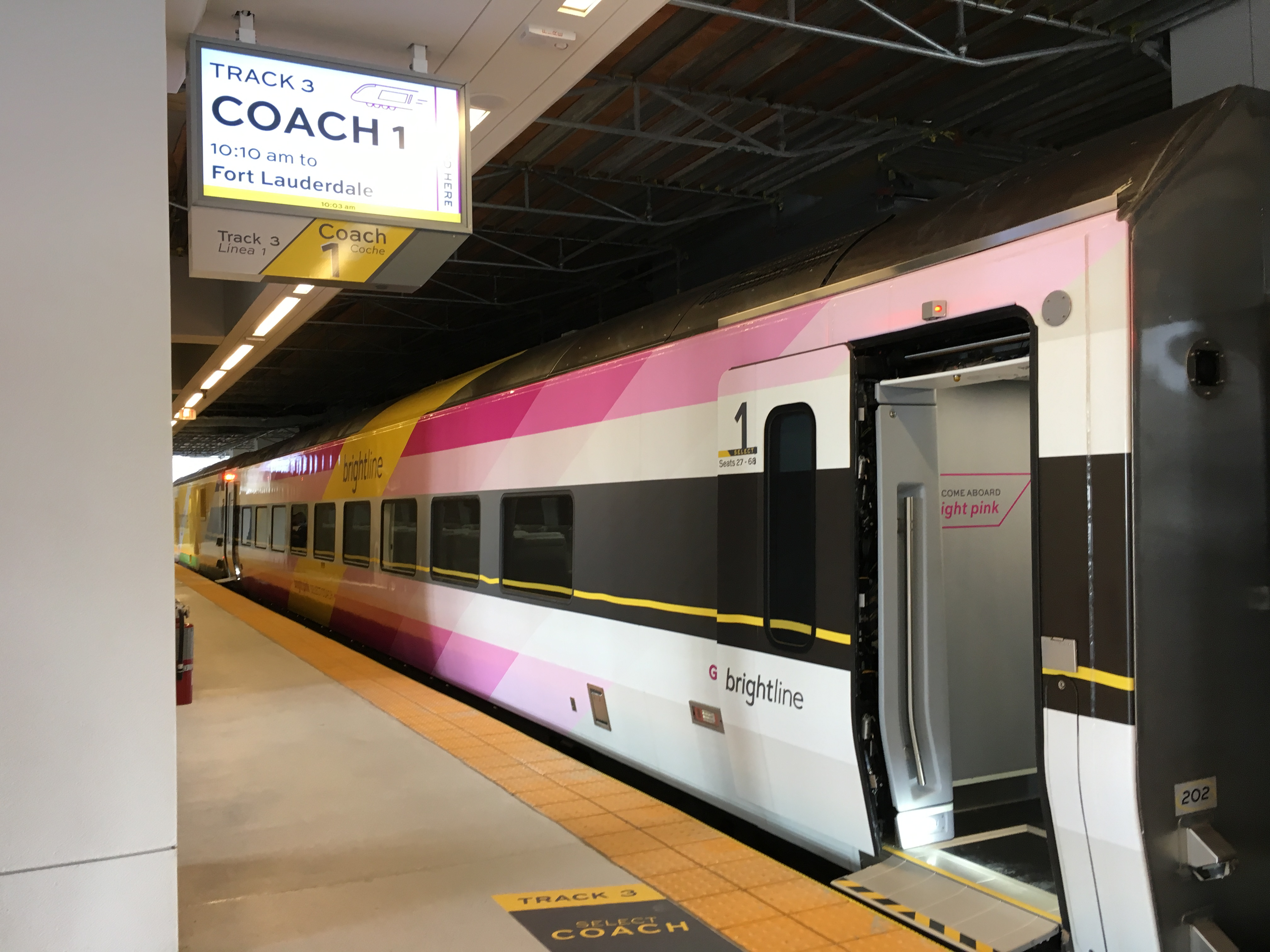
Brightline train at the station

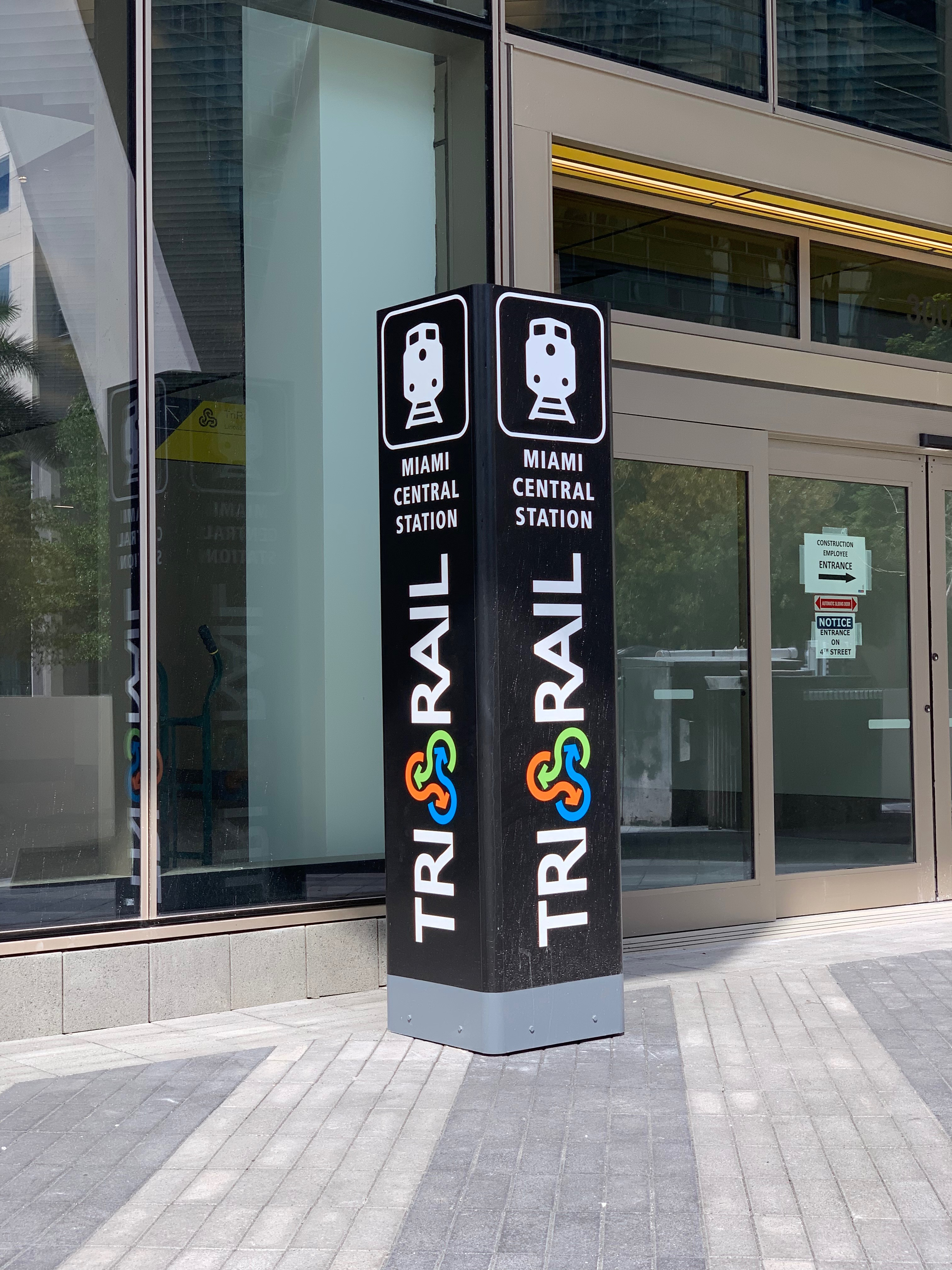
Tri-Rail sign outside of the station

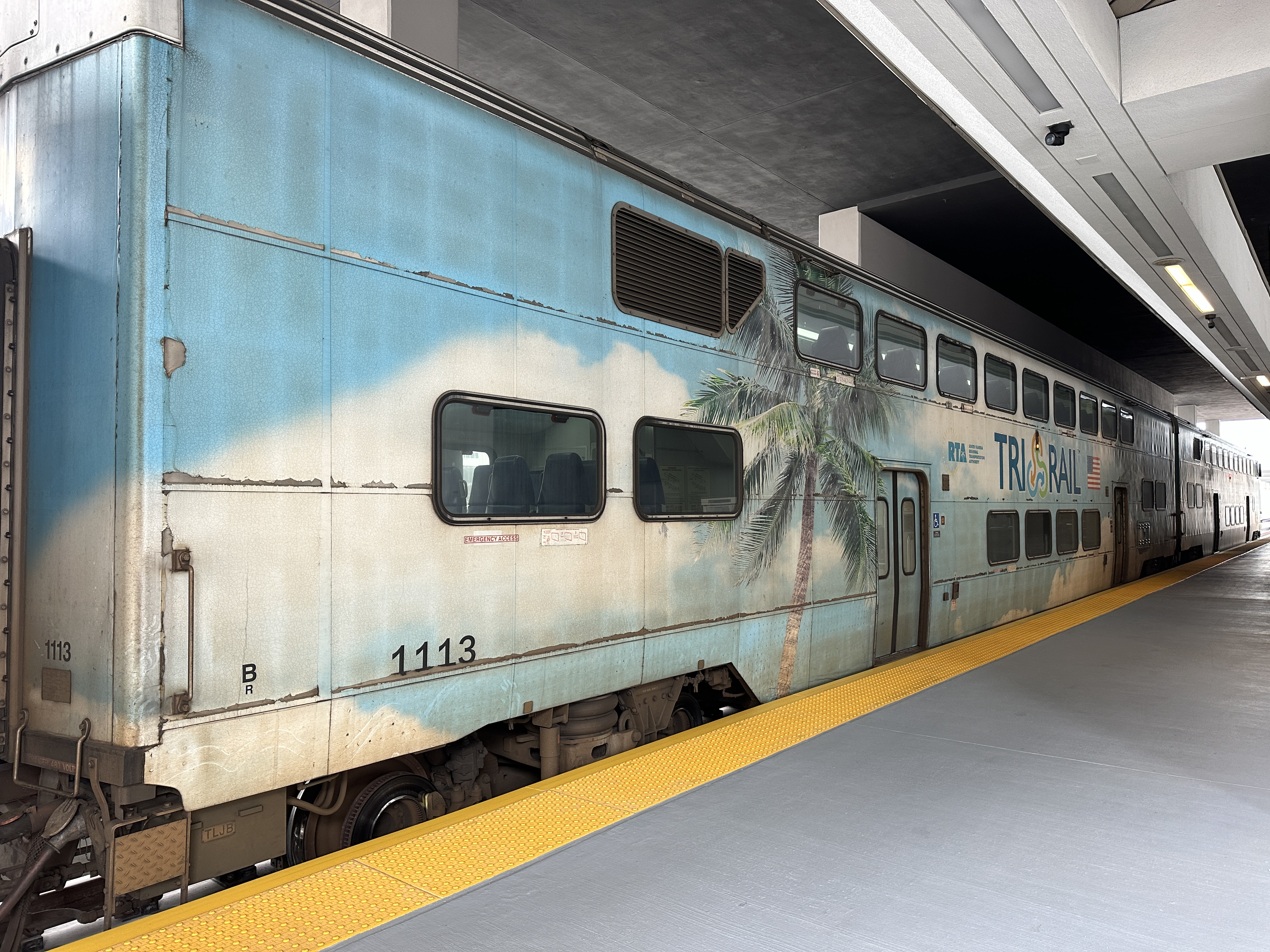
Tri-Rail train at the station

== See also ==
- Transportation in South Florida
