= South Florida Regional Transportation Authority =

Overview
- Locale: Miami metropolitan area, Florida, U.S.
- Transit type: Commuter rail
- Website: www.sfrta.fl.gov

Operation
- Began operation: July 1, 2003; 23 years ago
- Operators: South Florida Regional Transportation Authority (in cooperation with Miami-Dade Transit, Broward County Transit, and Palm Tran)

Technical
- System length: 81.64 mi (131.4 km)
- Track gauge: 1,435 mm (4 ft 8 1/2 in) (standard gauge)

South Florida Regional Transportation Authority (SFRTA), based in Pompano Beach, Florida, provides public transport services in Miami-Dade, Broward, and Palm Beach Counties. The organization was created on July 1, 2003, by the Florida Legislature and enacted by the Florida Department of Transportation. Replacing the pre-existing Tri-County Commuter Rail Authority, the goal of incorporation was to expand cooperation between the Tri-Rail commuter rail service and the existing county public transport authorities: Broward County Transit, Miami-Dade Transit, and Palm Tran. Tri-Rail is solely operated by the SFRTA.

== History ==
SFRTA's mission statement is; "To coordinate, develop and implement, in cooperation with all appropriate levels of government, private enterprise and citizens at-large in the community, a viable regional transportation system in South Florida that endeavors to meet the desires and needs for the movement of people, goods and services."

In November 2011, the Federal Transit Administration (FTA), through its TIGGER III Program, awarded $5.7 million to the SFRTA for its sustainable stations project. The project involves installation of solar panels at a station that will provide 100% of the station's energy, while sending excess energy to the main power grid and store daytime energy for lighting needs at night.

== Board Members ==
- Steven C. Braun
- Albert J. Cacace
- J.C. De Ona
- Lamar P. Fisher
- Carlos A. Penin
- Raquel A. Regalado (Vice Chair)
- James A. Scott
- Hal R. Valeche
- Robert C. L. Vaughan
- Marci Woodward (Chair)

== See also ==
- Tri-Rail; commuter rail line operated by South Florida Regional Transportation Authority linking Miami, Fort Lauderdale, and West Palm Beach, Florida.
- Transportation in South Florida; general coverage of regional transportation.
