= Gustav Maass (architect) =

American architect

Gustav A. Maass Jr.
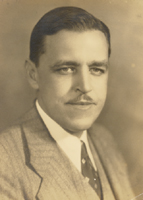
- Born: 1893; New Orleans, Louisiana, US
- Died: 1964 (aged 70–71)
- Occupation: Architect
- Buildings: Palm Beach Town Hall; Deerfield Beach Seaboard Air Line Railway Station; Delray Beach Seaboard Air Line Railway Station; Hialeah Seaboard Air Line Railway Station; Homestead Seaboard Air Line Railway Station; Naples Seaboard Air Line Railway Station

Gustav Adam Maass Jr. (1893–1964) was an American architect working primarily in the Mediterranean Revival style who designed public buildings and private homes in and around Palm Beach, Florida, from the 1920s until his death in 1964.

== Early life and education ==
Gustav Maass was born in New Orleans, the third of eight children of German immigrants. His father, Gustav A. Maass (1858 - 1927), was a mechanical engineer, his mother, Margaret Oelschlegel Maass (1864 - 1943), was also a mechanical engineer. Maass grew up in New Orleans and Birmingham, Alabama. He received a degree in architecture from the University of Pennsylvania in 1917 and worked during World War I in the U.S. Civil Service at League Island Navy Yard in Philadelphia. After the war, Maass returned to Birmingham, where he designed a variety of structures, including a Masonic Temple, power plants, schools, churches, and houses.

== Palm Beach ==
In 1921, Maass joined Harvey and Clarke in West Palm Beach, where he participated in the design of many buildings in Delray Beach in the 1920s; his Art Deco style was reflected in commercial buildings along Atlantic Avenue. Maass was responsible for the design of several railroad stations on Florida's east and west coasts, including

- Deerfield Beach Seaboard station, 1300 West Hillsboro Boulevard, Deerfield Beach, Florida (1927), NRHP-listed
- Delray Beach Seaboard Air Line Railway Station (1927), NRHP-listed
- Fort Lauderdale station (1927)
- Homestead Seaboard station (1927)
- Hollywood station (Florida) (1928)

Maass was partners with John L. Volk from 1927 to 1935 in Palm Beach, when he started his own firm. He designed the American Red Cross building in West Palm Beach and the original Rehabilitation Center for Children and Adults facility in Palm Beach and he also redesigned the interior of the First Presbyterian Church, West Palm Beach.

The Palm Beach Town Council has designated several Maass-designed houses as landmarks to be preserved, many of which were in the Mediterranean Revival style featuring simple windows, barrel clay tile roofs, and stucco exteriors. Maass also used Neo-Classical and Colonial Revival styles.

== See also ==
- Mediterranean Revival
- Palm Beach, Florida

== Gallery ==
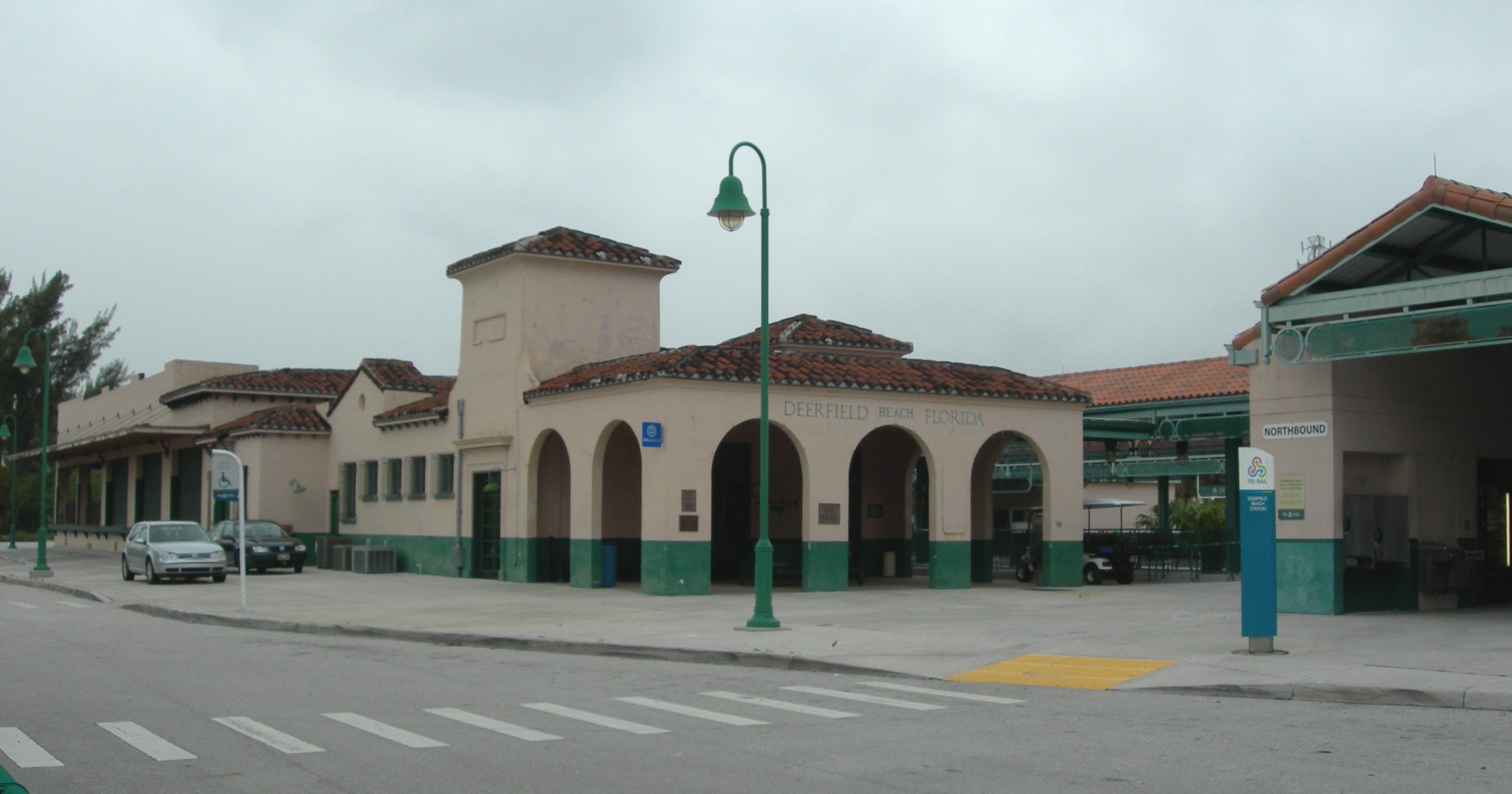
Deerfield Beach Station

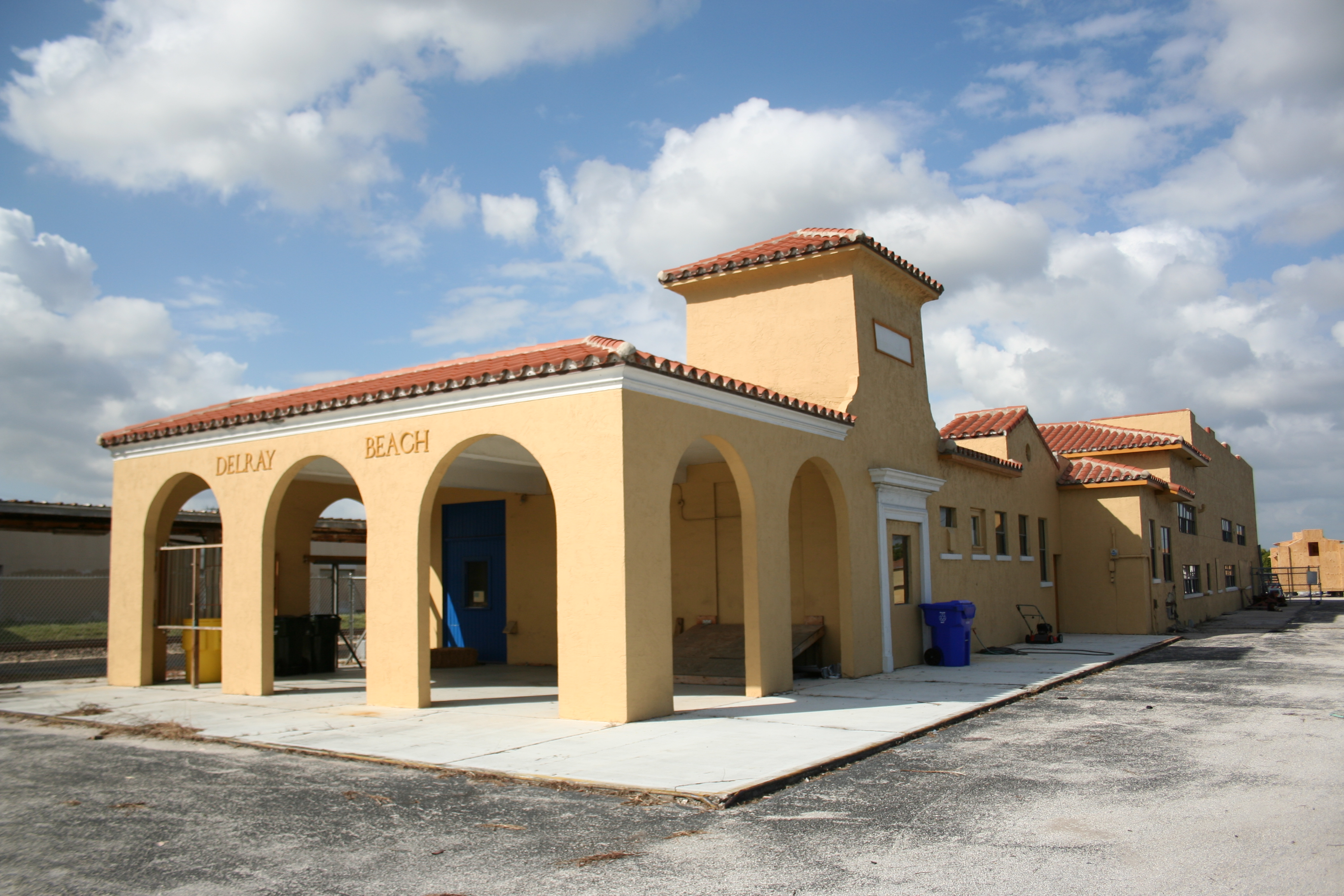
Delray Beach Station

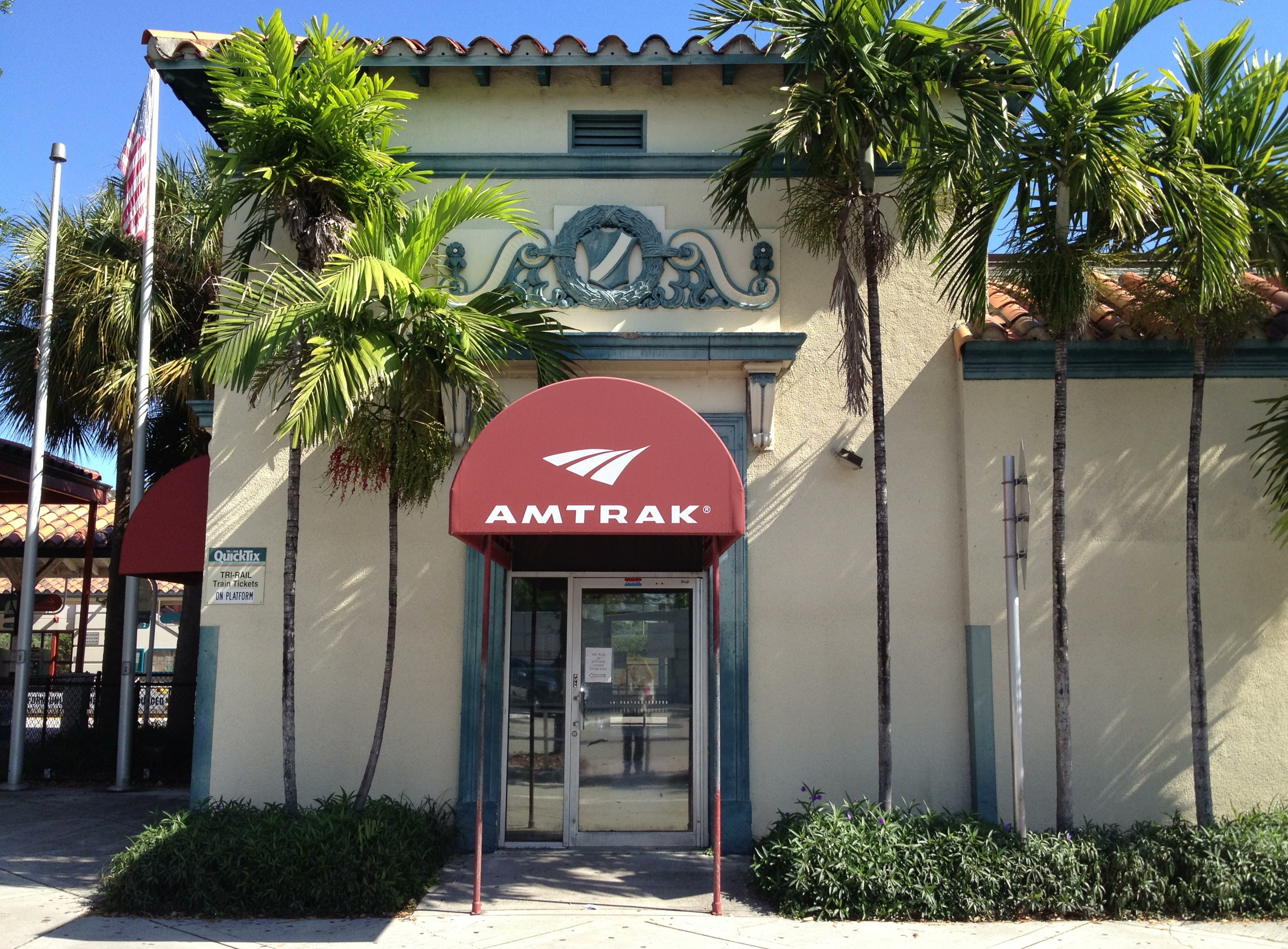
Ft. Lauderdale Station

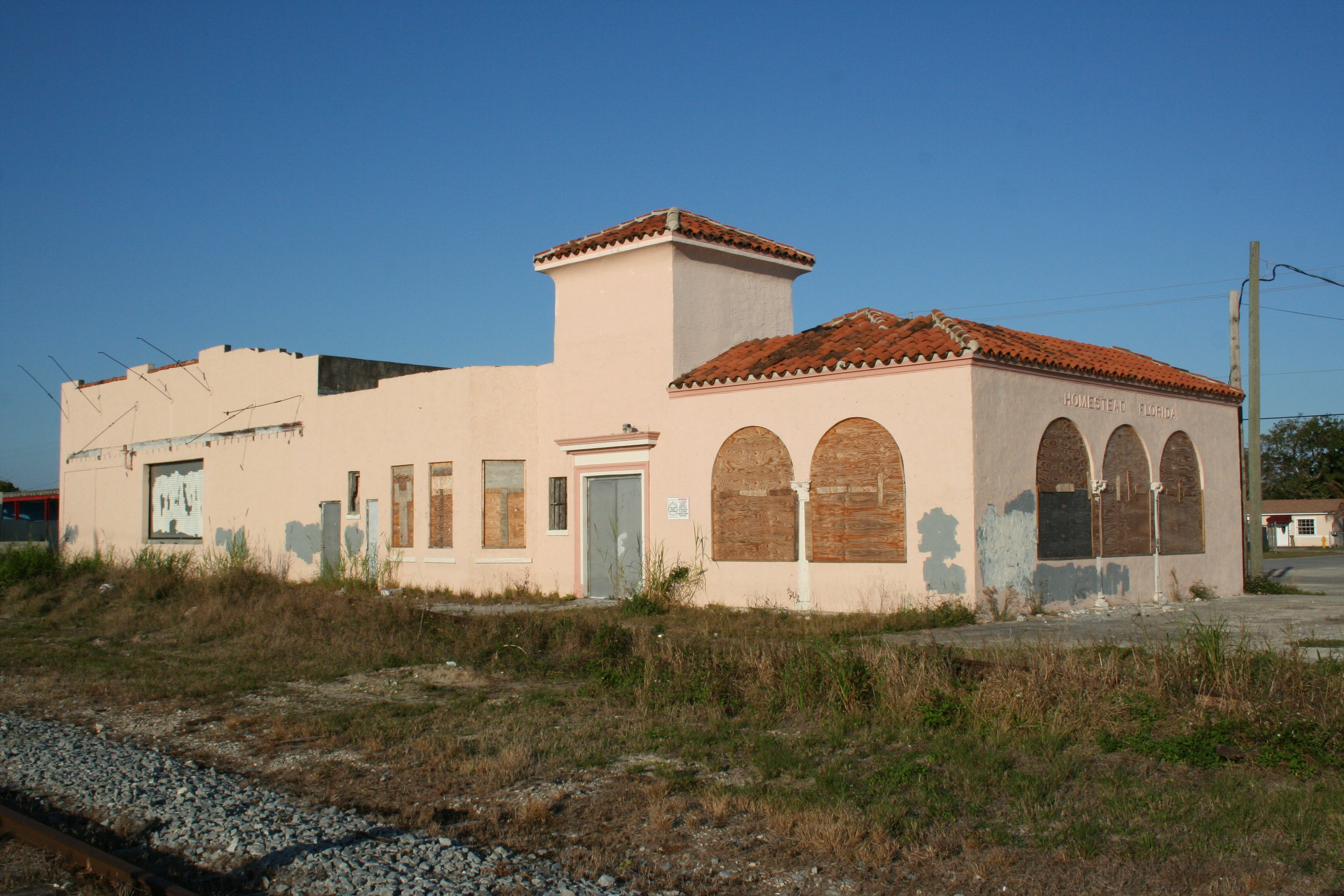
Homestead Station

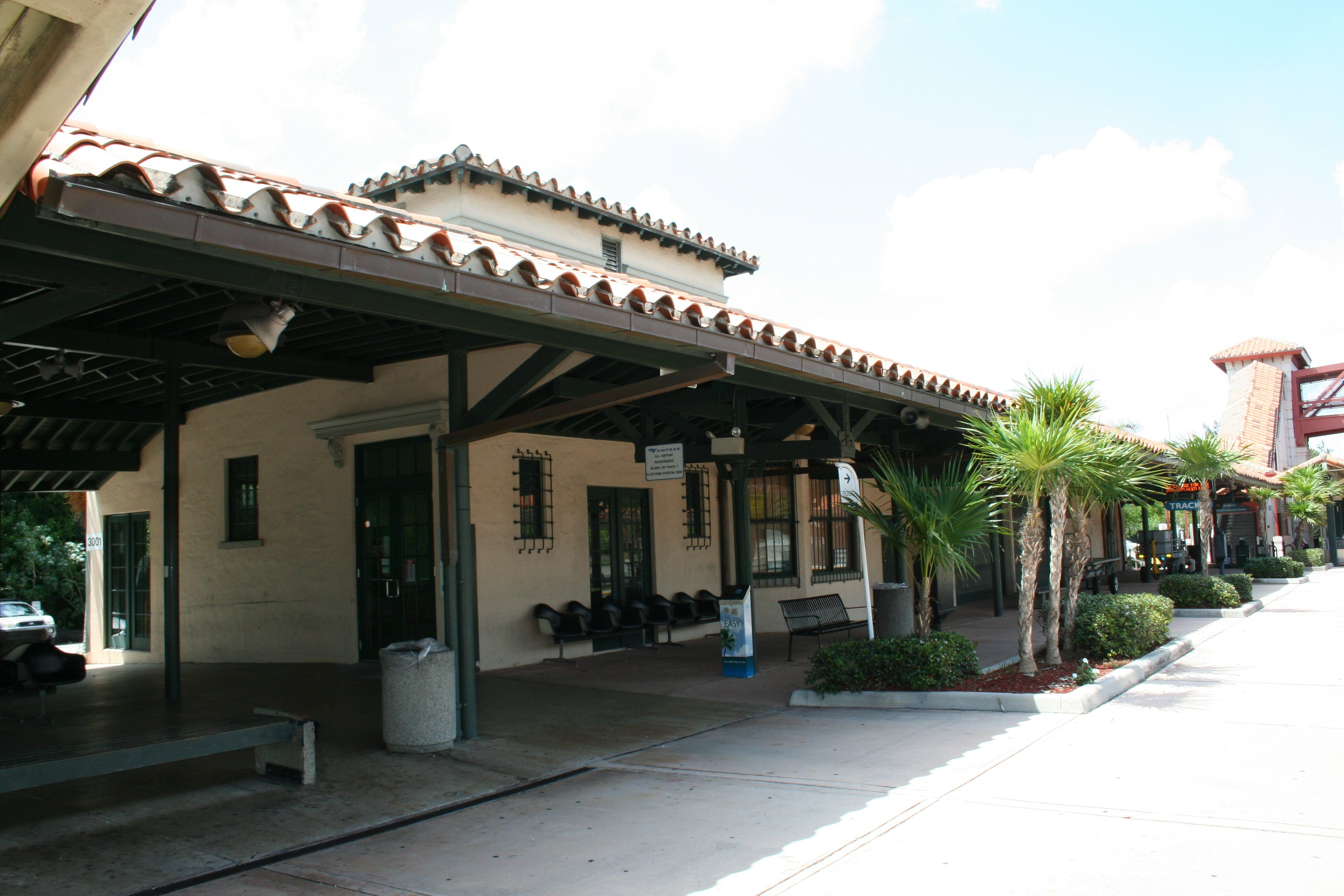
Hollywood Station
