= Hialeah station (Seaboard Air Line Railroad) =

- Hialeah Seaboard Air Line Railway Station
- U.S. National Register of Historic Places
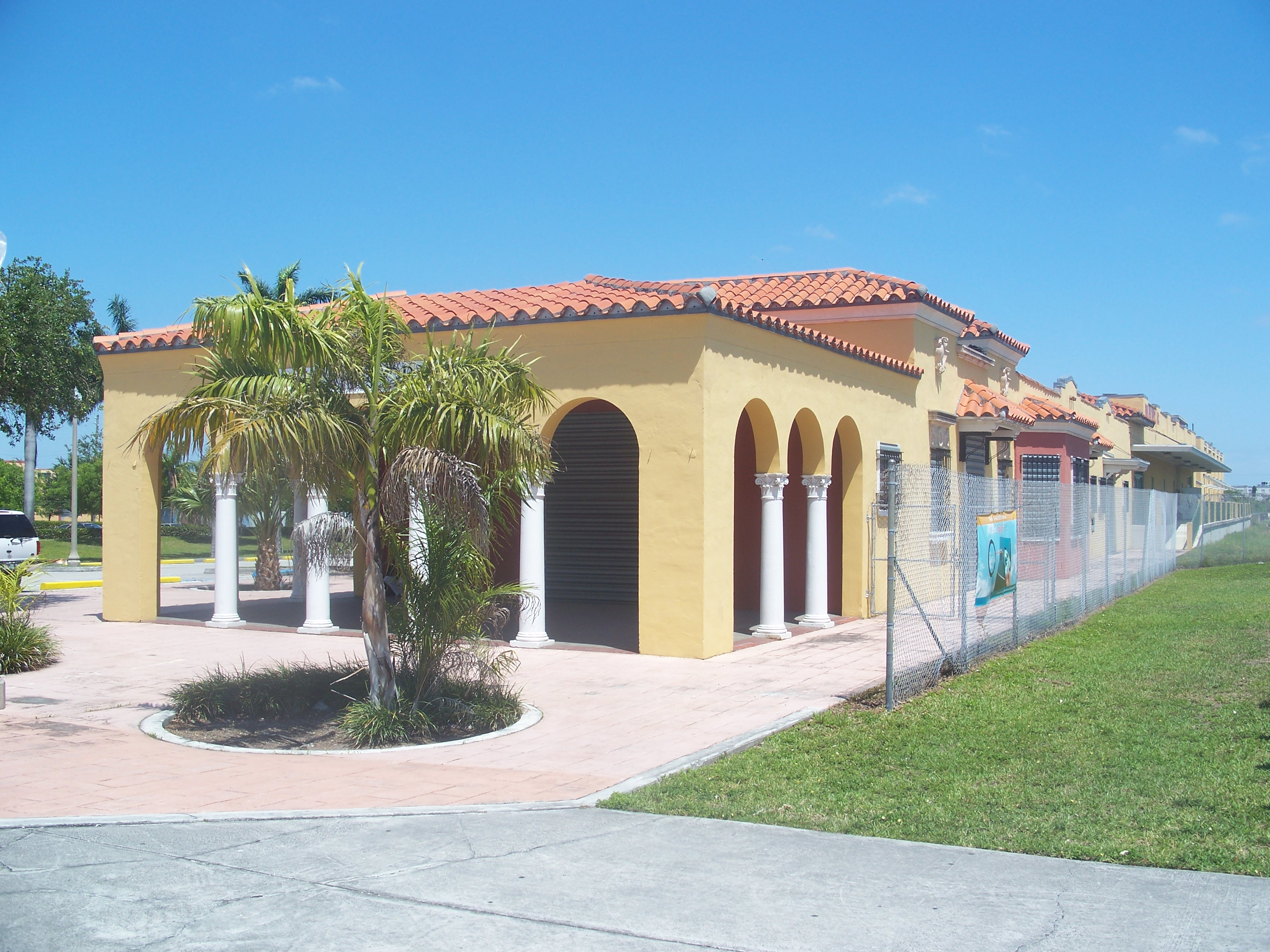

- Location within Miami Location within Florida Location within the United States
- Location: Hialeah, Florida
- Coordinates: 25°48′42″N 80°15′32″W
- Built: 1926
- Architect: Harvey & Clarke
- Architectural style: Mediterranean Revival
- NRHP reference No.: 95000854
- Added to NRHP: July 14, 1995

The Hialeah Seaboard Air Line Railway Station is a historic Seaboard Air Line Railroad depot in Hialeah, Florida. It is located at 1200 Southeast 10th Court.

Built in 1926, the station is essentially identical to the Naples Seaboard station on the southwest coast of Florida. Architects Harvey and Clarke, who also designed many other Seaboard Air Line stations of the period, designed the Mediterranean Revival station. It was served by, among other Seaboard trains, the Orange Blossom Special until 1953, and the Silver Meteor beginning in 1939. Passenger service to the station ended in 1972. On July 14, 1995, the station was added to the U.S. National Register of Historic Places.

In 1989, the South Florida Regional Transportation Authority began Tri-Rail commuter rail service to the station, adding a bus shelter style structure immediately to the south, which it calls the Hialeah Market station.

== Gallery ==
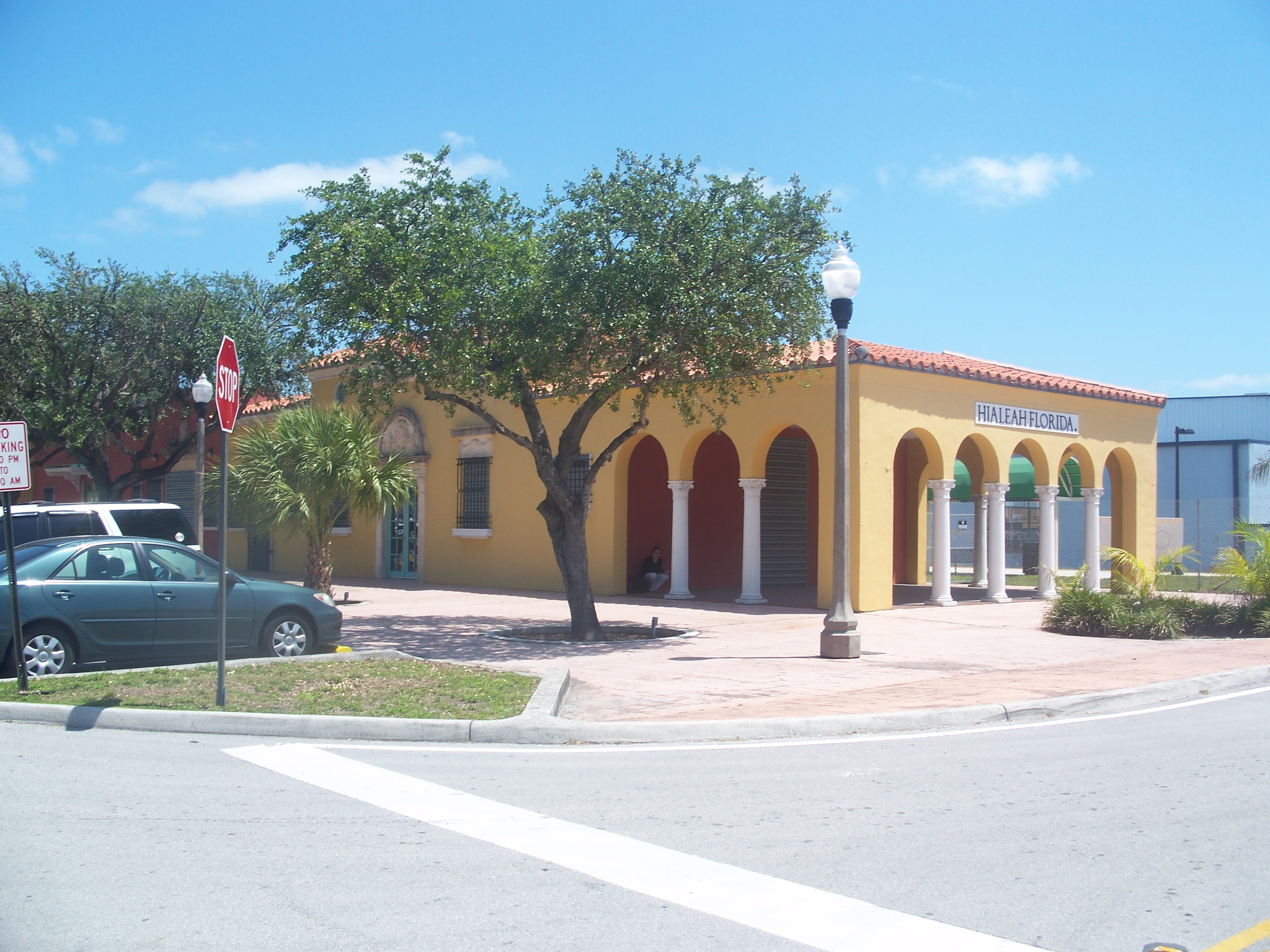
West side

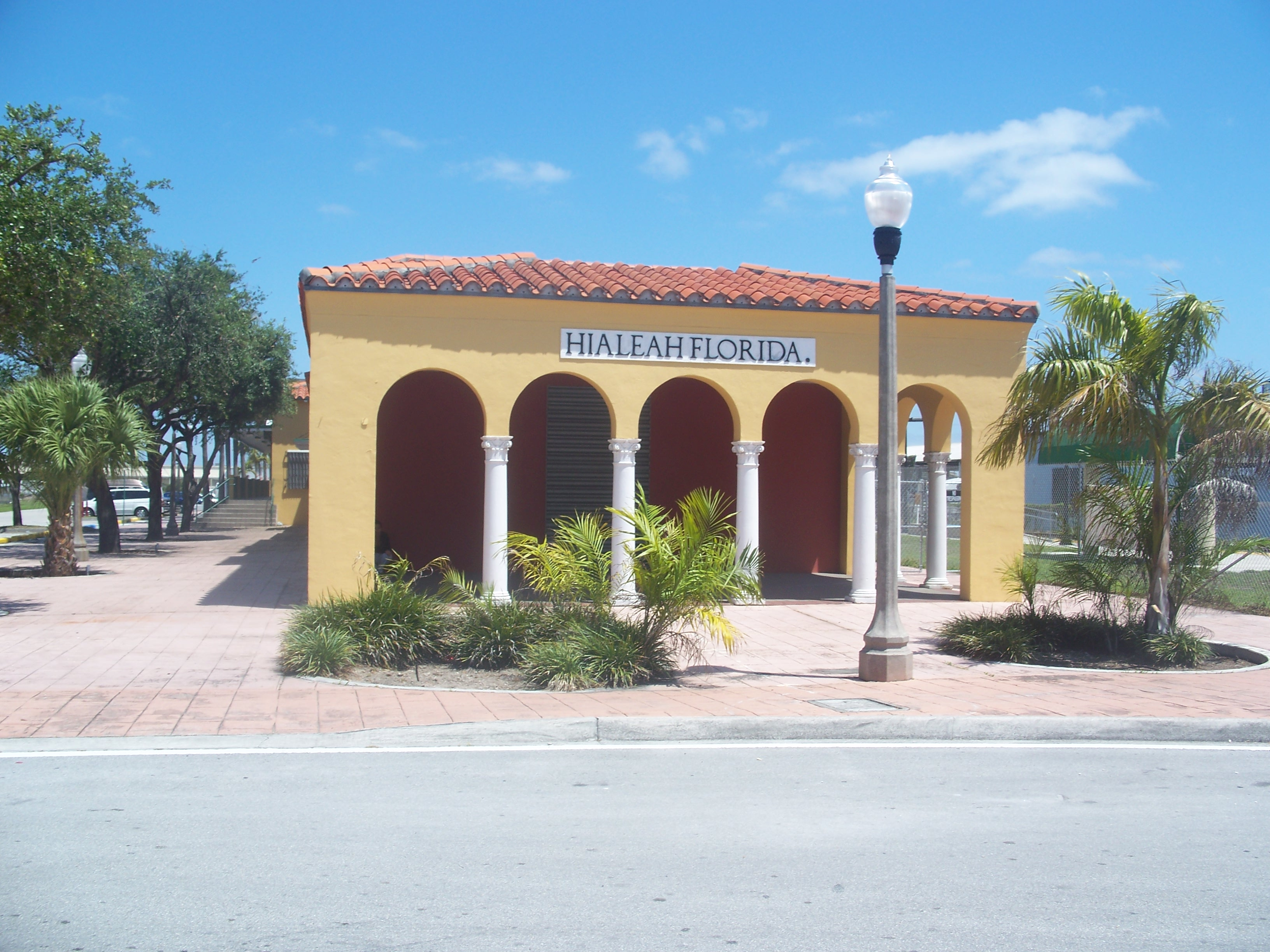
South side

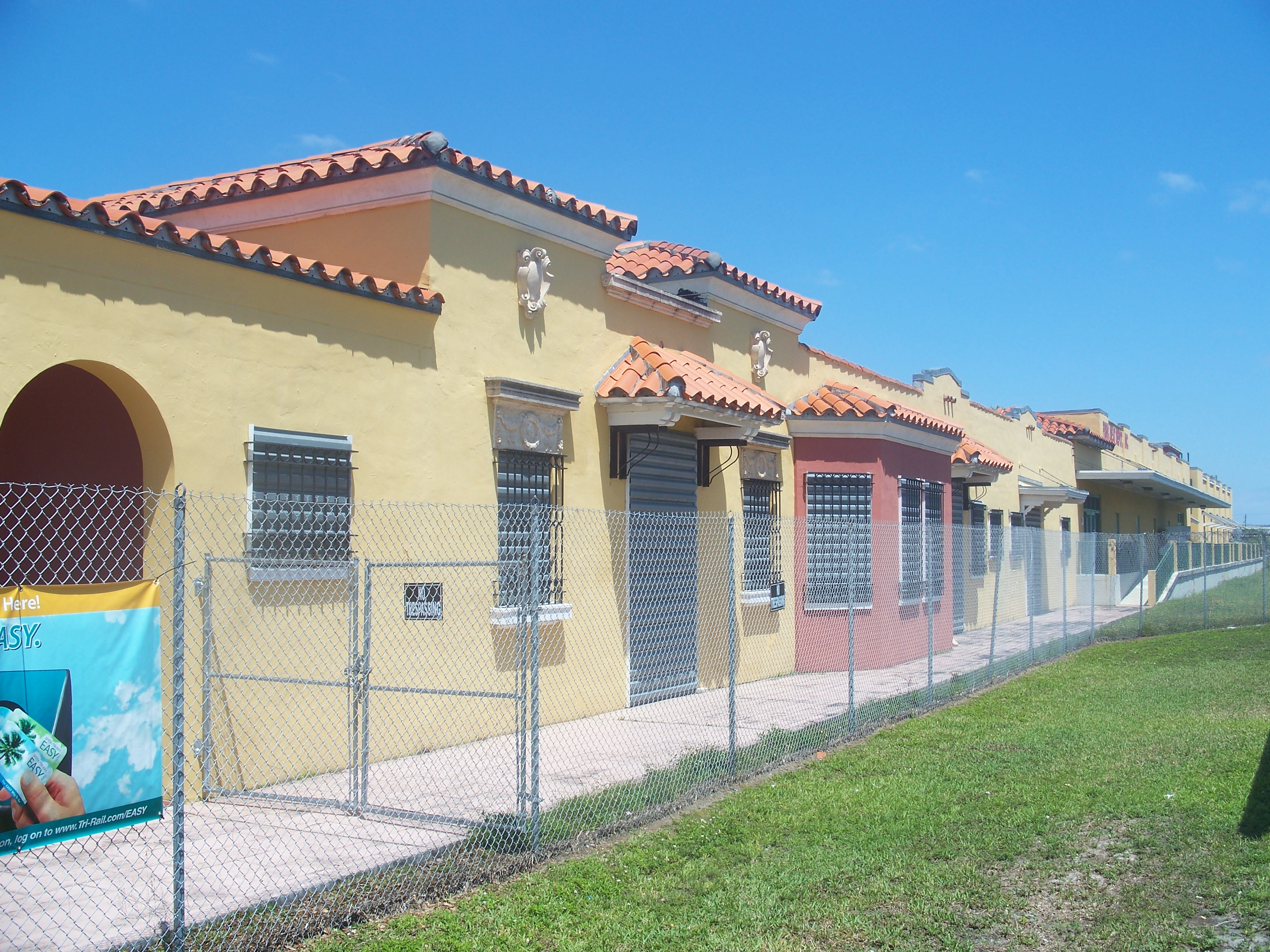
East side

Preceding station	Seaboard Air Line Railroad	Following station
Miami Terminus	Main Line	Opa Locka toward Richmond
Oleander toward Homestead	Homestead Subdivision	Terminus
