= Homestead station (Florida) =

Homestead Seaboard Air Line Railway Station
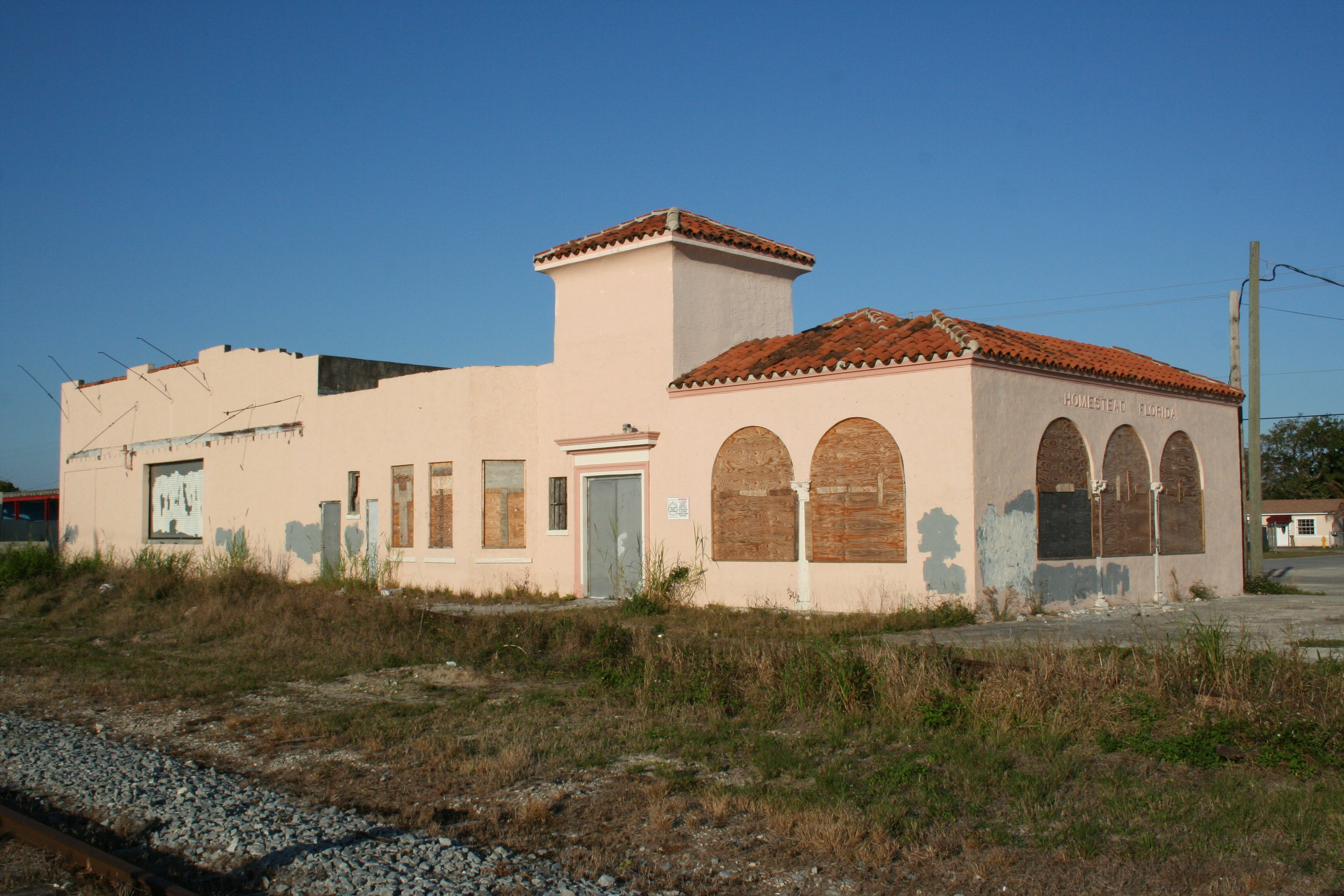
- The former Homestead Seaboard Air Line Railway station in February 2011

General information
- Location: Homestead, Florida
- Coordinates: 25°28′18″N 80°29′21″W
- Completed: 1927

Design and construction
- Architect(s): Gustav Maass, Harvey & Clarke, West Palm Beach

The Homestead Seaboard Air Line Railway Station is a historic Seaboard Air Line Railroad depot in Homestead, Florida. The station is located at 214 Northwest 9th Terrace, approximately three-quarters of a mile west of downtown Homestead.

Constructed in 1927, it is identical to the original construction of the Delray Beach Seaboard station farther north in Palm Beach County, with the sole exception of its use of the same corinthian arches used in the Naples Seaboard station and Hialeah Seaboard station, as opposed to the plain stucco arches of the Delray Beach station. It has the distinction of being both the southernmost Seaboard station and the southernmost railroad station in the United States still standing.

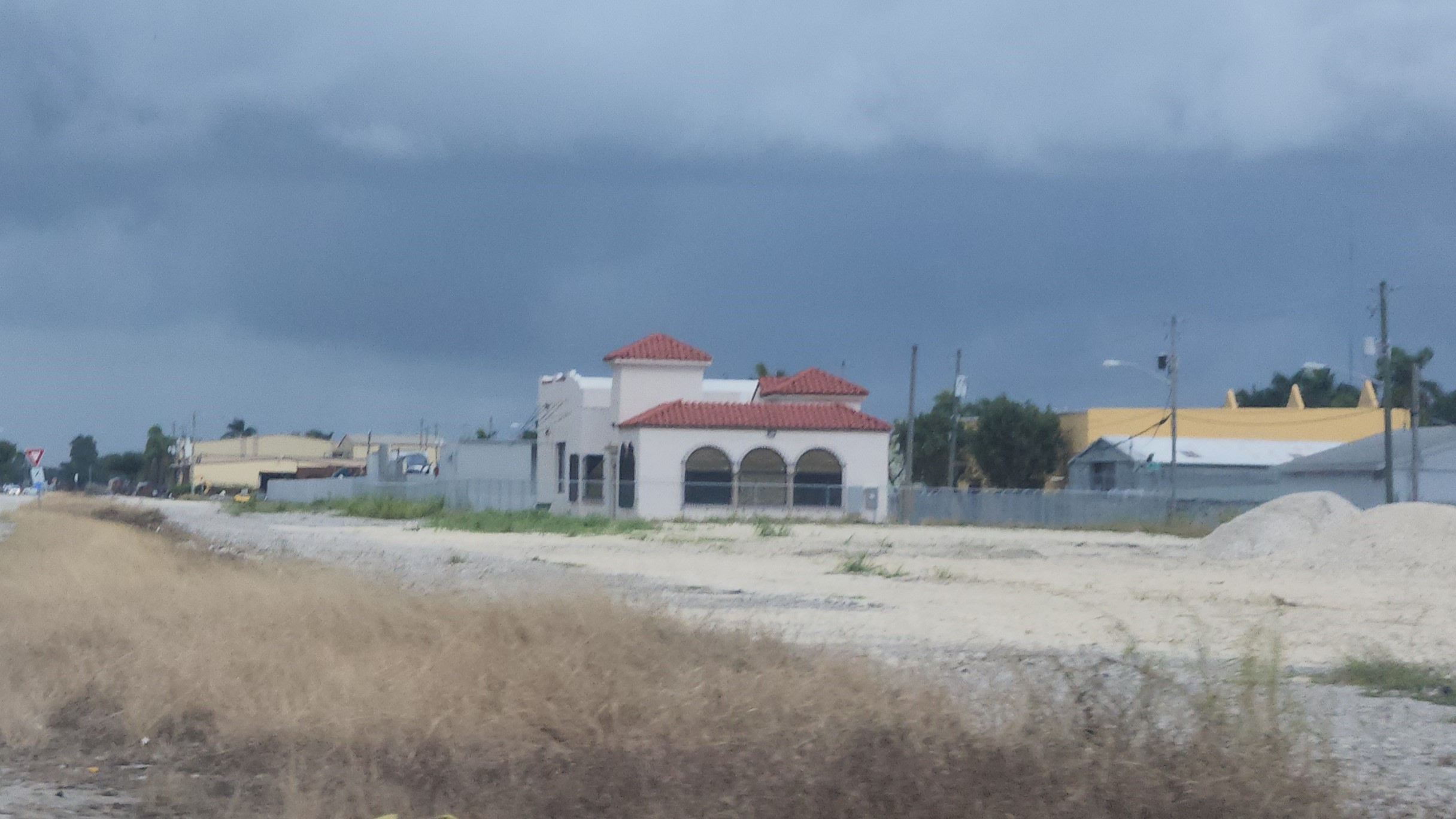
The station after restoration in 2023

Like many Seaboard stations in South Florida, the structure combined both a passenger station and a freight depot. However, the station at most only briefly saw passenger service in the late 1920s before the Seaboard extension between Hialeah Junction and Homestead became dedicated to freight traffic only. The structure has since been unused for freight handling, and is now privately owned. The adjacent tracks have been out of service since March 2019 and are owned by CSX Transportation, the successor to Seaboard.

Preceding station	Seaboard Air Line Railroad	Following station
Terminus	Homestead Subdivision	Redland toward Hialeah
