= Seaboard Air Line Railroad =

Defunct American railroad, merged to form Seaboard Coast Line

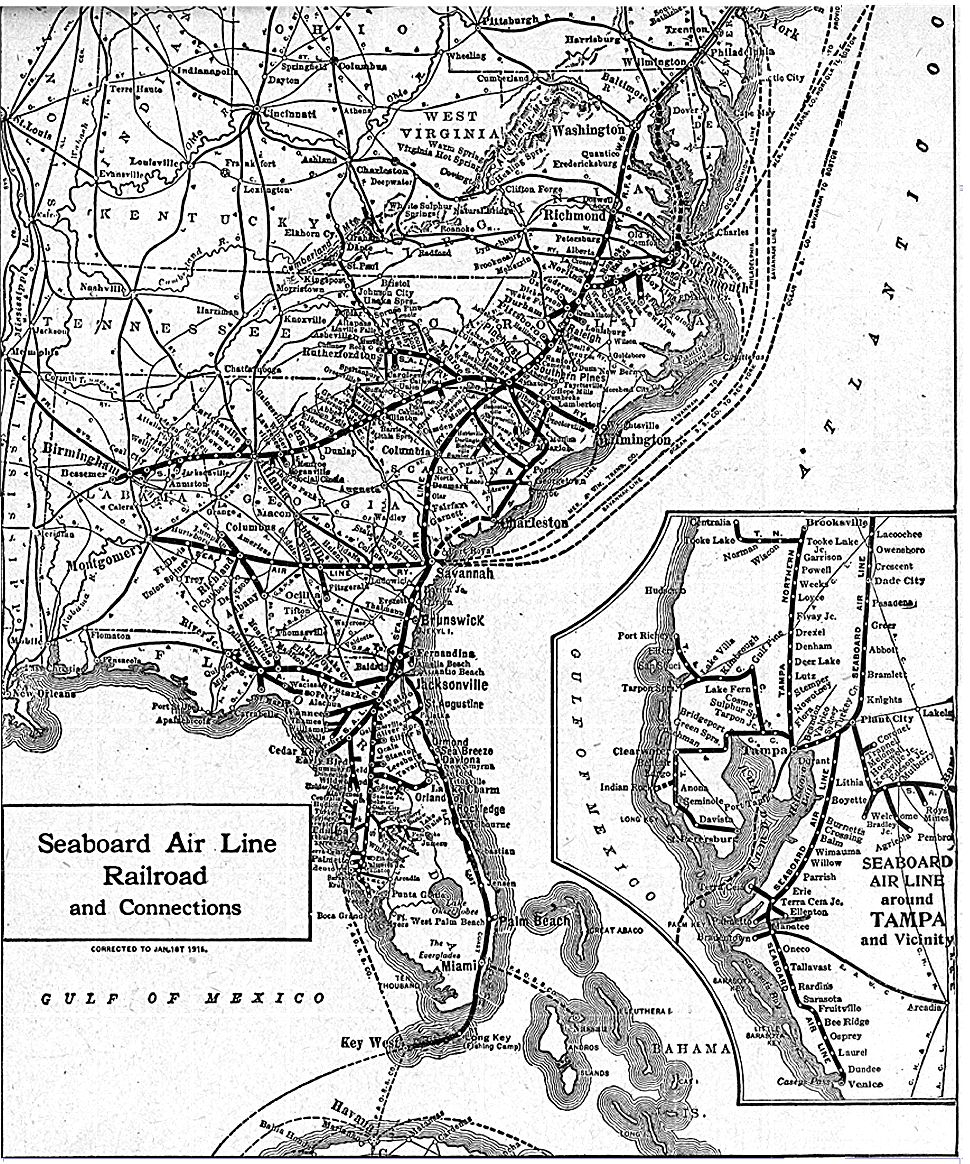
- 1916 map of the Seaboard routes

Overview
- Headquarters: Seaboard Air Line Railway Building, 1 High Street, Portsmouth, Virginia (1900–1958); 3600 W. Broad Street, Richmond, Virginia (1958–1967)
- Reporting mark: SAL
- Locale: Virginia, North Carolina, South Carolina, Georgia, Alabama, Florida
- Dates of operation: 1900–1967
- Successor: Seaboard Coast Line

Technical
- Track gauge: 4 ft 8 1/2 in (1,435 mm) standard gauge

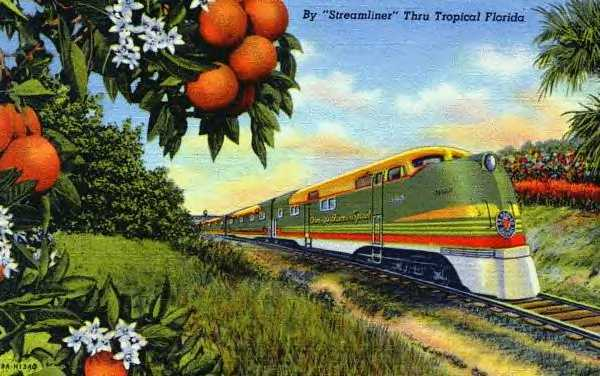
Postcard illustrating the allure of streamliner travel to Florida, along with the "citrus" paint scheme used on SAL's EMD diesel locomotives from 1939 to 1954.

The Seaboard Air Line Railroad (reporting mark SAL), known colloquially as the Seaboard Railroad during its time, was an American railroad that existed from April 14, 1900, until July 1, 1967, when it merged with the Atlantic Coast Line Railroad, its longtime rival, to form the Seaboard Coast Line Railroad. Its predecessor railroads dated from the 1830s and reorganized extensively to rebuild after the American Civil War, and by 1900 had merged together to form the SAL. The company was headquartered in Portsmouth, Virginia until 1958, when its main offices were relocated to Richmond, Virginia.

Styling itself as "The Route of Courteous Service", Seaboard, along with its main competitors Atlantic Coast Line Railroad, Florida East Coast Railway and Southern Railway, contributed greatly to the economic development of the Southeastern United States, and particularly to that of Florida throughout the first half of the 20th century. Its trains brought manufactured goods and vacationers to Florida from the Northeast and carried Southern timber, minerals, and produce, especially Florida citrus crops, to the northern states.

At the end of 1925 SAL operated 3,929 miles of road, not including its flock of subsidiaries; at the end of 1960 it reported 4,135 miles. The main line ran from Richmond, Virginia to Tampa, Florida via Raleigh, North Carolina, Columbia, South Carolina, Savannah, Georgia, and Jacksonville, Florida. Jacksonville itself was a major interchange point for passenger trains bringing travelers to the Sunshine State. Seaboard rails continued around Tampa Bay to St. Petersburg, and by 1927 extended to West Palm Beach and Miami starting from Wildwood.

Other important Seaboard routes included a line from Jacksonville via Tallahassee to a connection with the Louisville and Nashville Railroad (L&N) at Chattahoochee, Florida, for through service to New Orleans; a line to Atlanta, Georgia, and Birmingham, Alabama, connecting with the main line at Hamlet, North Carolina; and a line from the main at Norlina, North Carolina, to Portsmouth, Virginia, the earliest route of what became the Seaboard.

== History ==
=== Early 19th century ===
The complex corporate history of the Seaboard began on March 8, 1832, when its earliest predecessor, the Portsmouth and Roanoke Railroad, was chartered by the legislatures of Virginia and North Carolina to build a railroad from Portsmouth, Virginia, to the Roanoke River port of Weldon, North Carolina. After a couple of months of horse-drawn operation, the first locomotive-pulled service on this line began on September 4, 1834, with a twice-daily train from Portsmouth to Suffolk, Virginia, 17 miles away.

By June 1837 the railroad was completed to Weldon, where a connection was made with the tracks of the Wilmington and Raleigh Railroad (later part of the Atlantic Coast Line Railroad). In 1846, after suffering financial difficulties, the P&R was reorganized as the Seaboard and Roanoke Railroad, known informally as the Seaboard Road.

Meanwhile, the Raleigh and Gaston Railroad had begun construction on November 1, 1836, with the first scheduled service between its endpoints beginning on March 21, 1840. After the American Civil War, this was advertised as the Inland Air-Line Route. By 1853, the Raleigh and Gaston had connected with the Seaboard and Roanoke at Weldon, thus offering travelers through service on the 176-mile route from Portsmouth to Raleigh. Both railroads were built to 4 ft 8 1/2 in (1,435 mm) standard gauge, rather than the 5 ft (1,524 mm) gauge favored by most other railroads in the South; therefore, cars of both roads could run on the entire route, eliminating the need for travelers or freight to make a change of cars.

The R&G takeover also gave the P&R control of the Raleigh & Augusta Air-Line Railroad which the former road controlled. This was the first time "Air Line" appeared as part of a Seaboard predecessor. The R&AA-L began as the Chatham Railroad, chartered by the state on February 14, 1855 (from the 1877 booklet, "History Of The Raleigh & August Air-Line Railroad" compiled by Walter Clark, Attorney At Law) to build a rail line, "...between Deep River, at or near the Coalfields, Moncure, NC in the county of Chatham, and the City of Raleigh or some point on the North Carolina Railroad." The project was riddled with delays and finally reorganized as the Raleigh & Augusta Air-Line in 1871. It eventually reached Hamlet in 1877 which in later years was a major SAL terminal point. With a route that now extended through North Carolina the three roads offered a competitive network serving several important cities. The South was also blossoming into an industrial giant in the area of cotton, agriculture/farming, textiles, and manufacturing.

=== Civil War and Reconstruction ===
The American Civil War (1861-1865) left most railroads in the Confederate states in devastated condition. After the war, Moncure Robinson and Alexander Boyd Andrews organized the Seaboard Inland Air Line to connect Georgia and South Carolina to Portsmouth, Virginia (in the Hampton Roads area across from Norfolk, Virginia). They joined with Confederate general turned Republican political boss William Mahone to work against the conglomeration of railroads reorganized by Thomas A. Scott, who had moved up the ranks of the Pennsylvania Railroad, took control of the Chesapeake and Ohio Railroad after the Civil War, and tried to work with African American legislators to acquire (and rebuild) railroads further South. As it had before the Civil War, Virginia paid millions to get railroads rebuilt and commerce moving through its cities. Charges of corruption against Scott, and resentment against northern and black workers led to volatile situations in many areas. Eruptions of Ku Klux Klan violence centered on railroads through interior North and South Carolina.

Together the R&G, P&R, and R&AA-L formed the backbone of the future Seaboard Air Line. Moncure Robinson's son John M. Robinson acquired financial control of the trio in 1875. For advertising purposes, they were collectively known as the "Seaboard Air-Line System." The name initially had no legal authority, although that changed as Robinson continued to extend southward. The first known official use of "Seaboard Air Line" appeared when the system was building towards Atlanta. It had already acquired the Georgia, Carolina & Northern Railway which intended to reach that city from Monroe, North Carolina. Construction began in 1887 and was completed as far as Inman Park, east of Atlanta, by 1892. However, an ordinance prevented it from reaching the city directly. To circumvent this issue, the Seaboard Air Line Belt Railroad (SALB) was chartered in 1892 to build an 8-mile branch and a connection with the Nashville, Chattanooga & St. Louis at Howells. From there the SALB used trackage rights over the NC&StL to reach the downtown area. Just prior to this event, Robinson linked Rutherfordton and Wilmington, North Carolina, via Charlotte and Hamlet by acquiring the Carolina Central Railroad in 1883. Rail service between these cities opened in 1887.

==== The air line name ====
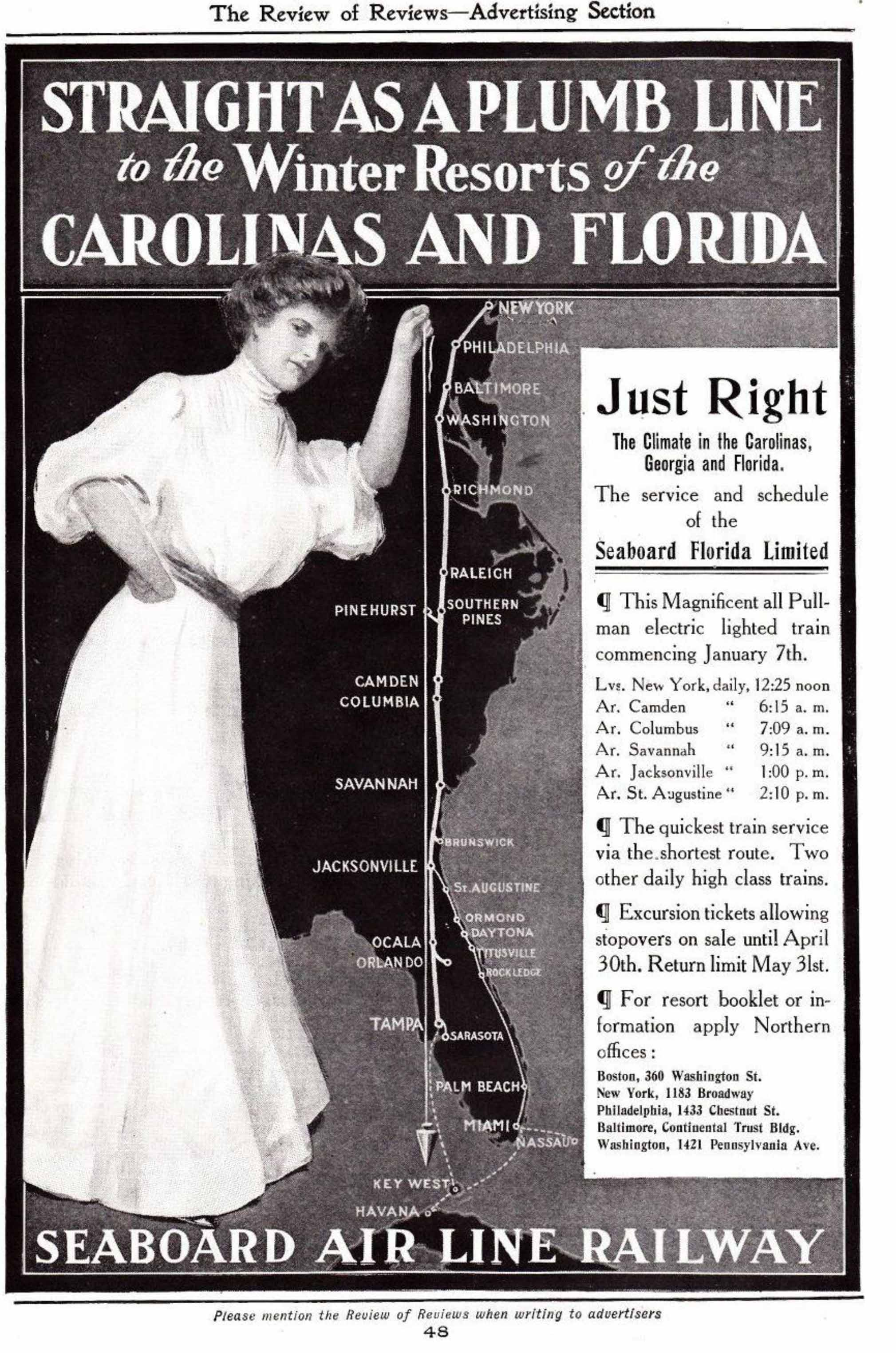
"Straight as a plumb line": Seaboard Air Line Railway advertisement illustrating the "quickest train service via the shortest route" to Florida, 1902.

In the days before air travel, air line was a common term for the shortest distance between two points: a straight line drawn through the air (or on a map), ignoring natural obstacles (i.e., "as the crow flies"). Hence, a number of 19th-century railroads used air line in their titles to suggest that their routes were shorter than those of competing roads: see list at Air-line railroad.

The Seaboard never owned an airplane. In 1940 the railroad proposed the creation of "Seaboard Airlines," but this idea was struck down by the Interstate Commerce Commission as violating federal anti-trust legislation.

During a spate of interest in aviation shares on Wall Street following Charles A. Lindbergh's trans-Atlantic flight in 1927, Seaboard Air Line shares actually attracted some investor curiosity because of the name's aviation-related connotations; only after noticing that Seaboard Air Line was actually a railroad did investors lose interest.

=== Late 19th century ===
The railroads' prosperous operations of the 1850s, hauling passengers as well as valuable cargos of cotton, tobacco and produce from the Piedmont to the tidewater port of Portsmouth, were interrupted by the Civil War, during which bridges and tracks of both railroads were destroyed at various times by Union or Confederate troops.

Prosperity returned after the war, with the efficiently managed Seaboard Road showing a profit even during the Panic of 1873, and paying stockholders an annual dividend of 8 percent for many years. In 1871, the Raleigh and Gaston acquired the Raleigh and Augusta Air-Line Railroad, which, however, reached only to Hamlet, North Carolina. When the R&G and its subsidiary fell into financial straits in 1873, the Seaboard's president, John M. Robinson, acquired financial control of them, becoming president of all three railroads in 1875.

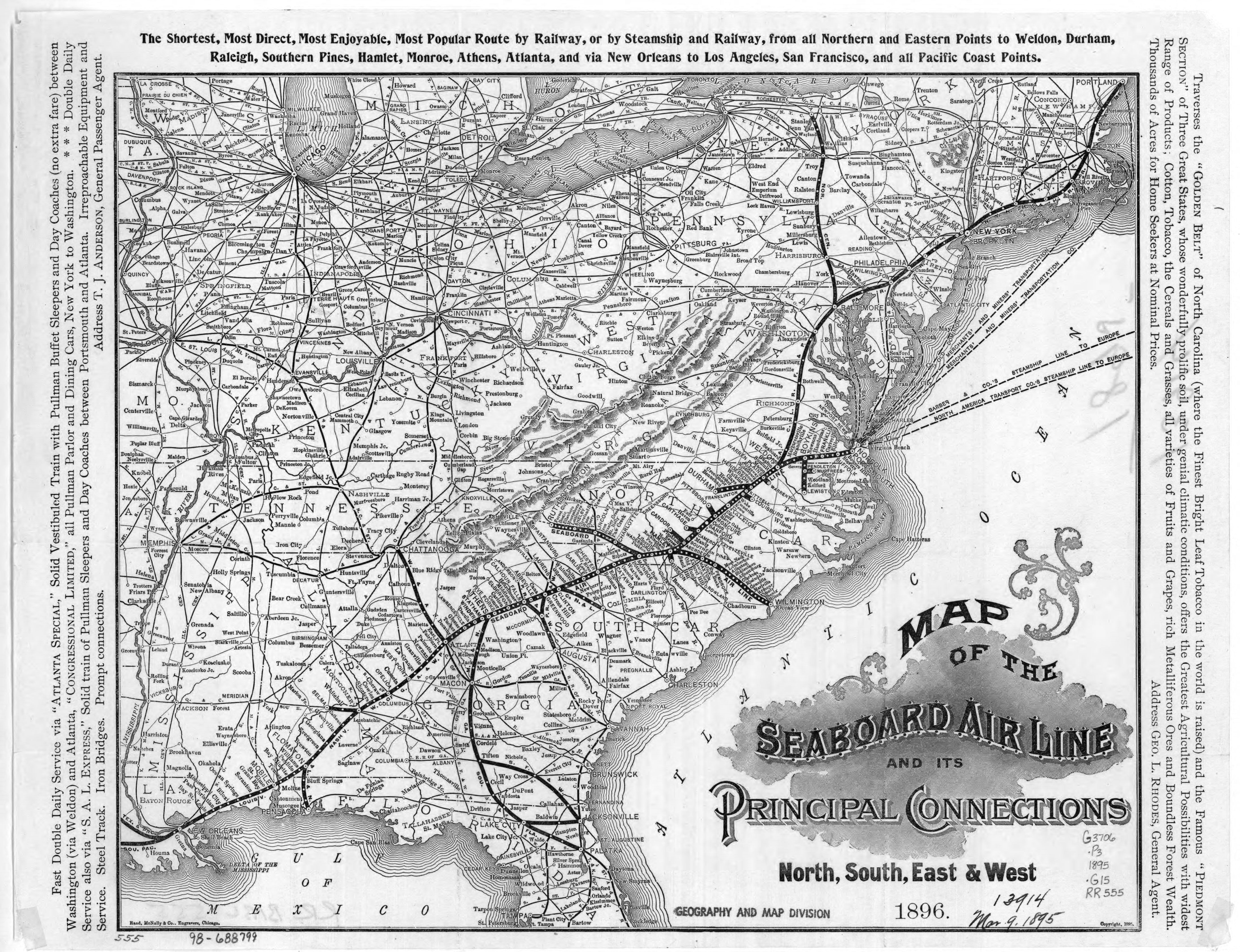
Map of the Seaboard Air-Line System in 1896, showing connecting routes prior to the 1900 amalgamation into a single corporation.

==== The Seaboard Air-Line System ====
By 1881, the Seaboard and Roanoke, the Raleigh and Gaston, and others were operating as a coordinated system under the Seaboard Air-Line System name for marketing purposes, combining the nicknames of the two principal roads. In 1889, the Seaboard leased the still-unfinished Georgia, Carolina and Northern Railway, providing a link from Monroe, North Carolina, (on the Seaboard line to Charlotte, North Carolina, acquired in 1881) to Atlanta, Georgia, (completed in 1892).

During its heyday in the 1890s, the system prided itself on offering excellent passenger service between Atlanta and the northeast. A daily coach and Pullman train, the S.A.L. Express, ran from Atlanta to the Seaboard Road's depot and wharf at Portsmouth, where passengers could transfer to steamships for direct passage to Baltimore, Philadelphia and New York. The system's premier train, however, was the Atlanta Special, running in daily service between Atlanta and Washington, using the Atlantic Coast Line's tracks from Weldon to Richmond, and the tracks of the Richmond, Fredericksburg and Potomac from Richmond to Washington.

Between 1898 and 1900, Seaboard affiliate Richmond, Petersburg and Carolina completed the laying of track from Norlina to Richmond, thereby providing an all-Seaboard route from Atlanta to Richmond.

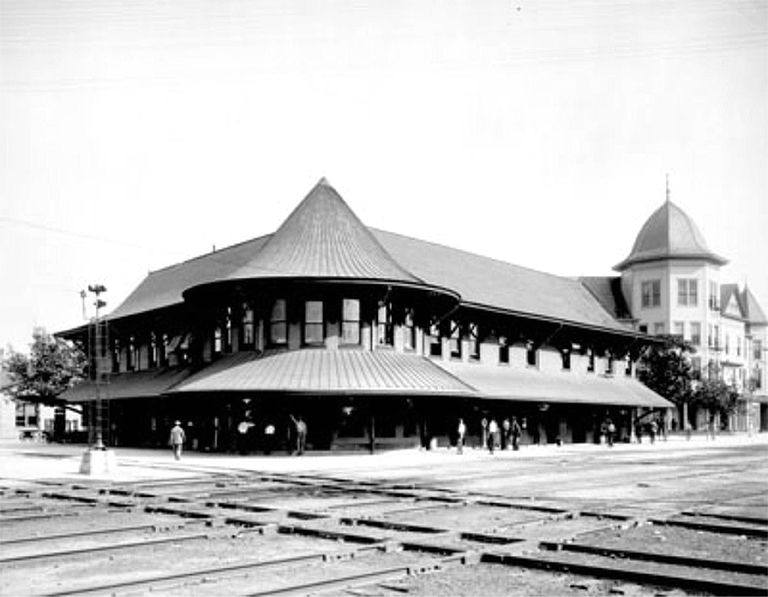
Seaboard depot and hotel, about 1915, at the important junction of Hamlet, North Carolina, where two main SAL routes crossed.

As important as the route to the major railroad hub of Atlanta was, access to Florida resorts and markets would be even more important to the railroad's success in years to come. In the last two decades of the 19th century, the pieces of the route to Florida began to fall into place. Between 1885 and 1887, the Palmetto Railroad, later reorganized as the Palmetto Railway, had built southward from Hamlet, North Carolina, on the Seaboard main line, to Cheraw, South Carolina. In 1895, the Seaboard took control of the Palmetto Railway and extended the tracks to Columbia.

Also in 1895, the Savannah, Americus and Montgomery Railway, a Savannah-to-Montgomery route, was bought by a syndicate that included the Richmond bankers John L. Williams and Sons. John Skelton Williams, a son of John L. Williams, became president of the line, renaming it the Georgia and Alabama Railway. In January 1899, the Williams syndicate offered to purchase a majority of shares in the Seaboard and Roanoke, which included controlling interests in each of the affiliated companies and subordinated railroads in the Seaboard Air Line system. Although a New York syndicate of various stockholders headed by Thomas Fortune Ryan bitterly opposed the deal, control of all of the railroad properties comprising the Seaboard system was formally transferred to the Williams syndicate in February 1899. Immediately, Williams and his financial backers sought to expand into the Florida market.

==== Seaboard predecessors in Florida ====
In 1860, the Florida, Atlantic and Gulf Central Railroad (FA&GC) completed construction of a line running west from Jacksonville, Florida, to Lake City, Florida. That same year, the Florida Railroad opened from Fernandina, just north of Jacksonville, southwest to Cedar Key on the Gulf Coast. In 1863, the Pensacola and Georgia Railroad (P&G) completed a line running east from Quincy, Florida, through Tallahassee to Lake City, where it connected with the FA&GC.

In 1868, the P&G and the FA&GC were acquired by carpetbaggers, with the P&G being renamed the Jacksonville, Pensacola and Mobile Railroad (JP&M), into which the FA&GC — now called the Florida Central Railroad — was consolidated in 1870. Meanwhile, in 1871, the Florida Railroad was reorganized as the Atlantic, Gulf and West India Transit Company. Through two new subsidiaries, the Peninsular Railroad and the Tropical Florida Railroad, the Atlantic, Gulf and West India opened two new lines, one running to Ocala and Tampa from a junction with the main line at Waldo, and another running from Ocala to Wildwood.

In 1881, Sir Edward Reed acquired the Atlantic, Gulf and West India and its subsidiaries and reorganized them as the Florida Transit Company. The following year, Reed acquired the JP&M along with its subsidiary, the Florida Central, both of which he combined together as the Florida Central and Western Railroad. In 1883, Reed reorganized the Florida Transit Company as the Florida Transit and Peninsular Railroad. Then, in 1884, Reed brought both the Florida Central and Western and the Florida Transit and Peninsular under the umbrella of a single entity, the Florida Railway and Navigation Company, which instantly became the largest railroad in Florida. In 1886, the company was reorganized as the Florida Central and Peninsular Railroad (FC&P).

In late 1892, the FC&P began construction of a new line running north from a junction near Jacksonville to Savannah, Georgia. The FC&P had that same year already leased the South Bound Railroad, which ran north from Savannah to Columbia, South Carolina. Thus, when the FC&P finished construction in late 1893, it had 1,000 miles of rail and a new "air line" extending straight from a connection with the Richmond and Danville Railroad in South Carolina into Jacksonville, resulting in not only a saving of several hours of travel time, but also connecting New York and Tampa.

This direct entrée into Florida did not escape the notice of John Skelton Williams and his financial backers. In April 1899, only two months after assuming formal control of the various railroads in the Seaboard system, the Williams syndicate purchased a majority stock interest in the FC&P for $3.5 million.

=== Early 20th century ===
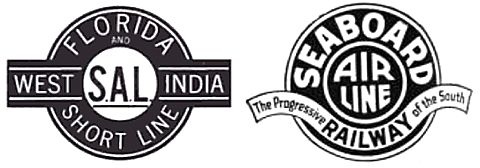
Two early logos used in advertising by the Seaboard, from about 1900 and 1916, respectively. These foreshadow the design of the famous "Through the heart of the South" logo, displayed at the top of this article.

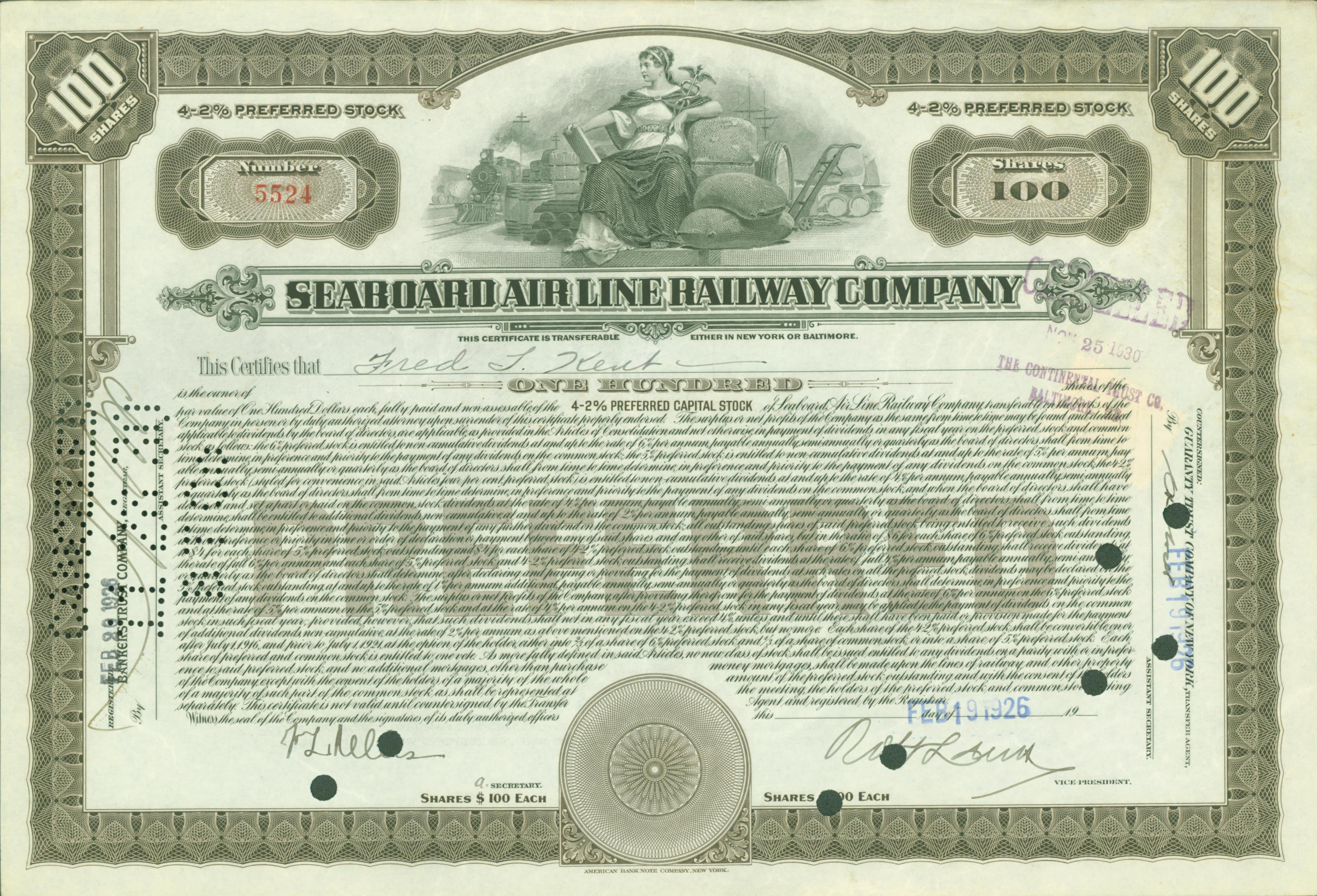
Preferred share of the Seaboard Air Line Railway Company, issued 19. February 1926

On April 14, 1900, the Seaboard Air Line Railway was incorporated, comprising 19 railroads in which it owned all or most of the capital stock. Williams was the first president of the new corporation, which advertised its north–south route as the "Florida-West India Short Line." James H. Dooley, veteran of several rail mergers in the South, helped organize the SAL and served as chairman of SAL's executive council.

On June 3, 1900, through service from New York to Tampa, Florida, was inaugurated, with trains operated by the Pennsylvania Railroad from New York to Washington, D.C.; by the Richmond, Fredericksburg and Potomac Railroad from Washington to Richmond; and by the Seaboard from Richmond to Tampa, an arrangement that lasted until the creation of Amtrak in 1971. On July 1, 1900, the Seaboard formally assumed operation of the Georgia and Alabama, the FC&P and the Atlantic, Suwannee River and Gulf railroads. In 1903, the FC&P, which had been controlled through stock ownership and operated separately under a lease agreement, was formally consolidated within the Seaboard.

In 1904, Seaboard subsidiary Atlanta and Birmingham Air Line Railway, purchased the previous year, completed construction and extended the Atlanta route to Birmingham, Alabama, the largest center of iron and steel production in the South, and a valuable endpoint for the Seaboard.

Upon formation, the Seaboard inherited multiple repair shop sites from predecessor railroads, most of which were obsolete. A fire at the Portsmouth, Virginia shops in 1903 resulted in the plant being upgraded and modernized. To serve the southern section of the system, new shops were built on the west side of Jacksonville, Florida in 1907, which became the primary diesel shops after 1948. Rather than build any other heavy back shops, the Seaboard chose to equip several major roundhouse terminals to handle medium repairs in addition to the usual "running" repairs on locomotives.

Unfortunately, the new 2,600-mile railroad did not prosper as expected in its early years. Thomas Fortune Ryan, who had opposed the Williams syndicate when it purchased the controlling interests in the various Seaboard companies, succeeded in assuming control of the railroad in 1904. Ryan's policies, however, proved disastrous for the Seaboard's finances. Following the Panic of 1907, the railroad went into receivership and Ryan was ousted. S. Davies Warfield, a Seaboard director and member of the railroad's executive committee, who had assisted Williams in forming the corporation, was appointed one of the receivers, and was subsequently named chairman. In 1912, Warfield — who was the uncle of the Baltimore-born Wallis Warfield Simpson, the future Duchess of Windsor – became the majority stock owner of the Seaboard. By 1915, the railroad had recovered. However, along with most other U.S. railroads, the Seaboard was nationalized during the railroad crisis brought on by World War I and was run by the United States Railroad Administration from December 28, 1917, to March 1, 1920.

==== Warfield and the South Florida expansion ====
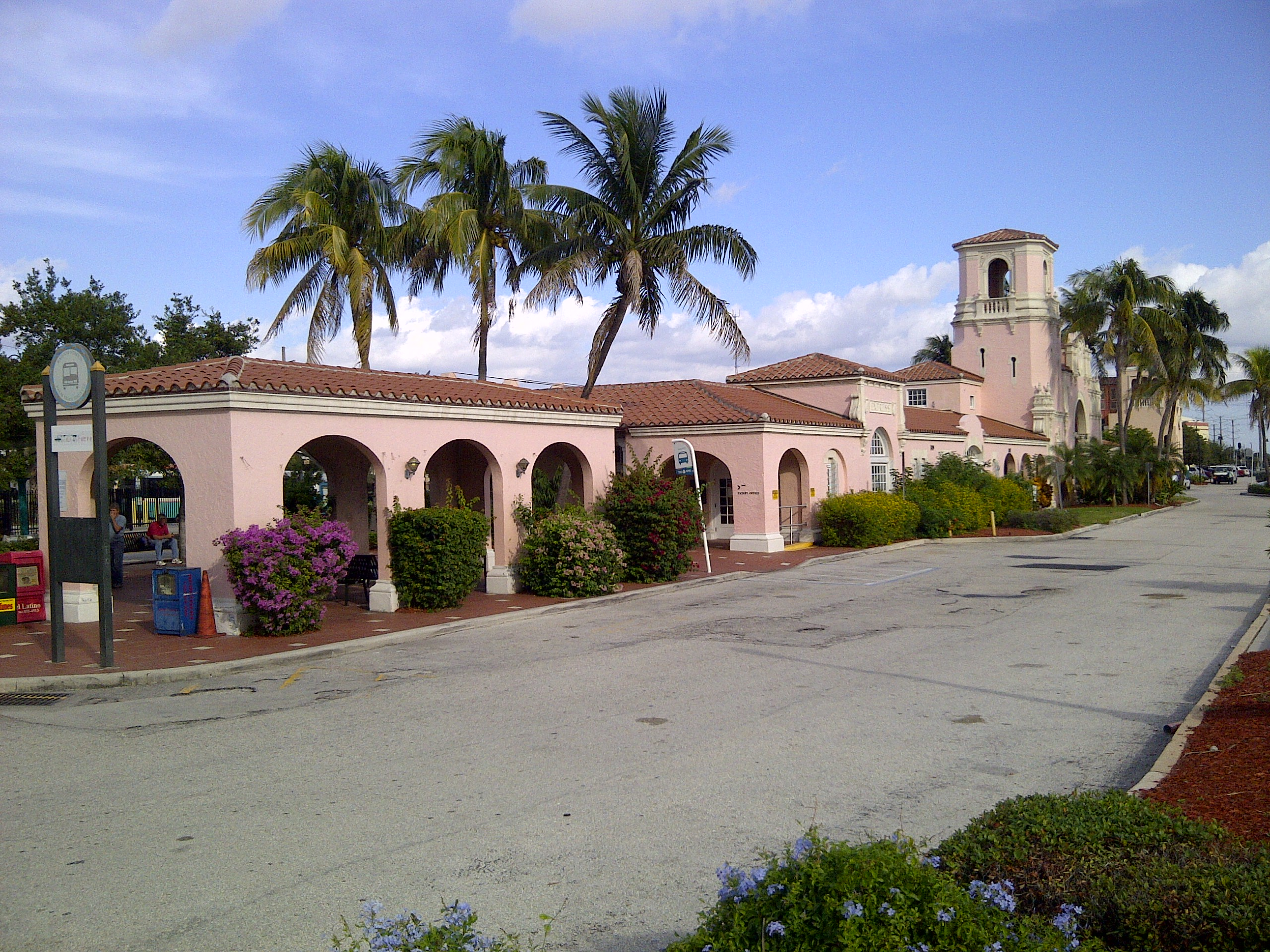
Street side of the 1925 SAL passenger station in West Palm Beach, Florida, now used by both Amtrak and the Tri-Rail regional rail line.

With an influx of tourists traveling to rapidly developing Florida, the Seaboard enjoyed a prosperous decade in the 1920s. In 1924, Warfield, now president and CEO of the railroad, began building a 204-mile extension, called the Florida Western and Northern Railroad, from the Seaboard mainline in Coleman, Florida south to West Palm Beach, which for almost thirty years had been the exclusive domain of the Florida East Coast Railway. Some 35 miles northwest of West Palm Beach, the extension ran through Indiantown, which Warfield planned to make the new southern headquarters of the Seaboard. The extension was constructed in record time, and opened in January 1925.

Later in 1925, Warfield constructed the Gross-Callahan Cutoff, which allowed time-sensitive trains to bypass congested Jacksonville, and built the Valrico Cutoff, which provided a direct route from Tampa to West Palm Beach. Warfield also leased the Charlotte Harbor and Northern Railway, which ran from central Florida to Boca Grande, as well as the East and West Coast Railway between Arcadia and Manatee County.

Warfield, however, was not content with what seemed to be a complete Seaboard system in Florida, and at the end of 1925, announced two new extensions, one from West Palm Beach to Miami and another from Arcadia to Fort Myers and Naples. Groundbreaking for the Miami extension took place in Hialeah in January 1926, and by December 1926, the line was open for freight. From January 7 through January 9, 1927, Warfield took a large faction of dignitaries on a special run of the luxurious Orange Blossom Special, beginning at Arcadia and proceeding south to Naples, then doubling back over to the east coast and proceeding south from West Palm Beach to Miami.

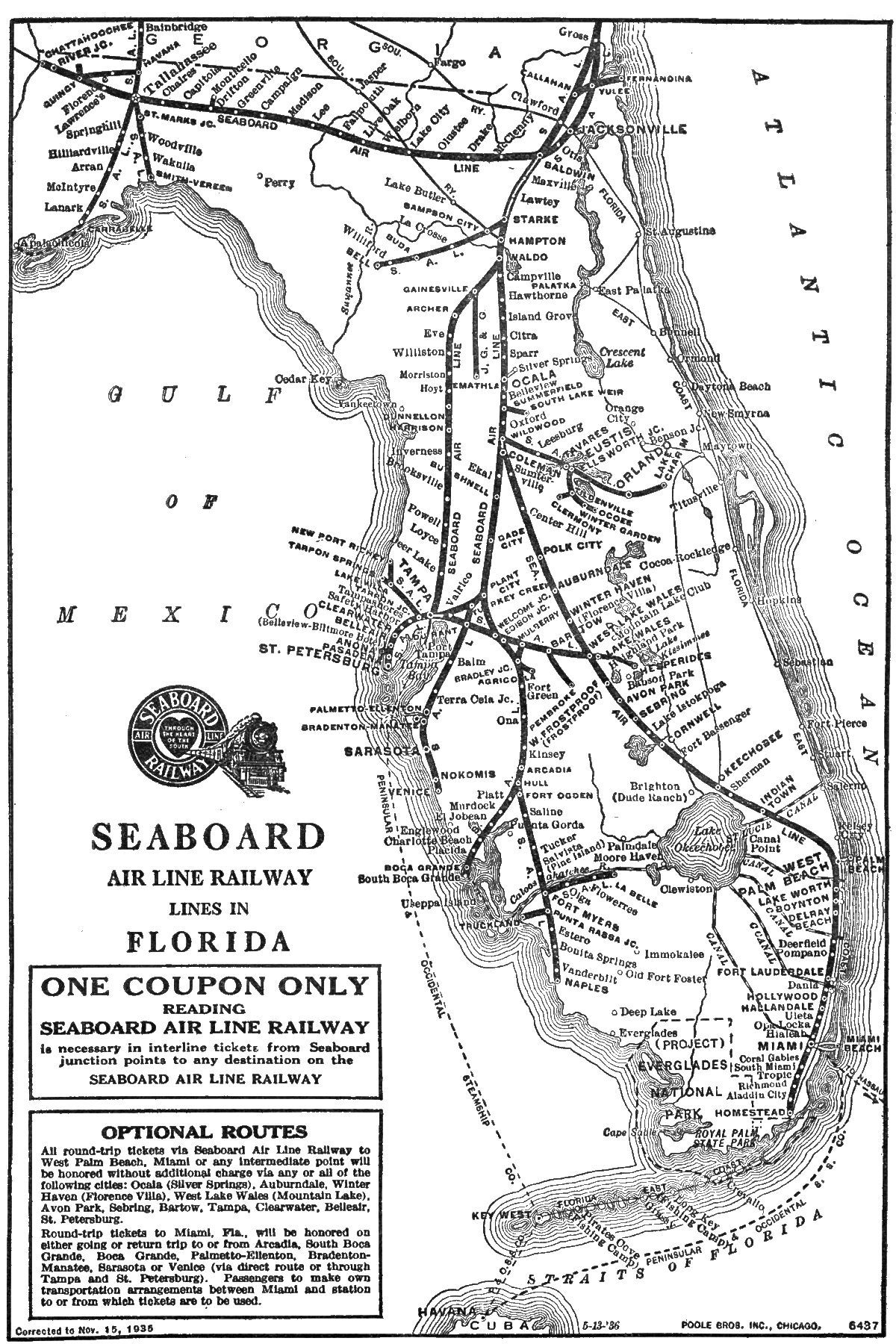
1936 system map of SAL's Florida operations, showing extension of routes into South Florida built in the 1920s.

Warfield had the West Palm Beach architectural firm of Harvey & Clarke, led by Gustav Maass, design a series of now historic Mediterranean Revival stations in West Palm Beach, Lake Worth, Boynton Beach, Delray Beach, Deerfield Beach, Fort Lauderdale, Hollywood, and Hialeah, as well as in Naples and Fort Myers. In April 1927, Warfield completed a push of the Miami extension even further south to Homestead, and had his architects erect a Mediterranean Revival station there as well.

==== The Great Depression and World War II ====
Warfield died in October 1927 and was succeeded by Legh R. Powell, who had worked his way up on the financial side of the railroad. The railroad was in an unfortunate position due to being geographically sandwiched in the South between two well-to-do rivals, the Atlantic Coast Line Railroad (ACL) and the Southern Railway. In addition, Warfield's expansion down the west coast of Florida was seen as an unnecessary extravagance due to the presence of the ACL in the same area. In December 1930, the Seaboard again entered bankruptcy following the collapse of the Florida land boom and the onset of the Great Depression. The United States District Court in Norfolk, Virginia—which would oversee the railroad for the next 14½ years—appointed Powell as a receiver.

With loans obtained from the federal government's Reconstruction Finance Corporation, the railroad set about modernizing its equipment with new steam freight locomotives and new and rebuilt passenger cars. In 1942, to cut expenses, the SAL abandoned a 27-mile section of its then only 15-year-old Fort Myers-Naples extension between South Fort Myers and Naples, along with sections of two other little-used branch lines from the extension. By aggressive marketing and technological innovations that drew travelers to the line, such as the highly popular Silver Meteor streamliner, introduced in 1939, Seaboard managed to regain its financial footing. The economic boom of World War II also helped replenish the railroad's coffers. In 1944, the Silver Meteor alone turned a profit of over $8 million, nearly as much as the deficit of the whole railroad had been in the Depression year of 1933.

In May 1945, all of the Seaboard properties were sold under foreclosure at an auction sale to bondholders for $52 million. In 1946, the railroad was reorganized as the Seaboard Air Line Railroad.

=== Later 20th century ===
Quick to recognize the cost savings of diesel power over steam in the postwar period, the Seaboard dieselized all of its mainline trains by 1953. In the same decade, the railroad installed CTC signaling across most of its system, generating further savings of time and money, as well as improved safety. However, like all American railroads, Seaboard saw a decline in revenues, especially in passenger traffic, from the 1950s into the 1960s, in the face of growing competition from airlines, trucking companies and the Interstate Highway System. In 1960 SAL reported 9910 million net ton-miles of revenue freight and 484 million passenger-miles, not including Gainesville Midland and Tavares & Gulf.

As a strategic move to reduce costs and counter the competition of airlines and trucking companies, merger with the parallel system of Seaboard's chief rival, Atlantic Coast Line Railroad (ACL) was first proposed in 1958, but was not approved by the Interstate Commerce Commission until 1967. On July 1 of that year, SAL and ACL merged to form Seaboard Coast Line Railroad (SCL). The seeming redundancy of the name stems from combining the most common short forms of the two railroads' names: the public and the railroads themselves for many years had referred to SAL as "Seaboard" and ACL as "Coast Line."

On May 1, 1971, SCL turned over all its passenger operations to the newly formed Amtrak, which continued to operate the profitable Silver Meteor and Silver Star alongside a former Coast Line streamliner, the Champion, while eliminating others.

By 1972, Seaboard Coast Line and its corporate relatives Louisville and Nashville, Georgia Railroad, Atlanta and West Point Railroad, Western Railway of Alabama and Clinchfield Railroad began advertising themselves as the Family Lines System, and applying the Family Lines logo to their rolling stock. However, the Family Lines name was merely a marketing strategy, and all the railroads remained separate legal and operating entities.

The Family Lines System and the Chessie System became subsidiaries of the newly created CSX Corporation on November 1, 1980, but continued to operate as separate railroads. The Family Lines name and logo were dropped when all of the Family Lines merged on December 29, 1982, to form the Seaboard System.

On July 1, 1986, the Seaboard System's name was changed to CSX Transportation. Subsequently, the Chessie System was merged into CSX Transportation on August 31, 1987.

== Presidents ==
- John Skelton Williams (April 28, 1900 – 1904)
- James M. Barr
- W. A. Garret
- N. S. Meldrum (1911 or before – 1912)
- William J. Harahan (1912 – )
- S. Davies Warfield (1918 – 1927)
- Legh R. Powell, Jr. (1927 – 1952)
- John W. Smith (1952 – 1967)

== Steamship operations ==
The "Old Bay Line," as the Baltimore Steam Packet Company was commonly known, operated steamships between Norfolk, Virginia, and Baltimore, Maryland, carrying mail and freight as well as passengers and vehicles on the overnight run.

The Seaboard and Roanoke acquired a controlling interest in the steamship company in 1851, providing valuable northward connections from the docks at Norfolk for the railroad's passenger and freight business. Control passed to the Richmond, Fredericksburg and Potomac Railroad in 1901, but in 1922, with S. Davies Warfield as its president, the Old Bay Line became a wholly owned subsidiary of the SAL. In that same year, Warfield was named president of the Seaboard as well.

In 1941, the Chesapeake Steamship Company, jointly owned by the Atlantic Coast Line and the Southern, was merged into the Old Bay Line. Due to the decline of business with the rise of interstate highways and air travel, the steamship company was liquidated in 1962.

== Passenger trains ==
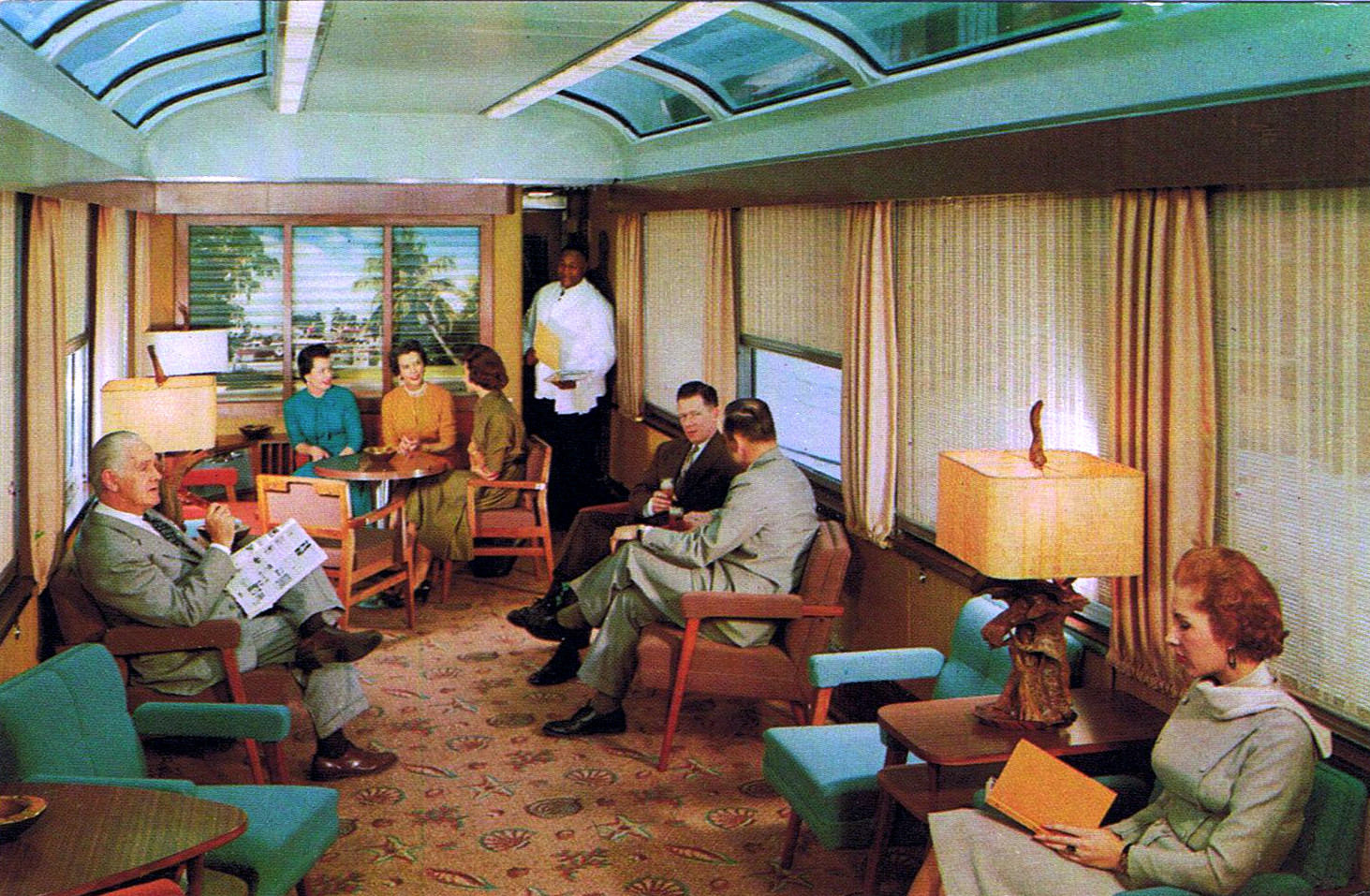
A postcard view of the bar lounge in one of Seaboard's unique, glass-roofed "Sun Lounge" cars built in 1955. Regular high-topped dome cars used on other railroads were too tall for the low clearances on the Northeast Corridor used by SAL trains north of Washington.

The SAL had a cooperative relationship with the Southern Railway for traffic to the western part of the upper South and the Midwest. For example, the Southern's timetables listed SAL routes for train destinations south of Jacksonville Union Station, the gateway hub for trains from the Midwest and the Northeast to Florida destinations, examples being the Southern's Kansas City-Florida Special, Ponce de Leon and Royal Palm. Additionally, the Southern and the SAL railroads pooled their operations for the Florida Sunbeam, a wintertime train from Detroit and Cleveland to Florida.

Following is a partial list of the many named passenger trains that Seaboard operated during the first half of the 20th century, some of which were continued by successors Seaboard Coast Line (SCL) and Amtrak. Trains originating in New York were handled by the Pennsylvania Railroad from New York to Washington; by the Richmond, Fredericksburg and Potomac Railroad from Washington to Richmond; and by Seaboard from Richmond to points south.

Prior to the completion of Seaboard's Cross-Florida extension from Coleman to West Palm Beach (1925) and on to Miami (1926), the Florida East Coast Railway handled SAL trains from Jacksonville to Miami. Thereafter, Seaboard split most major southbound trains at Wildwood, just north of Coleman, with one section going to Tampa and west coast points, and the other going to Miami. Northbound, the process was reversed, with west and east coast sections joining at Wildwood to continue their journey.

=== Heavyweight trains ===
The term heavyweight refers to trains consisting of passenger cars with all-steel construction, considered a great improvement in safety over the all-wooden or wood-and-steel cars of the 19th century. By 1910, nearly all major railroads were replacing their wooden passenger fleets with cars of heavyweight construction.

Note: The history of train names on various Seaboard routes is complex, with some being temporarily replaced or discontinued for a year or two, then brought back, perhaps on a somewhat different routing (e.g., to both coasts of Florida or to only one); the following is merely a rough guide to the names of some of the major year-round trains Seaboard offered. Consult sources listed at the end of this article for exact details.

Before the Cross-Florida Extension from Coleman to West Palm Beach was completed in 1925 (and extended to Miami in 1927), Seaboard trains for cities on the Atlantic side of Florida were handled by the Florida East Coast Railway south of Jacksonville.

==== Pre World War II ====
- Florida and Metropolitan Limited, inaugurated January 14, 1901

Heavyweight winter-season only (December – April), all-Pullman, New York to both coasts of Florida; on January 1, 1903, renamed the Seaboard Florida Limited in winter (all first-class cars) and Seaboard Florida Express in summer; in 1930, replaced by the New York-Florida Limited, carrying coaches and Pullmans; on December 12, 1941, it was renamed the Palmland.

- Atlanta Special, inaugurated 1901

Heavyweight coaches and Pullmans. Originally a connecting train from the main-line junction of Hamlet, North Carolina, to Atlanta, in the early 1920s it began operating as a through service from Washington to Birmingham. It was renamed the Seaboard Express on April 12, 1903, later the Atlanta-Birmingham Special in 1911. With the addition of air-conditioned cars on April 28, 1935, it was renamed the Robert E. Lee and on May 18, 1947, the Cotton Blossom.

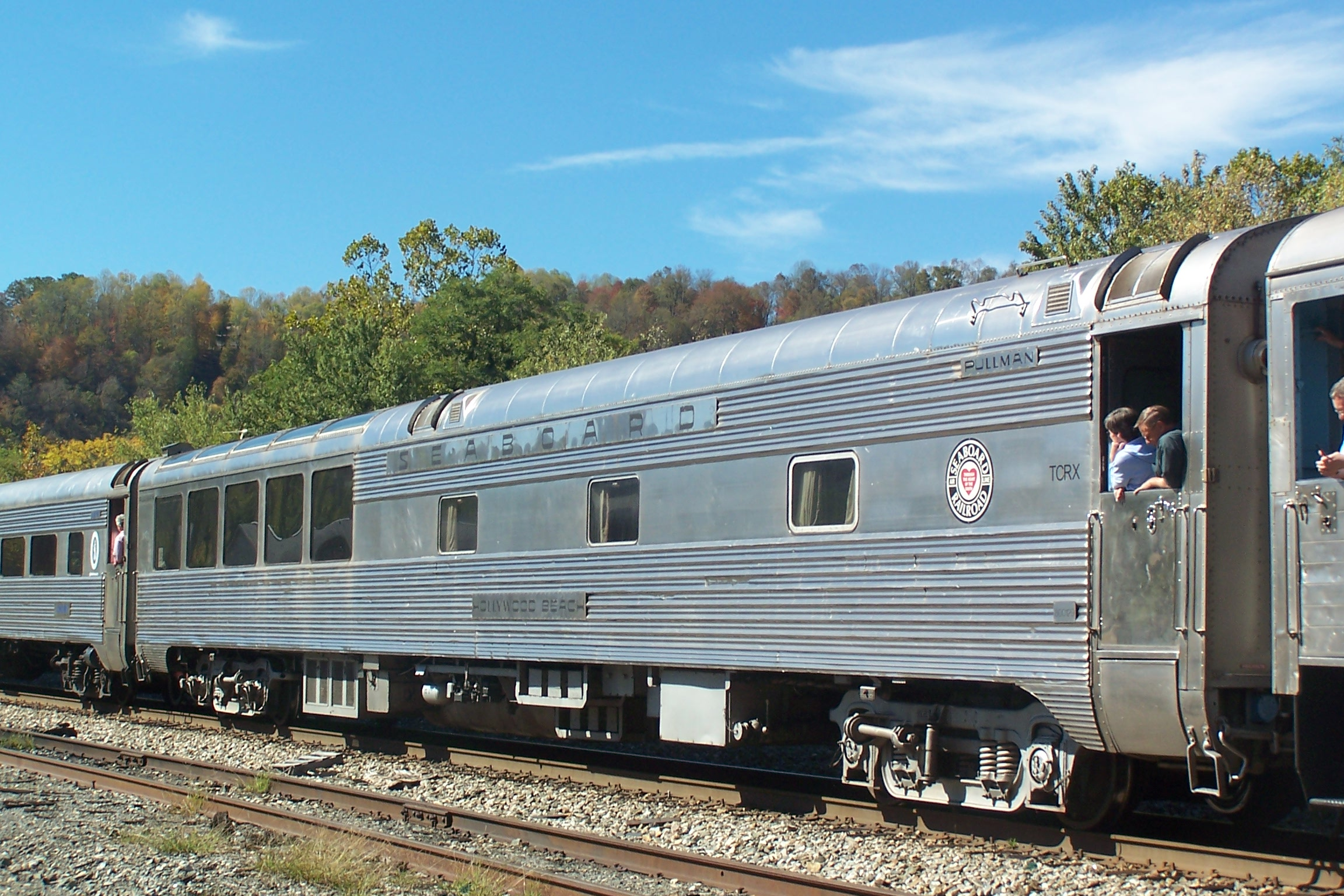
Exterior view in 2007 of the 5-double-bedroom-buffet Sun Lounge car Hollywood Beach, now privately owned.

- Suwanee River Special, inaugurated November 8, 1921

Heavyweight coaches and Pullmans. This train carried passengers from Cincinnati and other Midwest points to the Gulf Coast resort cities of Tampa, St. Petersburg, Venice, and Naples. Handled by Southern Railway (U.S.) from Cincinnati via Atlanta to a connection with the Seaboard at Hampton, Florida. North of Cincinnati, Pullmans handled by other railroads provided through sleeping-car service to and from Chicago, Detroit, and Cleveland.

- New Orleans-Florida Limited, November 1924 – July 1949

Heavyweight coaches and Pullmans. From 1924 to 1929, this train carried the first and only transcontinental sleeping car in the United States, a Pullman from Jacksonville to Los Angeles via a connection with the Southern Pacific Railroad's Sunset Limited at New Orleans. Superseded by the streamlined Gulf Wind (see below).

- Cross Florida Day Service, Cross Florida Night Service, 1925-early 1960s

began with a 1925 predecessor (Cross Florida Night Limited); 1930 – early 1960s St. Petersburg – Miami; day service: bus: St. Petersburg – West Lake Wales, train: West Lake Wales – Miami; night service: coaches: St. Petersburg-Tampa, Tampa-West Lake Wales, West Lake Wales-Miami, sleepers: Tampa-Miami

- Orange Blossom Special, November 21, 1925 – April 26, 1953; due to wartime restrictions, did not run in the years 1942–1945.

Heavyweight, winter-season only, all-Pullman, New York to Tampa/St. Petersburg, and West Palm Beach, later to Miami as well. The most luxurious SAL train of its time, introduced to entice wealthy tourists and businessmen to Florida during the land-boom era, its deluxe features included fresh flowers and fresh fish for the dining car, a library car and observation car, and a club car with a barber and shower bath. The OBS was later immortalized in a very famous fiddle tune of the same name.

- Southern States Special, inaugurated May 5, 1929

Heavyweight coaches and Pullmans, New York to Florida; renamed the Sun Queen on December 12, 1941; renamed the Camellia on May 18, 1947; renamed Sunland on August 1, 1948.

==== Post World War II ====
- Cotton Blossom, May 18, 1947 – April 24, 1955

All-coach, New York – Birmingham via Athens, Georgia and Atlanta. Name dropped on April 24, 1955, though the Cotton Blossom's numbers and timetable were still used by a "Passenger, Mail & Express" until the late 1968.

- Gulf Wind, July 31, 1949 – April 30, 1971

Heavyweight coach cars and lightweight Pullman cars, Jacksonville – New Orleans via Tallahassee, Pensacola and Mobile. Handled jointly by SAL and the Louisville and Nashville Railroad, with motive power changed at Chattahoochee.

- Palmland, December 12, 1941 – April 30, 1971

Heavyweight coach cars and lightweight Pullman cars, New York – St.Petersburg/Miami. The route was cut back to Columbia, South Carolina as the southern terminus by Seaboard Coast Line by in 1968, and the train was not continued by Amtrak in 1971.

- Sunland, August 1, 1948 – December 1968

Coach and Pullman cars, New York – Tampa/Miami. Connections in Washington to New York and Boston. Connections in Washington to New York and Boston. The route was cut back to Jacksonville, Florida as the southern terminus by Seaboard Coast Line in February 1968, and later discontinued in December.

=== Streamliners ===
Although competing railroads in the South were reluctant to make the capital investments needed to streamline their passenger car fleets, Seaboard began to streamline in 1939, and soon the other railroads began to follow. Two of the routes, the Silver Meteor and the Silver Star, are still operating today; they are the sole survivors of the once-vast market of long-distance Florida trains. The Silver Meteor, Silver Star, and Silver Comet constituted Seaboard's advertised "Silver Fleet" of streamliners, with lightweight fluted-side stainless steel cars pulled by EMD diesel locomotives.

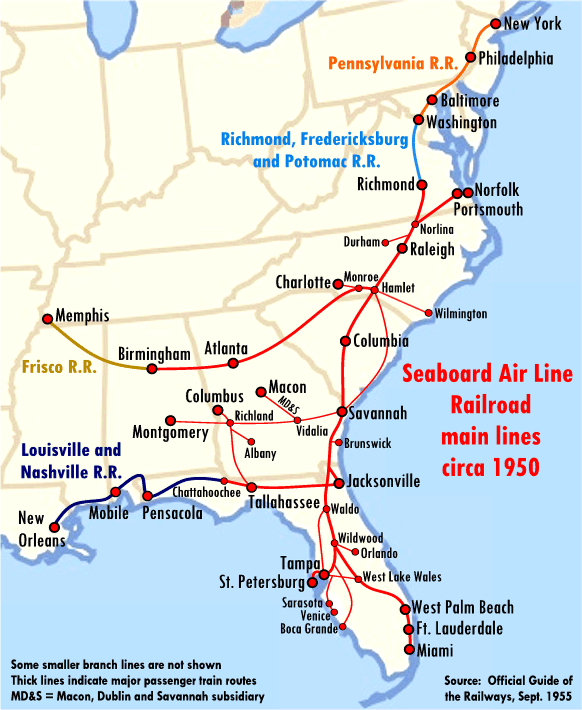
Main routes of the Seaboard in the early postwar era, showing through passenger service handled by other railroads to offline destinations.

- Silver Meteor, inaugurated February 2, 1939

Initially an all-coach train (Pullman sleepers added in 1941), first streamliner to serve Florida, New York to Tampa/St. Petersburg and Miami. Trains continued beyond Tampa to Sarasota and Venice. Preserving its reputation as "one of the finest [trains] in the country," the train retained its round-ended observation cars until Amtrak took over operation in 1971. Still in Amtrak service today with updated equipment.

- Silver Star, inaugurated December 12, 1947

Streamliner, coach and Pullman cars, New York to Tampa/St. Petersburg and Miami. Still in Amtrak service with updated equipment, though currently temporarily discontinued.

- Silver Comet, May 18, 1947 – October 15, 1969

Streamliner, coach and Pullman cars, New York – Birmingham via Athens and Atlanta. The train was cut back to Washington – Atlanta only by January 1969, then to Richmond – Atlanta only by May, and finally discontinued October 15, 1969.

- Tidewater, November 1, 1953 – February 1968

Streamliner, coach and Pullman cars, Portsmouth, Virginia – Jacksonville, Florida, forwarding cars to the Silver Comet at Hamlet, North Carolina. Ferries would transport passengers between Norfolk and Portsmouth. Coach only by 1968.

=== Significant firsts ===
As the underdog in its competition with the wealthier Atlantic Coast Line, Seaboard often strove to bolster its passenger revenues by offering innovative services. Seaboard was the first Florida railroad to:

- Operate air-conditioned Pullmans (1933);
- Install reclining seats in coaches (1936);
- Dieselize its passenger trains (1938); and
- Offer streamlined trains between New York and Florida (1939).

== Freight trains ==
In the mid-20th century Seaboard was one of a few railroads that gave names to its main freight trains. Among these were:

- Merchandiser, Richmond to Miami
- Marketer, Miami to Richmond and Tampa to Richmond (joined into one train at Baldwin, Florida)
- Tar Heel, train #89, Richmond to Bostic, North Carolina
- The Capital, train #27, Richmond to Birmingham
- Iron Master, Birmingham to Atlanta
- Alaga, Montgomery to Savannah
- Pioneer, Montgomery to Jacksonville
- Razorback, train # 96 & # 95, Charlotte, N.C. to Monroe, N.C. and return.

Seaboard also had a number of fast, high-priority freight trains called Red Ball freights between various points on its system.

In 1959 Seaboard inaugurated its high-speed piggyback service. The best of these trailer-on-flatcar (TOFC) trains was the Razorback, trains TT23 and TT24, running between Kearny, New Jersey on the Pennsylvania Railroad and Hialeah Yard, Miami, covering a distance of over 1,000 miles in less than 30 hours.

== Seaboard Airline Railway Free Traveling Library System ==
In the late 1890s, Georgia educator and activist Sarah Harper Heard met with and persuaded the vice president and general manager of Seaboard Air Line Railroad, Everett St. John, to have the company transport books to every railroad stop; these small libraries came to be called "S.A.L. Magundi Clubs". St. John went on to contact Andrew Carnegie, who donated $1,000 towards the effort. Thus began in 1898 the Seaboard Airline Railway Free Traveling Library System; due to his support, Heard sometimes referred to the program as the "Andrew Carnegie Free Traveling Library".

Heard also traveled to New York City, where she met with book editors and publishing houses to establish business agreements and request donations, and then back to Georgia via the Eastern seaboard, recruiting librarians across six states along the way. Her overall efforts were so successful that the New York Daily Tribune noted that the donations "enabled [Heard] to send the boxes in all directions. Quantities of books have been given and the rooms at Rose Hill, which were used as a distributing headquarters, are now overcrowded". By the turn of the century, the Seaboard library system boasted a collection of over 2,500 books and attracted so much support that it was able to donate entire libraries to deserving schools. Heard was named Seaboard's Superintendent [of] Traveling Libraries in 1901. By 1910, books were being circulated from Rose Hill to 35 community libraries and 150 school libraries; by 1912, the Seaboard library system comprised 18,000 books and 38,000 magazines. A number of publications came from the United States Department of Agriculture.

In a 1901 special edition titled "Free Traveling Libraries", Seaboard's promotional magazine S.A.L. Magundi published an assortment of letters written by notable figures including President William McKinley, the governor of Alabama, Florida governor William Sherman Jennings, Georgia governor Allen D. Candler, North Carolina governor Charles Brantley Aycock, South Carolina governor Miles Benjamin McSweeney, Virginia governor James Hoge Tyler, and Andrew Carnegie.

Heard worked to establish twelve "McKinley libraries" in 1902, dedicated to "the characteristics and high ideals so exemplified in the life and purposes of [President William] McKinley". The traveling library system won a gold medal award at the 1907 Jamestown Exposition in Virginia.

Heard died in 1919, after which her daughter Susan took over management as head librarian until her death on April 7, 1934; Susan's husband James Y. Swift then filled the role.

Seaboard continued to transport books to small towns and libraries in need across the region until 1955, leaving behind new libraries scattered among small communities across the Southeast. The library system never charged fees for late or lost books. Its collection of books was donated to schools across Georgia.

== See also ==
- List of Seaboard Air Line Railroad precursors
- List of railroads of the Confederate States of America
- Atlantic Coast Line Railroad
- Seaboard Coast Line Railroad
- Orange Blossom Special
- Silver Meteor
- Silver Star (Amtrak train)
- Silver Comet (train)
- Gulf Wind

== Bibliography ==
- Calloway, Warren L., and Withers, Paul K. Seaboard Air Line Railroad Company Motive Power. Withers Publishing, 1988 ISBN 0-9618503-1-0.
- Goolsby Larry, "Seaboard Air Line Passenger Service, The Streamlined Era." TLC Publishing, 2011 ISBN 9780939487981
- Griffin, William E Jr. "Seaboard Air Line Railroad, The Route of Courteous Service." TLC Publishing, 1999 ISBN 1-883089-44-1.
- Johnson, Robert Wayne. Through the Heart of the South: The Seaboard Air Line Railroad Story. Boston Mills Press, 1995 ISBN 1-55046-144-3.
- McIver, Stuart B. (1994). Dreamers, Schemers and Scalawags. Pineapple Press, Inc. ISBN 978-1-56164-034-8.
- Prince, Richard E. (2000) [1966]. Seaboard Air Line Railway: Steam Boats, Locomotives, and History. Indiana University Press. ISBN 978-0-253-33695-8. Reprint of 1966 edition. The classic, authoritative history of the company, thickly detailed and profusely illustrated.
- Schafer, Mike (2000). More Classic American Railroads. Osceola, Wisconsin: MBI Publishing Co. ISBN 978-0-7603-0758-8.
- Solomon, Brian. CSX. MBI Publishing Company, (SAL history is summarized on pp. 32–34.) 1995 ISBN 0-7603-1796-8.
- Starr, Timothy (2024). The Back Shop Illustrated, Volume 3: Southeast and Western Regions. Privately printed.
- Turner, Gregg M. " Railroads of Southwest Florida." Arcadia Publishing. 1999 ISBN 0-7385-0349-5
- Turner, Gregg. "A Short History of Florida Railroads" Arcadia Publishing. 2003 ISBN 0-7385-2421-2
- Turner, Gregg M. "A Journey into Florida Railroad History" University Press of Florida. 2008. ISBN 978-0-8130-3233-7
- Welsh, Joseph M. By Streamliner: New York to Florida. Andover Junction Publications, 1994. ISBN 978-0-944119-14-3.
