= Homestead Subdivision =

Railroad in South Florida

The Homestead Subdivision is a CSX railroad line in South Florida. Running from a junction with the South Florida Rail Corridor in Hialeah near Miami International Airport south to Homestead, the line is the southernmost railroad line in the continental United States. The Homestead Subdivision was built in 1927 by the Seaboard Air Line Railroad.

== Route description ==
The Homestead Subdivision begins just east of Miami International Airport. It branches off the South Florida Rail Corridor (which primarily serves Tri-Rail commuter trains) just south of the Miami Canal. From here, it quickly turns south, running along the Tamiami Canal to the south side of the airport. It then turns west along the south side of the airport, paralleling Runway 9/27 before coming to Oleander Junction.

At Oleander Junction, the Homestead Subdivision turns south while the Lehigh Spur continues west to Doral and Sweetwater. The south end of the Florida East Coast Railway’s Little River Branch also connects to the Homestead Subdivision at Oleander Junction.

Continuing south from Oleander Junction, the Homestead Subdivision continues south through Coral Terrace before turning southwest through Glenvar Heights. From Glenvar Heights southwest through Kendall, the Homestead Subdivision runs directly beside the Don Shula Expressway. Just southwest of Kendall, the line comes to a point historically known as Sterling. At Sterling Junction, the GPC Spur branches off the line and heads west to Cemex’s Krome Quarry on Krome Avenue.

Just south of Sterling Junction, the Homestead Subdivision passes the Gold Coast Railroad Museum and continues southwest another eight miles before turning south into Homestead. After entering Homestead, the Homestead Subdivision terminates at a wye just south of the Homestead Seaboard Air Line Railway Station.

== Operation ==
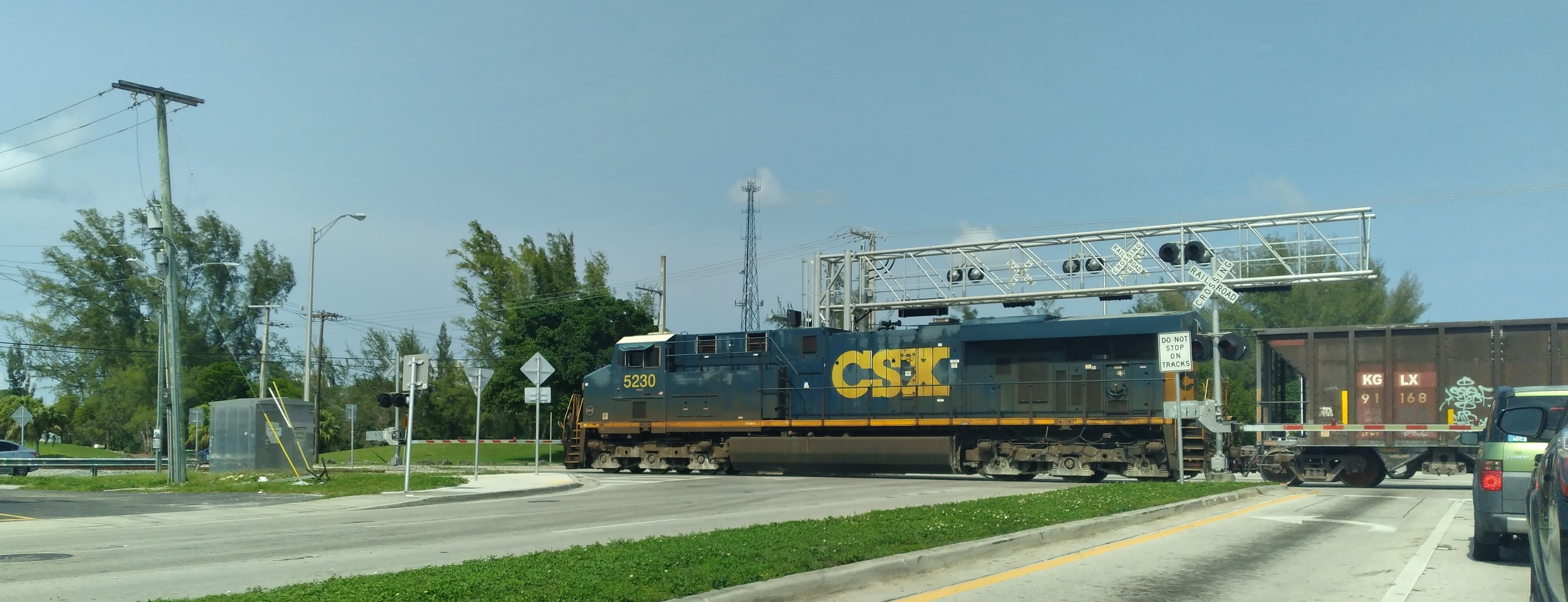
Freight train on the line crossing Bird Road

The Homestead Subdivision is used for local freight. The line's milepost numbers continue from the South Florida Rail Corridor, though the numbers have been subtracted from 1000 from their original numbering for simplicity.

CSX serves the Cemex Miami Cement Plant on NW 137th Ave in Doral on the Lehigh Spur. The GPC Spur serves Cemex's Krome Quarry in western Miami-Dade County as well as a Conrad Yelvington plant.

The southernmost 12 miles of the line (south of the Gold Coast Railroad Museum) are currently out of service.

== History ==
Homestead Subdivision

Overview
- Status: Portions still operating under successor company
- Owner: Seaboard Air Line Railroad
- Termini: Hialeah, Florida; Homestead, Florida

History
- Opened: 1927

Technical
- Track gauge: 1,435 mm (4 ft 8 1/2 in) standard gauge
- Electrification: No
- Signalling: None
Route map
Route of the Homestead Subdivision when first built (red). The realigned segment around Miami International Airport is shown in dark red.

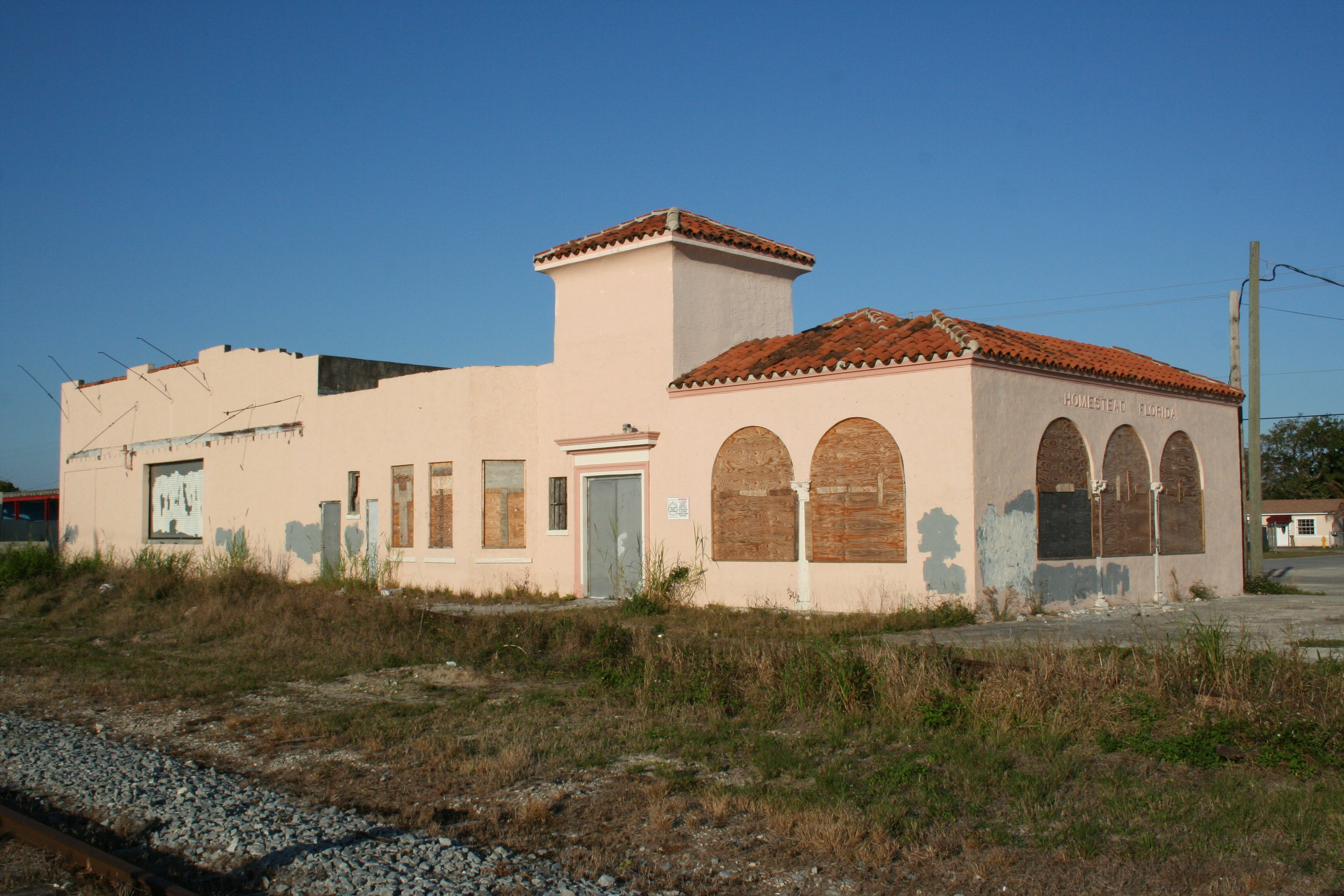
Abandoned Homestead Seaboard passenger station at the end of the Homestead Subdivision

The Homestead Subdivision was originally built in 1927 by the Seaboard Air Line Railroad. It was a southern extension of the company's Miami Subdivision, which had been completed a year prior. It was the second railroad line to run south of Miami after the Florida East Coast Railway, which was extended to Homestead in the early 1900s and led to their Key West extension. The Homestead Subdivision largely paralleled the Florida East Coast Railway between Kendall and Homestead. The Seaboard Air Line discontinued passenger service on the Homestead Subdivision in 1929, the same year as the Wall Street Crash of 1929.

When first built, the north end Homestead Subdivision ran though the middle of what is now Miami International Airport. The Seaboard Air Line's Hialeah yard was located at the east end of the current Runway 8R/26L at the time. The airport was actually built as two separate air fields on either side of the tracks, with Miami Army Airfield to the south and Pan American Field (later known as the 36th Street Airport) to the north. In 1949, the Dade County Port Authority merged the two air fields, which was officially named Miami International Airport. After the fields were merged, the railroad still ran through the middle of the airport. The tracks even crossed a runway and taxiway at grade and trains needed clearance from air traffic control to cross them. In 1951, The Dade County Port Authority paid $3 million to relocate Seaboard's yard further north and to realign the Homestead Subdivision between LeJeune Road and Oleander Junction to its current route on the south of the airport.

The Lehigh and GPC Spurs were built in 1958 to serve two large cement plants that were built just west of Miami. The Lehigh Spur served the plant built by the Lehigh Portland Cement Company and the GPC Spur another plant built by the General Portland Cement Company (GPC) at Krome Avenue and Kendall Drive.

In 1967, the Seaboard Air Line Railroad became the Seaboard Coast Line Railroad after merging with its rival, the Atlantic Coast Line Railroad. In 1980, the Seaboard Coast Line's parent company merged with the Chessie System, creating the CSX Corporation. The CSX Corporation initially operated the Chessie and Seaboard Systems separately until 1986, when they were merged into CSX Transportation.

After the abandonment of the adjacent Florida East Coast Railway main line through Florida City in 1989, the Homestead Subdivision became the southernmost railroad track in the continental United States.

In the 2000s, CSX realigned the Lehigh Spur's connection at Oleander Junction allowing for trains to run directly into the spur from the north. Trains previously had to go south of the junction and reverse into the spur.

In March 2019, CSX officially classified the southernmost 12 miles of the Homestead Subdivision as out of service.

== Possible commuter rail service ==
There have been proposals in the past to extend Tri-Rail commuter service down the line to Homestead. The most recent proposal was in 2023, but the idea has never made it past the proposal stage.

== Historic Seaboard Air Line stations ==
Milepost	City	Station	Connections and notes
SX 1037.2		Hialeah Junction	junction with Miami Subdivision
SXH 1041.1		Oleander	junction with: Lehigh Spur; Florida East Coast Railway Little River Branch
SXH 1043.3	Coral Gables	Coral Gables	
SXH 1047.0	South Miami	South Miami	
SXH 1053.0		Sterling	junction with GPC Spur
SXH 1055.5	Richmond West	Richmond	
SXH 1058.7		Aladdin City	
SXH 1062.8		Redland	
SXH 1066.4	Homestead	Homestead	

== See also ==
- List of CSX Transportation lines
- Miami Subdivision
