= Naples station =

- Naples Seaboard Air Line Railway Station
- U.S. National Register of Historic Places
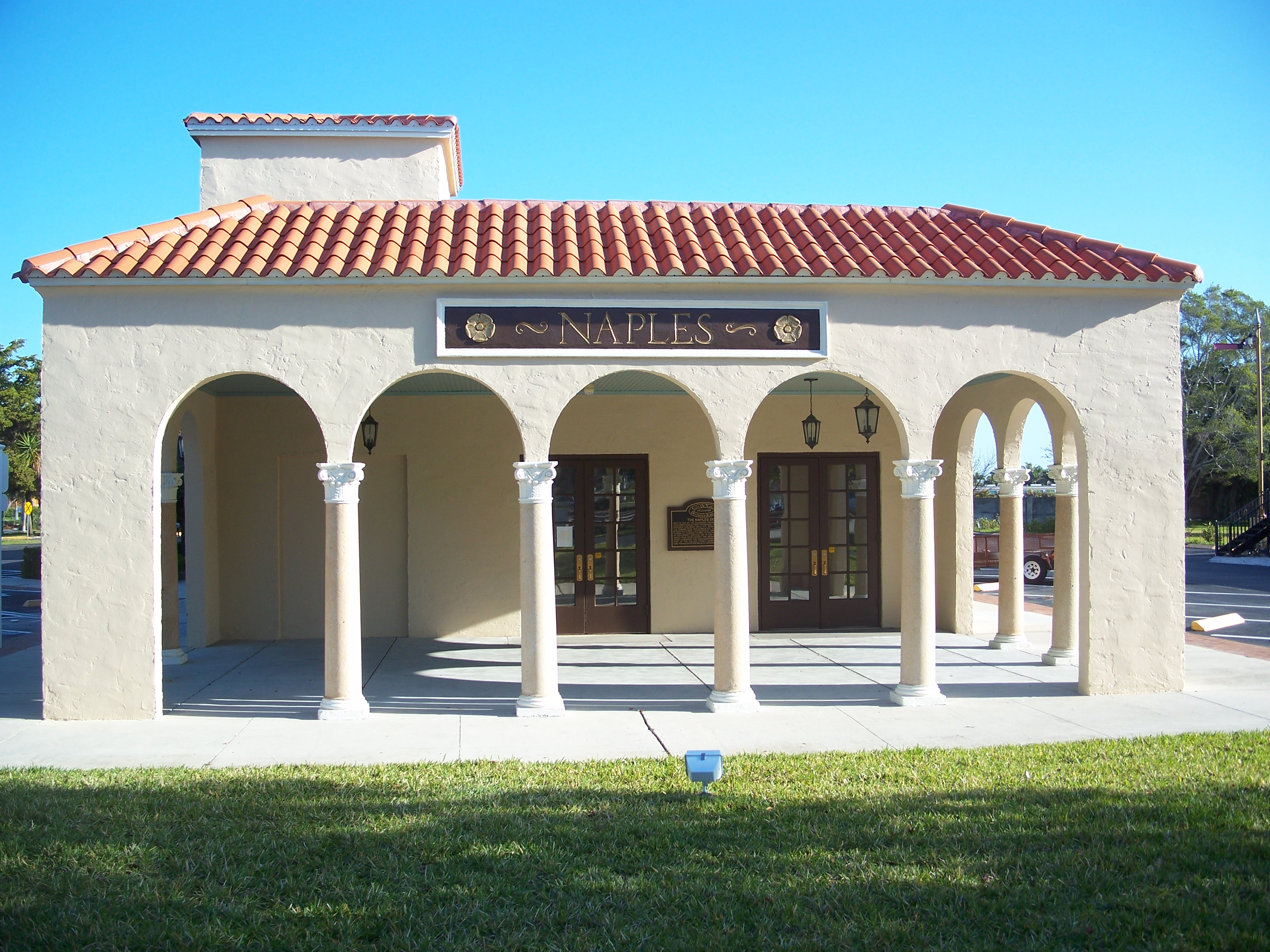

- Location within Florida Location within the United States
- Location: Naples, Florida
- Coordinates: 26°08′34″N 81°47′35″W
- Area: 7 acres (2.8 ha)
- Built: 1926
- Architect: L. Philips Clarke
- NRHP reference No.: 74000613
- Added to NRHP: September 10, 1974

The Naples Seaboard Air Line Railway Station (also known as the Naples Railroad Depot or Seaboard Coast Line Railroad Depot) is a historic Seaboard Air Line Railway depot in Naples, Florida. It is located at 1051 5th Avenue, South.

== History ==
The depot was constructed in 1927, when the Seaboard Air Line Railroad constructed its line to Naples. It was designed in the same Mediterranean Revival style the Seaboard Air Line used with its stations in Delray Beach, Deerfield Beach, Hialeah, and Homestead on the southeast coast of Florida (which were built around the same time), and is virtually identical to the Hialeah depot. The station only briefly saw Seaboard Air Line passenger service in the late 1920s before the railroad reduced its line to Naples to freight service only in 1933. Seaboard ended freight service in the 1940s. During World War II, the depot was also home to USO shows for troops stationed at the nearby Naples airfield.

By 1944, the Atlantic Coast Line Railroad bought both the depot and the Seaboard tracks to Naples after Seaboard discontinued service. The Atlantic Coast Line connected the former Seaboard track to their Fort Myers Southern Branch near Vanderbilt Beach, and resumed passenger service to the depot after an eleven-year absence. This makes it only one of the few railroad depots to have been operated by both the Atlantic Coast Line and the Seaboard Air Line independently prior to their merger. The Atlantic Coast Line's previous depot in Naples was located at the northeast corner of Radio Road and Airport-Pulling Road near Naples Airport, which was then closed and eventually demolished in 1981.

Ironically, the Seaboard brand returned to the depot in 1967 when the Atlantic Coast Line merged with the Seaboard Air Line which became the Seaboard Coast Line Railroad. Passenger service ended in 1971 when national passenger rail was taken over by Amtrak. On September 10, 1974, the depot was added to the U.S. National Register of Historic Places. Freight service was halted for good in the late 1970s, and the adjacent tracks were removed in 1980 (the remaining line from this point north is still in place and is now owned by Seminole Gulf Railway).

== Naples Depot Museum ==
The station has since been fully restored by the Collier County Museums, and is now operated as the Naples Depot Museum. Exhibits focus on the history of transportation and trade in Southwest Florida. Displays include railroads, Seminole dugout canoes, a mule wagon and an antique swamp buggy. Vintage railcars are also on display outside of the building. In another part of the building is a Lionel Train Museum which is dedicated to model trains. A miniature railway also runs around the perimeter of the property.

| Preceding station | Seaboard Air Line Railroad | Following station |
|---|---|---|
| Vanderbilt toward Hull | Hull – Naples | Terminus |
| Preceding station | Atlantic Coast Line Railroad | Following station |
| Bonita Springs toward Lakeland | Lakeland – Marco Island after 1944 | Belle Meade toward Marco Island |
