= Hi-Level =

Class of American bilevel railroad passenger cars

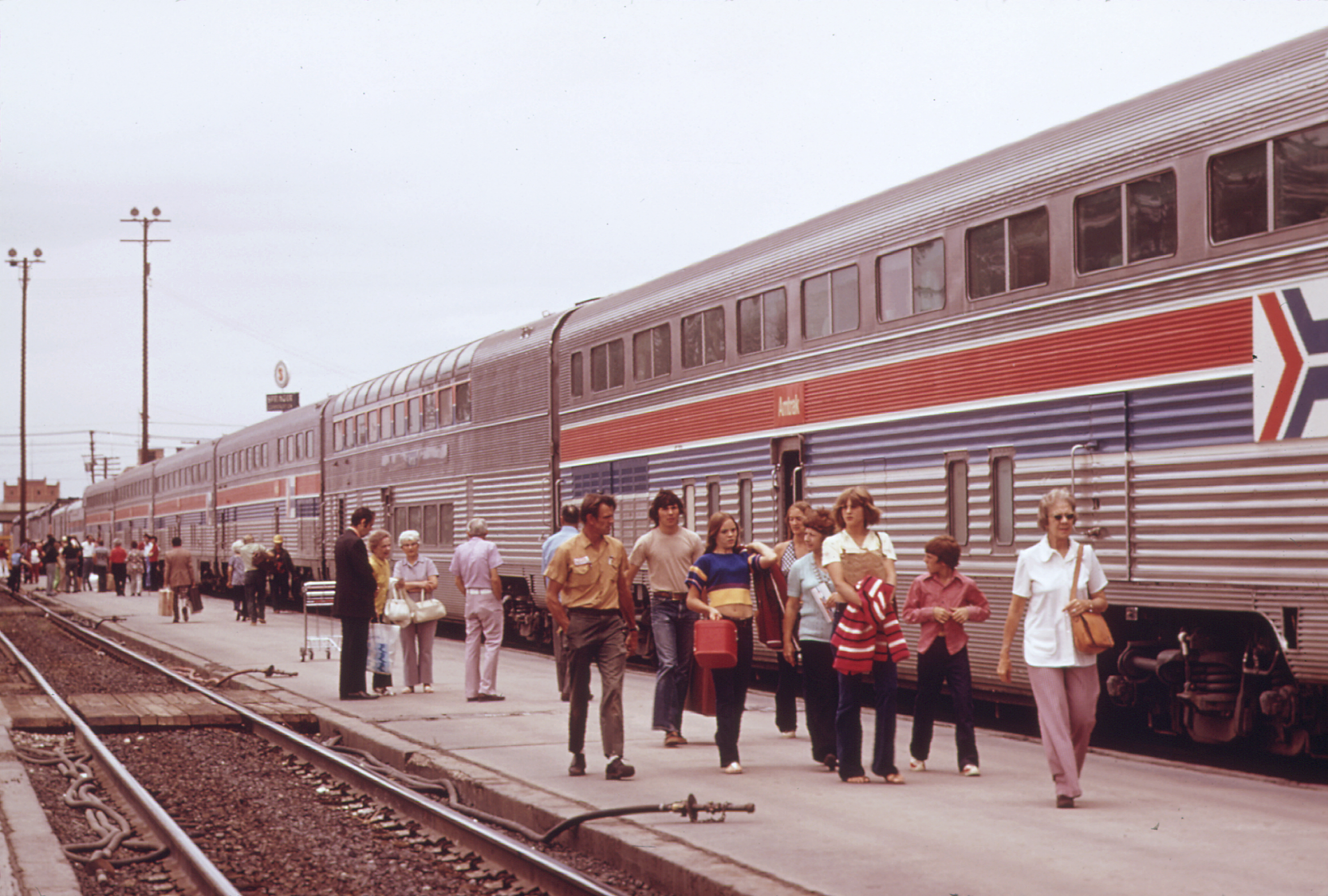
- Hi-Level coaches on Amtrak's Southwest Limited at Albuquerque in 1974; the lounge is second from right.

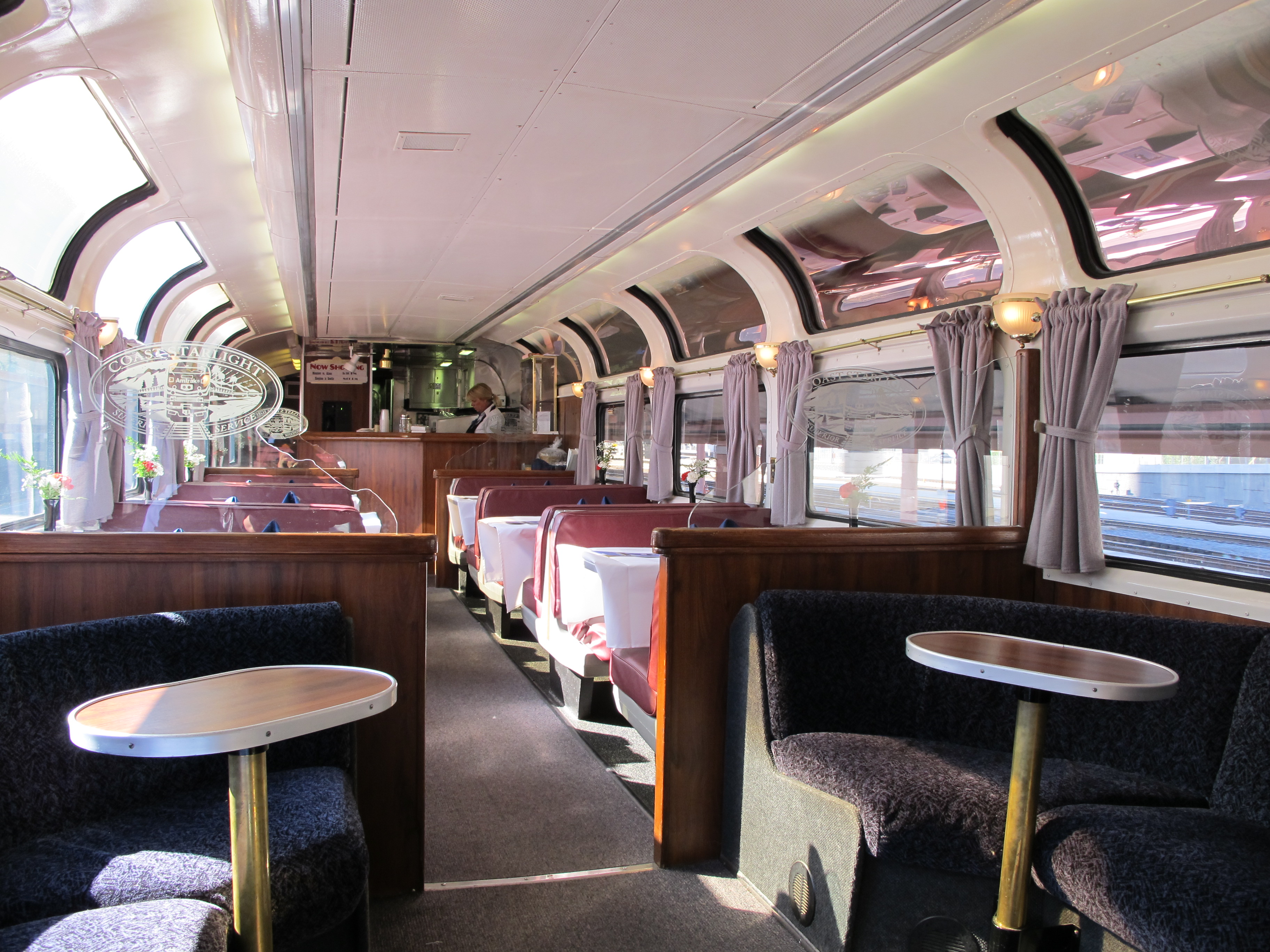
- The interior of an Amtrak Pacific Parlour Car, a refurbished lounge
- In service: 1954–2018
- Manufacturer: Budd Company
- Constructed: 1952–1964
- Number built: 73 (61 coaches, 6 lounges, 6 diners)
- Number preserved: Various in private ownership
- Capacity: 67 (coach prototypes); 68 (step-down coaches); 72 (coaches)
- Operators: Atchison, Topeka and Santa Fe Railway; Amtrak

Specifications
- Car body construction: Stainless steel
- Car length: 85 feet (26 m)
- Height: 15 feet 6 inches (4.72 m)
- Weight: 80 short tons (73 t) (coaches); 83 short tons (75 t) (lounges); 97 short tons (88 t) (dining cars)

The Hi-Level was a type of bilevel intercity railroad passenger car used in the United States. Car types included coaches, dining cars, and lounge cars; a sleeping car variant was considered but never produced. Most passenger spaces were on the upper level, which featured a row of windows on both sides. Boarding was on the lower level; passengers climbed up a center stairwell to reach the upper level. Vestibules on the upper level permitted passengers to walk between cars; some coaches had an additional stairwell at one end to allow access to single-level equipment.

The Budd Company designed the car in the 1950s for the Atchison, Topeka and Santa Fe Railway ("Santa Fe") for use on the El Capitan, a coach-only streamliner which ran daily between Los Angeles and Chicago. The design was inspired by two recent developments in railroading: the dome car, employed in intercity routes in the western United States, and bilevel commuter cars operating in the Chicago area. Budd built 73 Hi-Level cars between 1952 and 1964.

The first two prototype coaches entered service on the El Capitan in 1954 and were immediately successful. Budd built sufficient coaches, dining cars, and lounge cars to fully equip the El Capitan, with additional coaches seeing use on the San Francisco Chief. Amtrak inherited the entire fleet in 1971 and continued to use the equipment on its western routes. Tunnel clearances restricted their use in the eastern United States. In 1979, the first Superliners, based on the Hi-Level concept although built by Pullman-Standard, entered service. Amtrak gradually retired most of its Hi-Levels in the 1990s as more Superliners became available. Five lounges, dubbed "Pacific Parlour Cars", provided first-class lounge service on the Coast Starlight until their retirement in 2018. Several cars have been acquired by heritage railroads for excursion use.

== Background ==
The Santa Fe introduced the El Capitan in 1938. The train ran on the Santa Fe's main line between Chicago and Los Angeles. Like other streamliners of the pre-war period, the El Capitan carried coaches only, and had no sleeping cars; this was meant to provide passengers with a lower-cost alternative to the sleeping car-equipped Super Chief, which served the same route. Passengers flocked to the new train, and the Santa Fe added cars to meet the demand. The train grew from five cars in 1938 to twelve in 1942. By the early 1950s fourteen was common. Only seven or eight of these would be passenger-carrying coaches; other cars included head-end cars, a baggage-dormitory for the crew, two dining cars, and a Big Dome lounge.

Sometimes demand was high enough to justify running a second instance ("section") of the train on the same day. The Santa Fe sought a solution to increase the capacity of the train without lengthening it further. Two popular innovations by the Chicago, Burlington and Quincy Railroad (CB&Q) suggested a solution. First, in 1945, the CB&Q introduced the dome car, in which passengers rode on a second level high above the tracks, affording better views. Second, in 1950, it placed bilevel rail cars in commuter service in the Chicago area. Taken together, these innovations suggested a new possibility: a long-distance bilevel coach, with greater capacity than single-level cars, and the panoramic views of a dome.

== History ==
=== Santa Fe ===
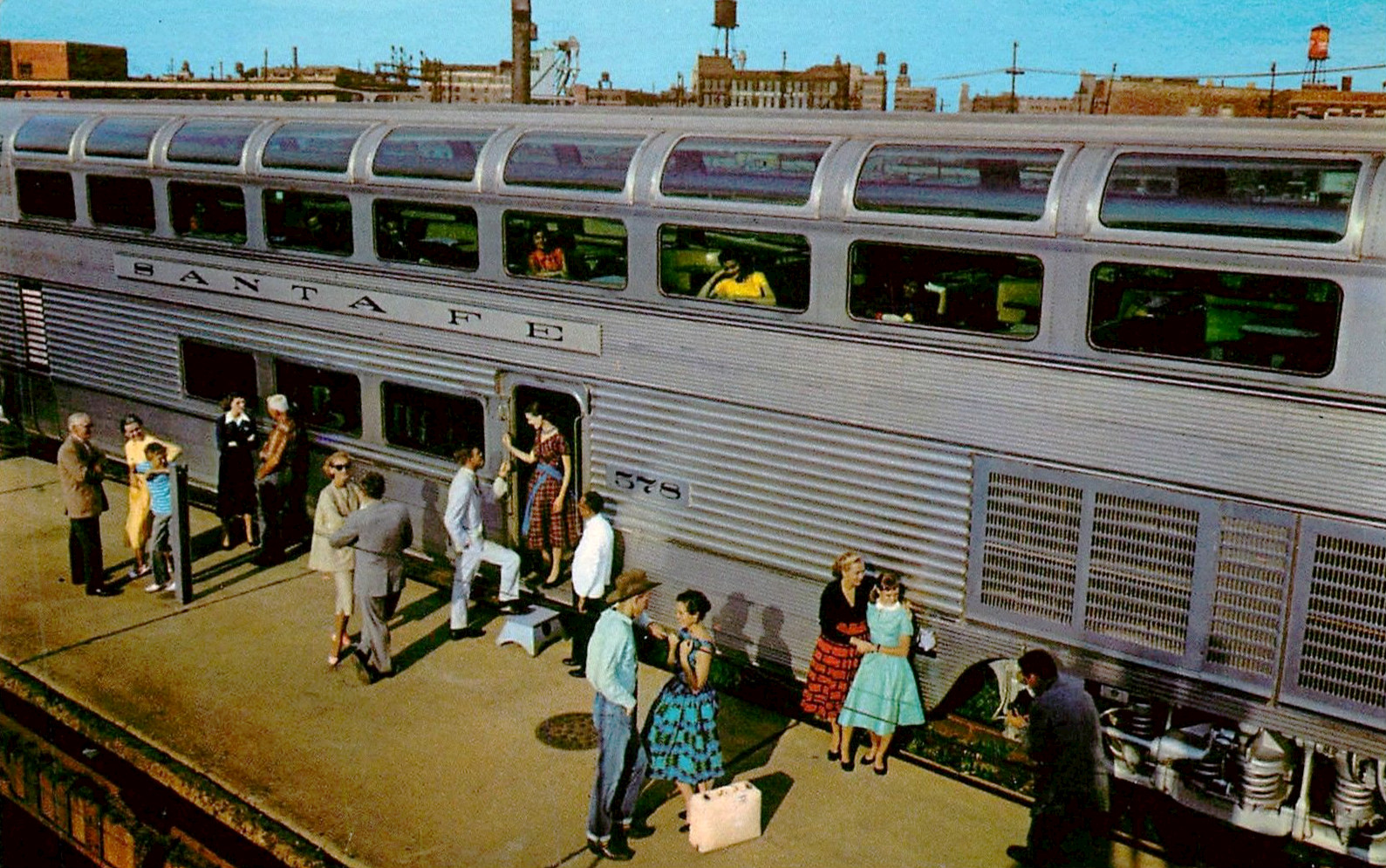
The exterior of a Hi-Level lounge on the El Capitan soon after completion in 1956

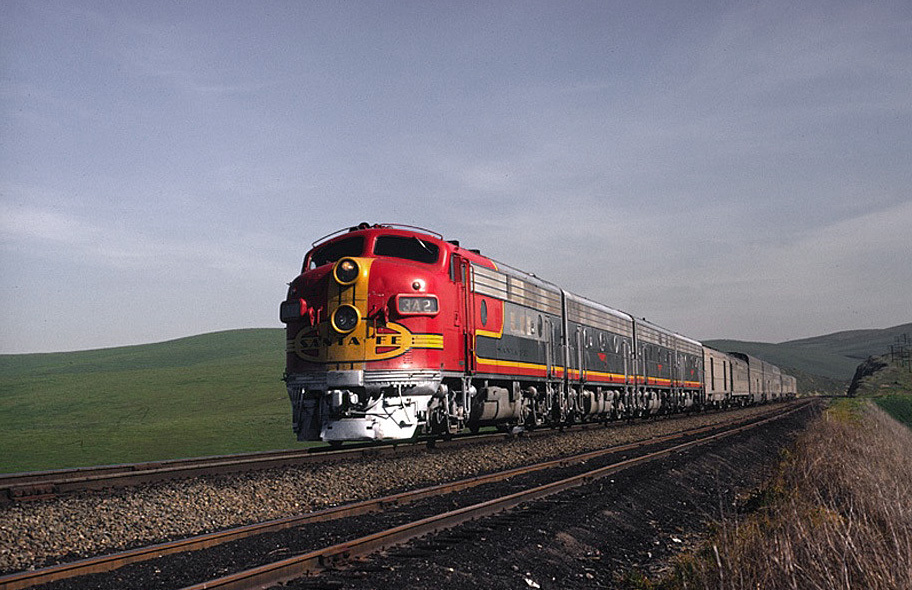
The San Francisco Chief in 1971. The train had both Hi-Level and single-level cars.

The Budd Company approached Santa Fe in 1952 with the proposal to build long-distance bilevel cars, building on the gallery commuter car concept. Santa Fe accepted the proposal, and took delivery of two prototype coaches in 1954. The cars went into regular service on the El Capitan. Following a positive customer response, the Santa Fe ordered 47 more cars: ten 68-seat "step down" coaches, twenty-five 72-seat coaches, six lounges, and six dining cars. These constituted five equipment sets ("consists"), sufficient for daily service on the El Capitan. The project cost $13 million.

A press trip took place between Washington, D.C., and Pittsburgh on June 16, 1956, using the route of the Baltimore and Ohio Railroad (and presaging the use of Superliners on Amtrak's Capitol Limited). Santa Fe exhibited the equipment throughout the United States during June and early July. A formal christening took place in Albuquerque, New Mexico, on July 8, with the Duke of Alburquerque in attendance. Regular revenue service began on July 15. The new train was far more efficient than its predecessor. As Fred Frailey explained:

... a conventional El Cap ran 16 cars, carried 438 people and weighed 1,069 tons. Fred Gurley's $13 million got Santa Fe a 13-car train (including the same head-end cars) that carried 130 additional people and weighed 110 tons less ...

— Fred Frailey, Twilight of the Great Trains

Trains editor David P. Morgan thought the equipment was "comfortable" and "[rode] well, even above 90 mph". S. Kip Farrington wrote that he was "definitely sold on the high level in every angle" and that it was "here to stay". A typical train comprised two step-down coaches, five standard coaches, a lounge, and a dining car. The Hi-Level cars continued in service after the Santa Fe combined the El Capitan and Super Chief in 1958. The Santa Fe also converted six single-level baggage cars to baggage-dormitories (Nos. 3477–3482), with a spoiler at one end to create a visual transition. The cars dated from the 1938 version of the El Capitan.

Despite their success, the cars did not inspire a wave of imitators. By the late 1950s, private-sector passenger travel was in what turned out to be irreversible decline. Most railroads were cutting service; few ordered new equipment of any kind. An exception was the Chicago and North Western Railway (CNW). The CNW, like the Burlington, used bilevel coaches on its Chicago-area commuter routes. In 1958 it ordered thirteen intercity bilevel cars from Pullman-Standard: ten coaches, a parlor car, a coach-parlor, and a coach-lounge. Visually they resembled the CNW's existing commuter equipment; a noticeable difference from the Hi-Levels was the adoption of head-end power (HEP) instead of steam. The cars entered service on the Peninsula 400, a Chicago–Ishpeming, Michigan, day train, on October 26, 1958. The CNW would be the only other railroad to introduce bilevel equipment on intercity runs.

By the 1960s, the Santa Fe encountered capacity problems on the San Francisco Chief, which ran between Chicago and San Francisco. Unlike the El Capitan, the Chief carried a mix of sleeping cars and coaches. To augment capacity, the Santa Fe ordered more coaches in 1963–1964 (standard and step-down, twelve each). This was the final major order for new long-distance passenger equipment before the coming of Amtrak; after Kansas City Southern Railway bought ten new coaches from Pullman-Standard in 1965, no new locomotive-hauled coaching stock would be built until the first Amfleets arrived a decade later. Each San Francisco Chief carried four Hi-Level coaches, displacing six single-level coaches.

=== Amtrak ===
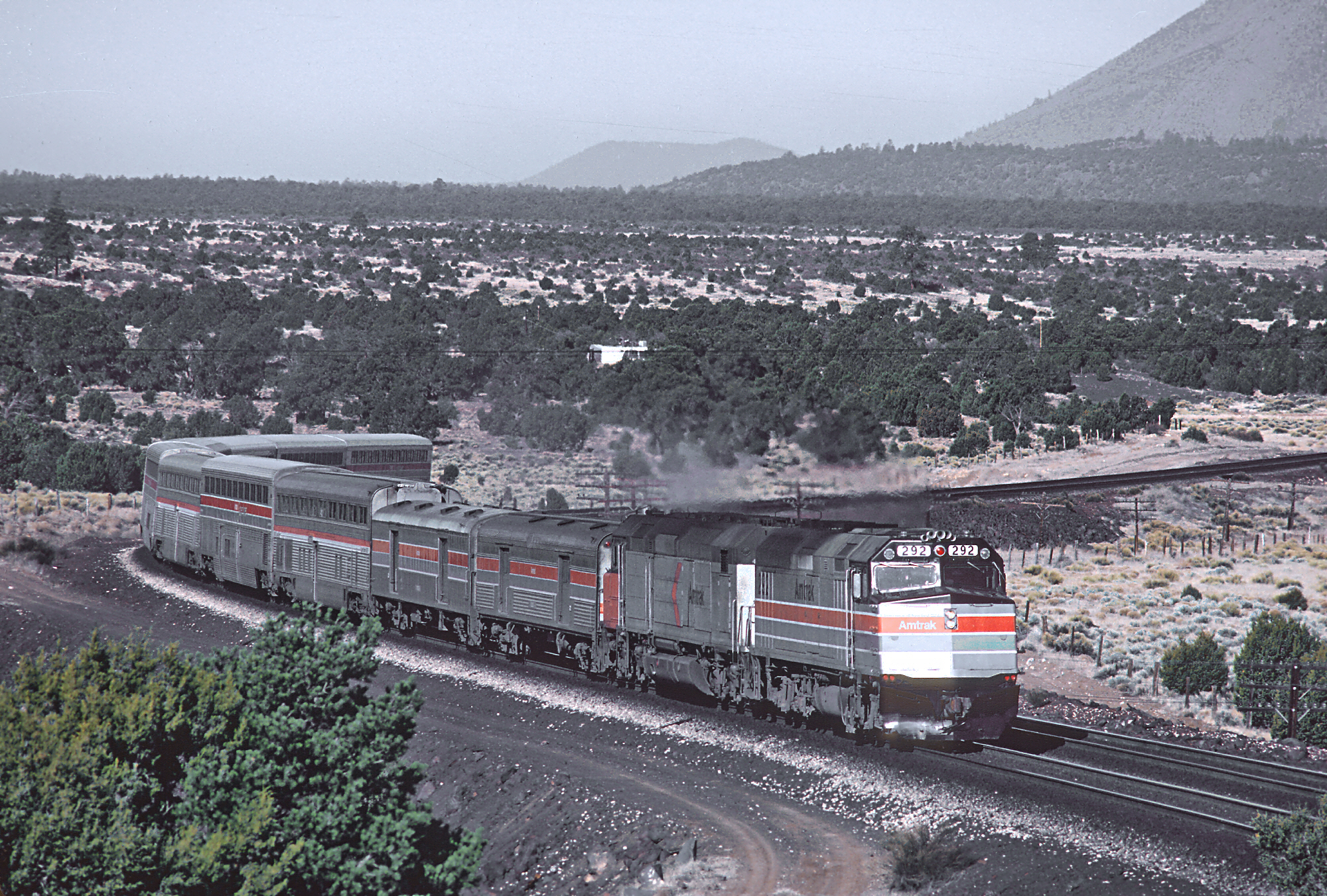
Hi-Levels mixed with slightly taller Superliners on the Southwest Limited in 1981

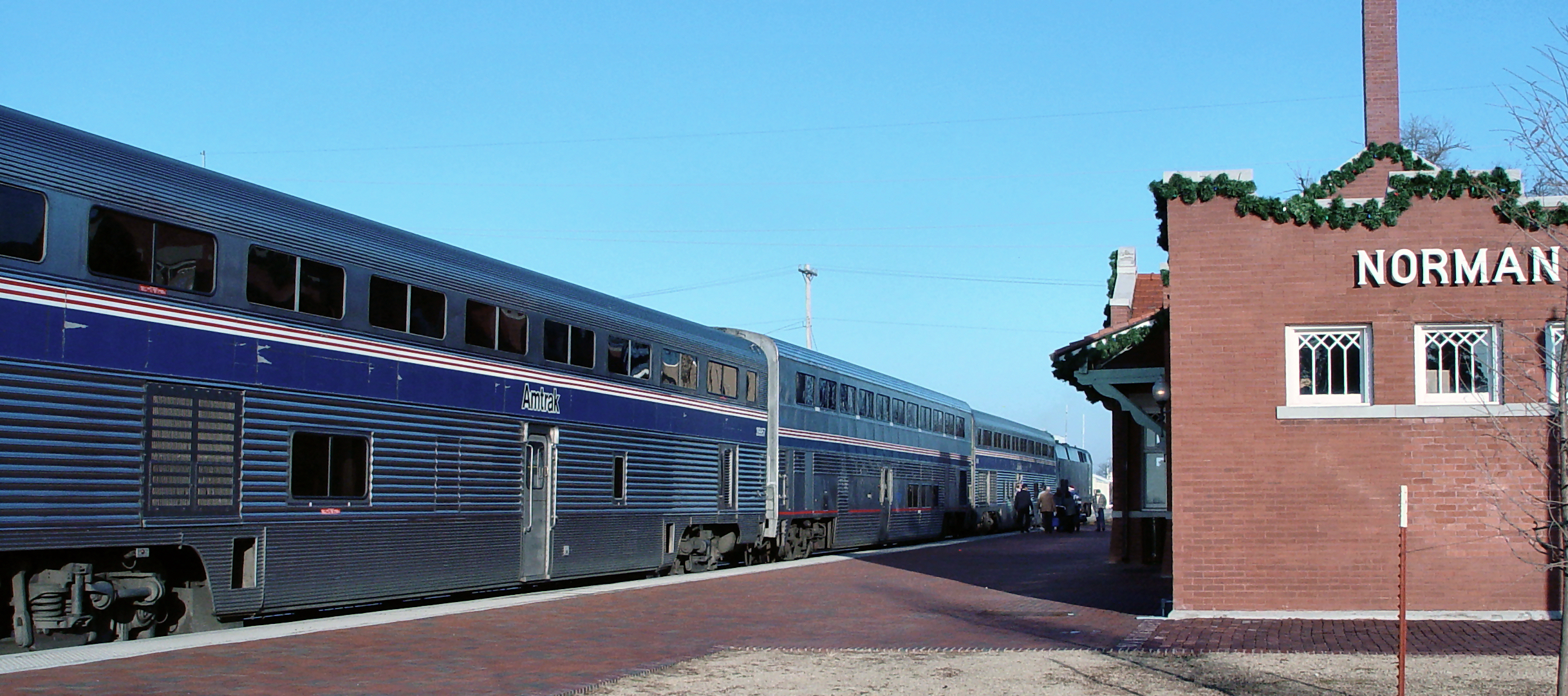
Hi-Level coaches mixed with a Superliner coach (center) on the Heartland Flyer in 2005

Throughout the 1960s passenger ridership declined on American railroads while losses mounted. In 1971 the United States federal government created Amtrak, a subsidized for-profit corporation, to take over intercity services and reverse the decline. The Santa Fe, after some hesitation, participated. Amtrak took over the Santa Fe's remaining trains on May 1, 1971. It acquired the entire Hi-Level fleet and continued to operate them. The primary assignment continued to be the combined Super Chief/El Capitan, known as the Southwest Limited from 1974 to 1984 and the Southwest Chief thereafter. The Chicago–Houston Texas Chief, another ex-Santa Fe train, also carried Hi-Level coaches.

Amtrak was impressed with the Hi-Levels and used them as the basis for the design of the bilevel Superliner family of railcars. The first of 284 Superliner I cars began arriving from Pullman-Standard in 1978. As the Superliners went into service, Hi-Levels could be found on more of Amtrak's trains throughout the Western United States. Hi-Level coaches appeared on the San Francisco–Chicago San Francisco Zephyr, Chicago–San Antonio, Texas–Los Angeles Eagle, and the Chicago–Seattle, Washington/Portland, Oregon Empire Builder. Dining cars displaced from the Southwest Limited filled in on the Ogden, Utah–Los Angeles Desert Wind. Tunnel clearances around New York City and elsewhere prevented their use on the Northeast Corridor.

The Superliner I order did not include any "step down" coaches, so Hi-Level coaches continued to fulfill this function on Superliner-equipped trains. In the 1980s, Amtrak rebuilt many of these coaches as dormitory-coaches, with half of the car given over to crew space. Amtrak retired all six single-level baggage-dormitory cars by 1981 in lieu of converting them to HEP. By 1990 the Amtrak fleet stood at 69 cars: 36 dormitory-coaches, 21 coaches, six diner-lounges rebuilt from dining cars, and the six lounge cars, which Amtrak marketed as "See-Level Lounges". The arrival of 195 Superliner II cars from Bombardier Transportation in 1993–1995 permitted the retirement of most of the remaining Hi-Level cars. The Chicago–Toronto International used a mix of Superliners and Hi-Levels from 1995 to 2000. Hi-Levels remained in service on the Oklahoma City–Fort Worth Heartland Flyer into the 2000s. The majority of the Hi-Level fleet was retired at the beginning of 2003. The private equity fund Corridor Capital owns most of the fleet, and has proposed employing them for various passenger projects within the United States, including a plan to revive the Coast Daylight.

The last major Hi-Level assignment on Amtrak was the Los Angeles–Seattle Coast Starlight. In the late 1990s Amtrak refurbished five of the six lounges for use as sleeping car passenger-only lounges, branded as the "Pacific Parlour Car". Amtrak offered separate food and beverage service in the upper level and installed a movie theater in the lower level. The railway writer and historian Karl Zimmermann called them "the greatest treat for sleeping car passengers on Amtrak". By the late 2010s Amtrak was manufacturing new parts for the Hi-Levels at Beech Grove, or in some cases retrofitting the Hi-Levels to use Superliner parts. Amtrak retired the cars after their last run on February 4, 2018, citing safety concerns and rising maintenance costs. They were the last Hi-Levels in regular service, and among the few remaining Heritage Fleet cars.

The Steam Railroading Institute, a heritage railroad based in Owosso, Michigan, acquired several for use in excursion service. The Nickel Plate Express of Noblesville, Indiana, also acquired several for excursion service. Three cars were sold to the Naugatuck Railroad in January 2025.

== Design ==
The Hi-Levels stood 15 1/2 feet (4.7 m) high, 2 feet (0.61 m) taller than most conventional equipment. Seating occupied the entire upper level, with restrooms, baggage, and other non-revenue areas on the lower level. In most cars, vestibules connected the upper levels only. A central staircase linked the two levels. Hi-Levels featured a row of windows across the upper level; on the prototype coaches, this row slanted inwards. The two-level design offered several advantages over conventional single-level equipment. Budd and the Santa Fe expected the upper level, located 8 feet 7 inches (2.62 m) above the rails, to provide a smoother, quieter ride for passengers. With the lower level free of passengers, designers could provide larger restrooms and baggage areas. Finally, the lower level contained all the electrical equipment, away from the passengers, and with easy access for maintenance. Budd used stainless steel in the construction, with fluted sides. The cars cost $275,000 apiece.

Budd built the Hi-Levels with steam heating, the standard method for ensuring passenger comfort in the 1950s. For air conditioning and other electrical needs, it chose to employ independent diesel generators in each car. Coaches required a single 40-kilowatt (54 hp) generator; the massive dining car required two such generators to support the kitchen appliances. In the lounge car a larger 60-kilowatt (80 hp) generator was employed. Beginning in the mid-1970s, Amtrak adopted head-end power (HEP) for new orders. HEP and steam are incompatible, so Amtrak had the Hi-Levels converted to HEP to permit their use with new cars. Santa Fe handled the conversion of the Hi-Levels in its Topeka, Kansas, shops. Of the 73 Hi-Levels, all but three underwent the conversion.

=== Coaches ===
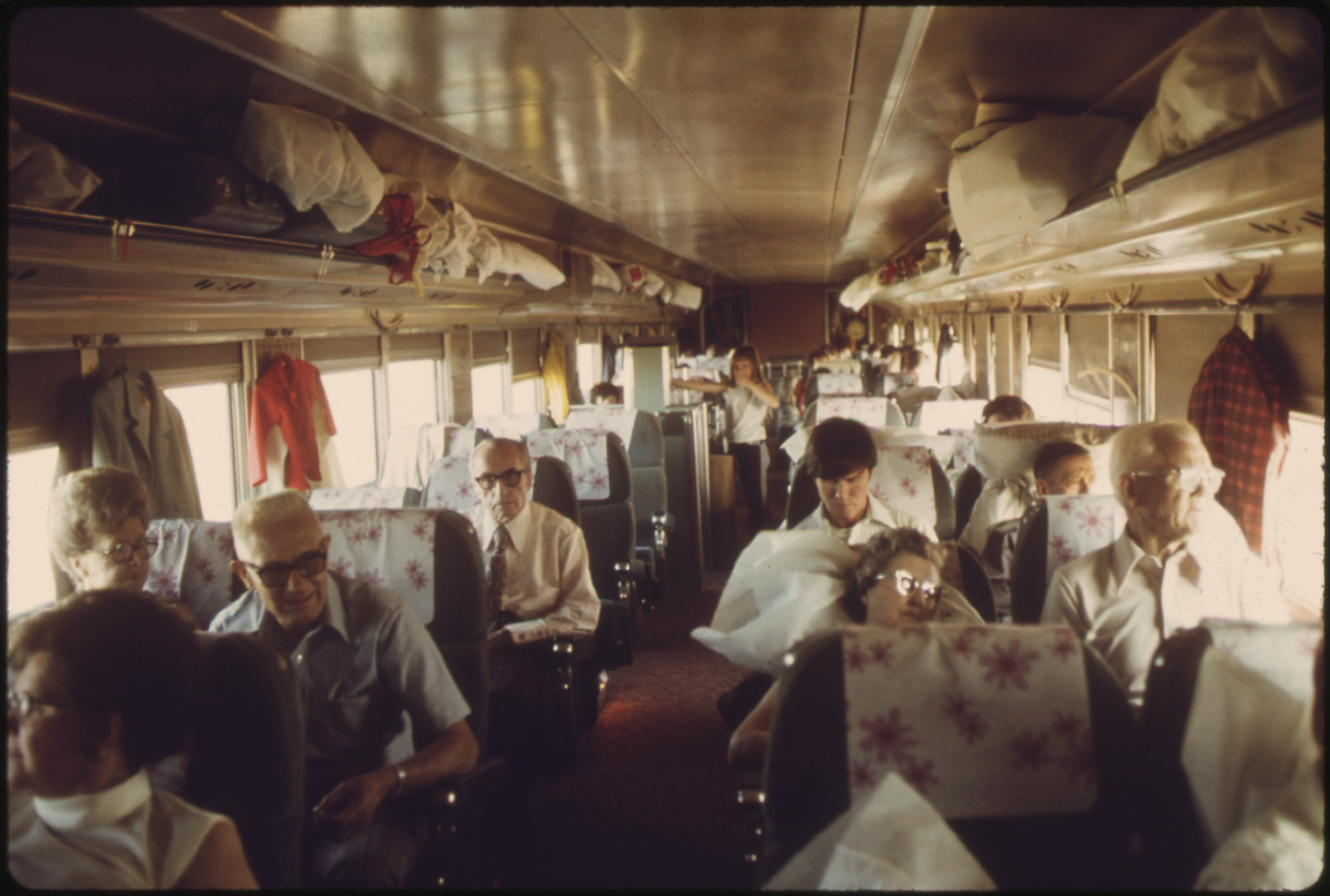
Interior of a "step-down" coach on Amtrak's Southwest Limited in 1974

The 61 coaches could carry either 68 or 72 passengers, more than the 44 of comparable single-level long-distance coaches. This increased capacity permitted the Santa Fe to run the El Capitan with fewer cars, while increasing the total number of passengers carried. The 68-seat coaches featured "step down" stairs at one end to permit access to standard-height equipment; that space was given over to four additional seats on the 72-seat coaches. The prototypes also featured step-down stairs, but carried one fewer passenger.

The passenger windows were 21 inches (53 cm) high. The seat pitch was 50 inches (130 cm). The Dwight Austin-manufactured "Traveleze" seats reclined, and included both head and leg rests. Hand luggage could be stored in racks above the coach seats, or in large storage racks on the lower level. In the prototypes the upper level had no restrooms; in response to passenger feedback, Budd added a restroom to the upper level in the production models. The prototypes also included a "step up" from the aisle to the coach seats; in the production cars, the seats rested flush with the aisle. Each coach weighed 80 short tons (73 t).

=== Lounges ===
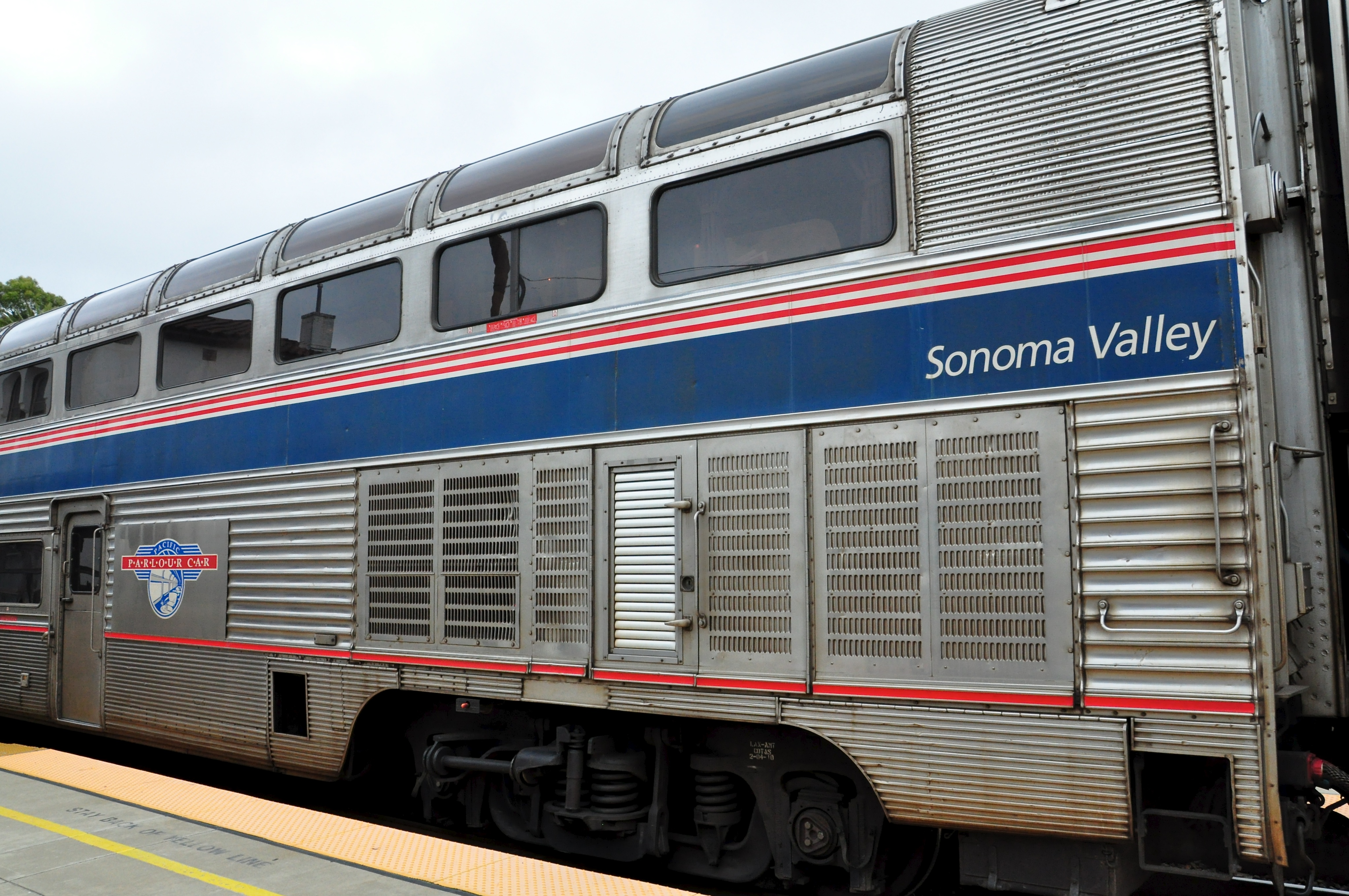
Amtrak's Sonoma Valley lounge in 2010

The lounge cars were similar to the full-length Big Dome lounges which had entered service with the Santa Fe in 1954. The most obvious difference was the absence of a forward-looking view on the Hi-Level cars. Each of the six lounges could seat 60 people on the upper level. The seating was a mixture of single seats and two- and four-top tables. Nicknames for these cars included "Top of the Cap" and "Sky Lounges". A glass top across two-thirds of the car distinguished it from the rest of the Hi-Levels. The lower level featured the "Kachina Coffee Shop" and a lounge area with seating for 26. Passengers on the lower level could look out through large, 56-inch (140 cm) windows. The lounge cars weighed 83 short tons (75 t). Under Santa Fe operation there were attendants on both levels, and a newsstand on the upper level.

=== Dining cars ===
Six dining cars were built. Each dining car seated 80, all on the upper level, compared to 36 in a single-level diner, enabling each car to do the work of two single-level dining cars. The lower level housed the kitchen, including ovens, hot plates, a refrigerator, and a dishwasher. Dumbwaiters carried food to the upper level. A diesel generator supplied power to the appliances. The dining cars, the largest single-unit dining cars ever built, weighed 97 short tons (88 t) and rode on six-wheel trucks. As Superliner dining cars arrived in the 1980s, Amtrak rebuilt these cars as diner-lounges, incorporating booths and lounge seating.

=== Sleeping car proposal ===
Santa Fe considered equipping the Super Chief with Hi-Level sleeping cars, and Budd drafted a design for such a car in 1957. In this design there was an aisle on the lower level only, and set against one side instead of centerline. The lower level also contained six single bedrooms and a toilet. The upper level would have eight two-person "Vista Bedrooms" which spanned the width of the car. Access to these rooms would be from four sets of stairs from the lower level aside. Each Vista Bedroom would contain an individual toilet and two beds: one stacked above the bed in the single bedroom beneath, and one lengthwise over the aisle. Nothing came of this proposal. Pullman-Standard adopted a more traditional design for Amtrak's Superliner I in the 1970s: five bedrooms and ten roomettes on the upper level, two bedrooms and four roomettes on the lower level.

=== Summary ===
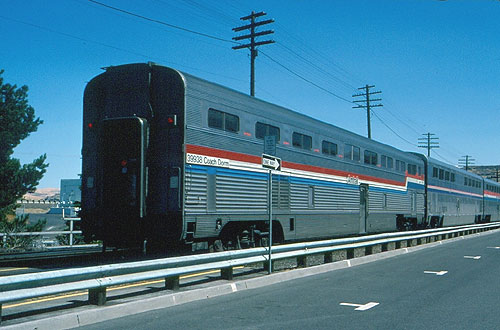
A "step down" or transition coach on the Pioneer in 1994. The vestibule is on the lower level.

Including the two prototypes, Budd built 73 Hi-Level cars:

Type	Quantity	Original road numbers
67-seat prototype coach	2	526–527
68-seat "step down" coach	22	528–549
72-seat coach	37	700–736
Lounge	6	575–580
Diner	6	650–655
