= Combine car =

Railway car with both passenger and cargo areas

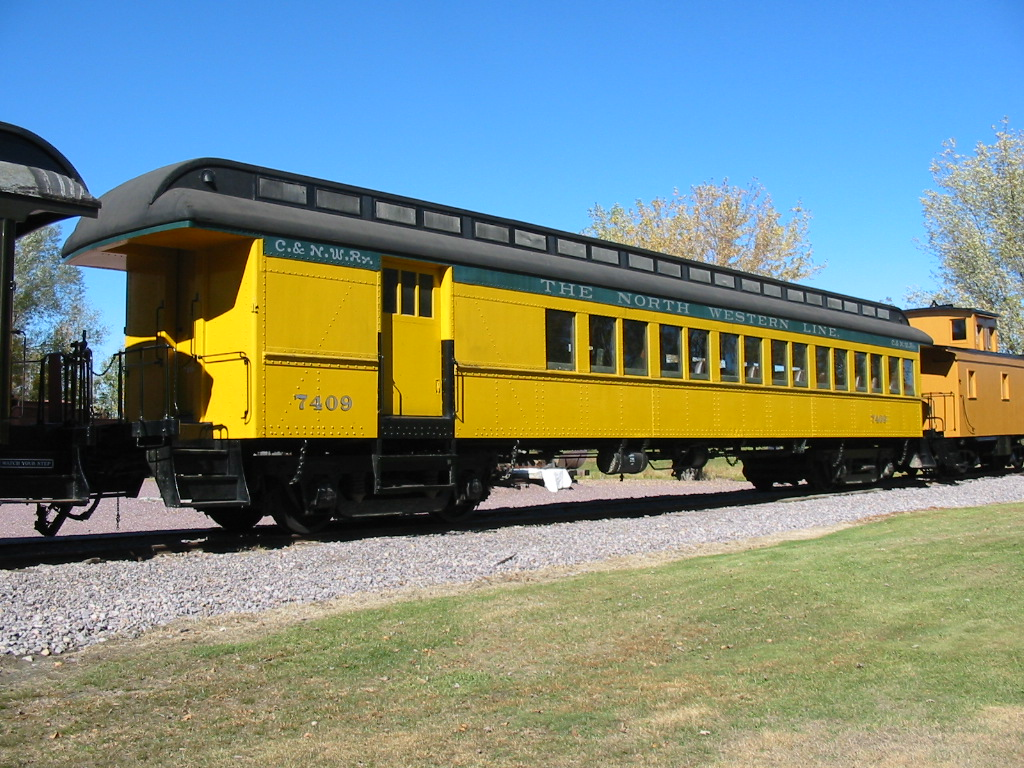
A coach-baggage on display at the Mid-Continent Railway Museum in North Freedom, Wisconsin.

A combine car in North American parlance, most often referred to simply as a combine, is a type of railroad car which combines sections for both passengers and freight.

Most often, it was used on short lines to carry passengers and their luggage, as a full car would not have been cost effective. One half (or less) of the car is built like a baggage car while the other half of the car is a regular passenger car. This type of combine is referred to as a coach-baggage. Another common type of combine in railroad use was the coach-RPO. A portion of this type of car was configured as a railway post office while the rest of the car was configured as a coach. The New York, New Haven and Hartford Railroad operated a combine separated into an RPO and a smoking section. In 1893, Pullman produced a combine with a baggage area, buffet, barber shop, bathroom with tub and a smoking section featuring a fireplace.

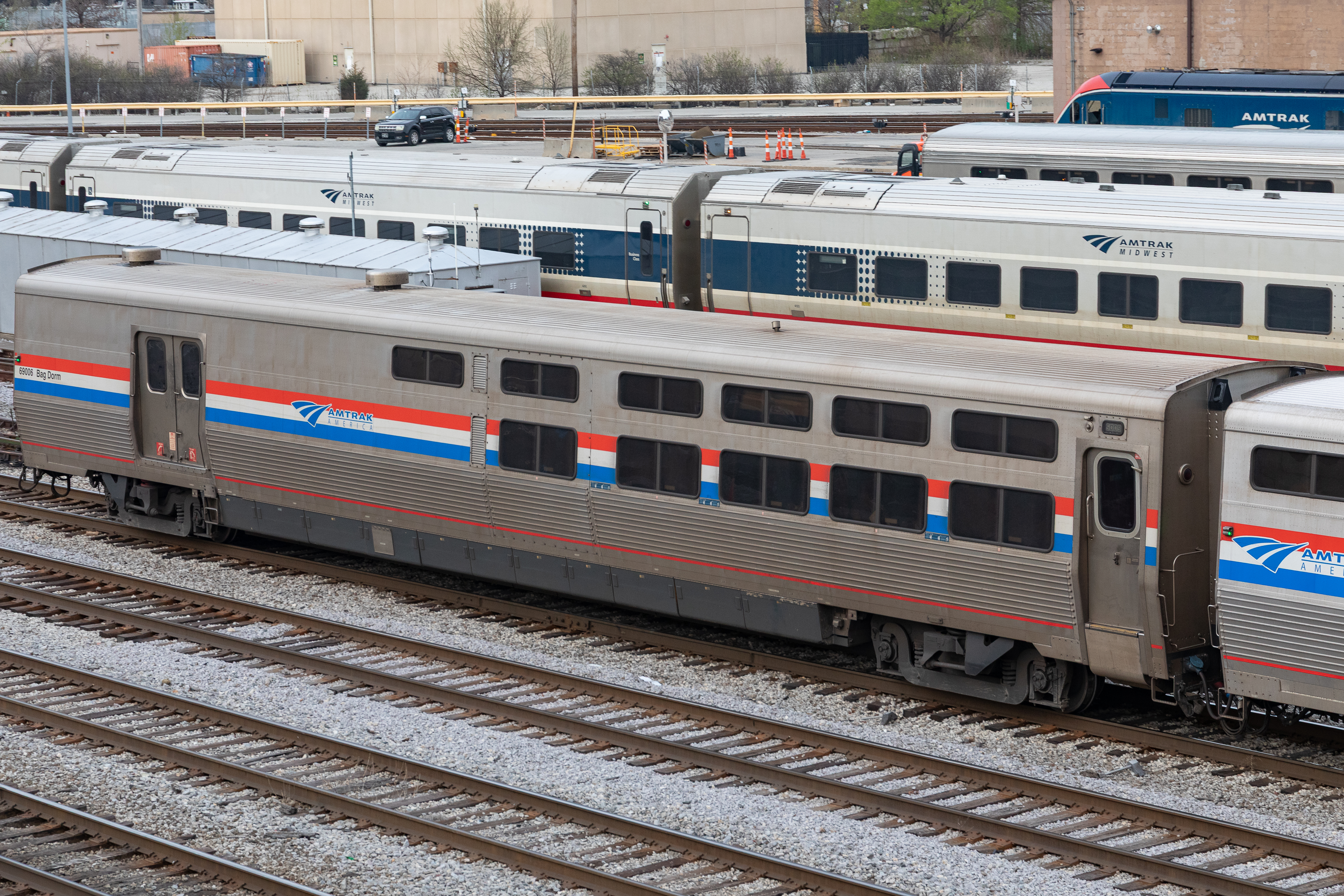
An Amtrak Viewliner II Baggage-Dormitory car in Chicago.

When Amtrak took over in 1971, lightweight combines were used on most routes, particularly on trains that had used combines before Amtrak took over. As Amtrak started rehabbing their older cars to Heritage Fleet standards, the only combines which survived were the Baggage-Dorm cars. As Amtrak received the Superliner cars in all forms, including dorm cars, the only routes which required rehabbed single-level dorm cars were the East Coast routes (Crescent, Lake Shore Limited, Silver Star, etc.) due to low tunnel clearance. Because Amtrak had a surplus of single-level coaches due to the recent delivery of Amfleet coaches, baggage-coaches were unnecessary. Thus, baggage-dorm cars were the only cars that should logically be rehabbed. Rehabbed baggage-dorm cars were used on Amtrak East Coast routes from the early 1980s until 1996.

When Amtrak received its new Viewliner and Superliner II sleeping cars in 1996, some of the Heritage 10-6 sleepers were turned into crew dorms, and the dorms became unnecessary. After Amtrak received the Superliner II coaches, some of the Heritage coaches which had been replaced were turned into baggage cars. Thus, baggage-dorms became unnecessary, and all were retired. The Viewliner II orders included 10 baggage-dorms and 4 are currently in service on the Crescent route.

Although Amtrak operates many cars in its Superliner fleet that are labeled as coach-baggage, they are not often referred to as combines. Via Rail still operates a few combines in the traditional sense, which carry passengers, baggage and supplies for villages en route. They are towed by freight trains in far northern Manitoba.

== See also ==
- Bruck
- Combi aircraft
- Doodlebug (railcar), a self-propelled railcar most commonly configured as a combine car

== Bibliography ==
- White, John H. (1985) [1978]. The American Railroad Passenger Car. Baltimore, Maryland: Johns Hopkins University Press. ISBN 978-0-8018-2743-3.
