= Baggage car =

Railway car for carrying passengers' luggage

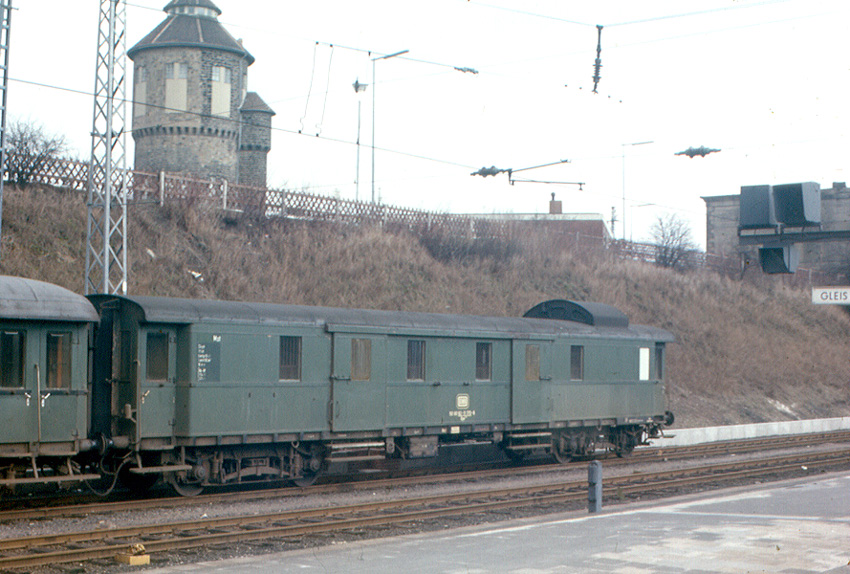
Baggage car of a pre-war Deutsche Bundesbahn design

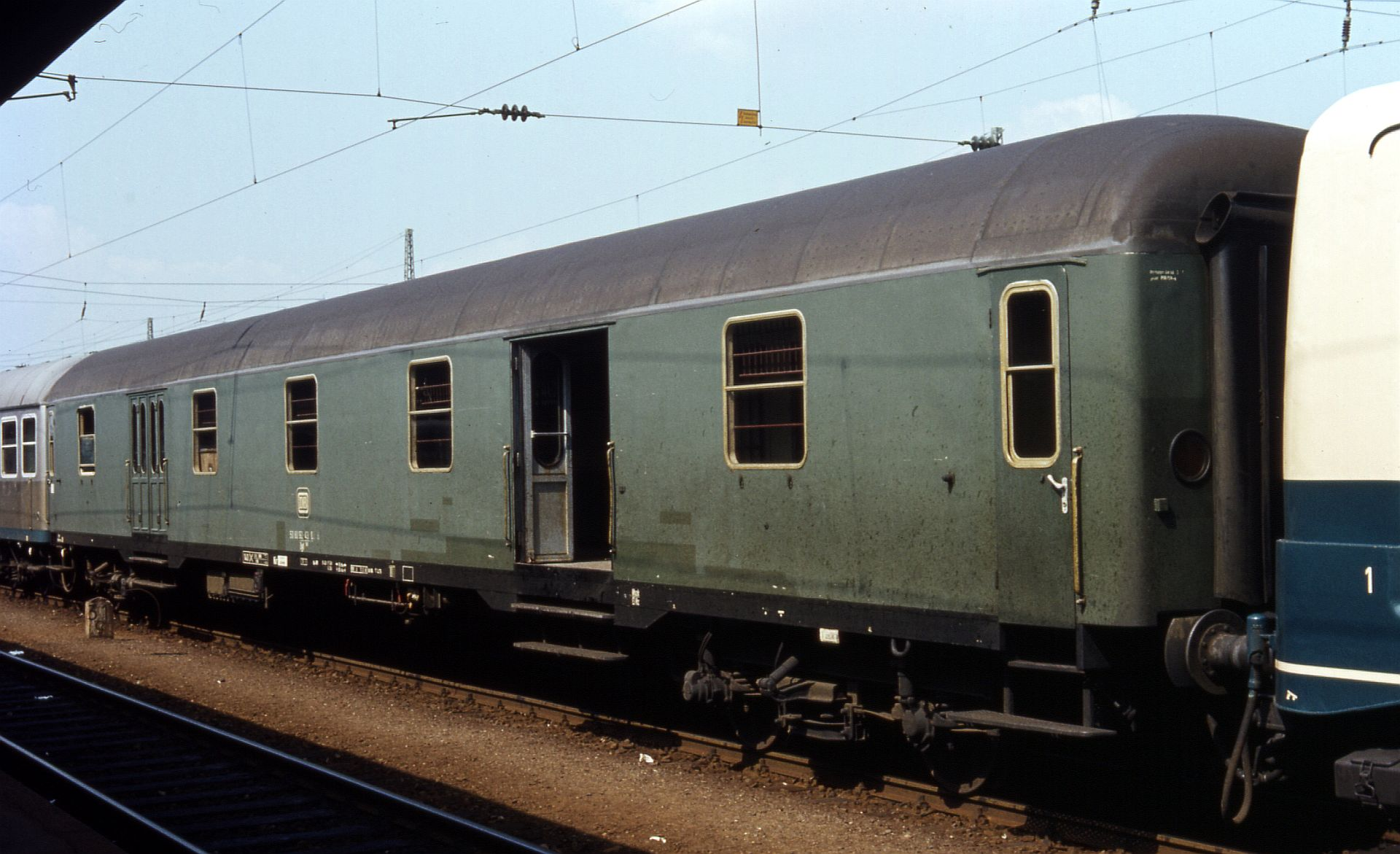
Prototype baggage car Dyl^{961} of the Deutsche Bundesbahn

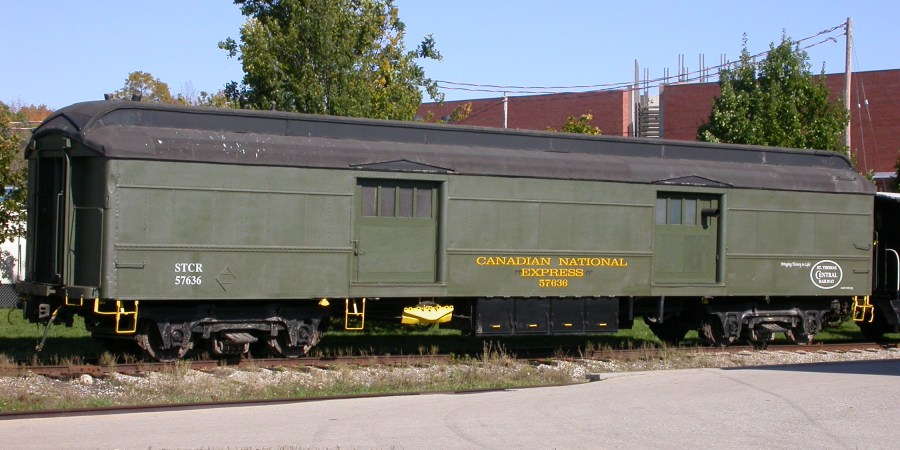
A restored heavyweight Canadian National Railway baggage car on display in Waterloo, Ontario, Canada.

A baggage car (US terminology, abbreviated Bg, also known as a luggage van or brake van (UK terminology) is a type of railway car often forming part of the composition of passenger trains and used to carry passengers' checked baggage, as well as parcels ("express") and (historically) mail. It typically contains one or more luggage compartments with large loading doors (such as sliding doors, folding doors, or roller shutters) and usually includes a conductor's compartment for train staff. In North America, being typically coupled at the front of the train behind the locomotive, this type of car is sometimes described as "head-end equipment". Passengers are not normally allowed access to baggage cars while trains are in motion, except to care for animals travelling as checked baggage. In Europe, many baggage cars are built as corridor coaches with a side gangway next to the baggage area, so that they can be marshalled anywhere in the train without interrupting through passage.

In North America, a special type of baggage car came equipped with doors on one end to facilitate transport of large pieces of equipment and scenery for Broadway shows and other productions. These "theatrical" baggage cars were assigned theatrical names (i.e. Romeo and Juliet), and were similar to the "horse cars" that were used to transport racehorses.

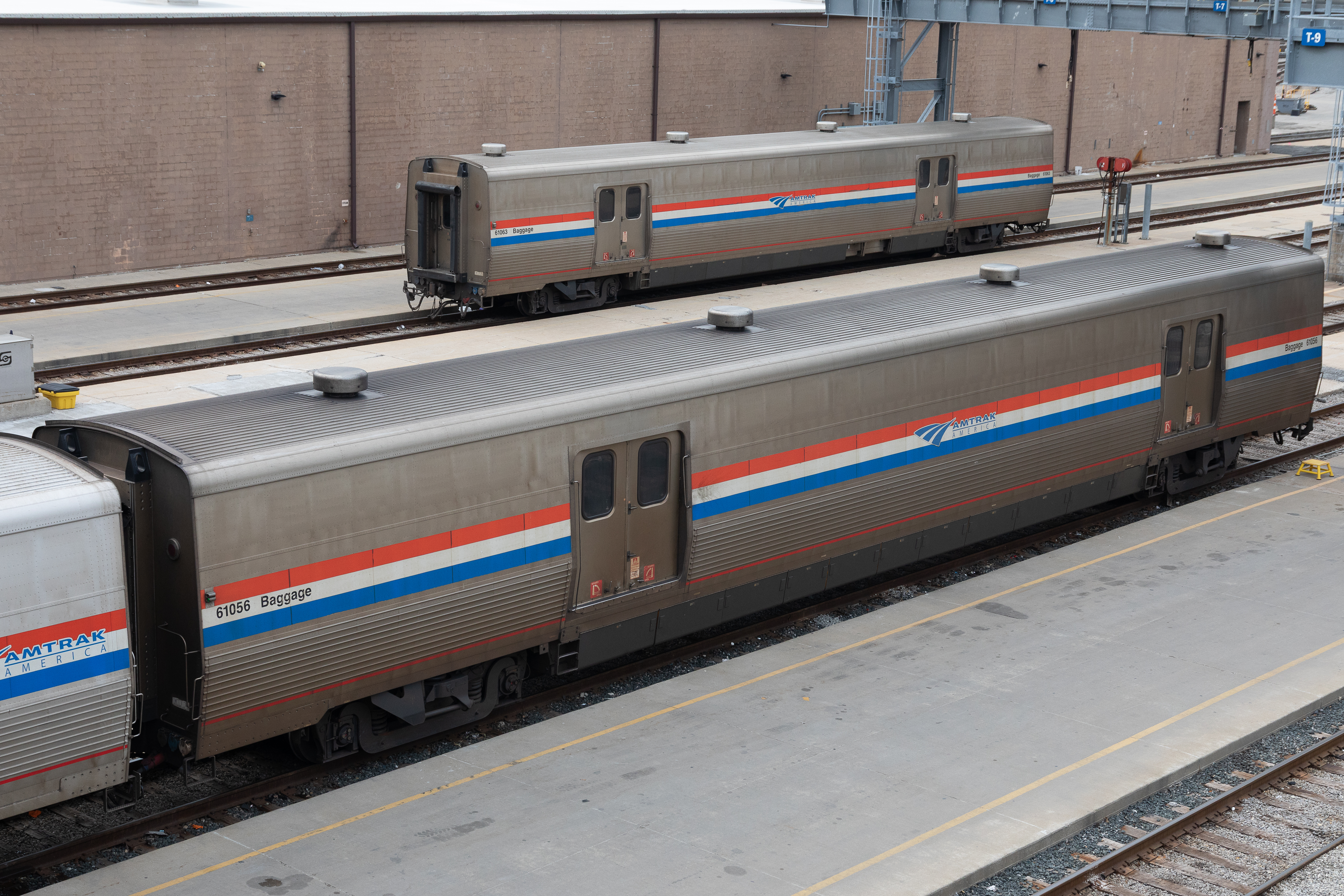
A pair of Viewliner II baggage cars at the Amtrak coach yard in Chicago in April 2025.

== Usage ==
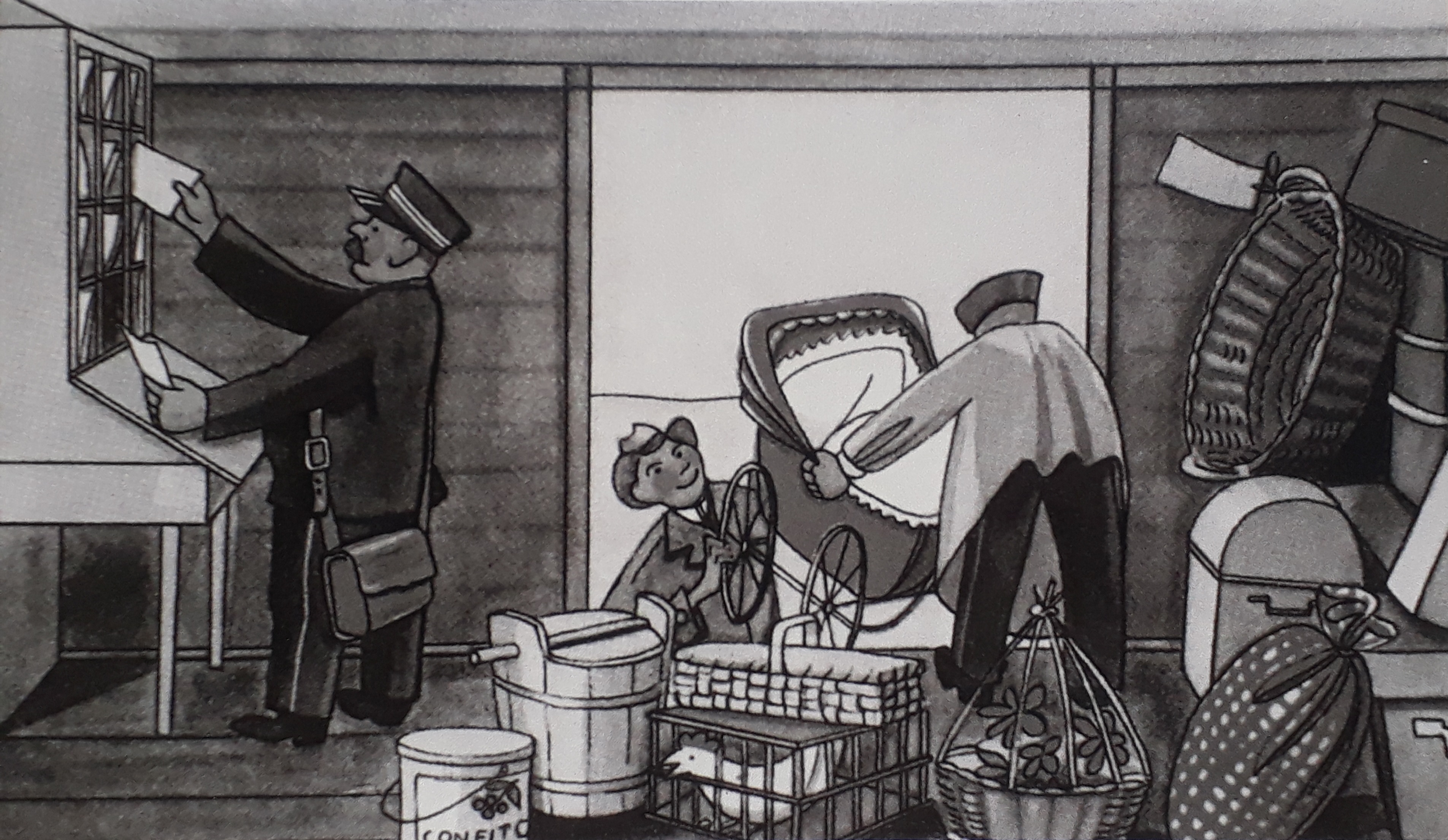
The train conductor's mobile office in a baggage car, illustration by Cili Ringgenberg, c. 1945

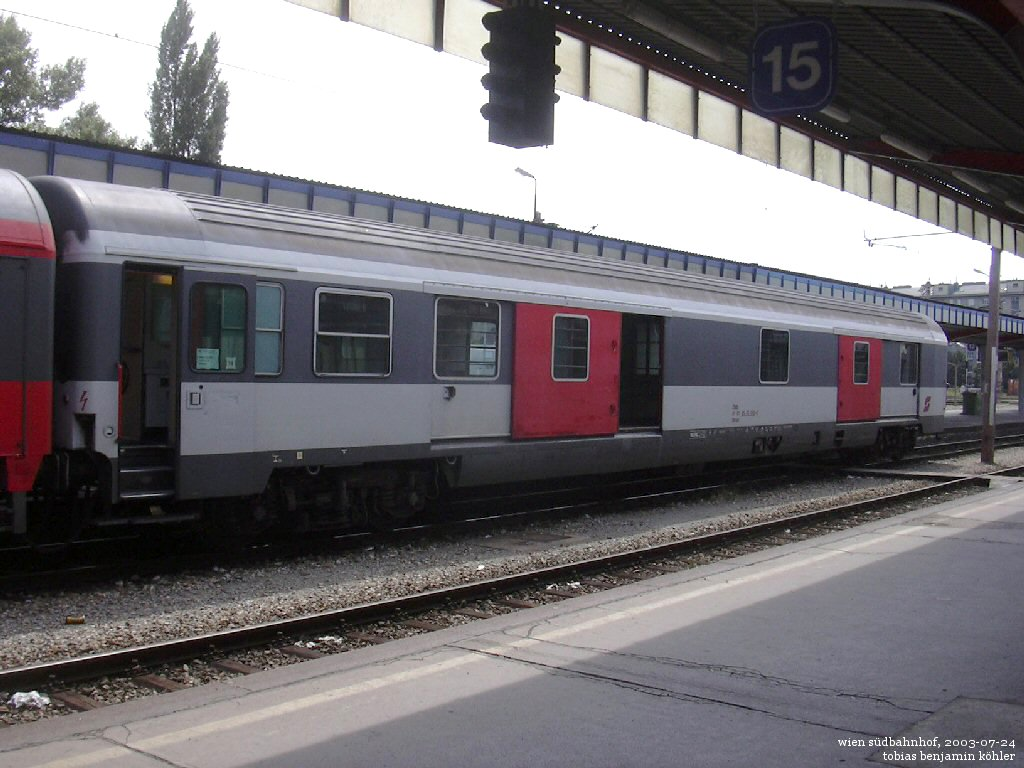
ÖBB baggage car Dmsz

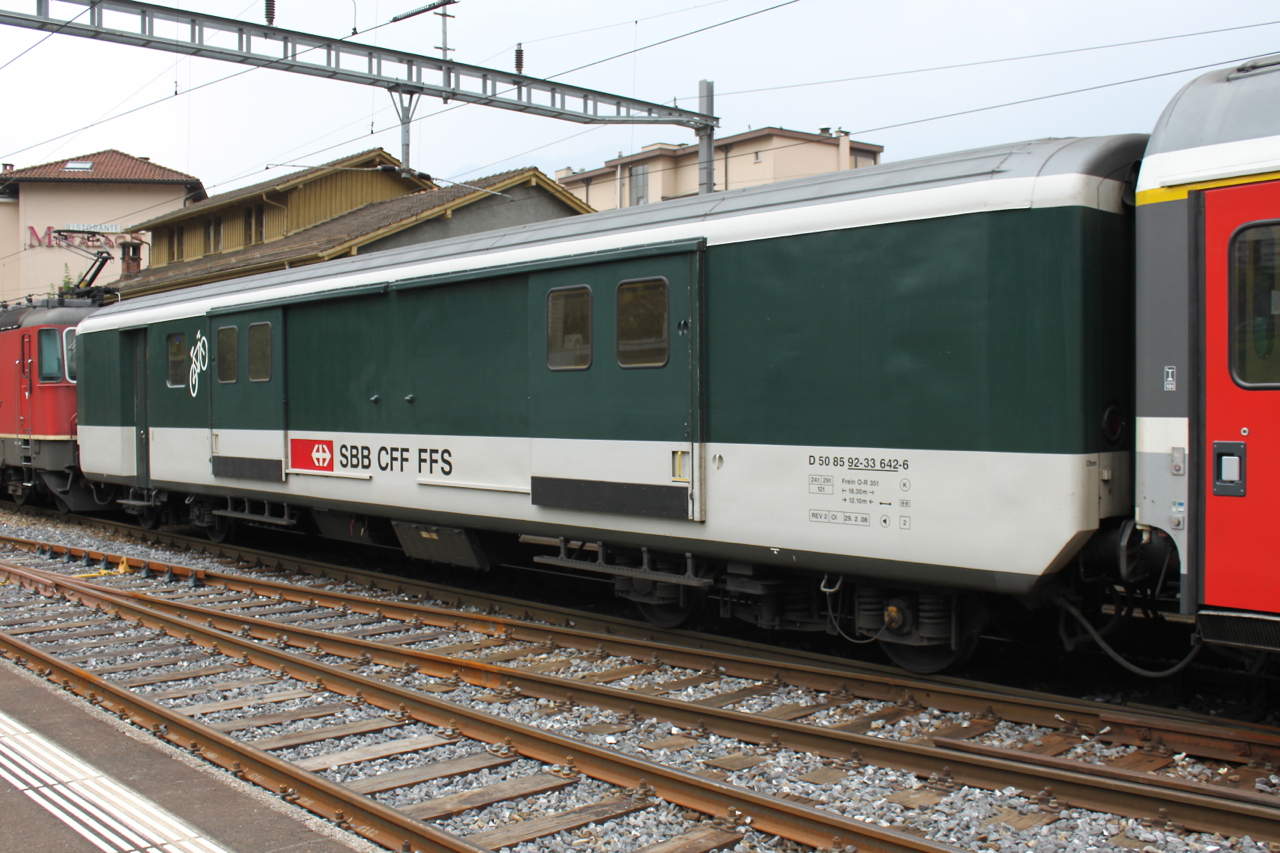
SBB baggage car type EW II

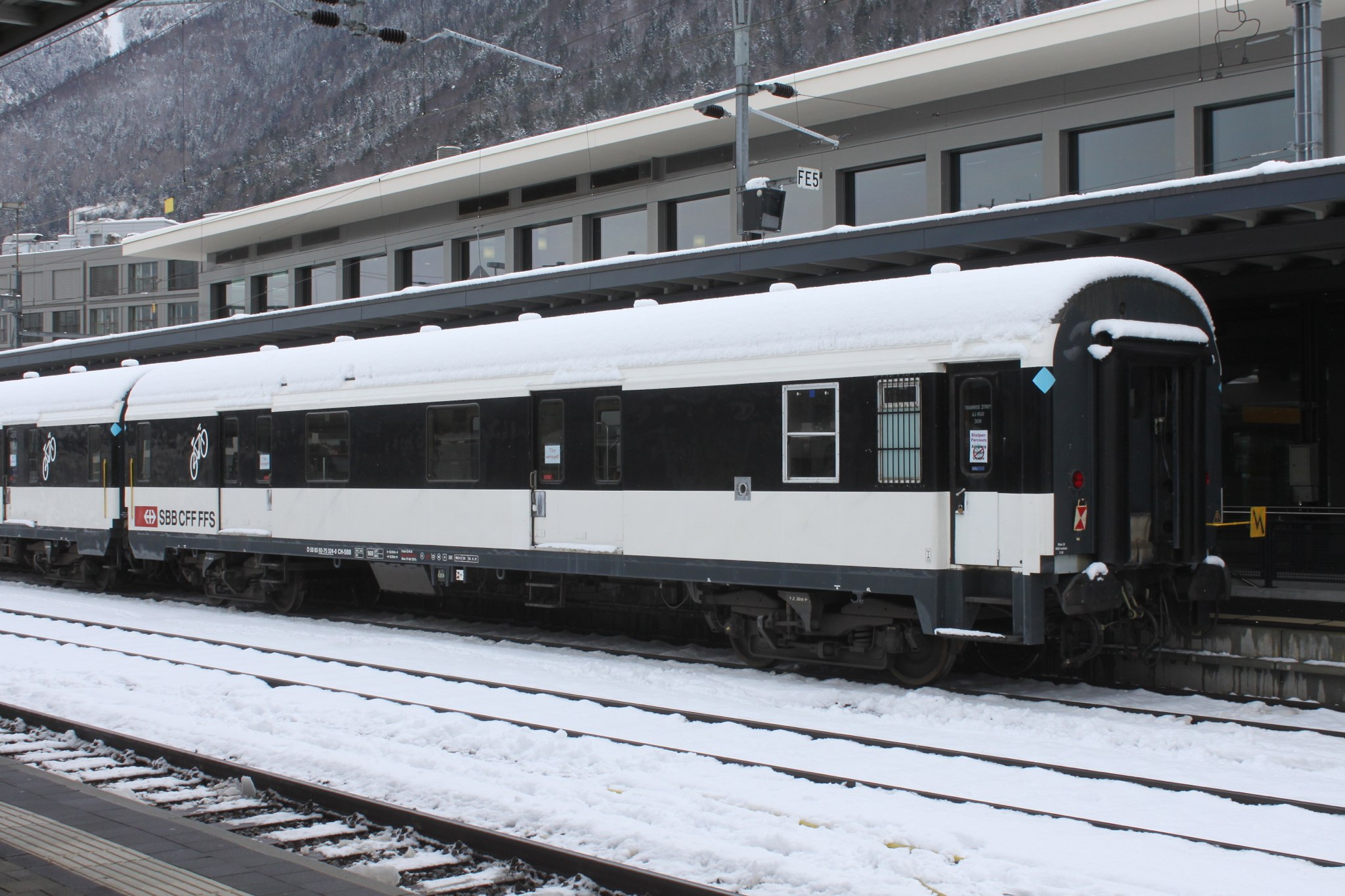
SBB baggage car MC 76 (ex SNCF)

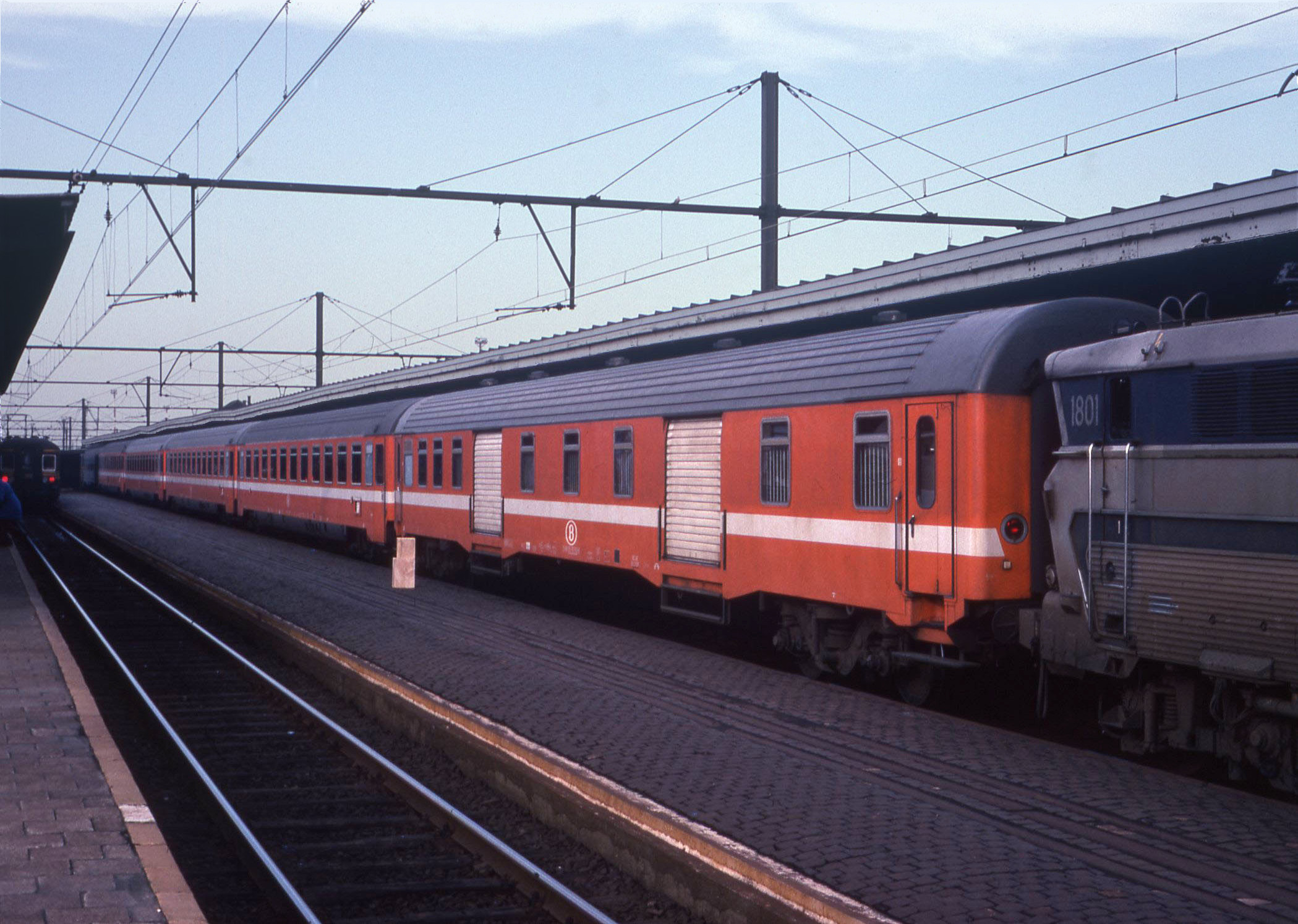
Belgian Dms baggage car with roller doors for loading, in Eurofima livery

Baggage cars 139 and 140 of the Royal Württemberg State Railways, 1879

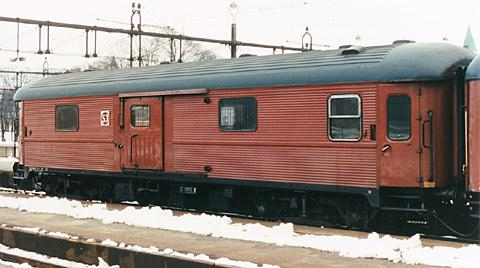
A resgodsvagn of the Swedish State Railways (SJ) in Malmö in 1988

=== Baggage handling ===
Traditionally, passengers could hand in their luggage at the baggage counter of a railway station, where it was loaded into the baggage car and collected at the destination station. This service has largely been discontinued, although it still exists in Switzerland. After the end of this service, many baggage cars were adapted for bicycle transportation. Sometimes luggage can also be loaded directly by passengers, especially bicycles.

There are also combination baggage cars, which include other passenger areas (e.g. seating). In particular, multiple units often have only part of a car set aside for baggage. Modern commuter rail vehicles usually include a multi-purpose area where bicycles, strollers, heavy loads, and wheelchair users can be accommodated. By contrast, a full baggage car is sometimes referred to as a dedicated baggage car.

=== Use in trains ===
Baggage cars were mainly used in passenger trains, though there were also dedicated overnight baggage trains and freight train guard's vans that included baggage space.

Until the mid-20th century, baggage cars were generally marshalled immediately behind the locomotive for safety reasons. In Europe today, they are usually found at the front or rear of the train, though some trains have them in the middle.

=== Withdrawal at Deutsche Bahn ===
The Deutsche Bahn phased out baggage cars in the early 1990s. In 1995, the last baggage counters were closed and baggage transport ceased.

== Development in France (SNCF) ==
=== SNCF baggage vans ===
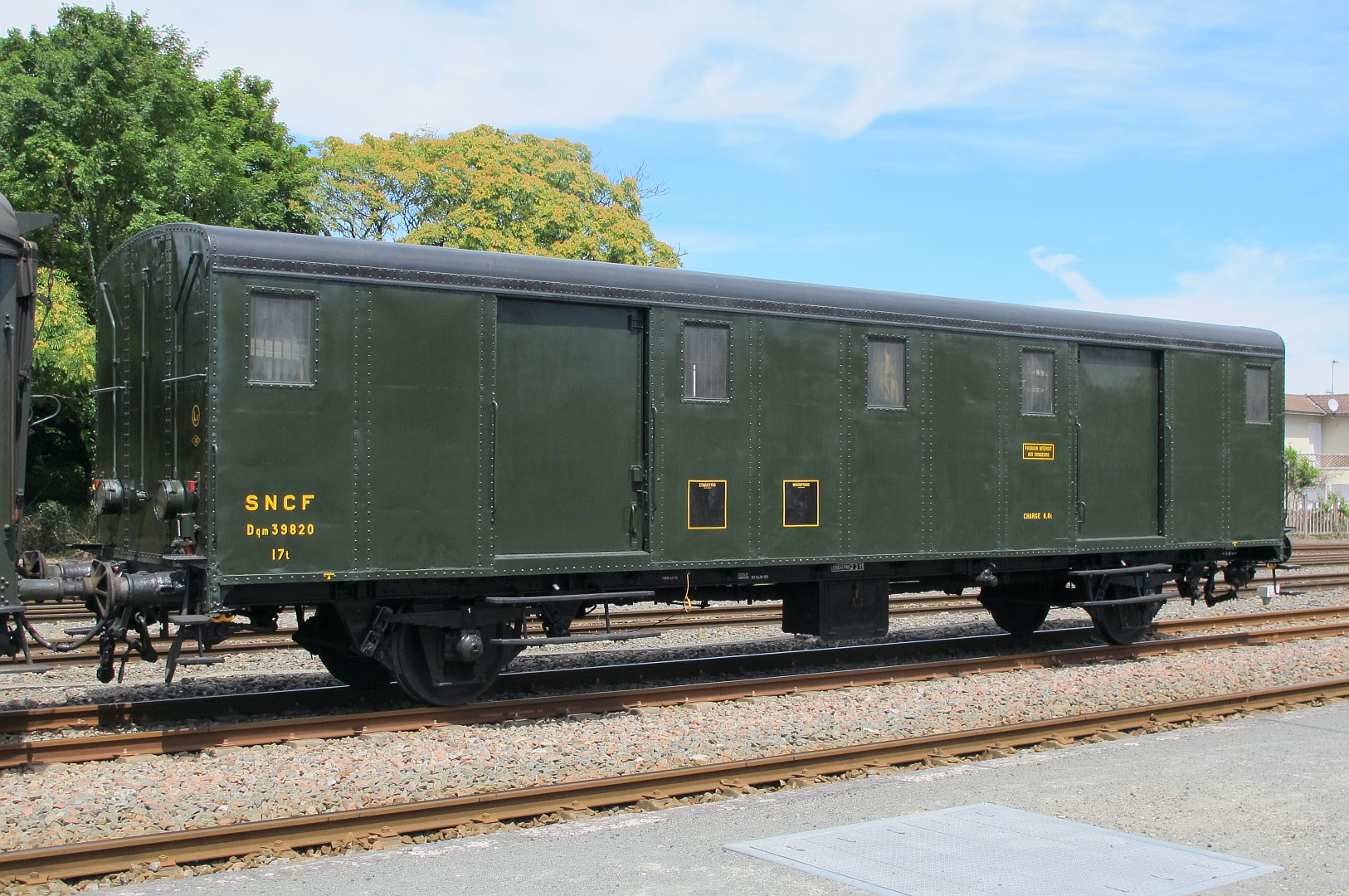
OCEM 1929 baggage van Dqm 39820

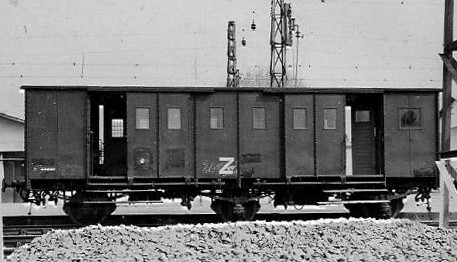
PLM three-axle baggage van

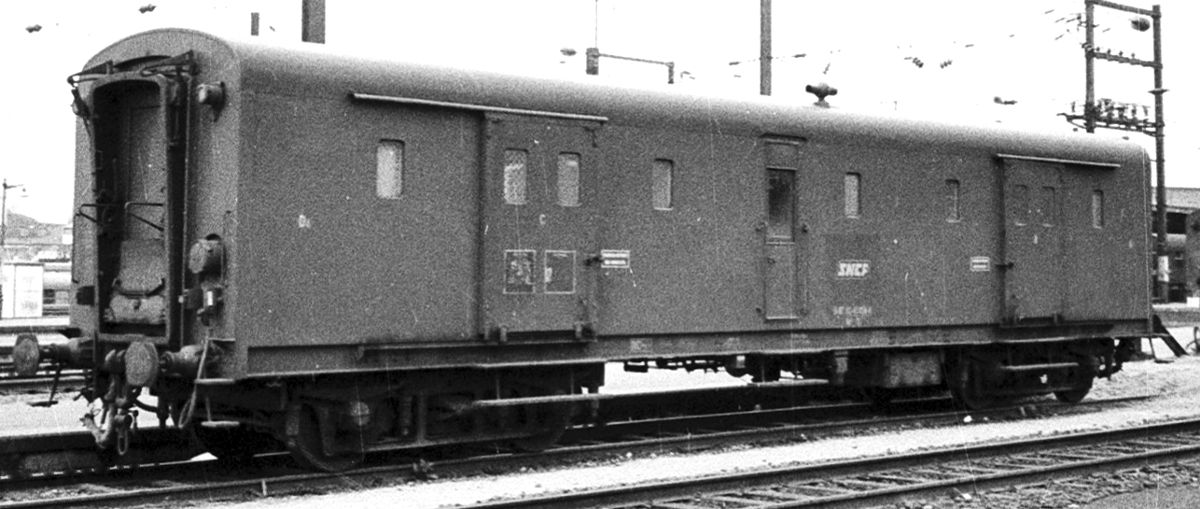
SNCF Est bogie baggage van

In addition to the types listed below, there were also baggage vans integrated into coach series such as the Rapides Nord or the OCEM riveted stock.

- Dd^{2} Nord vans

The two-axle Dd^{2} Nord vans were built in 180 examples. They were used in cross-Channel traffic and were withdrawn in 1981.

== See also ==
- Railway post office
- Brake van
- Combine car
