= Heritage Fleet =

Original rolling stock provided to Amtrak

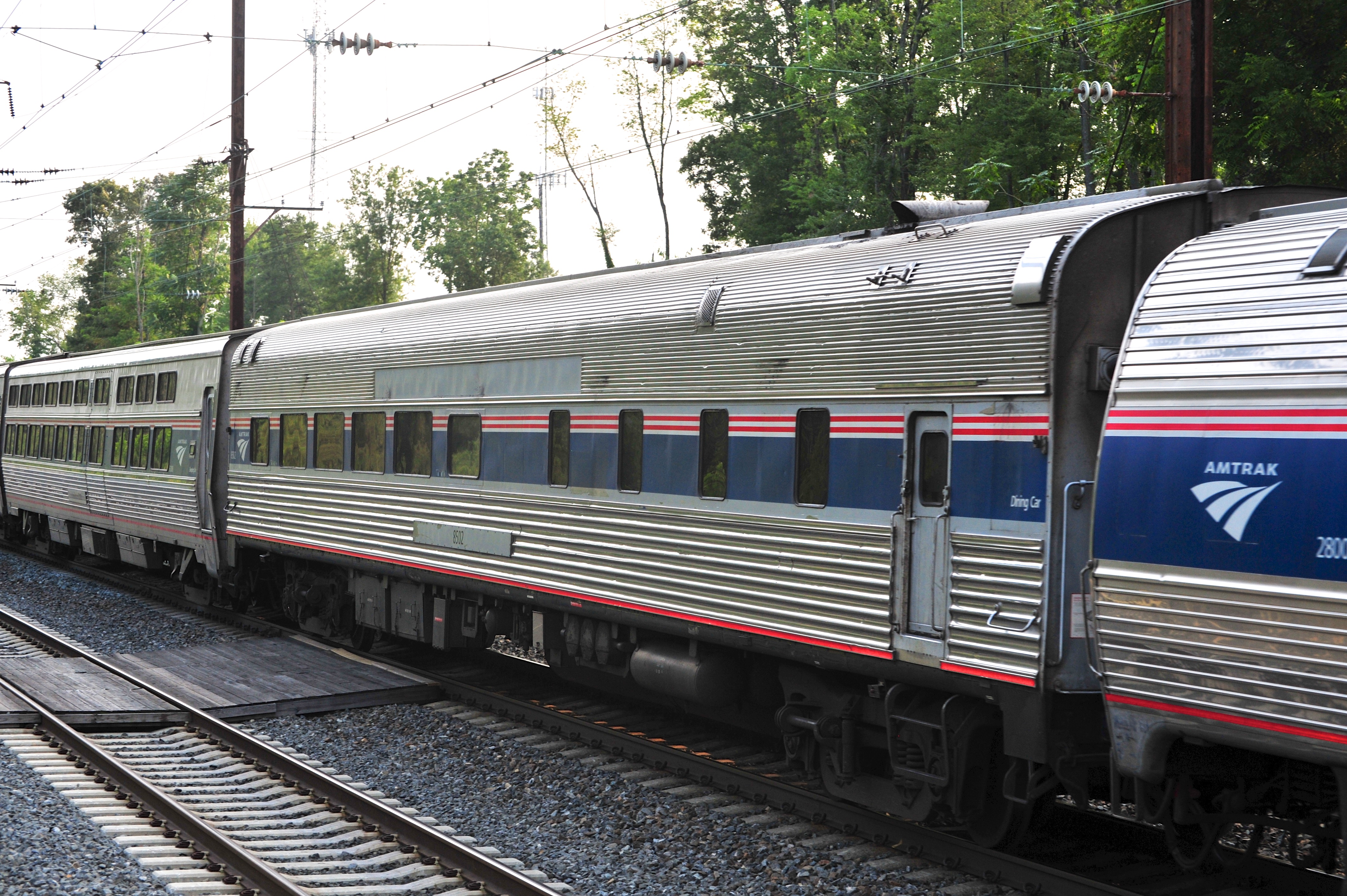
- Amtrak #8502, a former CB&Q diner, on the Silver Star in 2014

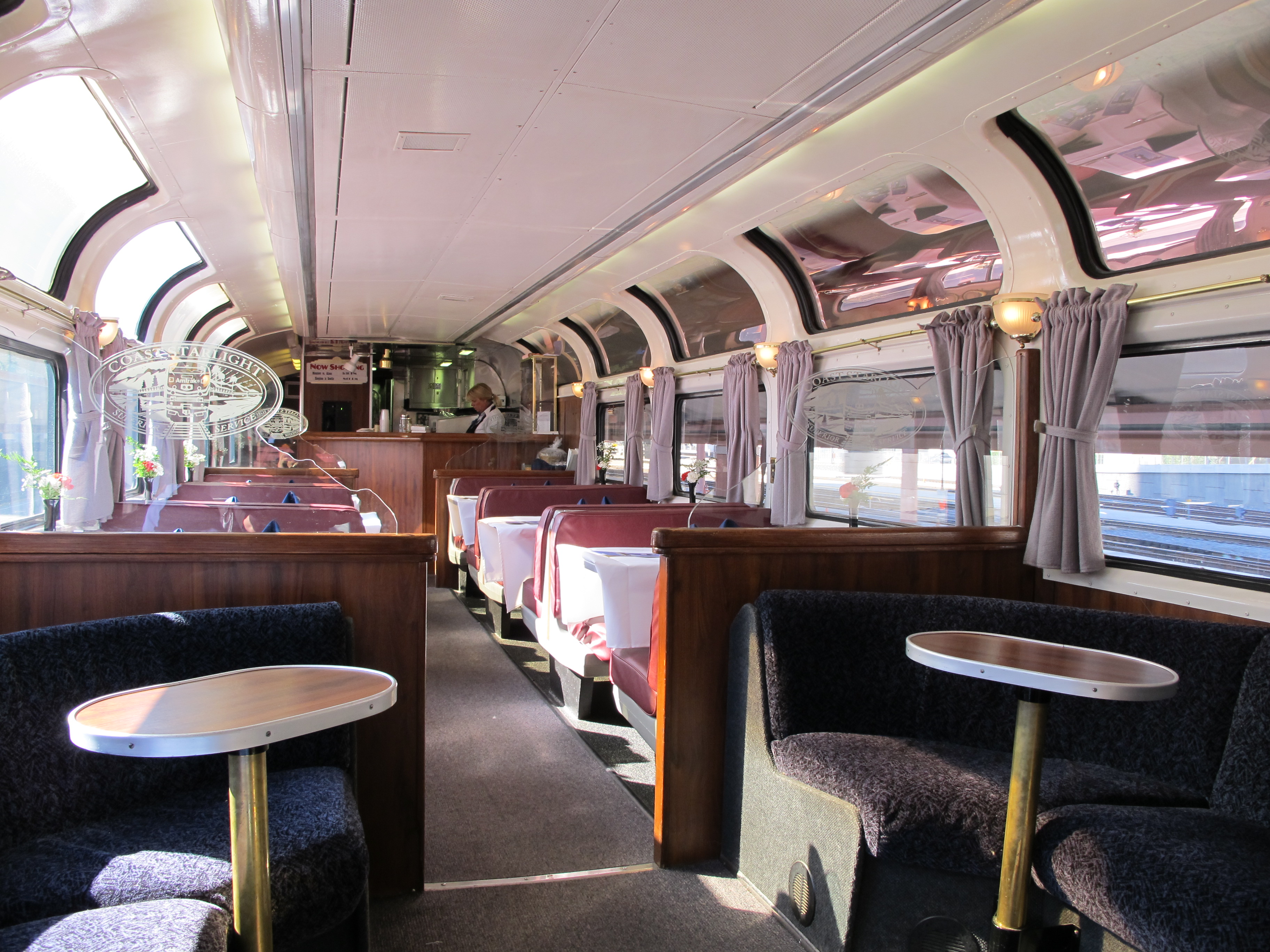
- The interior of an Amtrak Pacific Parlour Car, a refurbished ex-Santa Fe Hi-Level lounge
- In service: All retired
- Manufacturer: Budd Company, Pullman-Standard, St. Louis Car Company
- Constructed: 1946–1964
- Operators: Amtrak

Amtrak's Heritage Fleet consisted of the rolling stock provided to it when it assumed passenger service on commercial railroads. The name was applied to a 1977–1983 program that converted the older, mainly streamlined, cars from steam heating to head-end power. The final Heritage Fleet car was retired in 2019.

== History ==
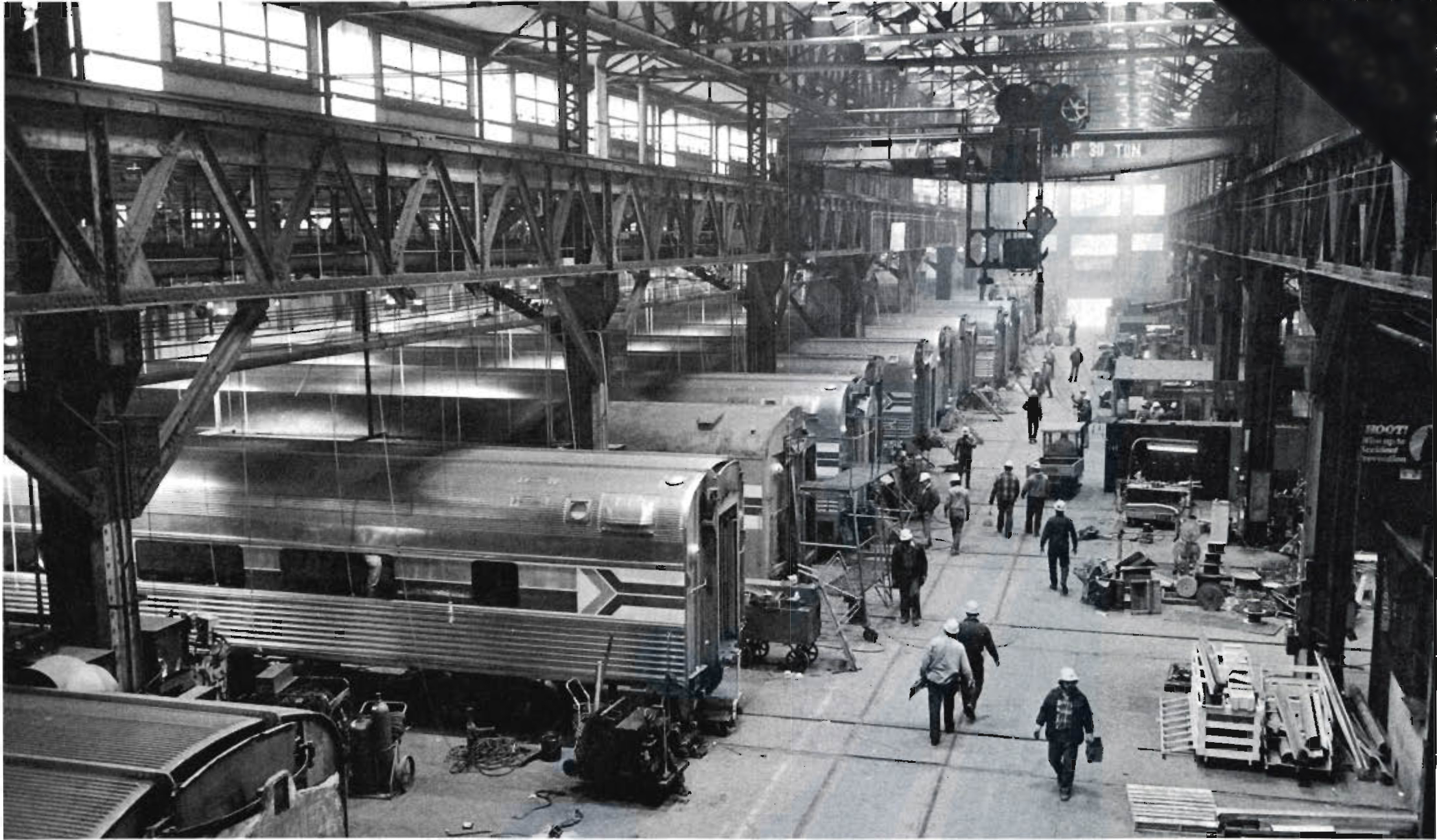
Cars undergoing conversion in 1980

When Amtrak took over most intercity passenger service in the United States in 1971, the company selected the best equipment from its predecessor railroads. Amtrak selected about 1,190 of the approximately 3,000 passenger cars available; all were air-conditioned, and over 90% were stainless steel. None of the initial cars came from Penn Central due to its bankruptcy proceedings, even though it was the source of a substantial proportion of Amtrak's initial trains. Amtrak acquired additional secondhand equipment from various railroads, including Penn Central, during the 1970s.

Amtrak used its secondhand equipment across its national system – often with cars from multiple railroads seen in a single train, creating the "Rainbow Era". This created maintenance difficulties: mechanics from one railroad were not familiar with the equipment from another. Almost all of the secondhand equipment was steam heated; only eight cars from the Keystone and 16 ex-C&NW cars had head-end power (HEP). Amtrak acquired its first large HEP fleet, the Amfleet cars, in 1975–76. The company converted 30 ex-US Army troop kitchen cars to baggage cars with HEP in 1976 to operate with Amfleet cars on the Northeast Corridor.

The unusually harsh winter of 1976–1977 sidelined much of the steam-heated fleet, causing cancellation of most Amtrak service in the Midwest for two months. The HEP-equipped Amfleet corridor cars handled the weather better; some were even pressed into service on long-distance routes. On May 26, 1977, Amtrak began a program to convert steam-heat cars to HEP at Beech Grove Shops. The rebuild cost $250,000–$400,000 per car – one-third the cost of new equipment. Beech Grove was initially to handle all 500 cars selected for HEP conversion, but 175 were overhauled elsewhere to speed the process. In a separate program, the Atchison, Topeka and Santa Fe Railway handled the conversion of the Hi-Levels in its Topeka, Kansas shops.

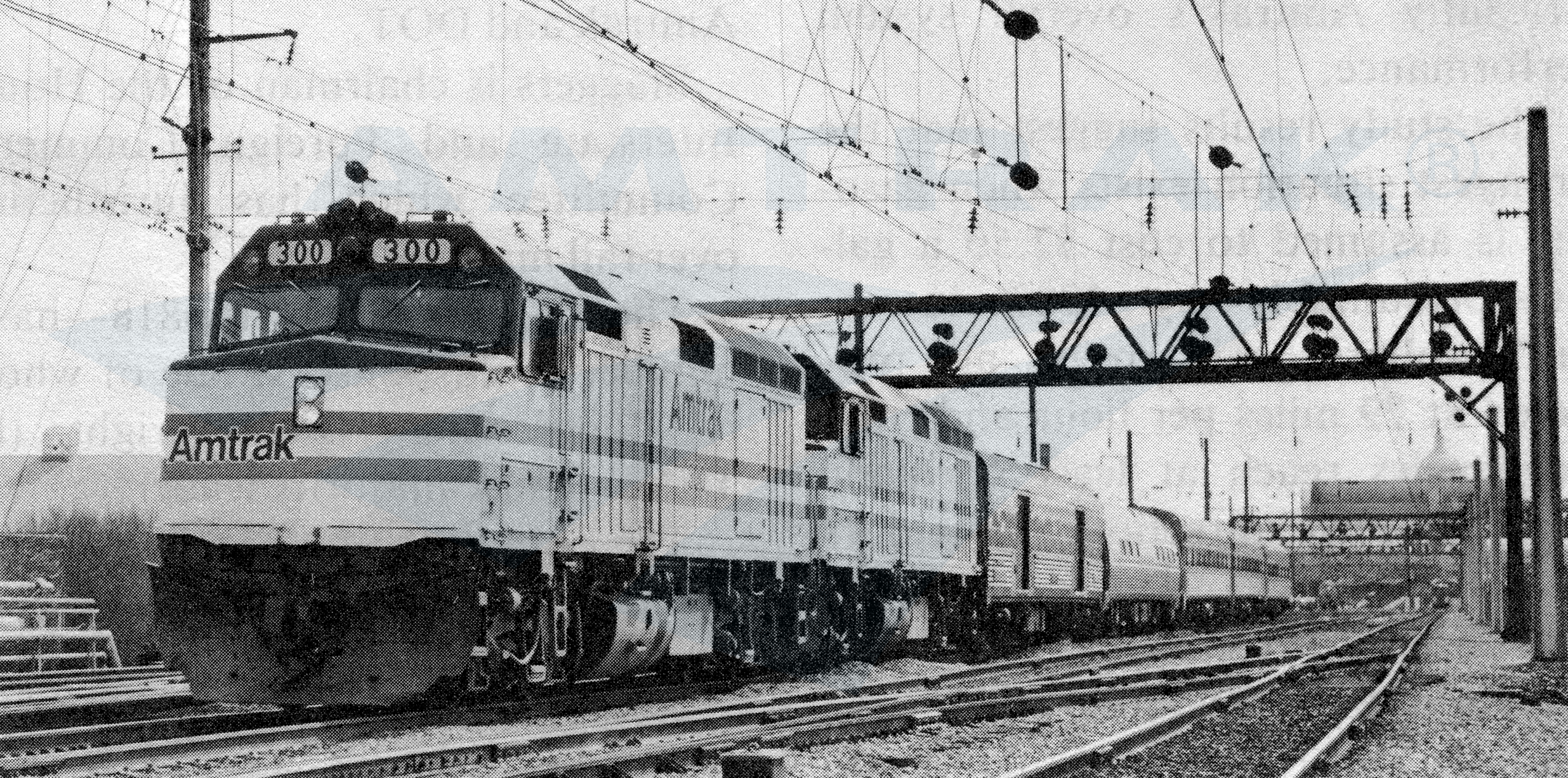
The first Broadway Limited with HEP-equipped cars in March 1980

On October 15, 1979, the Lake Shore Limited was the first Amtrak route to be permanently assigned HEP-equipped Heritage Fleet cars. The Broadway Limited followed in March–April 1980, then the Crescent and Silver Meteor in 1981. The conversion of the Silver Star on March 10, 1982, completed Amtrak's transition to HEP equipment. (Most of the western long-distance trains were converted to new Superliner equipment in 1979–1981.) The final cars from the main HEP program were completed in March 1983. A small number of cars were converted later, including several dome cars in 1984.

The HEP conversion program was intended to wring about ten additional years of service out of the aging cars. Amfleet II coaches began replacing older coaches on the Broadway Limited in 1982 and the Lake Shore Limited in 1983, and Heritage Fleet coaches were gone from the latter by 1990. Viewliner sleeping cars replaced Heritage Fleet sleepers in the 1990s. Nevertheless, some Heritage Fleet cars remained in use into the 21st century. By 2011, 101 ex-steam-heat cars remained active: 67 baggage cars, 20 dining cars, five "Pacific Parlour" Hi-Level lounge cars, one dome car, and eight non-revenue cars.

The Viewliner II cars, delivered from 2014 to 2021, replaced the remaining Heritage Fleet baggage and dining cars used on the Eastern single-level trains. The final use of the remaining Pacific Parlour cars on the Coast Starlight was on February 4, 2018. The last Heritage Fleet car in Amtrak use was a 1955-built ex-Great Northern Railway full-length dome car, Ocean View, which was manufactured in 1955. Used intermittently, it was retired in 2019 due to its age and maintenance expense.

== Roster ==
Fleet numbers	Type	Builder	Year built	Number built	Notes
1000–1006	Baggage	NSC	1957–1958	7	
1127	Baggage	ACF	1950	1	
1126, 1128–1136, 1175–1177	Baggage	P-S	1947–1957	13	
1137–1138	Baggage	ACF	1956	2	
1139	Baggage	StLC	1962	1	Wrecked in Big Bayou Canot rail accident in 1993
1140–1158	Baggage	ACF	1946–1947	13	
1159–1174	Baggage	Budd	1947–1953	16	
1178–1195	Baggage	StLC	1952–1954	17	Rebuilt from Baggage Dormitories and Lounges
1203–1249	Baggage	Budd	1953–1957	46	
1250–1272	Baggage	ACF	1950–1954	23	
1350–1379	Short Baggage	StLC	1953	30	
1450–1455	Baggage Dormitory	StLC	1952	4	
1610–1617, 1628–1633	Baggage Dormitory	StLC	1952	14	Some renumbered from 1400 series
1618–1627	Baggage Dormitory	Budd	1946–1950	9	
1700–1740	Baggage	Budd	1950–1961	39	Converted from 4000, 4600, 4700 series coaches
1750–1763	Mail Car	Budd	1950–1961	14	Converted from lower 1700 series Baggage cars
2050–2056	Slumbercoach (16 Single, 10 Double Slumbercoach)	Budd	1949	7	
2080–2097	Slumbercoach (24 Single, 8 Double Slumbercoach)	Budd	1956–1959	18	
2220–2222	Sleeper (11 Bedroom)	Budd	1952–1956	3	
2230–2235	Sleeper (11 Bedroom)	P-S	1956	6	
2430–2482	Sleeper (ADA 10 Roomette, 6 Bedroom)	Budd	1948–1952	40	
2500–2524	Dormitory Lounge	Budd	1949–1950	25	Rebuilt from 2800-2900 series sleepers
2871–2997	Sleeper (10 Roomette, 6 Bedroom)	Budd	1949–1950	36	
3100–3105	Lounge	StLC	1954	6	
3106–3127	Lounge	Budd	1948–1952	20	
4000–4023	Coach (ADA 44 Seat)	Budd	1950–1954	21	
4600–4626, 4646–4647	Coach (44 Seat)	StLC	1960–1964	29	
4627–4645, 4648–4649	Coach (44 Seat)	Budd	1950–1961	21	
4700–4742	Coach (48 Seat)	Budd	1948–1953	43	
7000–7007	Coach (ADA 85 Seat)	Budd	1952	8	
7600–7629	Coach (85 Seat)	Budd	1952–1953	29	Some cars rebuilt from 4700 series
8500–8532	Diner	Budd	1948–1958	32	Some cars rebuilt from 8700 series
8550–8559	Diner Grill	Budd	1948–1958	10	Rebuilt from lower 8500 series
8600–8603	Table Car	StLC	1960–1964	4	Rebuilt from 4600 series
8700–8716	Cafeteria	Budd	1950–1956	12	
8750–8752	Kitchen	Budd	1949	3	Rebuilt from 8500 series
9300–9302	Dome Lounge	Budd	1955	3	
9310–9312	Dome Lounge	P-S	1952	3	
9400–9412	Dome Coach	Budd	1955	13	
39900–39938	Hi-Level Transition Coach Dorm	Budd	1956–1964	37	Ex-Santa Fe, El Capitan service
39940–39964	Hi-Level Coach	Budd	1956–1964	20	Ex-Santa Fe, El Capitan service
39970–39975	Hi-Level Lounge	Budd	1956	6	Ex-Santa Fe, El Capitan service
39980–39985	Hi-Level Diner	Budd	1956	6	Ex-Santa Fe, El Capitan service

== See also ==
- Union Pacific heritage fleet
