= Viewliner =

Class of American passenger railroad cars

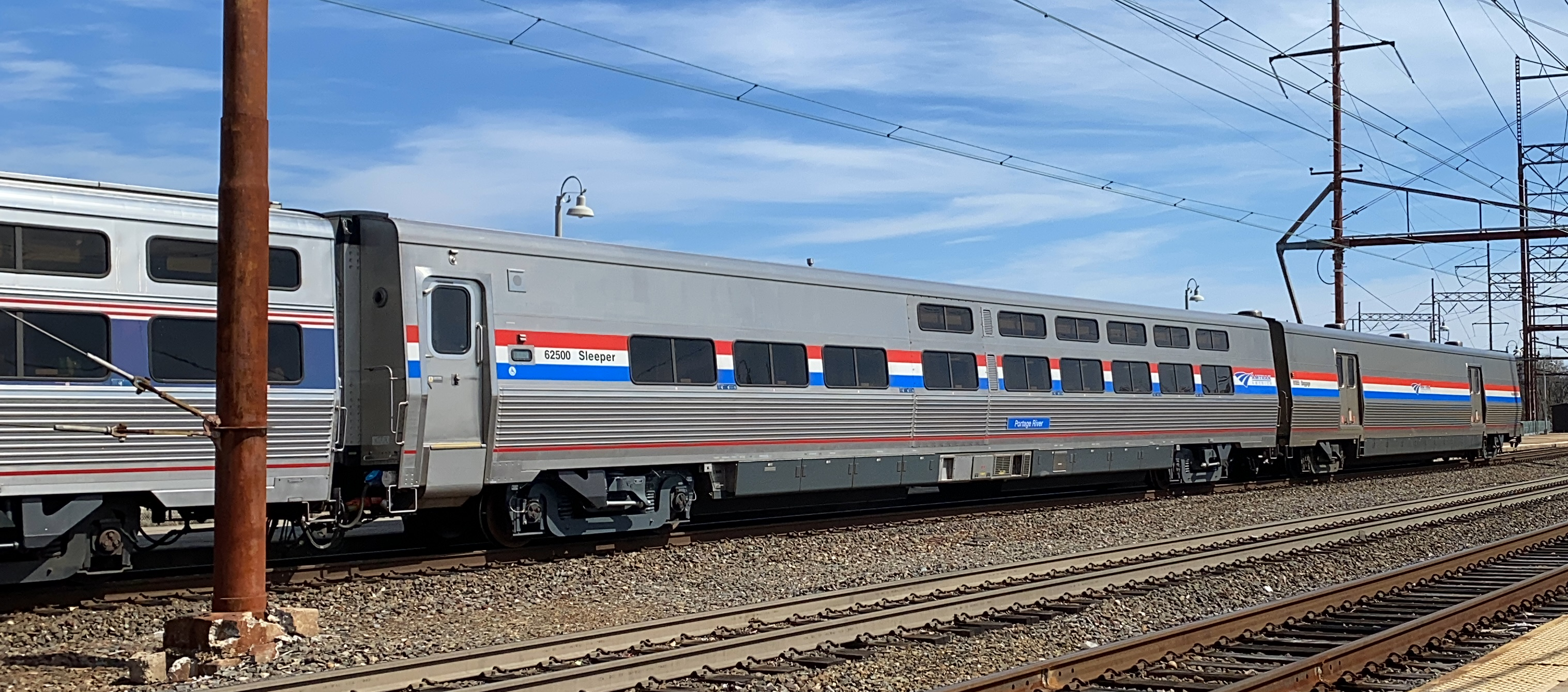
- From left: a partially visible Viewliner I sleeper, a Viewliner II sleeper and a Viewliner II baggage car

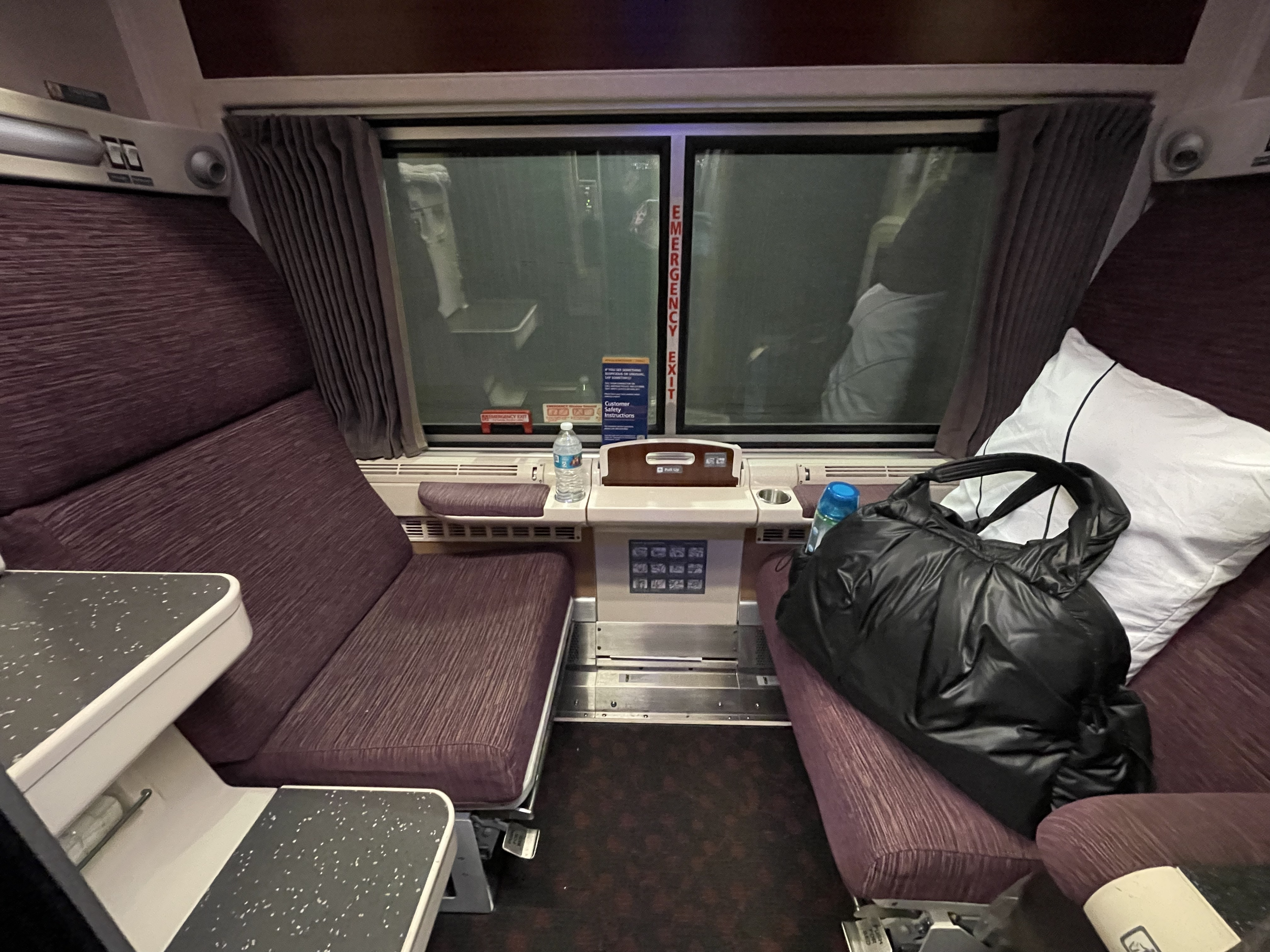
- A Viewliner II roomette
- Manufacturers: Budd Company (prototypes); Morrison-Knudsen (Viewliner I); CAF (Viewliner II)
- Constructed: Prototypes: 1987–1988; Viewliner I: 1995–1996; Viewliner II: 2012–2021
- Entered service: 1988–present
- Number built: Prototypes: 3; Viewliner I: 50; Viewliner II: 130
- Number in service: Viewliner I: 46 (October 2025); Viewliner II: 122 (October 2025)
- Fleet numbers: Prototypes: 2300, 2301 (Sleeping); 8400 (Dining); Viewliner I: 62000–62049 (Sleeping); Viewliner II: 61000–61069 (Baggage); 62500–62524 (Sleeping); 68000–68024 (Dining); 69000–69009 (Baggage/Sleeping)
- Capacity: Viewliner I sleeper: 30; Viewliner II sleeper: 28
- Operator: Amtrak

Specifications
- Car body construction: Stainless steel
- Car length: 85.33 ft (26.01 m)
- Width: 10 ft 6 in (3.20 m)
- Height: 14 ft (4.27 m)
- Floor height: 51 in (1,300 mm)
- Platform height: 51 in (1,300 mm) (high); 17 in (430 mm) (low)
- Maximum speed: Prototypes/Viewliner I: 110 mph (177 km/h); Viewliner II: 125 mph (201 km/h)
- Power supply: 480 V AC 60 Hz
- Bogies: GSI 70
- Braking system: Air
- Coupling system: AAR
- Track gauge: 4 ft 8 1/2 in (1,435 mm) standard gauge

The Viewliner is a single-level railroad car type operated by Amtrak on most long-distance routes operating east of Chicago. The Viewliner I fleet of 50 sleeping cars entered service in 1994. Several types of Viewliner II cars entered service beginning in the 2010s: 70 baggage cars entered service during 2015–2016; 25 dining cars during 2016–2019; 10 baggage–dormitory cars in 2019; and 25 sleeping cars in 2021.

The Viewliner II baggage cars are used on all Amtrak trains with full baggage cars, both single-level and bi-level, and replaced all of the Heritage Fleet baggage cars that Amtrak inherited from the freight railroads when it was established in 1971. Similarly, the Viewliner II dining cars replaced all of the Heritage Fleet dining cars.

== History ==
=== Early design ===
In the 1980s, Amtrak was looking to replace its Heritage Fleet railcars, which had been in service as far back as the 1940s. While new Superliner cars were built starting in 1979, those cars were too tall to run on Amtrak's eastern routes because of clearance issues in and around both New York Pennsylvania Station and Baltimore Pennsylvania Station.

Working with the Budd Company, Amtrak drafted plans for new single-level sleeping and dining cars that utilized a modular design where the interiors of the cars, especially the sleepers, were built in units separate from the exterior shell. These units contain all fixtures, electrical components, sewage and fresh water handling internally and are then mated with the car exterior shell upon assembly. This approach allows for easier maintenance and reconfiguration through removal and replacement of individual units. Access for this purpose is via a removable hatch on the side of the car, a distinguishing feature of the Viewliner series. Unlike the Superliners, occupants of both bunks in the bedrooms have an outside view. The design of the cars was created by Amtrak's design group, which received input from every department in the company. At the time of their introduction into service, Amtrak planned to assemble a fleet of over a thousand cars during the ten years after their introduction.

=== Prototype cars ===
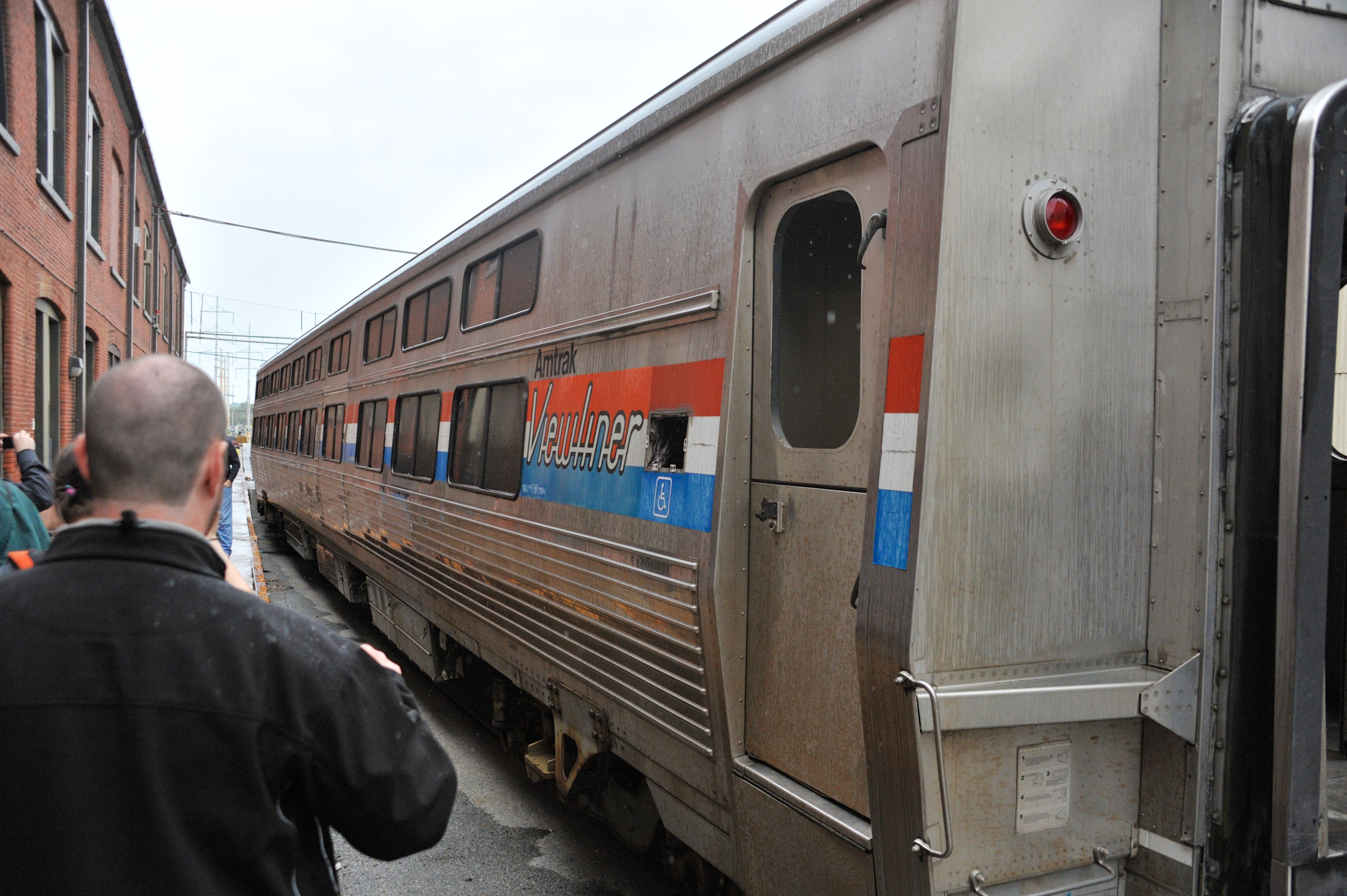
One of the prototype sleeping cars at the Wilmington, Delaware, shops in 2012 in the Phase III paint scheme

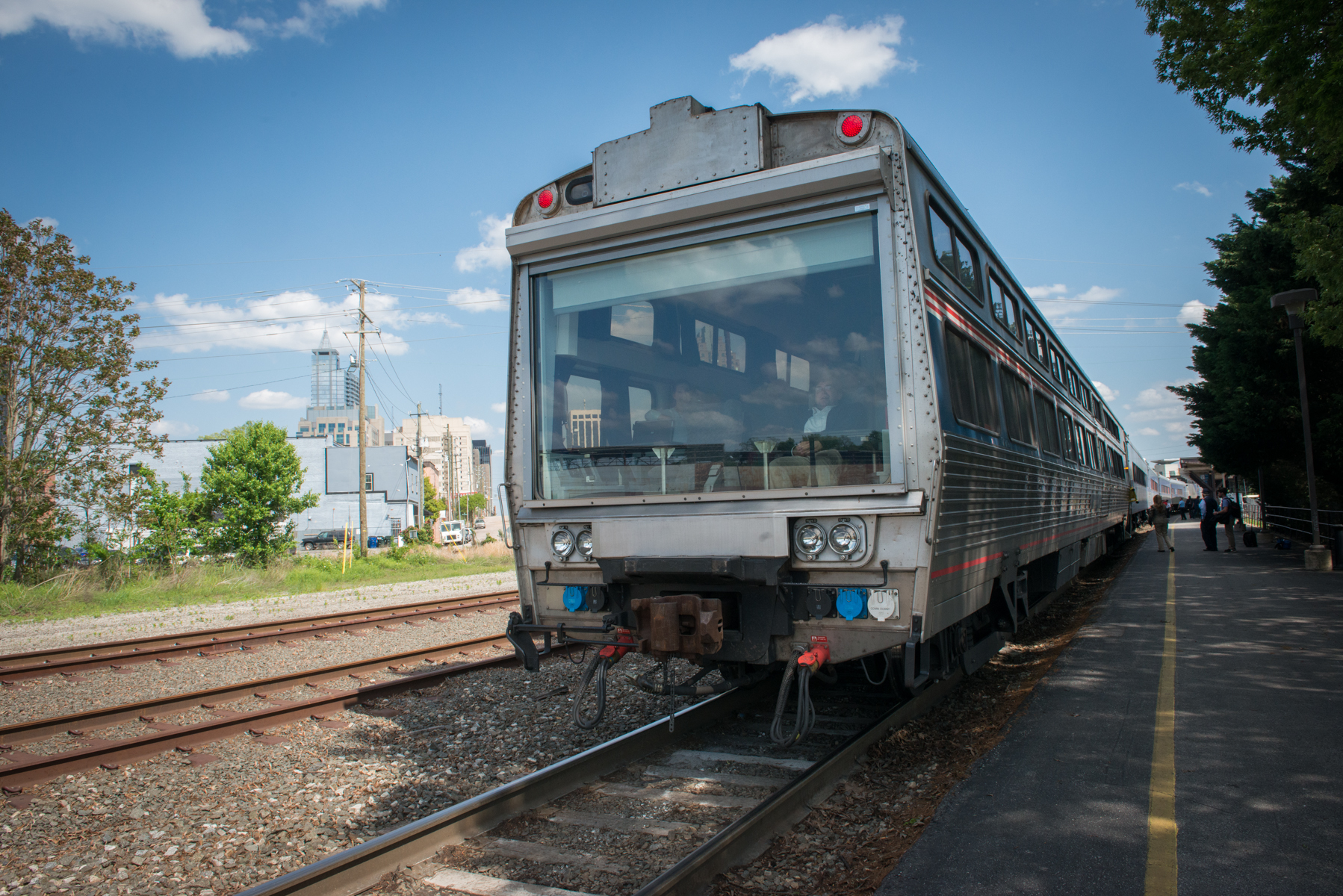
American View, Amtrak's business and inspection car, in 2015

The prototype Viewliner cars were assembled at Amtrak's Beech Grove Shops in Beech Grove, Indiana, in 1987–1988 from Budd components. Two sleeping cars (2300 and 2301) were built, as was one dining car (8400). These cars were tested on the Capitol Limited beginning in 1988. They were also tested on other trains, such as the Night Owl and the Auto Train. The prototypes were in regular service until 2002.

The prototype Viewliner dining car, number 8400, was later rebuilt with stimulus funding and restored to revenue service in October 2011 and given the name Indianapolis. Originally a prototype dining car with experimental trucks built during the Viewliner design phase in the late 1980s, the car was completely rebuilt at Amtrak's Beech Grove Shops and currently serves on Eastern long distance trains. Information learned from building and using this car was applied to the dining cars included in the new order of Viewliner II cars.

Both prototype sleepers were rebuilt into company inspection cars in the 2010s. In March 2014, number 2301 (which had been renumbered to 62091 and renamed Eastern View) was converted into an inspection car and renumbered 10004 as well as given the name American View. This inspection car has rear-facing seats and a large glass window at the end that allows passengers to observe the tracks. American View is used by maintenance crews to visually inspect the tracks for defects and by the Amtrak president and other executives for official purposes.

Number 2300 was rebuilt into a track-geometry car in October 2020.

=== Viewliner I ===
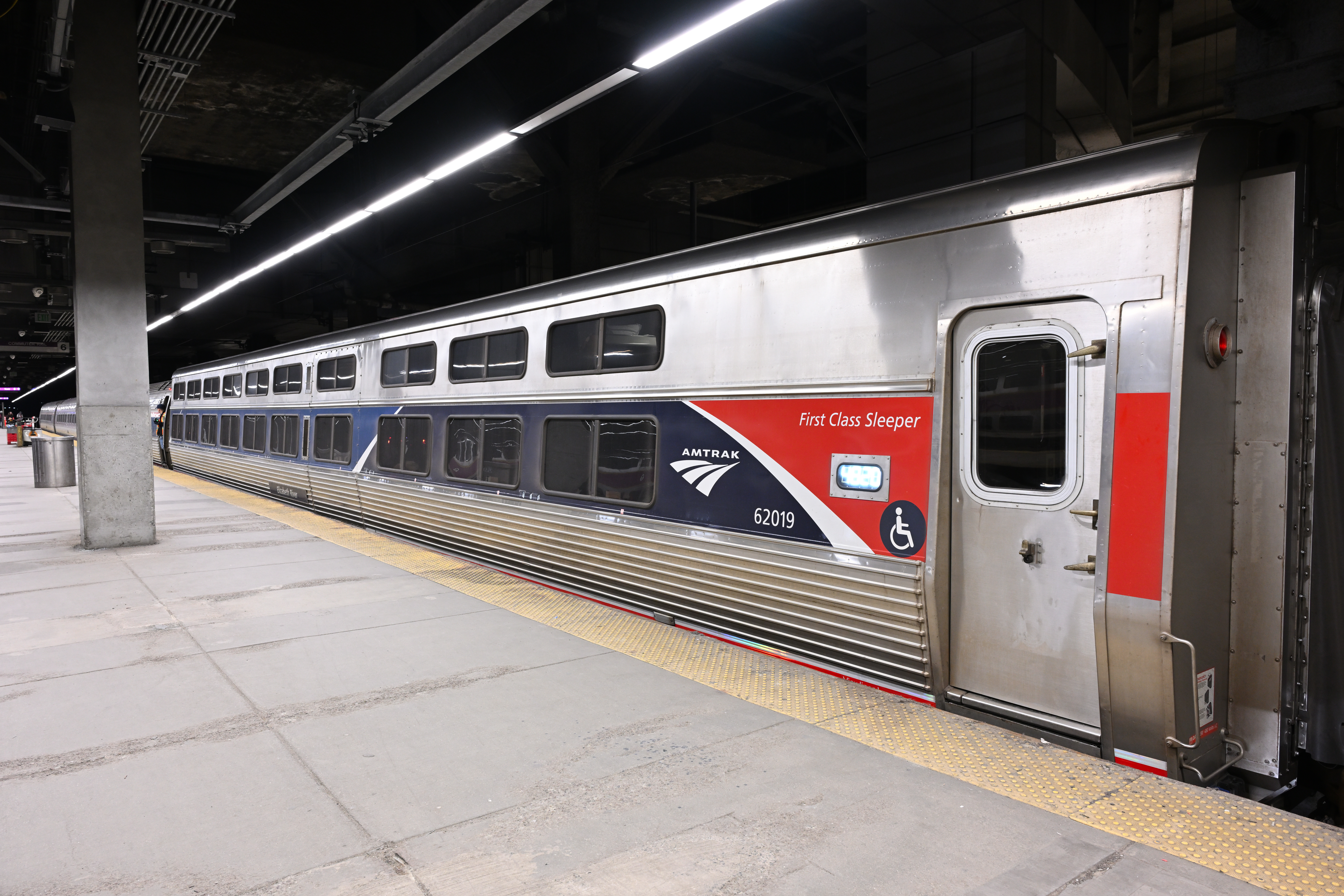
Viewliner I First Class Sleeper #62019 "Elizabeth River" in the Phase VII paint scheme, March 2025

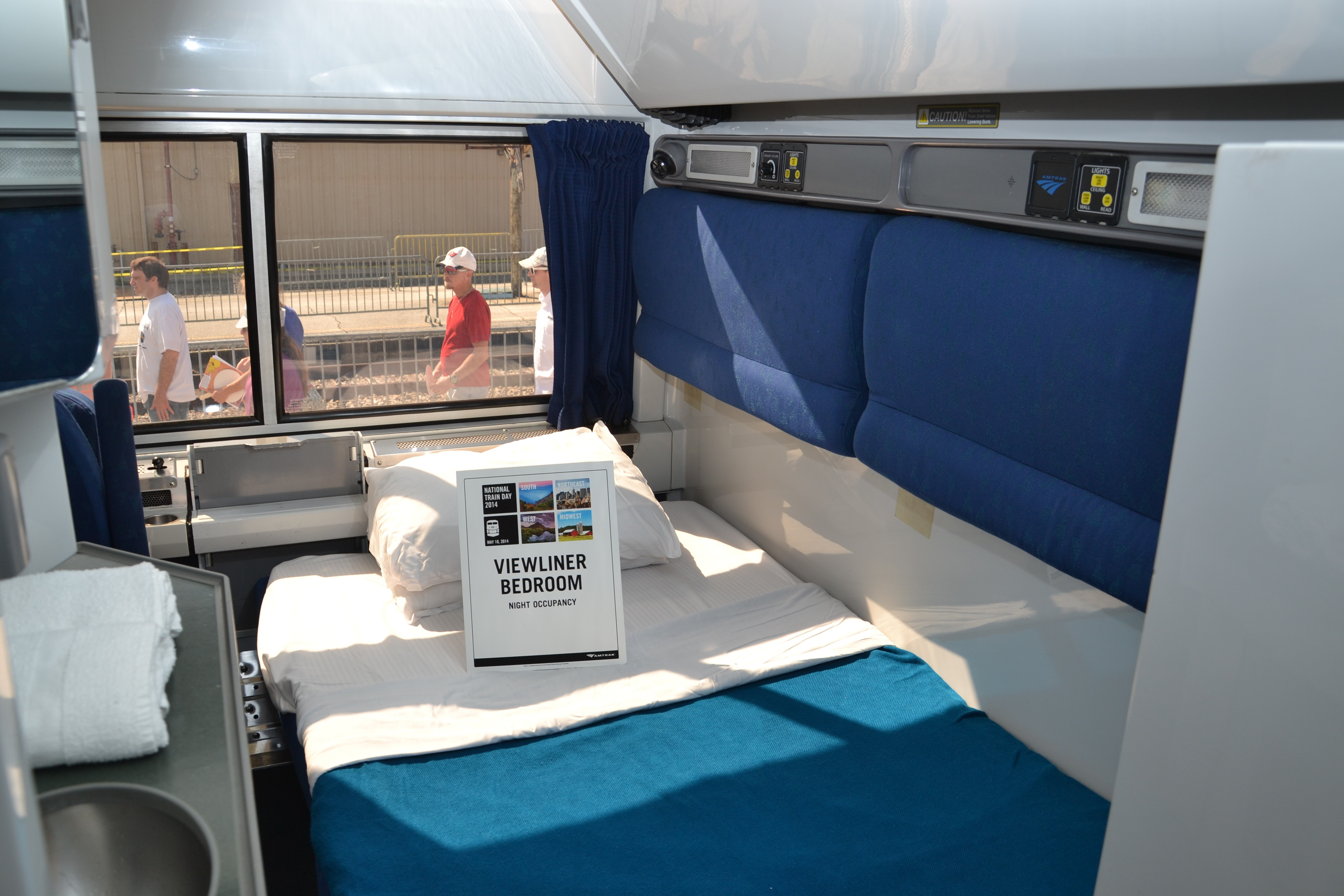
The interior of a Viewliner I sleeping car bedroom with the lower bed down in 2014

Production of the first Viewliner sleeping cars began in 1995, carried out by Amerail (now part of Alstom) and Morrison-Knudsen. Amtrak had originally envisioned a much larger procurement in the 1980s, between 500 and 600 new single-level passenger cars, including approximately 100 sleepers and the rest comprising coaches, diners, and lounges. This large-scale acquisition was intended to fully replace the aging Heritage Fleet and create trainsets composed entirely of Viewliner equipment.

Ultimately, Amtrak awarded a contract for 50 sleeping cars to Morrison-Knudsen, with an option for an additional 227 cars of various types. At the time, Morrison-Knudsen was also constructing the California Cars based on the Superliner design. The first Viewliner shell was unveiled at the company’s Chicago plant on October 26, 1994, and the first car entered service in November 1995 on the Lake Shore Limited.

After Morrison-Knudsen filed for bankruptcy, Amerail completed the outstanding orders. Final deliveries occurred in 1996, alongside the California Car fleet. Although Amtrak retained options for an additional 177 cars, none were exercised. Nonetheless, the delivery of these 50 sleepers proved timely, allowing Amtrak to retire most of its remaining Heritage sleeping cars, which faced mounting environmental pressure due to their use of non-retention toilets.

Since their introduction, Viewliner I sleepers have primarily served East Coast long-distance routes, operating alongside Amfleet coaches and Heritage diners—eventually replaced by Viewliner II diners.

As delivered, the Viewliner I cars were alphabetically named in the "View" series to emphasize their identity as a new car type, beginning with American View and finishing with Winter View. The prototype sleeper, originally numbered 2301, was renumbered to 62091 and named Eastern View at this time. These names were removed from the cars by the mid-2000s.

In 2018, when Amtrak finalized the naming convention for the Viewliner II sleeping cars, it also announced plans to rename the Viewliner I fleet. The original "View" names would be replaced with the "River" series, named alphabetically after major rivers east of the Mississippi. This new series began with Altamaha River and ended with Pearl River, intended to establish naming consistency across both generations. However, by 2023, only two Viewliner I sleepers had received new nameplates.

In 2022, Amtrak announced that they would be replacing all of their current Superliner, Amfleet II, and Viewliner I passenger cars used for long-distance service by 2032. Amtrak issued a request for information from ten manufacturers in December 2022. In December 2023 Amtrak issued a Request for Proposals (RFP) for Bi-Level equipment to replace current Superliner equipment. No concrete plans for Viewliner I and Amfleet II replacement exist yet as of March 2024.

In 2024, Amtrak launched a refurbishment program for the Viewliner I fleet to bring their interiors up to the standard of the newer Viewliner II sleepers. In 2025, Amtrak confirmed that the River names would be applied with as part of the rollout of its Phase VII paint scheme.

=== Viewliner II ===
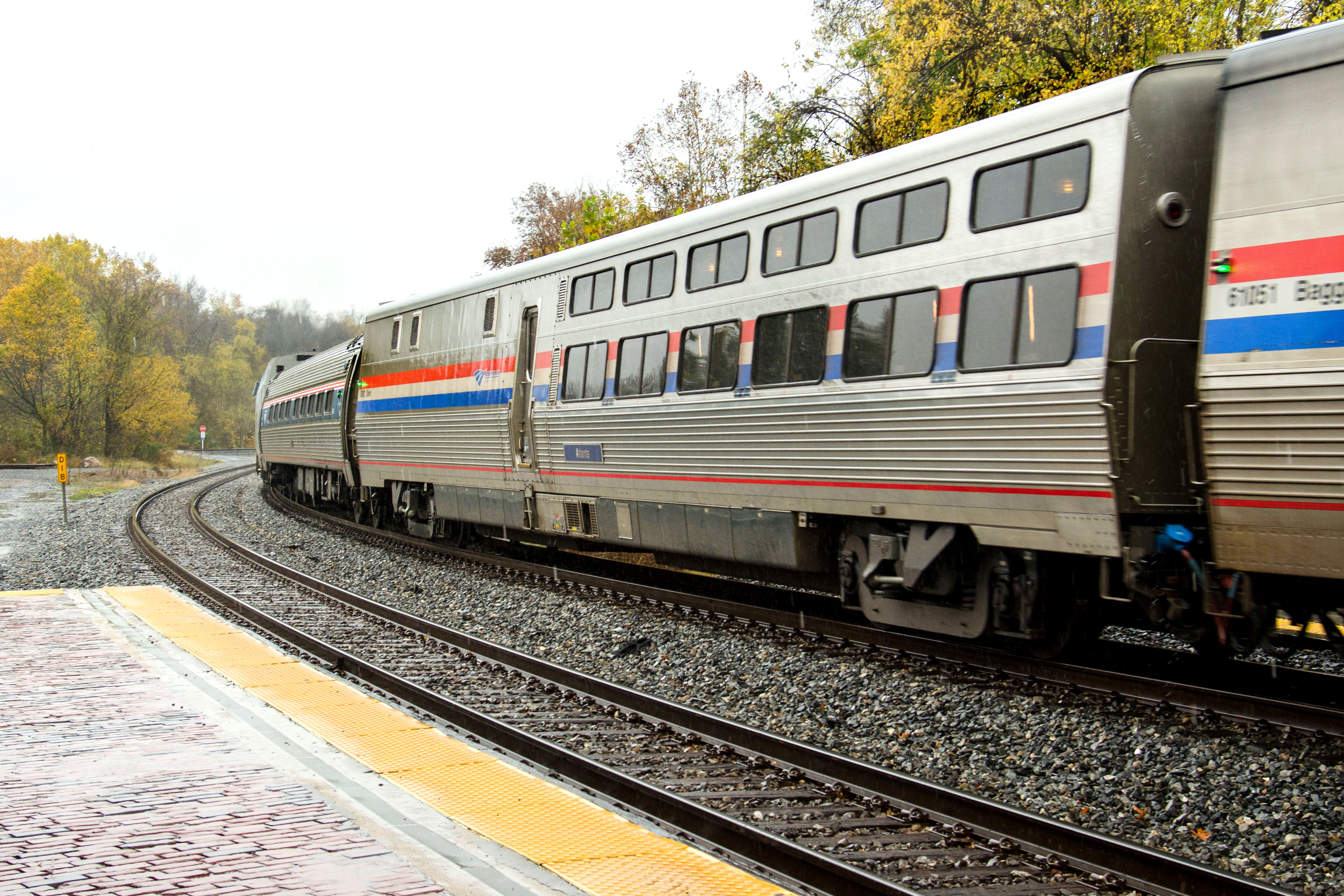
Viewliner II diner in 2017

On July 23, 2010, Amtrak ordered 130 Viewliner II cars – 55 baggage cars, 25 dining cars, 25 sleepers, and 25 baggage-dormitories – with an option for up to 70 additional cars. The five-year order, worth $298.1 million, was placed with CAF USA in Elmira, New York, a fully owned subsidiary of Construcciones y Auxiliar de Ferrocarriles. According to former Amtrak president Joseph Boardman, CAF was selected over Alstom, the only other bidder, due to CAF's lower bid and it being able to construct the entire car at its factory, rather than relying on subcontractors. In August 2014, the order was modified by swapping 15 baggage-dormitories for 15 baggage cars, changing their totals to 10 and 70, respectively.

The first car from the order was originally scheduled to roll off the assembly line in October 2012, but was delayed by more than a year, with field testing beginning in June 2014. CAF had multiple issues, including failure to detect defects in the baggage cars, and quality issues with initial construction of the diner and sleeping cars. Amtrak also experienced project management challenges in addressing these faults. While all 130 cars were originally expected to be delivered by the end of 2015, by December 2016 only the baggage cars and one diner were in service. The final cars were delivered in August 2021.

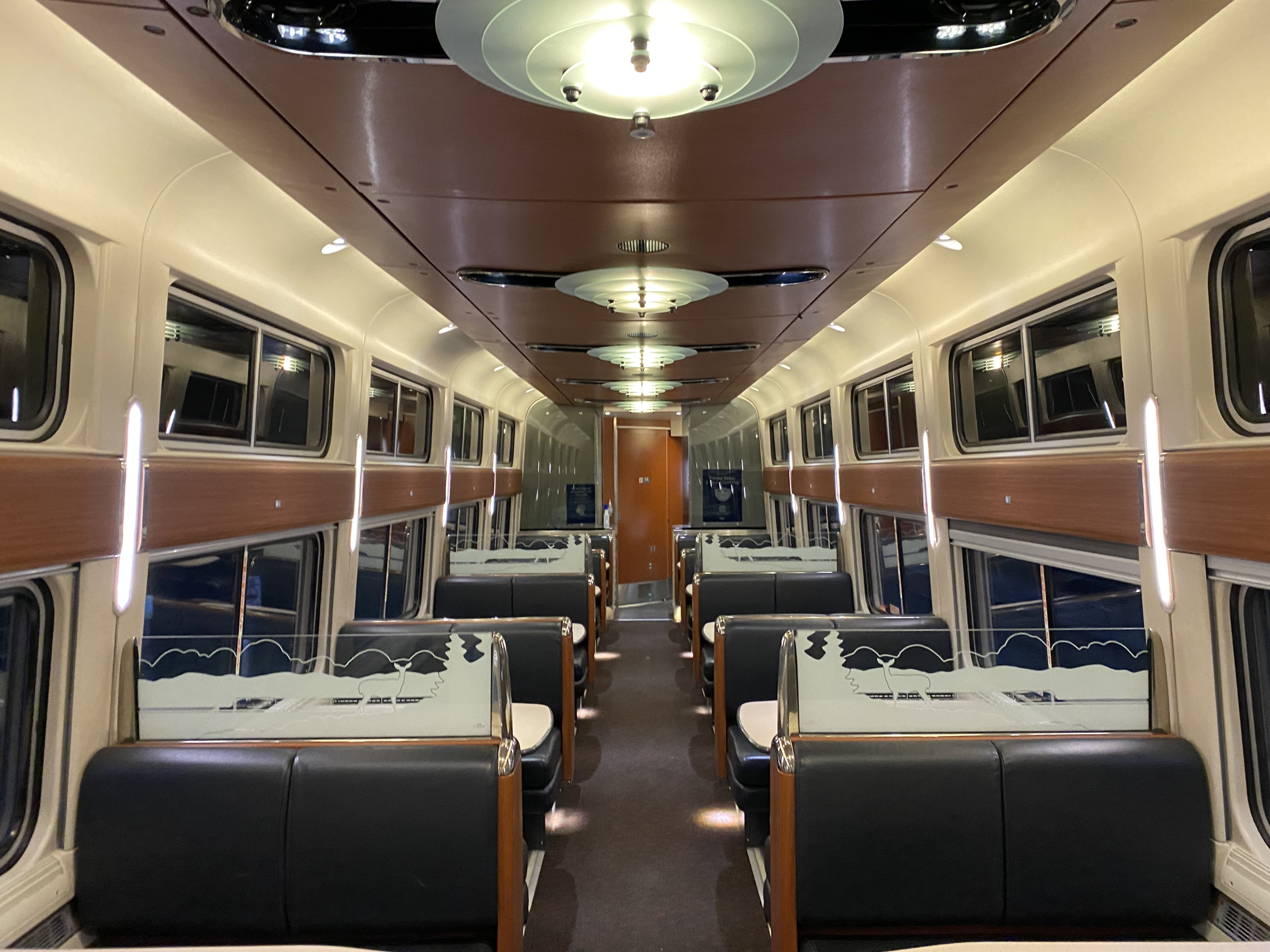
The interior of a Viewliner II diner in 2022

Viewliner II cars feature an updated version of Amtrak's older Phase III paint scheme, known as Phase IIIB. The baggage cars are numbered 61000–61069 and the baggage-dormitories are numbered 69000–69009. The dining cars, numbered 68000–68024, are named alphabetically after the first 25 state capitals east of the Mississippi River starting with Albany and finishing with Tallahassee. Prototype Viewliner I diner 8400 was rebuilt and named Indianapolis. The sleeping cars (62500–62524) are alphabetically named after major rivers east of the Mississippi, starting with Portage River and finishing with Westfield River. This continues from the planned renaming of the Viewliner I sleepers. Unlike the roomettes on Viewliner I sleepers, the Viewliner II roomettes do not have in-room toilets; instead, there are two shared restrooms. Because of this, the Viewliner II sleepers have one fewer roomette than the Viewliner I sleepers – 11 versus 12.

== Service ==
Viewliner passenger cars are designed for use on Amtrak's long-distance routes in the Eastern United States: the Cardinal, Crescent, Floridian, Lake Shore Limited, and Silver Meteor. This is due to clearance restrictions in and around New York Pennsylvania Station and Baltimore Pennsylvania Station that prevent tall bi-level cars from clearing the tunnels.

Viewliner baggage cars are used on all Superliner and single-level trains which use full baggage cars on the Amtrak system. The first Viewliner baggage cars entered service on March 23, 2015 on multiple Eastern routes, with the last entering service in December 2016.
