= Amtrak Express =

American intercity shipping service

Amtrak Express is Amtrak's freight and shipping service. It handles small package express service, heavy freight shipments and city-to-city freight shipping by private and commercial customers. Boxes up to 36" x 36" x 36" (maximum 50 pounds), suitcases, and boxed bicycles are acceptable, but numerous classes of fragile, valuable and hazardous items are not permitted. Large pallet shipments of up to 500 pounds (227 kg) are accepted at certain major stations. Quoted transit times range from 2 to 7 days depending on distance and service frequency.

The service has been suspended since 2020.

== Express service types ==
Service is available between most Amtrak stations that handle checked baggage (over 130 cities). Service and hours vary widely by station, limited by available equipment and security considerations, and service is not available on all days at all stations.

- Light Express (LEX)
  - Smaller stations with limited storage space that handle shipments of up to 250 pounds. Each piece may not exceed 36" x 36" x 36" in size or 50 pounds in weight.
- Regular Express (REX)
  - The majority of Amtrak stations that handles small packages. Shipments to/from Regular Express stations are limited to 500 pounds (227 kg) total. Each piece may not exceed 36" x 36" x 36" in size or 50 pounds in weight.
- Heavy Express (HEX)
  - Larger stations with forklifts or pallet jacks that can handle palletized shipments. Each piece may not exceed 36" x 36" x 36" in size or 50 pounds in weight. Pallets may not exceed 60" x 48" x 60" or 500 pounds.

== Prohibited items ==
The following prohibited items are not acceptable for shipment under any circumstances:

- Animals
- Appliances (larger items such as air conditioners, microwave ovens, etc.)
- Cameras and Photographic Accessories
- Controlled or Illegal Substances
- Dangerous or Hazardous Items (acidic or corrosive substances, ammunition, batteries containing acid, explosive, fireworks, flammable items, poison, radioactive materials, etc.)
- Electronic Equipment (radios, stereos, tape recorders, televisions, video cameras, video game systems, etc.)
- Eyeglasses or Contact Lenses
- Fragile Articles (antiques, art works, china, clocks, glassware, watches, etc.)
- Furniture or Mattresses
- Guns
- Liquids (except for properly packaged blood and plasma shipments by hospitals and laboratories)
- Medications and Prescriptions
- Motorized Vehicles and Engines
- Office-type Equipment (calculators, computers, printers, telephones, typewriters, etc.)
- Perishable Items (flowers, food, plants, etc.)
- Playground Equipment (swing sets, etc.)
- Poles used in pole vaulting
- Sailboards with Masts
- Valuable Items (credit cards, coin or stamp collections, gems and minerals, irreplaceable papers, photos or manuscripts, jewelry, money, stamps, stock certificates, watches, etc.)
- Any other overweight item, or an item unsuitably packed or too fragile to withstand normal handling.

== Human remains ==
Amtrak accepts human remains at many stations that handle Amtrak Express. Undertakers must make prior arrangements with the Amtrak Express Desk.
