= List of preserved Amtrak rolling stock =

A large quantity of rolling stock formerly owned and operated by the National Railroad Passenger Corporation, known today as "Amtrak", have been preserved in museums, on tourist railroads, and various other locations all across North America. This list this also includes preserved rolling stock from Amtrak Cascades.

== Preserved diesel locomotives ==
Image	Number	Build date	Builder	Model	Wheel arrangement	Disposition and location	Notes	References
	231	September 1977	Electro-Motive Division (EMD)	F40PHR	B-B	Operational at the Illinois Railway Museum (IRM) in Union, Illinois		
	237	August 1977	Electro-Motive Division (EMD)	F40PHR	B-B	Operational at the Grand Canyon Railway (GCRY) in Williams, Arizona		
	239	August 1977	Electro-Motive Division (EMD)	F40PHR	B-B	Operational at the Grand Canyon Railway (GCRY) in Williams, Arizona		
	281	April 1978	Electro-Motive Division (EMD)	F40PHR	B-B	Operational at the California State Railroad Museum (CSRM) in Sacramento, California		
	295	June 1979	Electro-Motive Division (EMD)	F40PHR	B-B	Operational at the Grand Canyon Railway (GCRY) in Williams, Arizona		
	307	May 1979	Electro-Motive Division (EMD)	F40PH	B-B	Stored at the North Carolina Transportation Museum in Spencer, North Carolina		
	315	August 1979	Electro-Motive Division (EMD)	F40PH	B-B	To be displayed at the Nevada State Railroad Museum Boulder City in Boulder City, Nevada		
	380	July 1981	Electro-Motive Division (EMD)	F40M-2F	B-B	Operational at the Western Maryland Scenic Railroad (WMSR) in Cumberland, Maryland		
	434	April 1956	Electro-Motive Division (EMD)	E9A	A1A-A1A	Operational, owned by the Friends of the 261 in Minneapolis, Minnesota.		
	456	April 1950	Electro-Motive Division (EMD)	E8A	A1A-A1A	Undergoing restoration at the Railway Museum of Greater Cincinnati in Covington, Kentucky		
	488	October 1957	Electro-Motive Division (EMD)	FL9	B-A1A	Operational, owned by Webb Rail		
	489	October 1957	Electro-Motive Division (EMD)	FL9	B-A1A	Operational, owned by Webb Rail		
	497	March 1951	Electro-Motive Division (EMD)	E8A	A1A-A1A	Operational on the St. Louis, Iron Mountain and Southern Railway in Jackson, Missouri		
	498	January 1951	Electro-Motive Division (EMD)	E8A	A1A-A1A	Owned by the Juniata Terminal Company		
	499	October 1952	Electro-Motive Division (EMD)	E8A	A1A-A1A	Owned by the Juniata Terminal Company		
	644	August 1974	Electro-Motive Division (EMD)	SDF40-2	C-C	Operational at the Illinois Railway Museum (IRM) in Union, Illinois		
	669	October 1955	Electro-Motive Division (EMD)	E9A	A1A-A1A	Stored at the Union Pacific Railroad shops in Cheyenne, Wyoming		
	4037	August 1961	Electro-Motive Division (EMD)	E9A	A1A-A1A	On static display at the Louisiana Steam Train Association in New Orleans, Louisiana		

== Preserved electric locomotives ==
Image	Number	Build date	Builder	Model	Wheel arrangement	Disposition and location	Notes	References
	502	July 1963	General Electric (GE)	E44	C-C	On static display at the Railroad Museum of Pennsylvania in Strasburg, Pennsylvania		
	603	June 1976	General Electric (GE)	E60MA	C-C	On static display at the Railroad Museum of Pennsylvania in Strasburg, Pennsylvania		
	915	January 1981	Electro-Motive Division (EMD)	AEM-7DC	B-B	On static display at the Railroad Museum of Pennsylvania in Strasburg, Pennsylvania		
	917	1981	Electro-Motive Division (EMD)	AEM-7DC	B-B	Awaiting cosmetic restoration at the Danbury Railroad Museum (DRM) in Danbury, Connecticut		
	927	1981	Electro-Motive Division (EMD)	AEM-7DC	B-B	Stored, owned by the Northeast Rail Heritage Inc.		
	945	April 1982	Electro-Motive Division (EMD)	AEM-7AC	B-B	On static display at the Illinois Railway Museum (IRM) in Union, Illinois		
	958	November 1975	General Electric (GE)	E60CH	C-C	Stored at the United Railroad Historical Society of New Jersey in Boonton, New Jersey		

== Preserved passenger cars ==
Image	Number	Build date	Builder	Model	Car type	Disposition and location	Notes	References
	2090	September 1959	Budd Company	Slumbercoach	Sleeper car	Operational at the Museum of the American Railroad in Frisco, Texas		
	2092	1959	Budd Company	Slumbercoach	Sleeper car	Stored at the Southeastern Railway Museum in Duluth, Georgia		
	7304	1995	Talgo	Talgo Series VI	Bistro car	Stored at the Northwest Railway Museum (NRM) in Snoqualmie, Washington		
	8530	1952	Budd Company	1-drawing room-29-seat Lounge car	Diner car	Operational at the Kentucky Railway Museum in New Haven, Kentucky		
	9466	1955	Budd Company	46 seat Great Dome Coach	Dome car	Operational at the Grand Canyon Railway (GCRY) in Williams, Arizona	Currently numbered 2097 and named "Kokopelli"	

== Formerly preserved, scrapped ==
Number	Build date	Builder	Model	Last seen	Scrap date	Cause of scrapping	Notes	References
495	September 1952	Electro-Motive Division (EMD)	E8A	Grants Mill Station in Irondale, Alabama	2021	Sat at a parking lot of a strip mall; strip mall decided to remove it for the needs of a new parking lot		
