= Amtrak =

American intercity passenger rail operator

National Railroad Passenger Corporation (Amtrak)

- Amtrak system as of August 2025

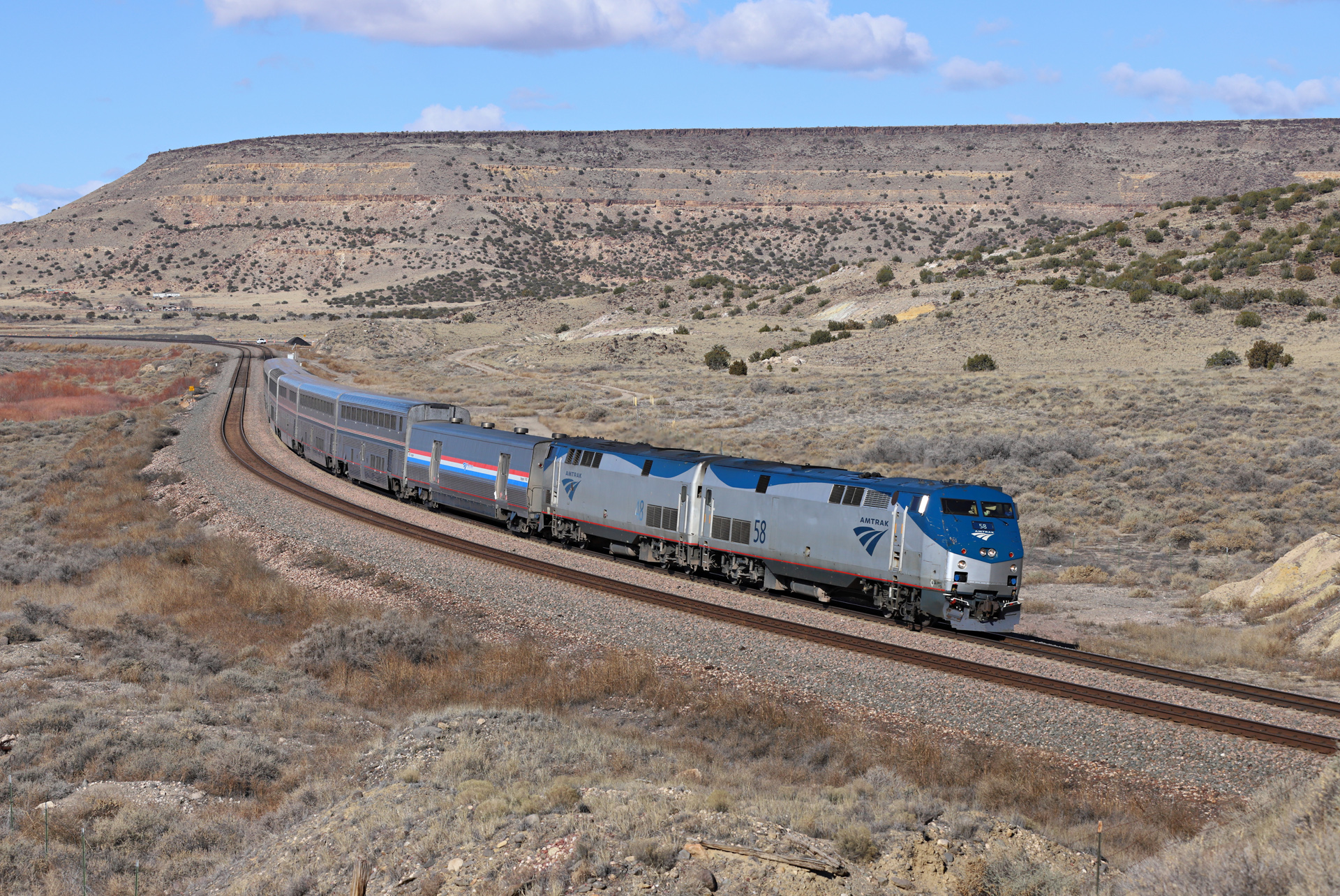
- The Southwest Chief, one of Amtrak's long-distance trains in the Western United States, in Laguna, New Mexico

Overview
- Headquarters: 1 Massachusetts Ave. NW; Washington, D.C., U.S.
- Key people: William “Byl” Hermann (President)
- Reporting mark: AMTK and AMTZ; IATA code: 2V
- Locale: Contiguous United States (except South Dakota and Wyoming); British Columbia, Ontario, and Quebec in Canada
- Dates of operation: May 1, 1971–present
- Predecessors: 20 privately operated intercity passenger rail systems

Technical
- Track gauge: 4 ft 8 1/2 in (1,435 mm) standard gauge
- Electrification: 12 kV, 25 Hz AC: Northeast Corridor (Washington–New York) and Keystone Corridor; 12.5 kV, 60 Hz AC: Northeast Corridor (New York–New Haven); 25 kV, 60 Hz AC: Northeast Corridor (New Haven–Boston)
- Length: Routes: 21,400 mi (34,400 km); Track owned: 623 mi (1,003 km)

Other
- Website: amtrak.com

The National Railroad Passenger Corporation, doing business as Amtrak (/ˈæmtræk/; reporting marks AMTK, AMTZ), is the national passenger railroad company of the United States. It operates intercity rail service in every contiguous U.S. state except for Wyoming and South Dakota as well as in three Canadian provinces. Amtrak is a portmanteau of the words America and track.

Founded in 1971 as a quasi-public corporation to operate many U.S. passenger rail routes, Amtrak receives a combination of state and federal subsidies but is managed as a for-profit organization. The company's headquarters is located one block west of Union Station in Washington, D.C. Amtrak is headed by a Board of Directors, two of whom are the secretary of transportation and chief executive officer (CEO) of Amtrak, while the other eight members are nominated to serve a term of five years.

Amtrak's network includes 535 stations along 21,400 miles (34,400 km) of track.It directly owns approximately 623 miles (1,003 km) of this track and operates an additional 132 miles (212 km) of track; the remaining mileage is over rail lines owned by other railroad companies. While most track speeds are limited to 79 mph (127 km/h), several lines have been upgraded to support top speeds of 110 mph (180 km/h), and parts of the Northeast Corridor support top speeds of 160 mph (260 km/h).

In fiscal year 2025, Amtrak served 34.5 million passengers and had $2.7 billion in adjusted ticket revenue, with more than 22,100 employees. Nearly two-thirds of passengers come from the 10 largest metropolitan areas and 83% of passengers travel on routes shorter than 400 miles (645 km).

== History ==
=== Private passenger service ===
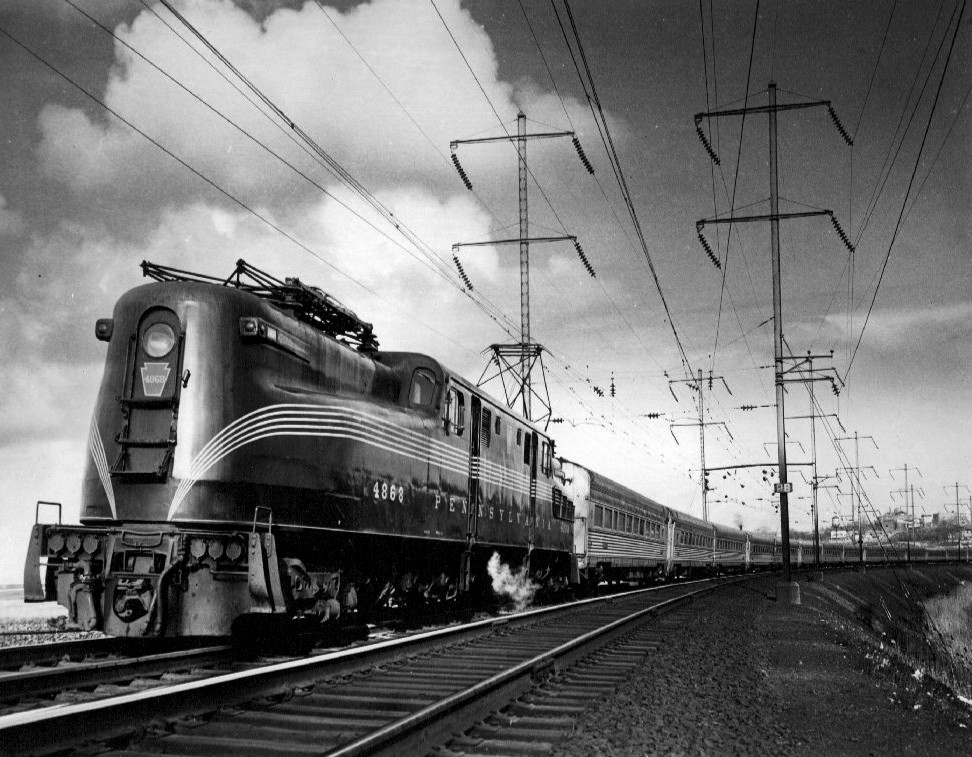
The Pennsylvania Railroad's Congressional in the 1960s

In 1916, 98% of all commercial intercity travelers in the United States moved by rail, and the remaining 2% moved by inland waterways. Nearly 42 million passengers used railways as primary transportation. Passenger trains were owned and operated by the same privately owned companies that operated freight trains. As the 20th century progressed, patronage declined in the face of competition from buses, air travel, and the car. New streamlined diesel-powered trains, such as the Pioneer Zephyr, were popular with the traveling public but could not reverse the trend. By 1940, railroads held 67 percent of commercial passenger-miles in the United States. In real terms, passenger-miles had fallen by 40% since 1916, from 42 billion to 25 billion.

Traffic surged during World War II, aided by troop movement and gasoline rationing. The railroad's market share surged to 74% in 1945, with a massive 94 billion passenger-miles. After the war, railroads rejuvenated their overworked and neglected passenger fleets with fast and luxurious streamliners. These new trains brought only temporary relief to the overall decline. Even as postwar travel exploded, passenger travel percentages of the overall market share fell to 46% by 1950, and then 32% by 1957. The railroads had lost money on passenger service since the Great Depression, but deficits reached $723 million in 1957. For many railroads, these losses threatened financial viability.

The causes of this decline were heavily debated. The National Highway System and airports, both funded by the government, competed directly with the railroads, which, unlike the airline, bus, and trucking companies, paid for their own infrastructure. American car culture was also on the rise in the post–World War II years. Progressive Era rate regulation limited the railroads' ability to turn a profit. Railroads also faced antiquated work rules and inflexible relationships with trade unions. To take one example, workers continued to receive a day's pay for 100-to-150-mile (160 to 240 km) workdays. Streamliners covered that in two hours.

Matters approached a crisis in the 1960s. Passenger service route-miles fell from 107,000 miles (172,000 km) in 1958 to 49,000 miles (79,000 km) in 1970, the last full year of private operation. The diversion of most United States Post Office Department mail from passenger trains to trucks, airplanes, and freight trains in late 1967 deprived those trains of badly needed revenue. In direct response, the Atchison, Topeka and Santa Fe Railway filed to discontinue 33 of its remaining 39 trains, ending almost all passenger service on one of the largest railroads in the country. The equipment the railroads had ordered after World War II was now 20 years old, worn out, and in need of replacement.

=== Formation ===
Rail Passenger Service Act of 1970
- Long title: An act to provide financial assistance for and establishment of a national rail passenger system, to provide for the modernization of railroad passenger equipment, to authorize the prescribing of minimum standards for railroad passenger service, to amend section 13a of the Interstate Commerce Act, and for other purposes.
- Enacted by: the 91st United States Congress

Citations
- Public law: Pub. L. 91–518
- Statutes at Large: 84 Stat. 1327

Codification
- Acts amended: Interstate Commerce Act

Legislative history
- Introduced in the House as H.R. 17849 on May 27, 1970; Committee consideration by House Interstate and Foreign Commerce; Passed the House on October 14, 1970; Passed the Senate on October 14, 1970; Signed into law by President Richard Nixon on October 30, 1970

As passenger service declined, various proposals were brought forward to rescue it. The 1961 Doyle Report proposed that the private railroads pool their services into a single body. Similar proposals were made in 1965 and 1968 but failed to attract support. The federal government passed the High Speed Ground Transportation Act of 1965 to fund pilot programs in the Northeast Corridor, but this did nothing to address passenger deficits. In late 1969, multiple proposals emerged in the United States Congress, including equipment subsidies, route subsidies, and, lastly, a "quasi-public corporation" to take over the operation of intercity passenger trains. Matters were brought to a head on June 21, 1970, when the Penn Central, the largest railroad in the Northeastern United States and teetering on bankruptcy, filed to discontinue 34 of its passenger trains.

In October 1970, Congress passed, and President Richard Nixon signed into law (against the objections of most of his advisors), the Rail Passenger Service Act. Proponents of the bill, led by the National Association of Railroad Passengers (NARP), sought government funding to ensure the continuation of passenger trains. They conceived the National Railroad Passenger Corporation (NRPC), a quasi-public corporation that would be managed as a for-profit organization, but which would receive taxpayer funding and assume operation of intercity passenger trains – while many involved in drafting the bill did not believe the NRPC would actually be profitable, this was necessary in order for the White House and more conservative members of Congress to support the bill.

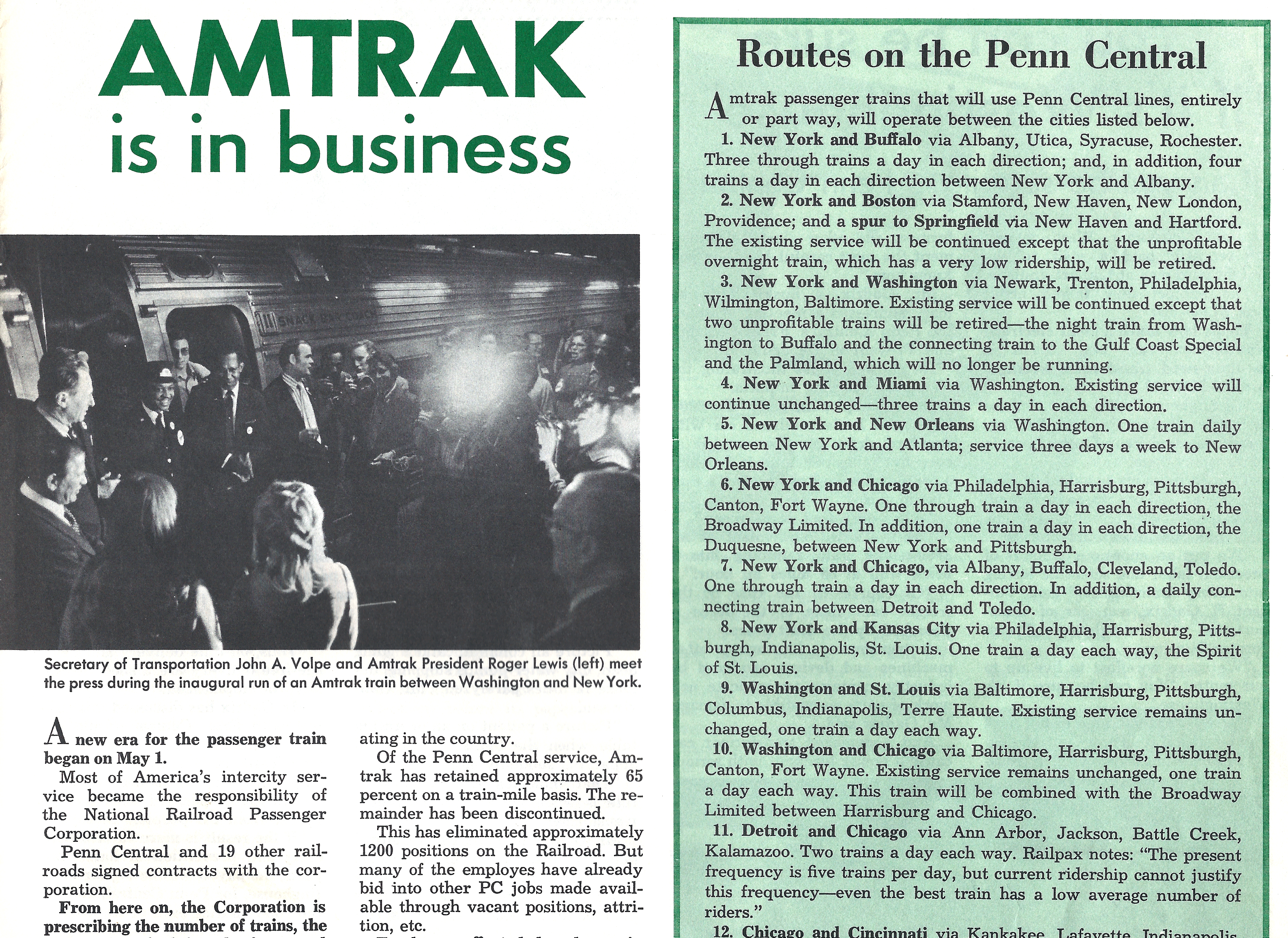
Penn Central Railroad's employee publication announcing the inauguration of Amtrak on May 1, 1971. Penn Central Amtrak routes are listed.

There were several key provisions:

- Any railroad operating intercity passenger service could contract with the NRPC, thereby joining the national system.
- The United States federal government, through the Secretary of Transportation, would own all of the NRPC's issued and outstanding preferred stock.
- Participating railroads bought into the NRPC using a formula based on their recent intercity passenger losses. The purchase price could be satisfied either by cash or rolling stock; in exchange, the railroads received NRPC common stock.
- Any participating railroad was freed of the obligation to operate intercity passenger service after May 1, 1971, except for those services chosen by the Department of Transportation (DOT) as part of a "basic system" of service and paid for by NRPC using its federal funds.
- Railroads that chose not to join the NRPC system were required to continue operating their existing passenger service until 1975, at which time they could pursue the customary Interstate Commerce Commission (ICC) approval process for any discontinuance or alteration to the service.

Of the 26 railroads still offering intercity passenger service in 1970, only six declined to join the NRPC.

Nearly everyone involved expected the experiment to be short-lived. The Nixon administration and many Washington insiders viewed the NRPC as a politically expedient way for the President and Congress to give passenger trains a "last hurrah" as demanded by the public. They expected the NRPC to quietly disappear as public interest waned. After Fortune magazine exposed the manufactured mismanagement in 1974, Louis W. Menk, chairman of the Burlington Northern Railroad, remarked that the story was undermining the scheme to dismantle Amtrak. Proponents also hoped that government intervention would be brief and that Amtrak would soon be able to support itself. Neither view had proved to be correct; popular support allowed Amtrak to continue in operation longer than critics imagined, while financial results made passenger train service returning to private railroad operations infeasible.

=== Selection of initial routes ===
"Headless Arrow" Amtrak Logo used from 1971 to 2000

The Rail Passenger Service Act gave the Secretary of Transportation, at that time John A. Volpe, thirty days to produce an initial draft of the endpoints of the routes the NRPC would be required by law to serve for four years. On November 24 Volpe presented his initial draft consisting of 27 routes to Nixon, which he believed would make a $24-million profit by 1975. The Office of Management and Budget believed Volpe and the DOT's analysis was far too optimistic, with director George Shultz arguing to cut the number of routes by around half. Nixon agreed with Shultz, and the public draft presented by Volpe on November 30 consisted of only 16 routes.

The initial reaction to this heavily-cut-back proposed system from the public, the press, and congressmen was strongly negative. It made front-page headlines across the country and it was quickly leaked that the DOT had wanted a far larger system than the White House would approve. The ICC produced its own report on December 29, criticising the proposed draft and arguing for the inclusion of 15 additional routes, giving further ammunition to the congressmen who wanted an expanded system. Further wrangling between the DOT and the White House produced the final list of routes on January 28, 1971, adding 5 additional routes to the November 30 draft.

These required routes had only their endpoints specified; the selection of the actual routes to be taken between the endpoints was left to the NRPC, which had just three months to decide them before it was due to start service. Consultants from McKinsey & Company were hired to perform this task, and their results were publicly announced on March 22.

At the same time, the NRPC had hired Lippincott & Margulies to create a brand for it and replace its original working brand name of Railpax. On March 30, L&M's work was presented to the NRPC's board of incorporators, who unanimously agreed on the "headless arrow" logo and on the new brand name "Amtrak", a portmanteau of the words America and trak, the latter itself a sensational spelling of track. The name change was publicly announced less than two weeks before operations began.

=== 1970s: The Rainbow Era ===
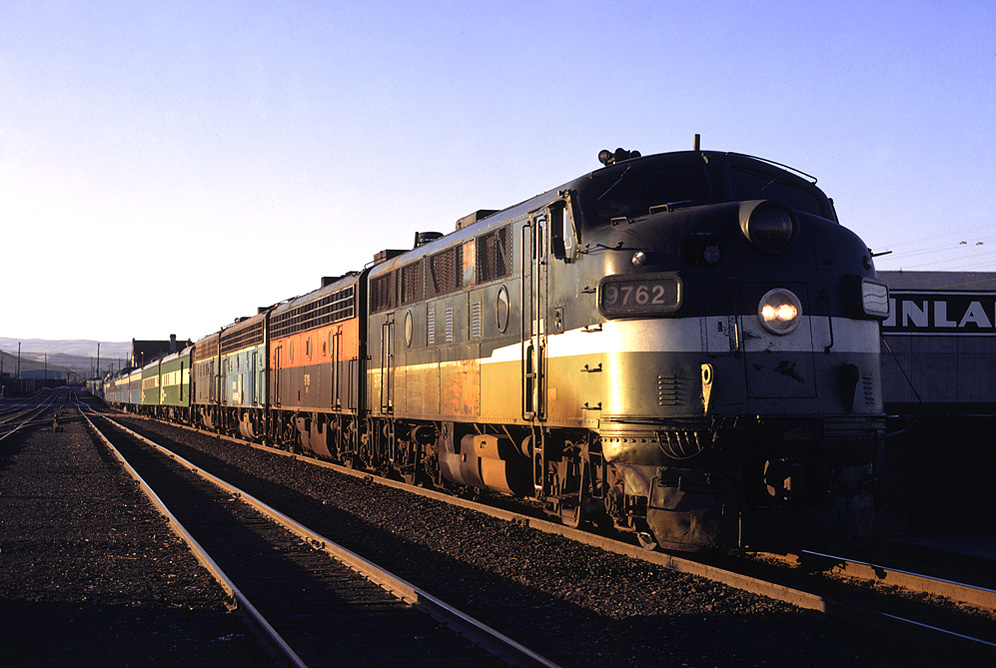
The North Coast Hiawatha near Yakima, Washington, in July 1971, an example of early Amtrak "rainbow" consists, made up of equipment still painted in the colors of various railroads

Amtrak began operations on May 1, 1971. Amtrak received no rail tracks or rights-of-way at its inception. All of Amtrak's routes were continuations of prior service, although Amtrak pruned about half the passenger rail network. Of the 366 train routes that operated previously, Amtrak continued only 184. Several major corridors became freight-only, including the ex-New York Central Railroad's Water Level Route from New York to Ohio and Grand Trunk Western Railroad's Chicago to Detroit route. The reduced passenger-train schedules created confusion amongst staff. At some stations, Amtrak service was available only late at night or early in the morning, prompting complaints from passengers. Disputes with freight railroads over track usage caused some services to be rerouted, temporarily cancelled, or replaced with buses. On the other hand, the creation of the Los Angeles–Seattle Coast Starlight from three formerly separate train routes was an immediate success, resulting in an increase to daily service by 1973.

Needing to operate only half the train routes that had operated previously, Amtrak would lease around 1,200 of the best passenger cars from the 3,000 that the private railroads owned. All were air-conditioned, and 90% were easy-to-maintain stainless steel. When Amtrak took over, passenger cars and locomotives initially retained the paint schemes and logos of their former owners which resulted in Amtrak's running trains with mismatched colors – the "Rainbow Era". In mid-1971, Amtrak began purchasing some of the equipment it had leased, including 286 EMD E and F unit diesel locomotives, 30 GG1 electric locomotives and 1,290 passenger cars. By 1975, the official Amtrak color scheme was painted on most Amtrak equipment and newly purchased locomotives and the rolling stock began appearing.

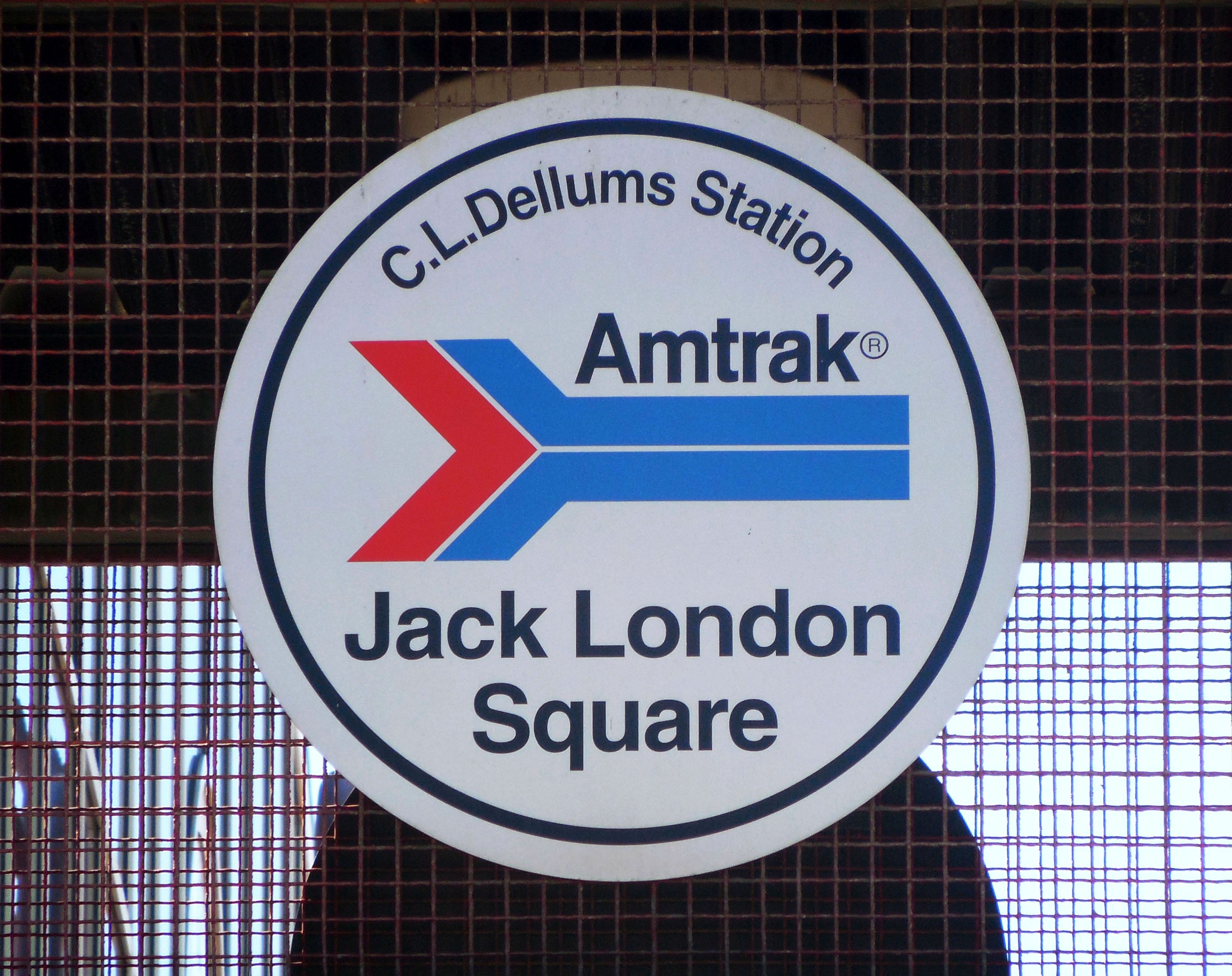
Classic Amtrak logo displayed at the Oakland – Jack London Square station, California

Amtrak inherited problems with train stations (most notably deferred maintenance) and redundant facilities from the competing railroads that once served the same communities. Chicago is a prime example; on the day prior to Amtrak's inception, intercity passenger trains used five different Chicago terminals: LaSalle, Dearborn, North Western Station, Central, and Union. The trains at LaSalle remained there, as their operator Rock Island could not afford to opt into Amtrak. Of all the trains serving Dearborn Station, Amtrak retained only a pair of Santa Fe trains, which relocated to Union Station beginning with the first Amtrak departures on May 1, 1971. Dearborn Station closed after the last pre-Amtrak trains on the Santa Fe arrived in Chicago on May 2. None of the intercity trains that had served North Western Station became part of the Amtrak system, and that terminal became commuter-only after May 1. The trains serving Central Station continued to use that station until an alternate routing was adopted in March 1972. In New York City, Amtrak had to maintain two stations (Penn and Grand Central) due to the lack of track connections to bring trains from upstate New York into Penn Station; a problem that was rectified once the Empire Connection was built in 1991. The Amtrak Standard Stations Program was launched in 1978 and proposed to build a standardized station design across the system with an aim to reduce costs, speed construction, and improve its corporate image. However, the cash-strapped railroad would ultimately build relatively few of these standard stations.

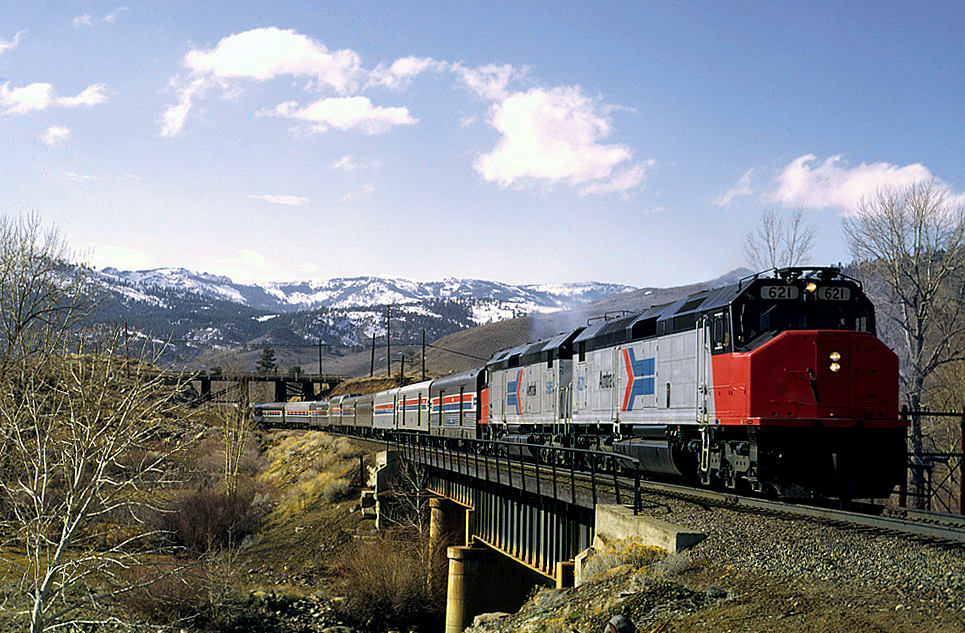
An Amtrak EMD SDP40F with the San Francisco Zephyr in 1975. By the mid-1970s, Amtrak equipment was acquiring its own identity.

Amtrak soon had the opportunity to acquire rights-of-way. Following the bankruptcy of several northeastern railroads in the early 1970s, including Penn Central, which owned and operated the Northeast Corridor (NEC), Congress passed the Railroad Revitalization and Regulatory Reform Act of 1976. A large part of the legislation was directed to the creation of Conrail, but the law also enabled the transfer of the portions of the NEC not already owned by state authorities to Amtrak. Amtrak acquired the majority of the NEC on April 1, 1976. (The portion in Massachusetts is owned by the Commonwealth and managed by Amtrak. The route from New Haven to New Rochelle is owned by New York's Metropolitan Transportation Authority and the Connecticut Department of Transportation as the New Haven Line.) This mainline became Amtrak's "jewel" asset, and helped the railroad generate revenue. While the NEC ridership and revenues were higher than those of any other segment of the system, the cost of operating and maintaining the corridor proved to be overwhelming. As a result, Amtrak's federal subsidy was increased dramatically. In subsequent years, other short-route segments not needed for freight operations were transferred to Amtrak.

In its first decade, Amtrak fell far short of financial independence, a shortage that continues today, but it did find modest success rebuilding trade. Outside factors discouraged competing transport, such as fuel shortages which increased costs of automobile and airline travel, and strikes which disrupted airline operations. Investments in Amtrak's track, equipment and information also made Amtrak more relevant to America's transportation needs. Amtrak's ridership increased from 16.6 million in 1972 to 21 million in 1981.

In February 1978, Amtrak moved its headquarters to 400 North Capitol Street NW, Washington, D.C.

=== 1980s and 1990s: The Building Era ===
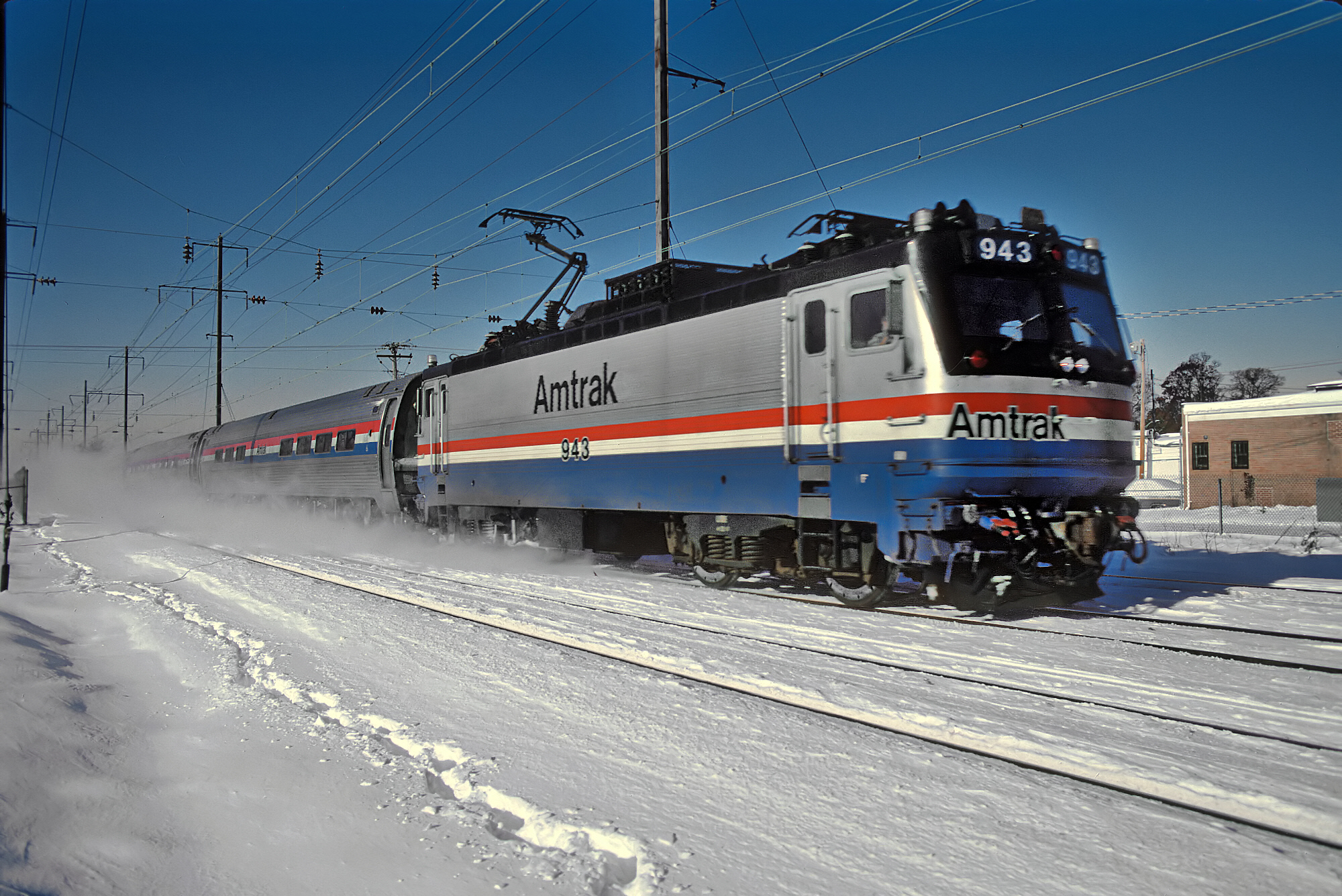
An EMD AEM-7 with a Metroliner in Seabrook, Maryland, in 1987. The AEM-7 was Amtrak's workhorse on electrified routes for over 30 years.

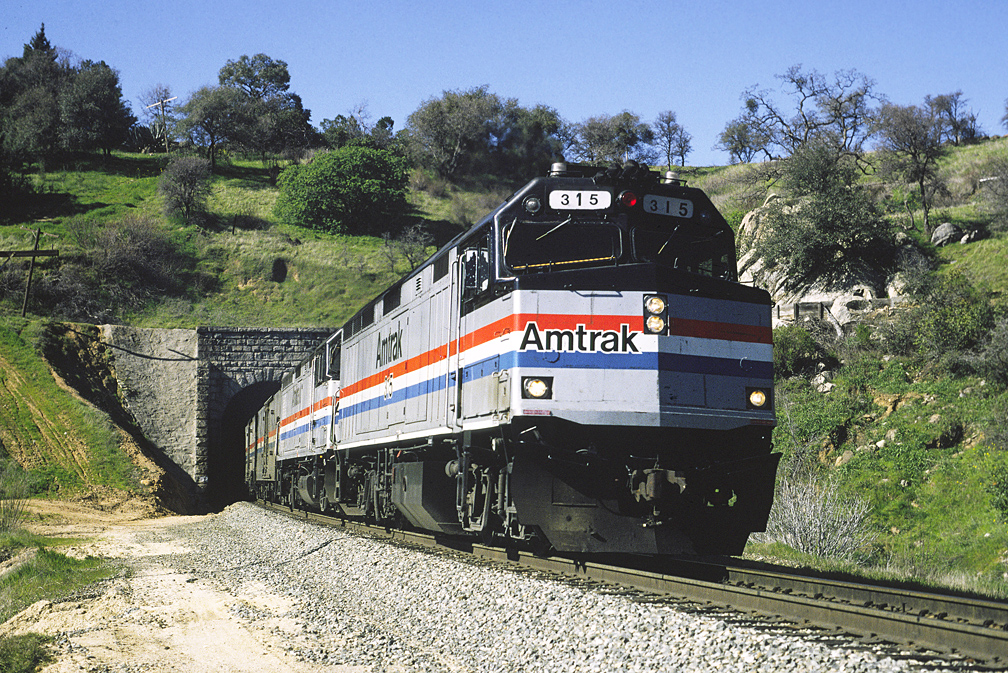
An EMD F40PH leads the California Zephyr in 1995. The F40PH replaced the unreliable SDP40F.

In 1982, former Secretary of the Navy and retired Southern Railway head William Graham Claytor Jr. came out of retirement to lead Amtrak. During his time at Southern, Claytor was a vocal critic of Amtrak's prior managers, who all came from non-railroading backgrounds. Transportation Secretary Drew Lewis cited this criticism as a reason that the Democrat Claytor was acceptable to the Reagan White House. Despite frequent clashes with the Reagan administration over funding, Claytor enjoyed a good relationship with Lewis, John H. Riley, the head of the Federal Railroad Administration (FRA), and with members of Congress. Limited funding led Claytor to use short-term debt to fund operations.

Building on mechanical developments in the 1970s, high-speed Washington–New York Metroliner Service was improved with new equipment and faster schedules. Travel time between New York and Washington, D.C., was reduced to under 3 hours due to system improvements and limited stop service. This improvement was cited as a reason that Amtrak grew its share of intercity trips between the cities along the corridor. Elsewhere in the country, demand for passenger rail service resulted in the creation of five new state-supported routes in California, Illinois, Missouri, Oregon and Pennsylvania, for a total of 15 state-supported routes.

Amtrak added two trains in 1983, the California Zephyr between Oakland and Chicago via Denver and revived the Auto Train, a unique service that carries both passengers and their vehicles. Amtrak advertised it as a great way to avoid traffic along the I-95 running between Lorton, Virginia, (near Washington, D.C.) and Sanford, Florida, (near Orlando) on the Silver Star alignment.

In 1980s and 1990s, stations in Baltimore, Chicago, and Washington, D.C., received major rehabilitation and the Empire Connection tunnel opened in 1991, allowing Amtrak to consolidate all New York services at Penn Station. Despite the improvements, Amtrak's ridership stagnated at roughly 20 million passengers per year, amid uncertain government aid from 1981 to about 2000.

In the early 1990s, Amtrak tested several different high-speed trains from Europe on the Northeast Corridor. An X 2000 train was leased from Sweden for test runs from October 1992 to January 1993, followed by revenue service between Washington, D.C., and New York City from February to May and August to September 1993. Siemens showed the ICE 1 train from Germany, organizing the ICE Train North America Tour which started to operate on the Northeast Corridor on July 3, 1993.

In 1993, Thomas Downs succeeded Claytor as Amtrak's fifth president. The stated goal remained "operational self-sufficiency". By this time, however, Amtrak had a large overhang of debt from years of underfunding. In the mid-1990s, Amtrak suffered through a serious cash crunch. Under Downs, Congress included a provision in the Taxpayer Relief Act of 1997 that resulted in Amtrak's receiving a $2.3 billion tax refund that resolved their cash crisis. However, Congress also instituted a "glide path" to financial self-sufficiency, excluding railroad retirement tax act payments.

George Warrington became the sixth president in 1998, with a mandate to make Amtrak financially self-sufficient. Under Warrington, the company tried to expand into express freight shipping, placing Amtrak in competition with the "host" freight railroads and the trucking industry.

On March 9, 1999, Amtrak unveiled its plan for the Acela Express, a high-speed train on the Northeast Corridor between Washington, D.C., and Boston. Several changes were made to the corridor to make it suitable for higher-speed electric trains. The Northend Electrification Project extended existing electrification from New Haven, Connecticut, to Boston to complete the overhead power supply along the 454-mile (731 km) route, and several grade crossings were improved or removed.

=== 2000s: Growth in the 21st century ===
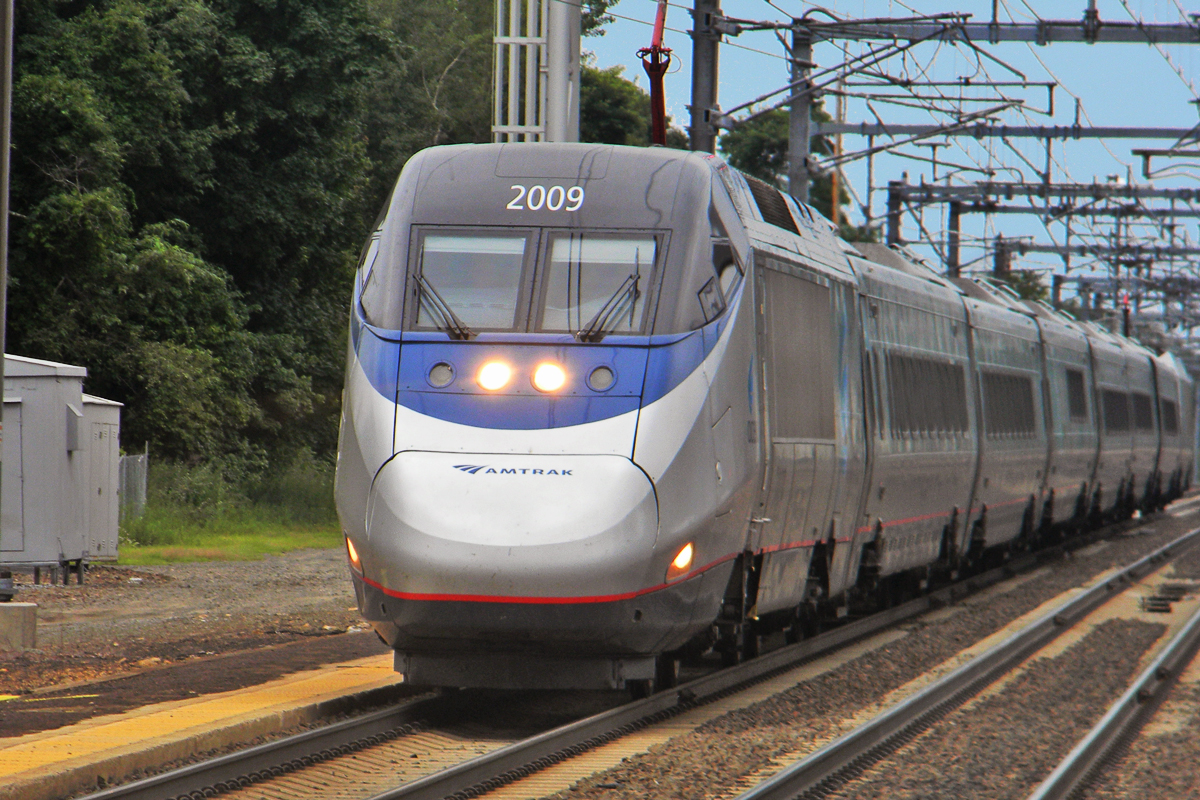
The first-generation Acela at Old Saybrook, Connecticut, in 2011

Ridership increased during the first decade of the 21st century after the implementation of capital improvements in the NEC and rises in automobile fuel costs. The inauguration of the high-speed Acela in late 2000 generated considerable publicity and led to major ridership gains. However, through the late 1990s and very early 21st century, Amtrak could not add sufficient express freight revenue or cut sufficient other expenditures to break even. By 2002, it was clear that Amtrak could not achieve self-sufficiency, but Congress continued to authorize funding and released Amtrak from the requirement.

In early 2002, David L. Gunn replaced Warrington as seventh president. In a departure from his predecessors' promises to make Amtrak self-sufficient in the short term, Gunn argued that no form of passenger transportation in the United States is self-sufficient as the economy is currently structured. Highways, airports, and air traffic control all require large government expenditures to build and operate, coming from the Highway Trust Fund and Aviation Trust Fund paid for by user fees, highway fuel and road taxes, and, in the case of the General Fund, from general taxation. Gunn dropped most freight express business and worked to eliminate deferred maintenance.

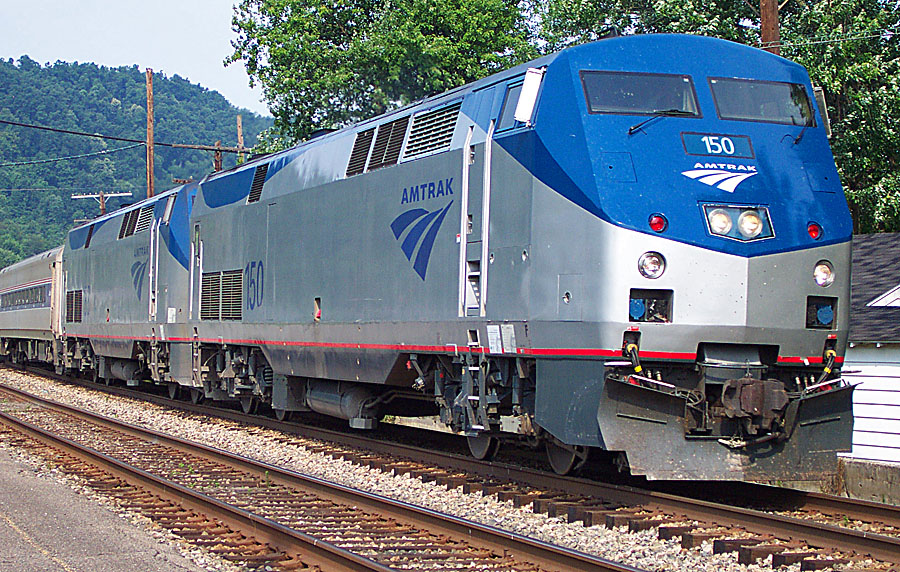
GE Genesis diesel locomotives lead the Cardinal in 2006. In the 21st century, Amtrak replaced the F40PH with the Genesis series.

A plan by the Bush administration "to privatize parts of the national passenger rail system and spin off other parts to partial state ownership" provoked disagreement within Amtrak's board of directors. Late in 2005, Gunn was fired. Gunn's replacement, Alexander Kummant (2006–08), was committed to operating a national rail network, and like Gunn, opposed the notion of putting the Northeast Corridor under separate ownership. He said that shedding the system's long-distance routes would amount to selling national assets that are on par with national parks, and that Amtrak's abandonment of these routes would be irreversible. In late 2006, Amtrak unsuccessfully sought annual congressional funding of $1 billion for ten years. In early 2007, Amtrak employed 20,000 people in 46 states and served 25 million passengers a year, its highest number since its founding in 1970. Politico noted a key problem: "the rail system chronically operates in the red. A pattern has emerged: Congress overrides cutbacks demanded by the White House and appropriates enough funds to keep Amtrak from plunging into insolvency. But, Amtrak advocates say, that is not enough to fix the system's woes."

Joseph H. Boardman replaced Kummant as president and CEO in late 2008.

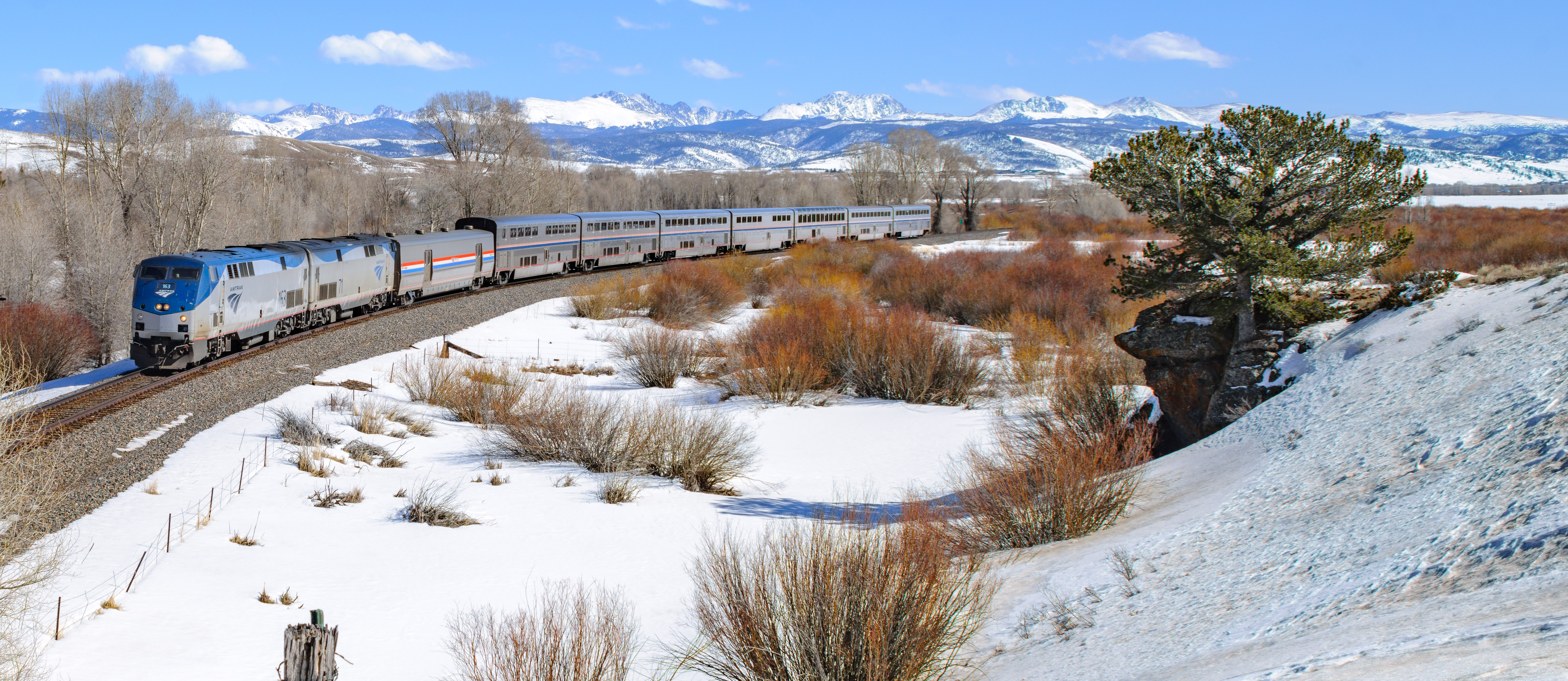
Two GE Genesis diesels lead the California Zephyr in front of the Rocky Mountains.

From May 2011 to May 2012, Amtrak celebrated its 40th anniversary with festivities across the country that started on National Train Day (May 7, 2011). A commemorative book entitled Amtrak: An American Story was published, a documentary was created, six locomotives were painted in Amtrak's four prior paint schemes, and an Exhibit Train toured the country visiting 45 communities and welcoming more than 85,000 visitors.

After years of almost revolving-door CEOs at Amtrak, in December 2013, Boardman was named "Railroader of the Year" by Railway Age magazine, which noted that with over five years in the job, he is the second-longest serving head of Amtrak since it was formed more than 40 years ago. On December 9, 2015, Boardman announced in a letter to employees that he would be leaving Amtrak in September 2016. He had advised the Amtrak Board of Directors of his decision the previous week. On August 19, 2016, the Amtrak Board of Directors named former Norfolk Southern Railway President & CEO Charles "Wick" Moorman as Boardman's successor with an effective date of September 1, 2016. During his term, Moorman took no salary and said that he saw his role as one of a "transitional CEO" who would reorganize Amtrak before turning it over to new leadership.

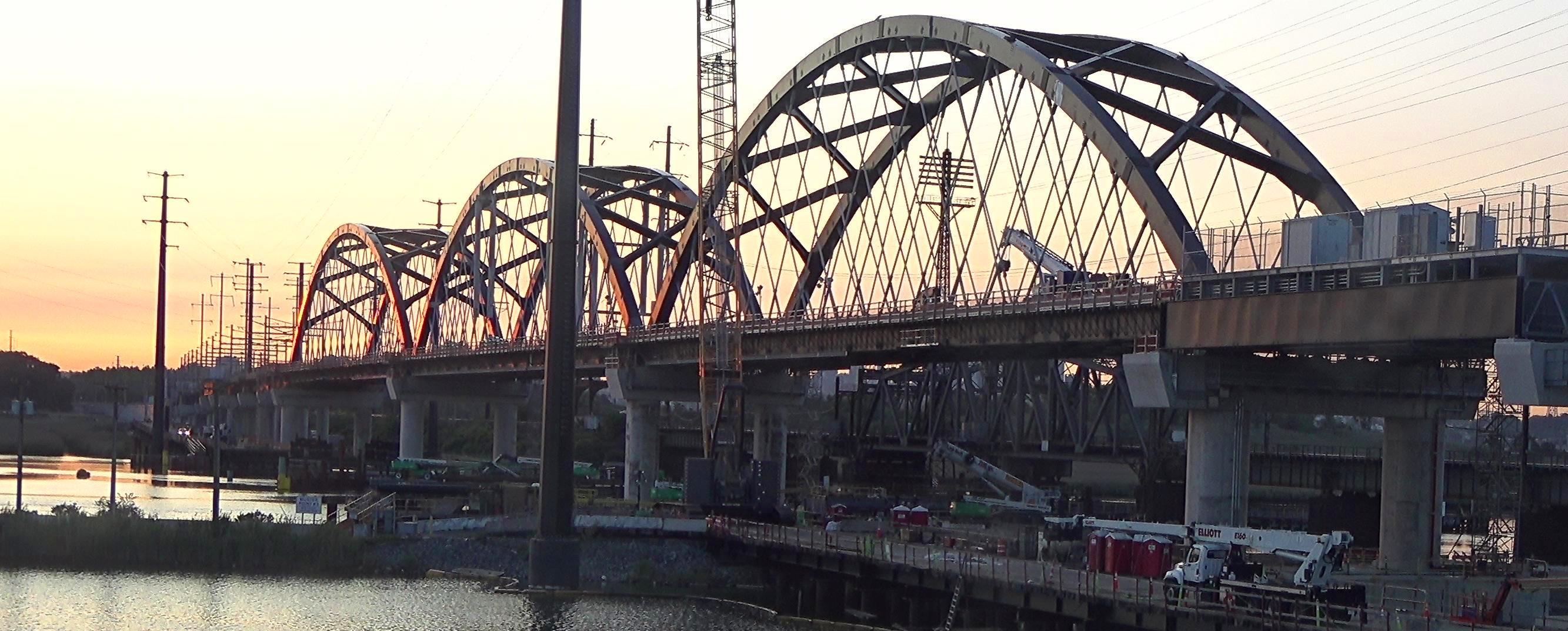
The Portal North Bridge was completed in 2026.

Back in 2011, Amtrak announced its intention to improve and expand the high-speed rail corridor from Penn Station in NYC, under the Hudson River in new tunnels, and double-tracking the line to Newark, NJ, initially estimated to cost $13.5 billion (equal to $19 billion in 2025). On November 17, 2016, the Gateway Program Development Corporation (GDC) was formed for the purpose of overseeing and effectuating the rail infrastructure improvements known as the Gateway Program. The program includes the Hudson Tunnel Project, to build a new tunnel under the Hudson River and rehabilitate the existing century-old tunnel, and the Portal North Bridge, to replace a century-old moveable bridge with a modern structure that is less prone to failure. Later projects will include the expansion of track and platforms at Penn Station New York, construction of the Bergen Loop and other improvements will roughly double capacity for Amtrak and NJ Transit trains in the busiest, most complex section of the Northeast Corridor.

In June 2017, former Delta and Northwest Airlines CEO Richard Anderson was announced as Amtrak's next President & CEO. Anderson began the job on July 12, assuming the title of President immediately and serving alongside Moorman as "co-CEOs" until the end of the year.

Three years later, on April 15, 2020, Atlas Air Chairman, President and CEO William Flynn was named Amtrak President and CEO. In addition to Atlas Air, Flynn held senior roles at CSX Transportation, SeaLand Services and GeoLogistics Corp. Anderson would remain with Amtrak as a senior advisor until December 2020.

As Amtrak approached profitability in 2020, the company undertook planning to expand and create new intermediate-distance corridors across the country. Included were several new services in Ohio, Tennessee, Colorado, and Minnesota, among other states.

During the COVID-19 pandemic, Amtrak continued operating as an essential service. It started requiring face coverings the week of May 17, and limited sales to 50% of capacity. Most long-distance routes were reduced to three weekly round trips in October 2020.

In March 2021, following President Joe Biden's American Jobs Plan announcement, Amtrak CEO Bill Flynn outlined a proposal called Amtrak Connects US that would expand state-supported intercity corridors with an infusion of upfront capital assistance. This would expand service to cities including Las Vegas, Phoenix, Baton Rouge, Nashville, Chattanooga, Louisville, Columbus (Ohio), Wilmington (North Carolina), Cheyenne, Montgomery, Concord, and Scranton. Also in March 2021, Amtrak announced plans to return 12 of its long-distance routes to daily schedules later in the spring. Most of these routes were restored to daily service in late-May 2021. However, a resurgence of the virus caused by the Omicron variant caused Amtrak to modify and/or suspend many of these routes again from January to March 2022.

Stephen Gardner, a former Amtrak intern and longtime executive, became the company's CEO in January 2022. He resigned abruptly on March 19, 2025, amid reports that the Trump administration had pressured him to step down. Earlier that month, Trump advisor Elon Musk had expressed an intention to privatize Amtrak.

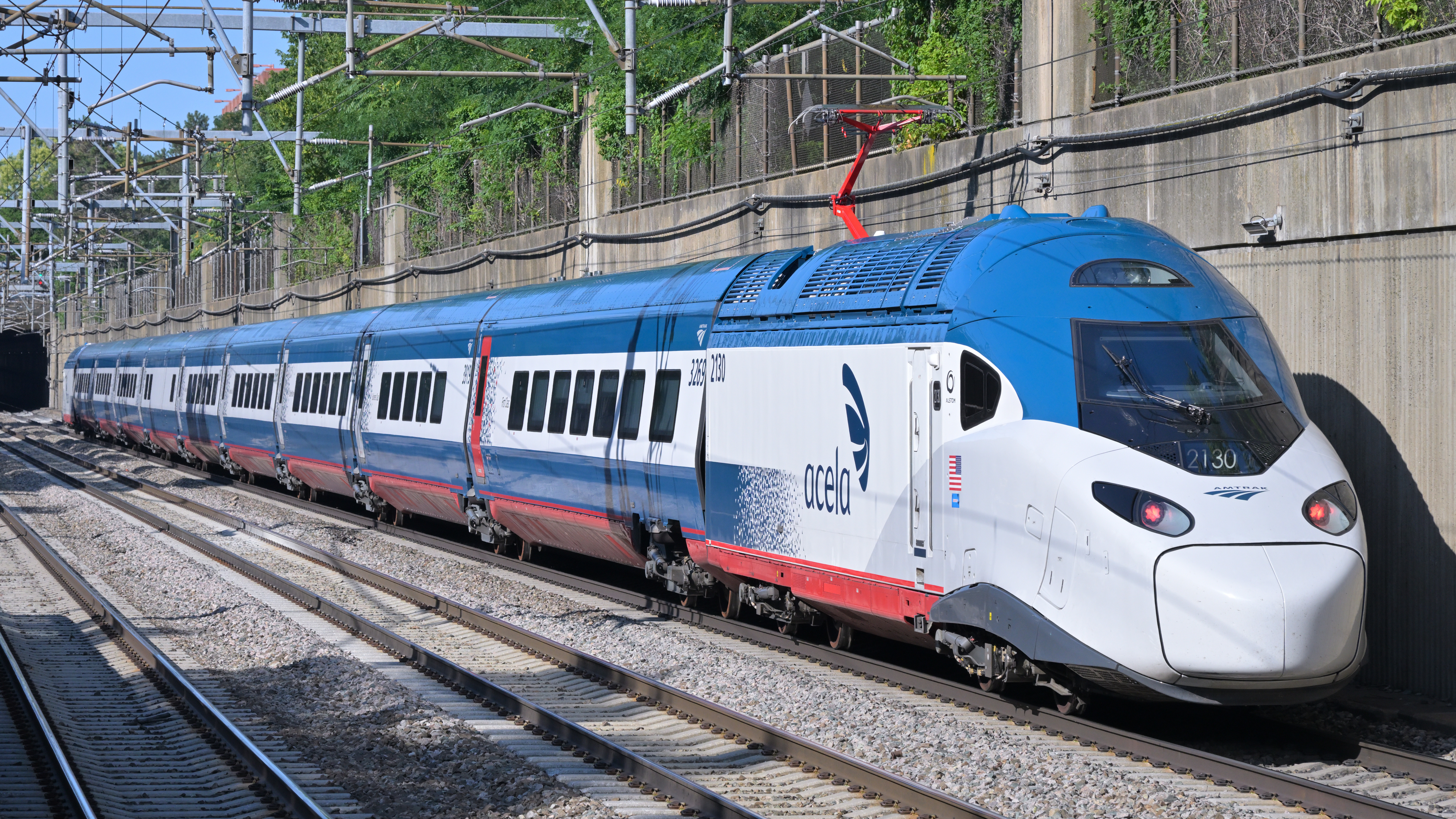
A NextGen Acela in 2025.

In 2025, the original Acela Express equipment began to be replaced by new Avelia Liberty trainsets, which Amtrak markets as the NextGen Acela. The new trains have greater passenger capacity and an enhanced active tilt system that allows higher speeds on the many curved sections of the route. The first five trainsets entered passenger service on August 28, 2025, and as of August 2026, 16 of the total order of 28 trainsets have entered service.

In August 2026, Amtrak announced tentative plans to change its corporate structure. If the changes take place, Amtrak would remain the parent company but three strands of business focus would be introduced: passenger services, infrastructure management, and fleet management. A formal proposal for the restructuring will be presented to the Amtrak board in 2027.

An Amtrak Airo trainset in Salem, Oregon.

In September 2026, the first Amtrak Airo trainset entered service on the Amtrak Cascades. Built by Siemens Mobility for Amtrak, the 83 new trainsets will replace older equipment used on the Northeast Corridor and state-supported routes throughout the United States.

== Operations ==
=== Routes ===
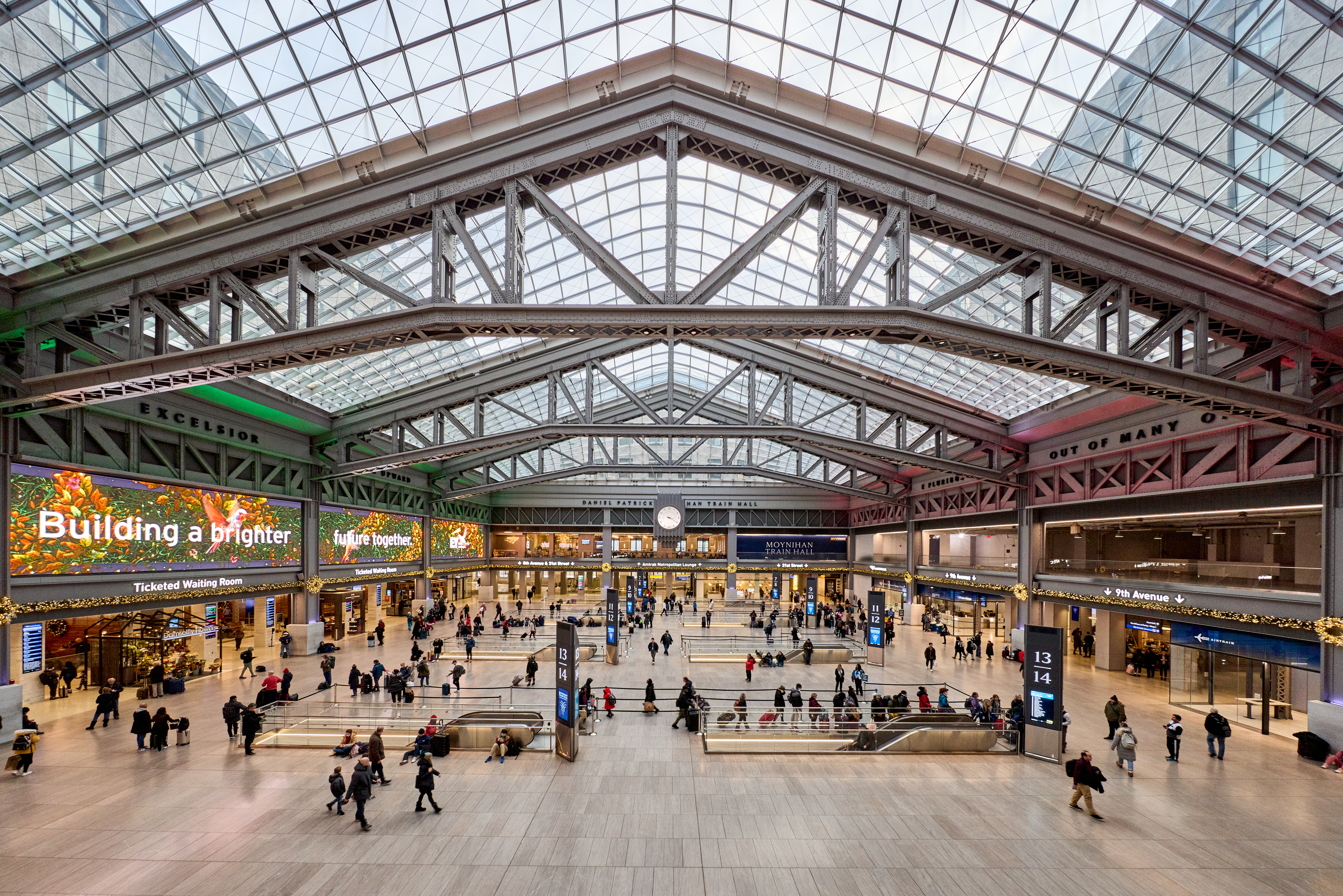
New York City's Moynihan Train Hall at Penn Station, Amtrak's busiest station by boardings

Amtrak is required by law to operate a national route system. Amtrak has presence in 46 of the 48 contiguous states, as well as the District of Columbia (with only thruway connecting services in Wyoming and no services in South Dakota). Amtrak services fall into three groups: inter-city services on the Northeast Corridor, state-supported inter-city services outside the Northeast Corridor, and medium- and long-distance services (known within Amtrak as the National Network). Amtrak receives federal funding for the vast majority of its operations including the central spine of the Northeast Corridor as well as for its National Network routes. In addition to the federally funded routes, Amtrak partners with transportation agencies in 20 states to operate other inter-city and medium-distance routes outside of the Northeast Corridor, some of which connect to it or extend beyond it. In addition to its inter-city services, Amtrak also operates commuter services under contract for two public agencies: the MARC Penn Line in Maryland and Shore Line East in Connecticut.

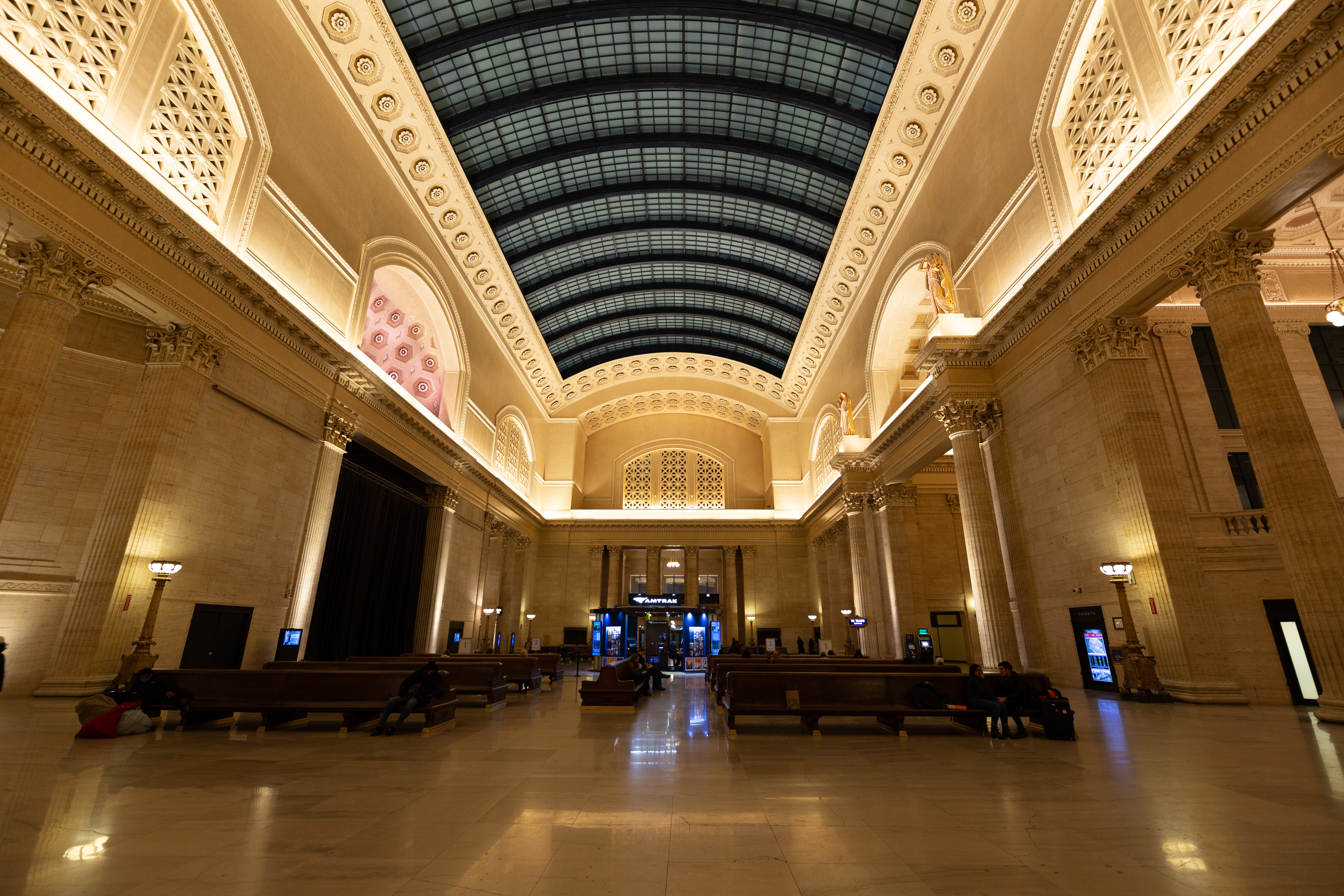
Chicago Union Station, Amtrak's busiest station not on the Northeast Corridor and main hub for long-distance services

Service on the Northeast Corridor (NEC), between Boston and Washington, D.C., as well as between Philadelphia and Harrisburg, is powered by overhead lines; for the rest of the system, diesel-electric locomotives are used. Routes vary widely in the frequency of service, from three-days-a-week trains on the Sunset Limited and the Cardinal, to several times per hour on the Northeast Corridor. For areas not served by trains, Amtrak Thruway routes provide guaranteed connections to trains via buses, vans, ferries and other modes.

The most popular and heavily used services are those running on the Northeast Corridor (NEC), including the Acela and Northeast Regional. The NEC runs between Boston and Washington, D.C. via New York City and Philadelphia. Some services continue into Virginia. The NEC services accounted for 4.4 million of Amtrak's 12.2 million passengers in fiscal year 2021. Outside the NEC the most popular services are located in California, including the Pacific Surfliner, Capitol Corridor, and Gold Runner, which are supplemented by an extensive network of connecting buses. Together, the California corridor trains accounted for a combined 2.35 million passengers in fiscal year 2021. Other popular routes include the Empire Service between New York City and Niagara Falls, via Albany and Buffalo, which carried 613.2 thousand passengers in fiscal year 2021, and the Keystone Service between New York City and Harrisburg via Philadelphia that carried 394.3 thousand passengers that same year.

Four of the six busiest stations by boardings are on the NEC: New York Penn Station (first), Washington Union Station (second), Philadelphia 30th Street Station (third), and Boston South Station (fifth). The other two are Chicago Union Station (fourth) and Los Angeles Union Station (sixth).

=== On-time performance ===
On-time performance is calculated differently for airlines than for Amtrak. A plane is considered on-time if it arrives within 15 minutes of the schedule. Amtrak uses a sliding scale, with trips under 250 miles (400 km) considered late if they are more than 10 minutes behind schedule, up to 30 minutes for trips over 551 miles (887 km) in length.

Outside the Northeast Corridor and stretches of track in Southern California and Michigan, most Amtrak trains run on tracks owned and operated by privately owned freight railroads. BNSF is the largest host to Amtrak routes, with 6.3 million train-miles. Freight rail operators are required under federal law to give dispatching preference to Amtrak trains. Amtrak has accused freight railroads of violating or skirting these regulations, resulting in passenger trains having to wait for freight traffic to clear the track.

The railroads' dispatching practices were investigated in 2008, resulting in stricter laws about train priority. Subsequently, Amtrak's overall on-time performance went up from 74.7% in fiscal 2008 to 84.7% in 2009, with long-distance trains and others outside the NEC seeing the greatest benefit. The Missouri River Runner jumped from 11% to 95%, becoming one of Amtrak's best performers. The Texas Eagle went from 22.4% to 96.7%, and the California Zephyr, with a 5% on-time record in 2008, went up to 78.3%. This improved performance coincided with a general economic downturn, resulting in the lowest freight-rail traffic volumes since at least 1988, meaning less freight traffic to impede passenger traffic.

In 2018, Amtrak began issuing "report cards" to host railroads, grading each based on the railroad's impact to on-time performance. The first report card, issued in March 2018, includes one A (given to Canadian Pacific) and two Fs (given to Canadian National and Norfolk Southern). Amtrak's 2020 host report card gives Canadian Pacific and Canadian National an A, BNSF and CSX a B, Union Pacific a C+, and Norfolk Southern a D−. Amtrak's 2023 host report card gives Canadian Pacific Kansas City an A, CSX and Canadian National a B+, BNSF a B, Norfolk Southern a B−, and Union Pacific a C−.

Amtrak's median on-time performance between 2018 and 2023 was 74.5%, reaching a high of 80% in 2020. It was highest on the Northeast Corridor (81.3%). The vast majority of hours of delay, about 57.5% on average, were caused by the host railroad. Long-distance routes performed similarly to the total weighted on-time percentage.

=== Ridership ===
All ridership numbers are for Amtrak's fiscal year, which runs from October 1st of the previous year to September 30th of the current year.

Annual ridership by fiscal year 1971–2023

Amtrak carried 15.8 million passengers in 1972, its first full year of operation. Ridership has increased steadily ever since, carrying a record 32 million passengers in fiscal year (FY) 2019, more than double the total in 1972. For the fiscal year ending on September 30, 2020, Amtrak reported 16.8 million passengers, with the decline resulting from effects of the COVID-19 pandemic. FY 2021 saw ridership decrease more, with 12.2 million passengers reported. FY 2022 saw an increase to 22.9 million passengers, further increasing to 28.6 million passengers in FY 2023. In FY 2024, Amtrak's ridership increased to 32.8 million passengers, surpassing the record set in FY 2019. FY 2025 saw ridership continue to increase to 34.5 million passengers, setting an all-time record for the second year in a row.

=== Guest Rewards ===
Amtrak's loyalty program, Guest Rewards, is similar to the frequent-flyer programs of many airlines. Guest Rewards members accumulate points by riding Amtrak and through other activities, and can redeem these points for free Amtrak tickets and other rewards.

=== Rail passes ===
Amtrak offers the USA Rail Pass, valid for 10 segments (rides) in 30 days; and the California rail pass which is valid for 7 days of travel in a period of 21 days.

=== Lines ===
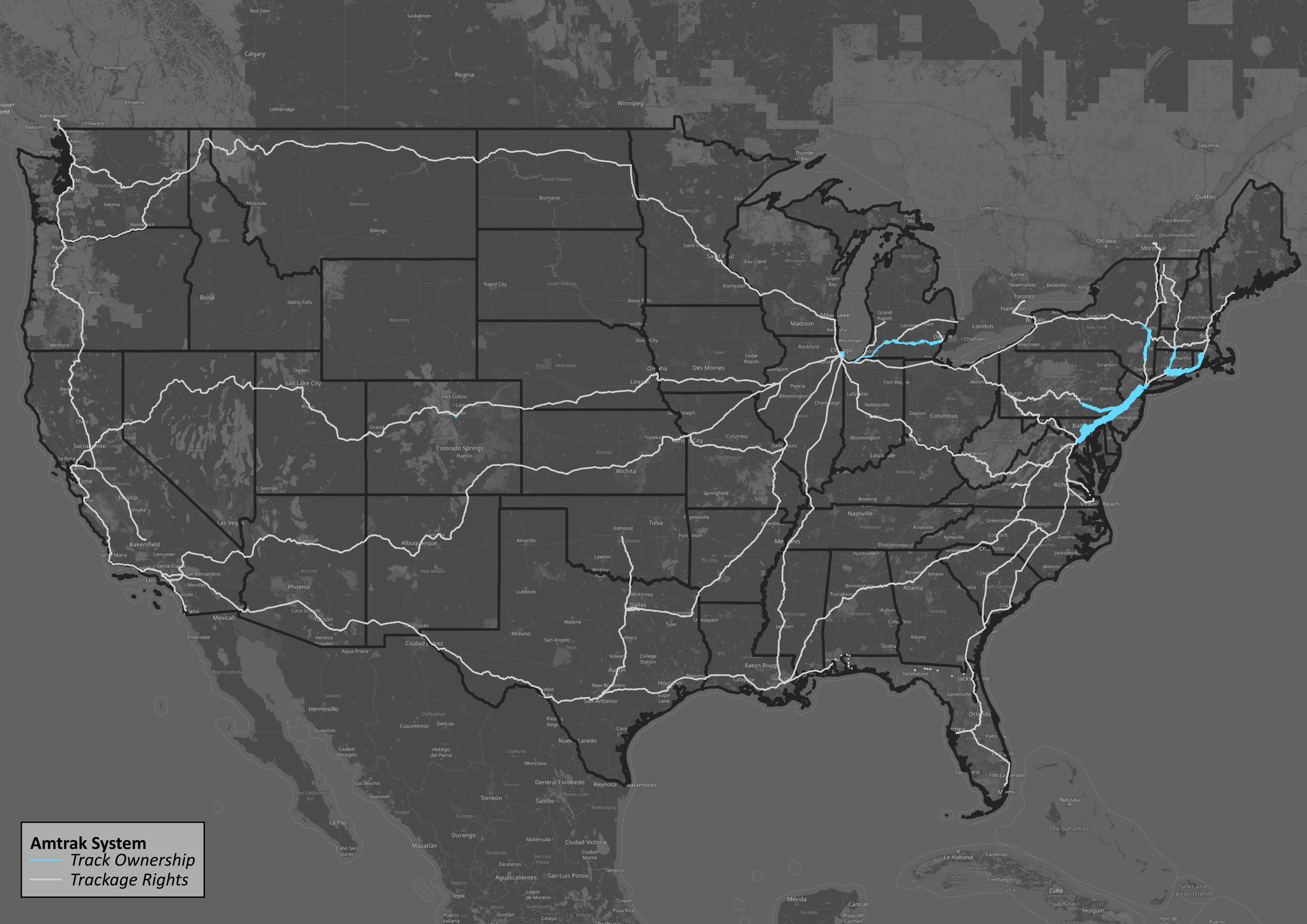
Amtrak system map with mainline routes owned by the Amtrak shown in light blue

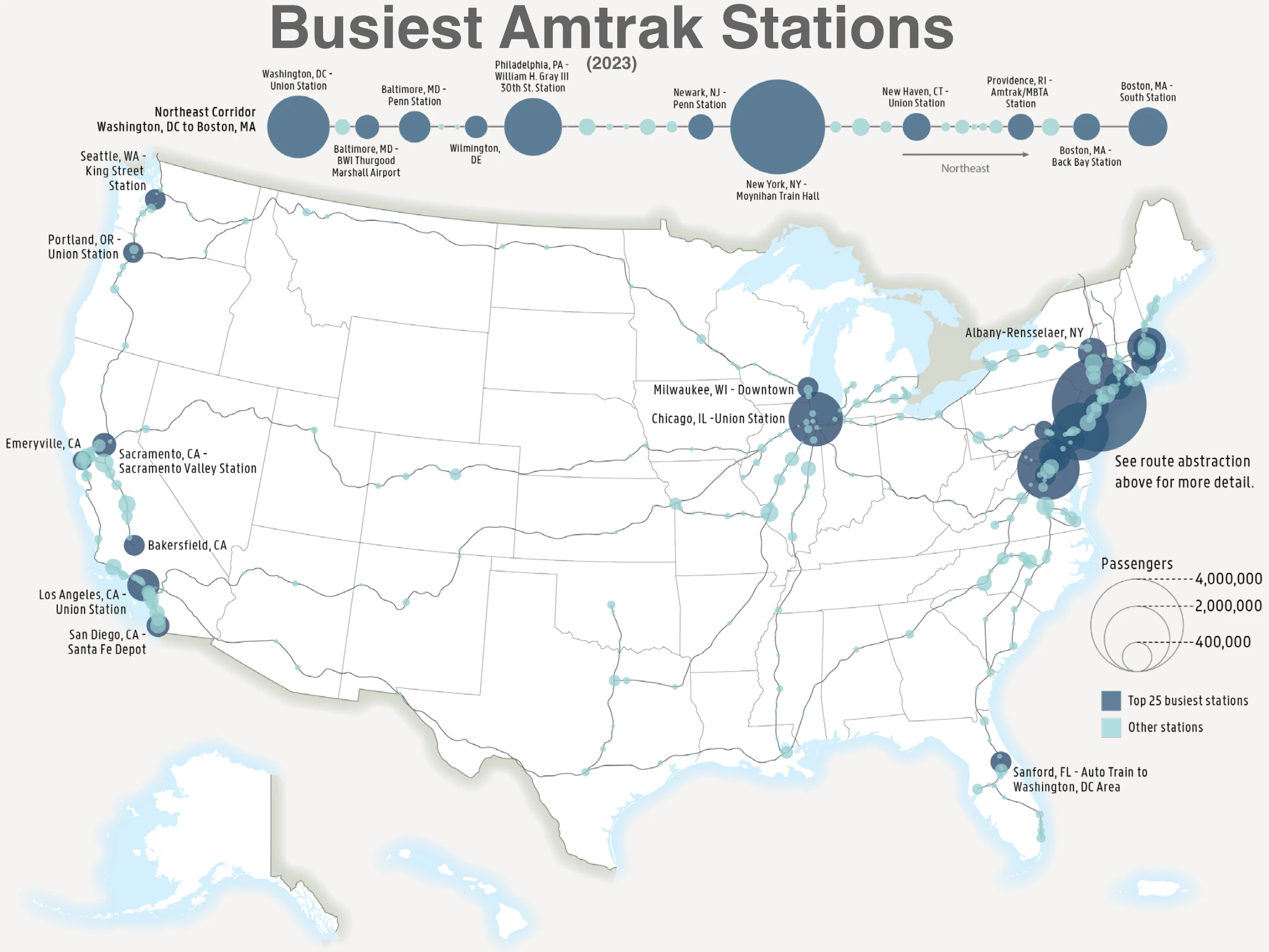
Busiest Amtrak Stations

Along the NEC and other lines, Amtrak owns 2,045 miles (3,291 km) of track, including 17 tunnels and 1,310 undergrade bridges.In several places, primarily in New England, Amtrak leases tracks, providing track maintenance and controlling train movements. Most often, these tracks are leased from state, regional, or local governments. The lines are further divided into services. Amtrak owns and operates the following lines:

- Northeast Corridor: the Northeast Corridor between Washington, D.C., and Boston via Baltimore, Philadelphia, Newark, New York and Providence is largely owned by Amtrak (363 of 457 miles), working cooperatively with several state and regional commuter agencies. Between New Haven, Connecticut, and New Rochelle, New York, Northeast Corridor trains travel on the Metro-North Railroad's New Haven Line, which is owned and operated by the Connecticut Department of Transportation and the Metropolitan Transportation Authority.
- Keystone Corridor: Amtrak owns the 104.2-mile line from Philadelphia to Harrisburg, Pennsylvania. As a result of an investment partnership with the Commonwealth of Pennsylvania, signal and track improvements that were completed in October 2006 allow all-electric service with a top speed of 110 miles per hour (180 km/h) to run along the corridor.
- Empire Corridor: Amtrak owns the 11 miles (18 km) between New York Penn Station and Spuyten Duyvil, New York. In 2012, Amtrak leased the 94 miles (151 km) between Poughkeepsie, New York, and Schenectady, New York, from owner CSX. In addition, Amtrak owns the tracks across the Whirlpool Rapids Bridge and short approach sections near it.
- Michigan Line: Amtrak acquired the 98 miles (158 km) of Porter, Indiana, to Kalamazoo, Michigan, section of the former Michigan Central main line from Conrail in 1976.
- New Haven–Springfield Line: Amtrak purchased the 62 miles (100 km) between New Haven and Springfield from Penn Central in 1976.
- Post Road Branch: 12.42 miles (19.99 km), Castleton-on-Hudson to Rensselaer, New York

In addition to these lines, Amtrak owns station and yard tracks in Chicago, Los Angeles, New Orleans, New York City, Oakland, Orlando, Portland, Oregon, Seattle, Philadelphia, and Washington, D.C. Amtrak leases station and yard tracks in Hialeah, near Miami, Florida, from the State of Florida.

Amtrak owns New York Penn Station, Chicago Union Station, Philadelphia 30th Street Station, Baltimore Penn Station and Providence Station. Through the Washington Terminal Company, in which it owns a 99.7 percent interest, it owns the rail infrastructure around Washington Union Station. It also holds a 99% interest in 30th Street Limited, a partnership responsible for redeveloping the area in and around Philadelphia's 30th Street Station. Amtrak also owns Passenger Railroad Insurance.

=== Service lines ===
Amtrak organizes its business into six "service lines", which are treated like divisions at most companies. Three service lines relate directly to rail operations: Northeast Corridor, which operates Amtrak's high-speed Acela and Northeast Regional trains; State Supported, which provides service on corridor routes of less than 750 miles (1,207 km) through cost-sharing agreements with state governments; and Long Distance, which operates routes over 750 miles (1,207 km) and receives financial support from the federal government.

Three additional service lines manage Amtrak's additional revenue services, net profit from which is used to fund rail operations: Real Estate & Commercial manages property owned by Amtrak, Infrastructure Access/Reimbursable charges other railroads for access to Amtrak owned tracks and performs maintenance work that can be reimbursed by other railroads or state governments, and Ancillary provides other services including operating commuter trains under contract, establishing Amtrak Thruway connecting services, operating charter trains, and hauling private railcars.

=== Accessibility ===
As of July 2023, 117 of 385 stations were in compliance with the Americans with Disabilities Act.

== Rolling stock ==
Amtrak operates a fleet of 1,957 railway cars and 332 locomotives for revenue service and railroad operations, collectively referred to as its rolling stock. Notable examples include the GE Genesis and Siemens Charger diesel locomotives, the Siemens ACS-64 electric locomotive, the Amfleet and Viewliner series of single-level passenger cars, the Superliner series of double-decker passenger cars, and Acela Express and Avelia Liberty high-speed trainsets. In addition, Amtrak operates 196 locomotives and railcars that are wholly owned by its state partners.

The railroad is currently undertaking a fleet replacement effort, buying 28 NextGen Acela (Avelia Liberty) trainsets for its flagship Acela service and 83 Amtrak Airo trainsets for other Northeast Corridor services. Separately, California and a consortium of Midwestern states have purchased Siemens Venture trainsets for use on Amtrak-operated routes within their regions; these began entering service in 2022. In 2023, Amtrak issued a request for proposals to replace hundreds of bilevel railcars used on long-distance routes, and a similar RFP for single-level long-distance railcars was issued in 2025. Both RFPs were cancelled in early 2026 in favor of a standardized single-level long-distance fleet.

== On-board services ==
=== Classes of service ===
The interior of a Viewliner II sleeping car bedroom with the lower bed down, 2023

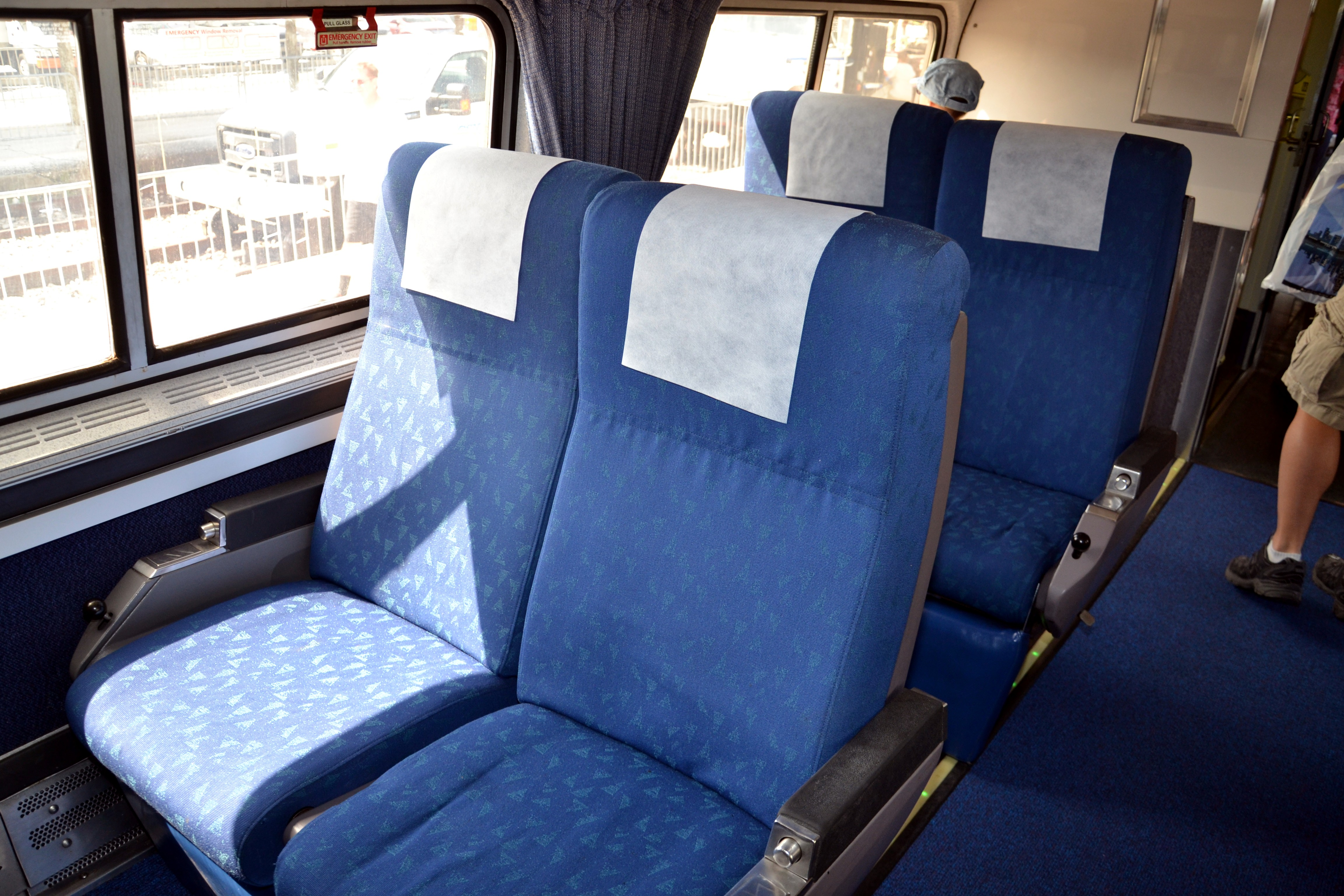
The interior of a long-distance Amfleet II coach, prior to the completion of recent refurbishments

Amtrak offers four classes of service: First Class, First Class Private Rooms, Business Class, and Coach Class:

- First Class: First Class service is offered on only the Acela. Seats are larger than those of Business Class and come in a variety of seating styles (single, facing singles with table, double, facing doubles with table and wheelchair accessible). First Class is located in a separate car from business class and is located at the end of the train (to reduce the number of passengers walking in the aisles). A car attendant provides passengers with hot towel service, a complimentary meal and alcoholic beverages. First Class passengers have access to lounges located at most larger stations.
- First Class Private Rooms: Offered on long-distance trains, accommodations include roomettes, bedrooms, bedroom suites, accessible bedrooms, and, on some trains, family bedrooms. Included in the price of a room are attendant service and on most routes, full hot meals. At night, attendants convert rooms into sleeping areas with fold-down beds and linens. Shower facilities with towels and bar soap are available. Complimentary juice, coffee and bottled water are included as well. Sleeper car passengers have access to all passenger facilities aboard the train and lounges located at select stations.
- Business Class: Business Class seating is offered on the Acela, Northeast Regional, many short-haul corridor trains and some long-distance trains. It is the standard class of service on the Acela. On all other trains where it is offered, Business Class is located in a dedicated car or section of the train. While the specific features vary by route, many include extra legroom and complimentary non-alcoholic drinks. Seats in business class recline and feature a fold-down tray table, footrest, individual reading light, and power outlet. Passengers have access to some lounges, but busier locations may exclude Business Class customers.
- Coach Class: Coach Class is the standard class of service on all Amtrak trains except the Acela. Seats in coach recline and feature a fold-down tray table, footrest, individual reading light, and power outlet. Coach cars on long-distance trains are configured with fewer seats per car so that passengers have additional legroom and seats which are equipped with leg rests. Some corridor and short-distance trains have one coach car designated as a "quiet car" where loud conversations, phone calls, and sound played from electronic devices are not permitted.

=== Wi-Fi and electronic services ===
Amtrak first offered free Wi-Fi service to passengers aboard the Downeaster in 2008, the Acela and the Northeast Regional trains on the NEC in 2010, and the Amtrak Cascades in 2011. In February 2014, Amtrak rolled out Wi-Fi on corridor trains out of Chicago. When all the Midwest cars offer the AmtrakConnect service, about 85% of all Amtrak passengers nationwide will have Wi-Fi access. As of 2014, most Amtrak passengers have access to free Wi-Fi. The service has developed a reputation for being unreliable and slow due to its cellular network connection; on some routes it is usually unusable, either freezing on the login page or, if it manages to log in, failing to provide any internet bandwidth.

Wi-Fi service is considered to be more reliable on routes running east of the Mississippi River and along the coastlines; service is less reliable on east–west routes such as Sunset Limited, Southwest Chief and Texas Eagle, as these contain rail segments passing through large sections of wilderness with sparse cell coverage.

Amtrak launched an e-ticketing system on the Downeaster in November 2011 and rolled it out nationwide on July 30, 2012. Amtrak officials said the system gives "more accurate knowledge in realtime of who is on the train which greatly improves the safety and security of passengers; en route reporting of onboard equipment problems to mechanical crews which may result in faster resolution of the issue; and more efficient financial reporting".

=== Baggage and cargo services ===
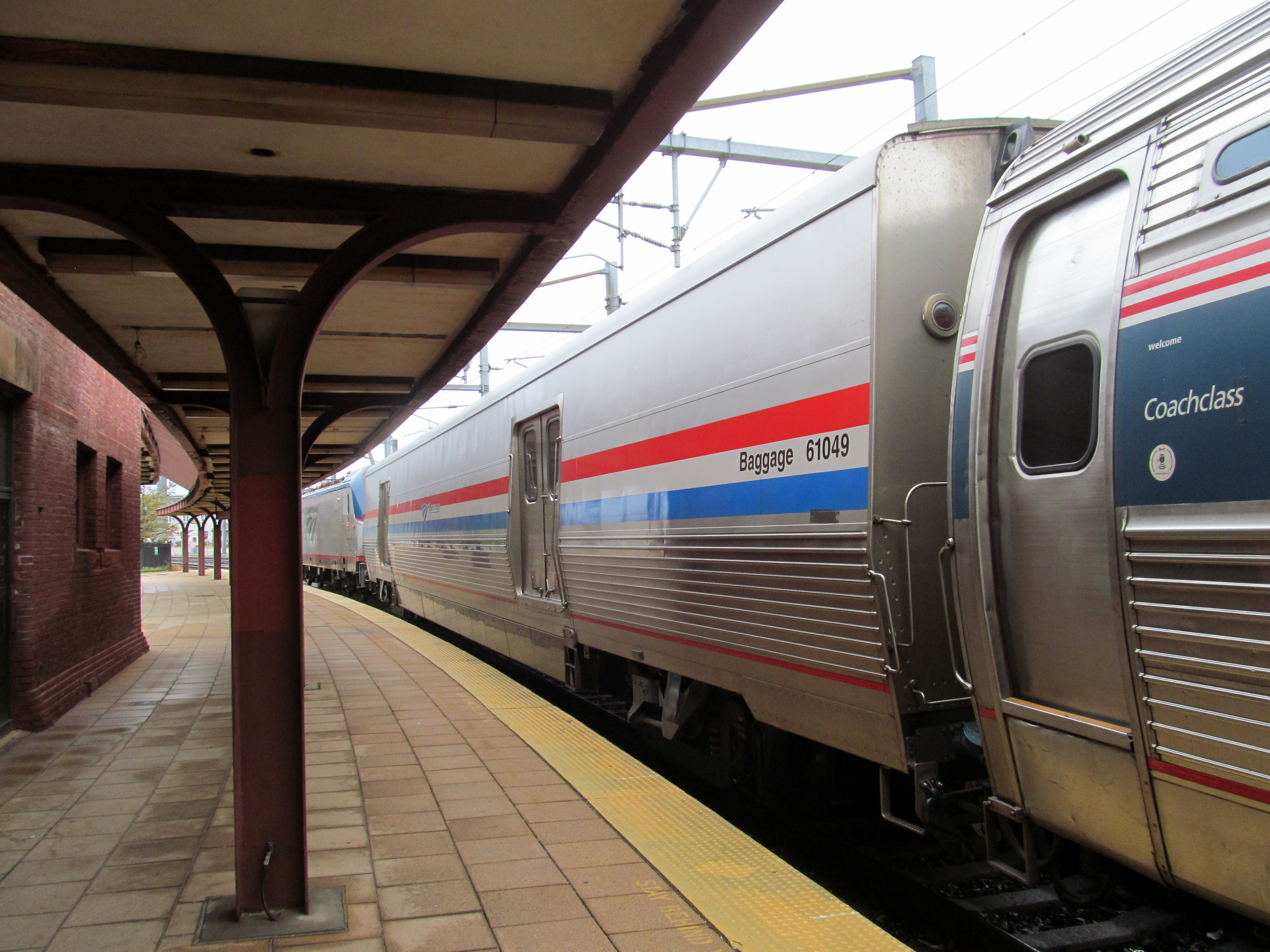
A Viewliner II baggage car at New London in 2016

Amtrak allows carry-on baggage on all routes; services with baggage cars allow checked baggage at selected stations. With the passage of the Wicker Amendment in 2010, passengers are allowed to put lawfully owned, unloaded firearms in checked Amtrak baggage, reversing a decade-long ban on such carriage.

The Amtrak Express cargo service used to provide small-package and less-than-truckload shipping between most Amtrak stations that handle checked baggage (over 100 cities). Cargo traveled alongside checked luggage in baggage cars. However, the service was suspended in 2020. As of July 2025, there have been no plans to resume service.

Amtrak is popular among bicycle touring enthusiasts due to the ease of riding with a bike. In contrast to airlines, which require riders to dismantle their bicycles and place them in specialized bags, most Amtrak trains have onboard bike racks in either the coaches or checked baggage car. Bicycle reservations are required on most routes and cost up to $20.

=== Food services ===
Amtrak's signature Flat Iron Steak, served in traditional dining cars

On most routes, Amtrak provides a café where passengers can purchase food and drinks.

On long-distance trains, passengers in first-class sleeper service accommodations are provided complimentary meals. The Cardinal, City of New Orleans, Crescent, Lake Shore Limited, and the Texas Eagle between Chicago and San Antonio have "Flex Dining", which features premade dishes which are heated on board. All other long-distance routes have "Traditional Dining", which features meals prepared onboard by a chef in the dining car.

== Labor issues ==
As of 2023, the average Amtrak employee annual salary was $121,000 per year.

Most Amtrak workers are legally classified as "railroad employees" and thus make contributions to the federal Railroad Retirement system. The contribution rate is determined on an industry-wide basis, rather than with reference to the employer for whom the employees work; while most freight railroads employ a large number of contract workers to reduce the amount owed, Amtrak is prohibited by law from contracting out many positions and thus contributes disproportionately more funding to the system. Some critics, such as the National Association of Railroad Passengers, argue that Amtrak is thereby "subsidizing" freight railroad pensions by as much as US$150 million/year.

In recent times, efforts at reforming passenger rail have addressed labor issues. In 1997 Congress released Amtrak from a prohibition on hiring contractors outside the corporation (and outside its unions); since that time, many of Amtrak's employees have been working without a contract. The most recent contract, signed in 1999, was mainly retroactive.

Because of the fragmentation of railroad unions, Amtrak workers are represented by 14 separate trade unions, with as many as 24 simultaneous contracts between them as of 2009, a situation which has made contract negotiations more difficult. Former Amtrak president Alexander Kummant followed a cooperative posture with Amtrak's unions, ruling out plans to privatize large parts of the company's workforce.

== Environmental impact ==
Per passenger mile, Amtrak is 30–40 percent more energy-efficient than commercial airlines and automobiles overall, though the exact figures for particular routes depend on load factor along with other variables. Amtrak's rolling stock is mostly diesel, with electric locomotives being used along the Northeast Corridor and a limited number of dual-mode locomotives along the Empire Corridor; electrified trains are considerably more efficient than diesels, produce less carbon dioxide, and can feed energy captured from regenerative braking back into the electrical grid. As of 2023, 1% of rail in the United States is electrified. On select areas of Amtrak's Northeast Corridor, where some locomotives are electrified, Amtrak emits up to 70-80% less greenhouse gas emissions than personal vehicle and flight travel.

In 2005, Amtrak's carbon dioxide equivalent emissions per passenger were 0.411 lbs/mi (0.116 kg per km). This amount is similar to that of a car with two people, about twice as high as the UK rail average (where more of the system is electrified), about four times the average US motorcoach, and about eight times a Finnish electric intercity train or fully loaded fifty-seat coach. It is, however, about two thirds of the raw CO_{2}-equivalent emissions of a long-distance domestic flight.

In 2018, specifically in northeastern US, Amtrak's carbon dioxide equivalent emissions per passenger were 0.280 lbs/mi for diesel locomotives and 0.134 lbs/mi for electric locomotives. The average emissions for the combined ratio of Amtrak diesel and electric routes is 0.227 lbs/mi. Per route, passenger rail travel covers and average of 30% more miles than air travel due to the nature of its course and path. Rail creates less carbon dioxide emissions than flying for trips up to and beyond 1,100 miles, but its CO2 advantage fade on longer routes past 500 miles.

Diesel trains cause additional regional air pollution, impacting the ecosystems around the sites of operation. More stops along train routes can lead to higher greenhouse gas emissions. Delays in operation can lead to excess locomotive idling, also leading to higher greenhouse gas emissions.

Amtrak rail facilities located in Delaware were cited as the state's largest source of polychlorinated biphenyl (PCB) contamination into the Delaware River, which build up in the tissue of animals and are human carcinogens.

=== Sustainability efforts ===
In 2020, Amtrak announced a goal to reduce its greenhouse gas emissions 40 percent below 2010 levels by 2030. Amtrak has also set a target of achieving net-zero emissions by 2045. To achieve this target, Amtrak plans to source 100 percent of its electricity from renewable energy by the year 2035. As of 2023, Amtrak obtains 61% of its electricity from carbon-free sources and is making gains towards its sustainability goals.

To further advance its emissions targets, Amtrak has implemented a range of sustainability measures. These measures include reducing excessive diesel locomotive idling, acquiring more fuel-efficient electric and diesel locomotives, procuring cleaner energy for electric operations, and opting for more environmentally friendly lighting in passenger railcars and stations. Amtrak also requires all new management hires to complete sustainability and emissions training courses.

=== Environmental effects on Amtrak ===
Amtrak railways and surrounding infrastructure are susceptible to degradation by natural causes over time. Railways experience water damage from climate-change backed increases in rainfall in wet areas, and rail buckling caused by hotter and dryer seasons in naturally dry areas.

In September 2021, the remnants of Hurricane Ida flooded the Amtrak Northeast Corridor running from Boston to Washington, D.C., and caused it to shut down for an entire day. In February 2023, heavy snowfall and debris on tracks caused major disruptions from delays to cancellations.

== Public funding ==
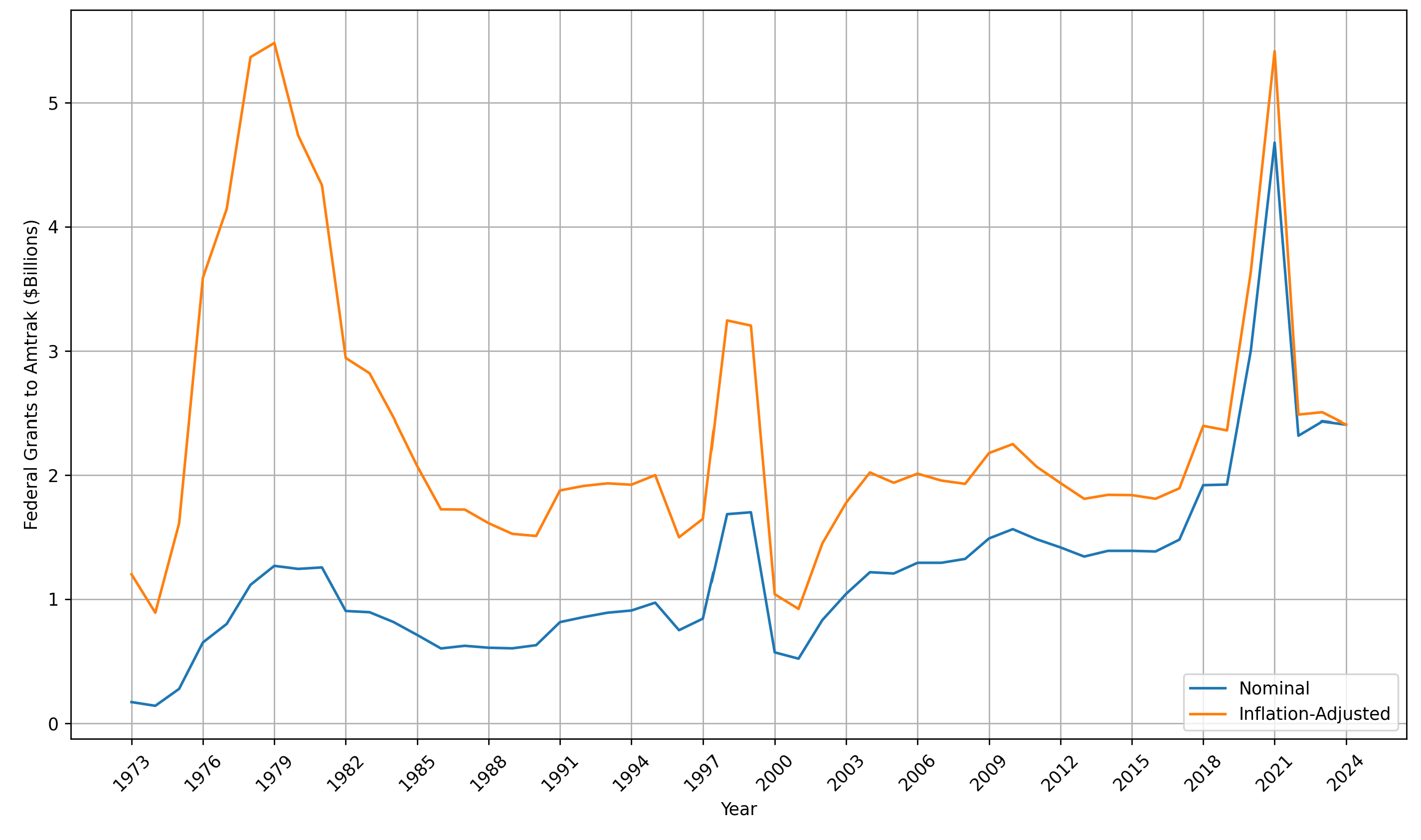
Federal Grant Funding for Amtrak (both nominal and inflation-adjusted), 1973-2024

Amtrak receives annual appropriations from federal and state governments to supplement operating and capital programs.

=== Funding history ===
==== 1970s to 1990s ====
Amtrak commenced operations in 1971 with $40 million in direct federal aid, $100 million in federally insured loans, and a somewhat larger private contribution. Officials expected that Amtrak would break even by 1974, but those expectations proved unrealistic and annual direct federal aid reached a 17-year high in 1981 of $1.25 billion. During the Reagan administration, appropriations were halved and by 1986, federal support fell to a decade low of $601 million, almost none of which were capital appropriations. In the late 1980s and early 1990s, Congress continued the reductionist trend even while Amtrak expenses held steady or rose. Amtrak was forced to borrow to meet short-term operating needs, and by 1995 Amtrak was on the brink of a cash crisis and was unable to continue to service its debts. In response, in 1997 Congress authorized $5.2 billion for Amtrak over the next five years – largely to complete the Acela capital project – on the condition that Amtrak submit to the ultimatum of self-sufficiency by 2003 or liquidation. While Amtrak made financial improvements during this period, it did not achieve self-sufficiency.

==== 2000s ====
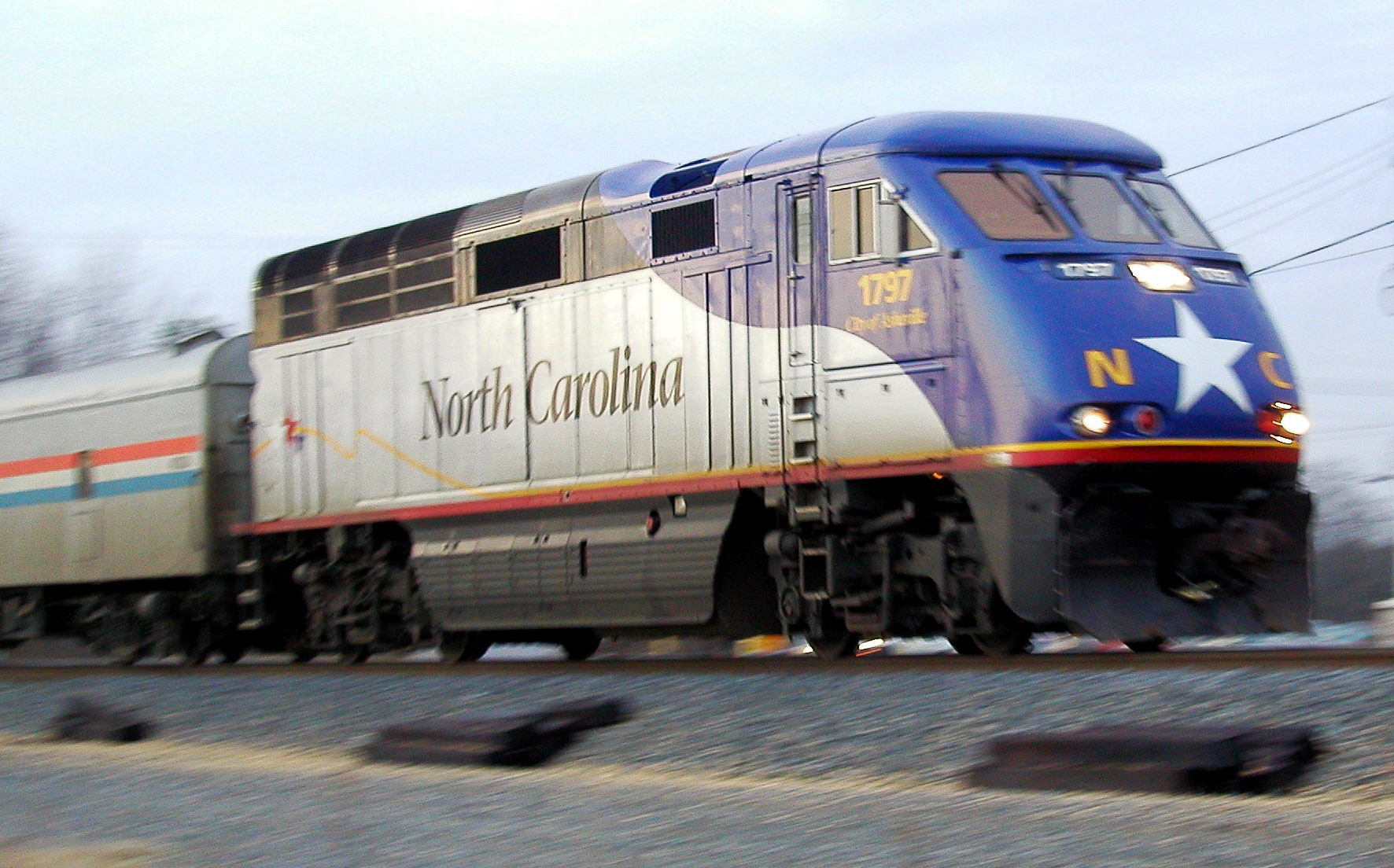
Amtrak's Piedmont near Charlotte, North Carolina, with a state-owned locomotive. This route is run under a partnership with the North Carolina Department of Transportation, 2003.

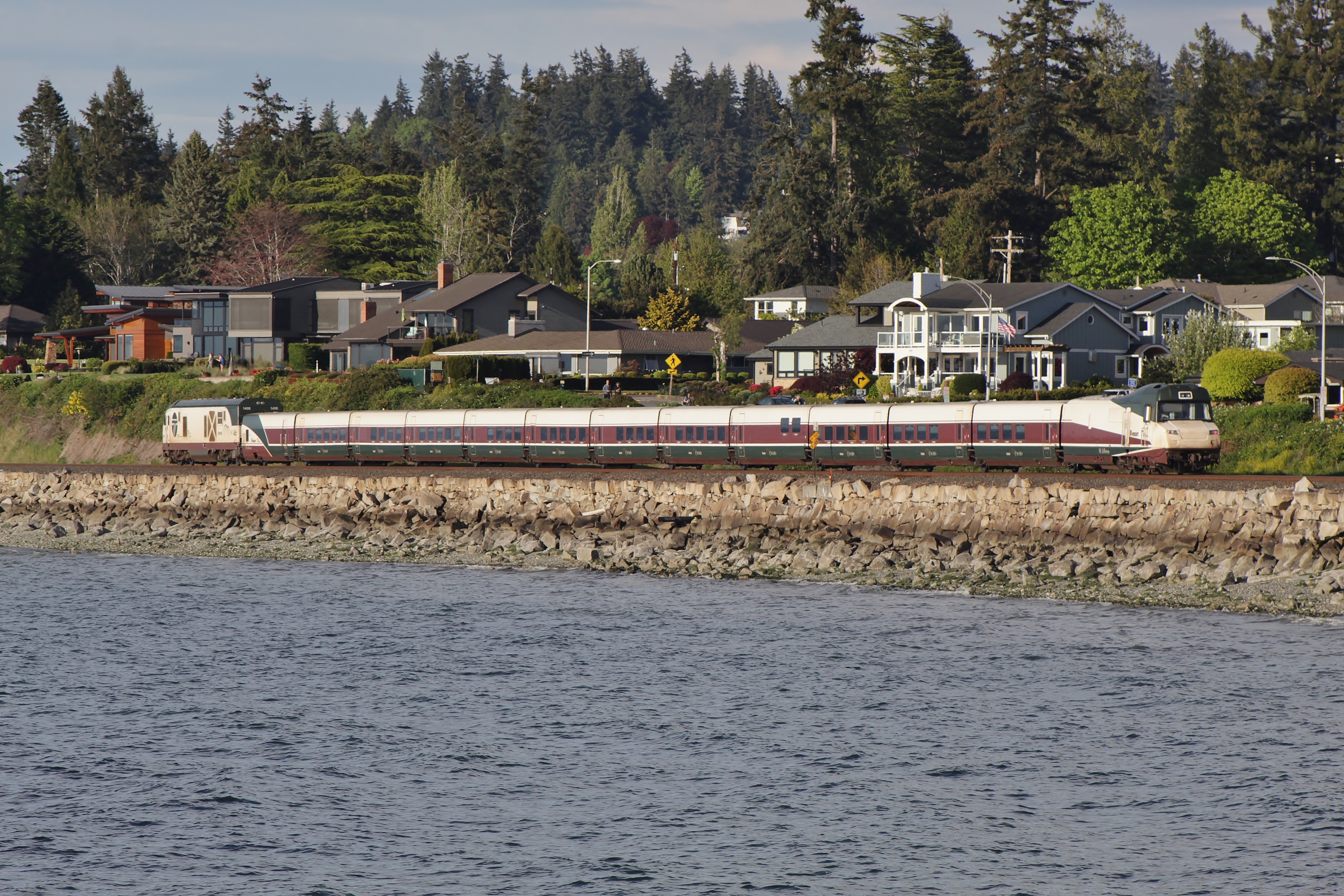
Amtrak Cascades service with tilting Talgo trainsets in Edmonds, Washington, 2025

In 2004, a stalemate in federal support of Amtrak forced cutbacks in services and routes as well as the resumption of deferred maintenance. In fiscal 2004 and 2005, Congress appropriated about $1.2 billion for Amtrak, $300 million more than President George W. Bush had requested. However, the company's board requested $1.8 billion through fiscal 2006, the majority of which (about $1.3 billion) would be used to bring infrastructure, rolling stock, and motive power back to a state of good repair. In Congressional testimony, the DOT Inspector General confirmed that Amtrak would need at least $1.4 billion to $1.5 billion in fiscal 2006 and $2 billion in fiscal 2007 just to maintain the status quo. In 2006, Amtrak received just under $1.4 billion, with the condition that Amtrak would reduce (but not eliminate) food and sleeper service losses. Thus, dining service was simplified and now requires two fewer on-board service workers. Only Auto Train and Empire Builder services continue regular made-on-board meal service. In 2010 the Senate approved a bill to provide $1.96 billion to Amtrak, but cut the approval for high-speed rail to a $1 billion appropriation.

State governments have partially filled the breach left by reductions in federal aid. Several states have entered into operating partnerships with Amtrak, notably California, Pennsylvania, Illinois, Michigan, Oregon, Missouri, Washington, North Carolina, Oklahoma, Texas, Wisconsin, Vermont, Maine, and New York, as well as the Canadian province of British Columbia, which provides some of the resources for the operation of the Cascades route.

With the dramatic rise in gasoline prices during 2007–08, Amtrak saw record ridership. Capping a steady five-year increase in ridership overall, regional lines saw 12% year-over-year growth in May 2008. In October 2007, the Senate passed S. 294, the Passenger Rail Improvement and Investment Act of 2007 (70–22), sponsored by Senators Frank Lautenberg and Trent Lott. Despite a veto threat by President Bush, a similar bill passed the House on June 11, 2008, with a veto-proof margin (311–104). The final bill, spurred on by the September 12 Metrolink collision in California and retitled Passenger Rail Investment and Improvement Act of 2008, was signed into law by President Bush on October 16, 2008. The bill appropriates $2.6 billion a year in Amtrak funding through 2013.

==== 2010s ====
Amtrak points out that in 2010, its farebox recovery (percentage of operating costs covered by revenues generated by passenger fares) was 79%, the highest reported for any U.S. passenger railroad. This increased to 94.9% in 2018. In 2019, which was Amtrak's best year in farebox recovery, Amtrak was short by only $29.4 million from breaking even for that year.

Amtrak has argued that it needs to increase capital program costs in 2013 in order to replace old train equipment because the multi-year maintenance costs for those trains exceed what it would cost to simply buy new equipment that would not need to be repaired for several years. However, despite an initial request for more than $2.1 billion in funding for the year, the company had to deal with a year-over-year cut in 2013 federal appropriations, dropping to under $1.4 billion for the first time in several years. Amtrak stated in 2010 that the backlog of needed repairs of the track it owns on the Northeast Corridor included over 200 bridges, most dating to the 19th century, tunnels under Baltimore dating to the American Civil War era and functionally obsolete track switches which would cost $5.2 billion to repair (more than triple Amtrak's total annual budget). Amtrak's budget is allocated on only a yearly basis, and it has been argued by Joseph Vranich that this makes multi-year development programs and long-term fiscal planning difficult if not impossible.

In Fiscal Year 2011, the U.S. Congress granted Amtrak $563 million for operating and $922 million for capital programs.

==== 2020s ====
In 2021, the 117th United States Congress passed and President Joe Biden signed the Infrastructure Investment and Jobs Act, which directly appropriated $66 billion for rail over a five-year period, of which at least $18 billion is designated for expanding passenger rail service to new corridors, and it authorized an additional $36 billion. Amtrak received $22 billion in advance appropriations and $19 billion in fully authorized funds.

=== Controversy ===
Government aid to Amtrak was controversial from the beginning. The formation of Amtrak in 1971 was criticized as a bailout serving corporate rail interests and union railroaders, not the traveling public. Critics have asserted that Amtrak has proven incapable of operating as a business and that it does not provide valuable transportation services meriting public support, making it a "mobile money-burning machine". Many fiscal conservatives have argued that subsidies should be ended, national rail service terminated, and the NEC turned over to private interests. Critics also question Amtrak's energy efficiency, though the U.S. Department of Energy considers Amtrak among the most energy-efficient forms of transportation.

The Rail Passenger Service Act of 1970, which established Amtrak, specifically states that, "The Corporation will not be an agency or establishment of the United States Government". Then common stock was issued in 1971 to railroads that contributed capital and equipment; these shares convey almost no benefits, but their holders declined a 2002 buy-out offer by Amtrak. There are currently 109.4 million shares of preferred stock, at a par value of $100 per share, all held by the US government. As of February 2015, there were 9.4 million shares of common stock, with a par value of $10 per share, held by American Premier Underwriters (53%), BNSF (35%), Canadian Pacific (7%) and Canadian National (5%).

== Leadership ==
In addition to the United States Secretary of Transportation and its CEO, Amtrak's Board of Directors has eight presidentially-nominated and senate-confirmed seats. Presidentially appointed members serve nominally five-year terms but are allowed to serve until their successor is confirmed, and no more than five of the eight may belong to one political party. Of the eight presidentially appointed members, a minimum of two must and maximum of four may reside along or near the Northeast Corridor (defined as Connecticut, Delaware, the District of Columbia, Maryland, Massachusetts, New Jersey, New York, Pennsylvania, and Rhode Island), while the other four to six must reside in a state served by an Amtrak-operated long-distance or state-supported route outside of the Northeast Corridor. At least one of these eight must be an individual with a disability.

The Secretary may be represented at Board meetings by their designee.

=== Current board members ===
The current board members as of September 18, 2025 are the following:

Position	Name	State of residence	Party	Confirmed	Term expires
Chair	Anthony Coscia	New Jersey	Democratic	June 22, 2010; December 15, 2015; January 23, 2024	January 2029
Vice Chair	Joel Szabat	Maryland	Republican	January 23, 2024	January 2029
Member	Lanhee Chen	California	Republican	December 21, 2024	December 2029
Member	Elaine Marie Clegg	Idaho	Democratic	December 21, 2024	December 2029
Member	Christopher Koos	Illinois	Democratic	January 23, 2024	January 2029
Member	David Michael Capozzi	Maryland	Democratic	December 21, 2024	December 2029
Member	Ronald L. Batory	New Mexico	Republican	December 21, 2024	December 2029
Member	Robert Gleason	Pennsylvania	Republican	September 18, 2025	September 2030
Secretary of Transportation	Sean Duffy	New Jersey	Republican	January 28, 2025	No fixed term
CEO (non-voting)	Vacant				No fixed term

== Incidents ==
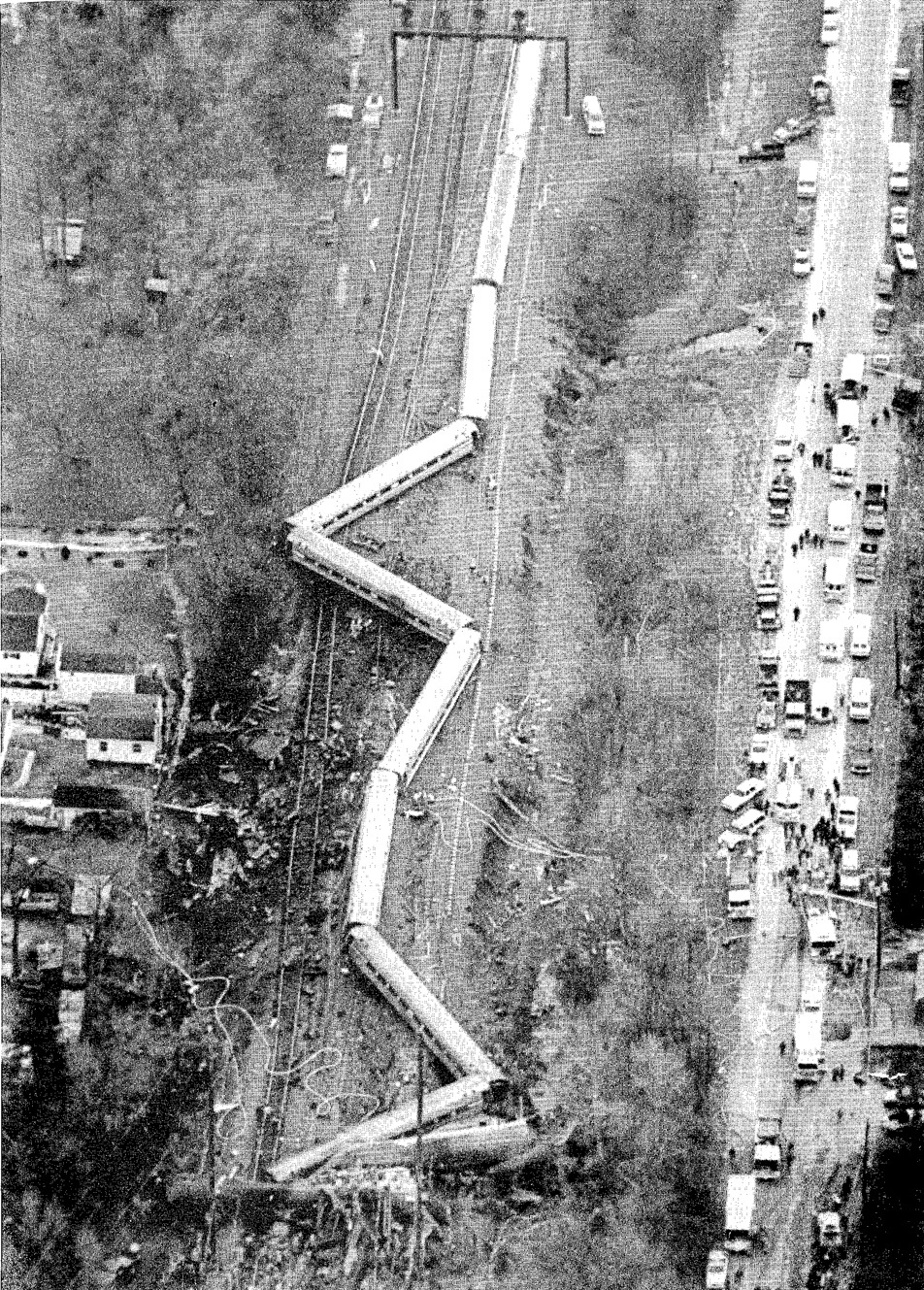
Aerial view of the 1987 Maryland train collision

The following are major accidents and incidents that involved Amtrak trains:

Event	Train	Date	Location	Description	Deaths	Injuries
1971 Salem, Illinois, derailment	City of New Orleans	June 10, 1971	Salem, Illinois	The City of New Orleans derailed due to a broken locomotive axle.	11	163
1979 Harvey train crash	Shawnee	October 12, 1979	Harvey, Illinois	The Shawnee collided with a stationary Illinois Central Gulf freight train due to misaligned switches changed by a switchman shortly before the train passed them.	2	38
1987 Maryland train collision	Colonial	January 4, 1987	Chase, Maryland	The Colonial collided with three Conrail locomotives which had overrun signals.	16	164
1990 Back Bay, Massachusetts train collision	Night Owl	December 12, 1990	Back Bay, Boston, Massachusetts	The Night Owl derailed due to excessive speed on a curve and collided with a Massachusetts Bay Transportation Authority commuter train on an adjacent track.	0	453
1993 Big Bayou Canot rail accident	Sunset Limited	September 22, 1993	Mobile, Alabama	The Sunset Limited derailed on a bridge which had been damaged by a barge.	47	103
1995 Palo Verde, Arizona derailment	Sunset Limited	October 9, 1995	Palo Verde, Arizona	The Sunset Limited derailed because of track sabotage.	1	78
1996 Maryland train collision	Capitol Limited	February 16, 1996	Silver Spring, Maryland	The Capitol Limited collided with a Maryland Area Regional Commuter train which had overrun signals.	11	26
1999 Bourbonnais, Illinois, train crash	City of New Orleans	March 15, 1999	Bourbonnais, Illinois	The City of New Orleans collided with a semi-truck hauling steel that was trying to beat the train across a grade crossing. Eleven of the train's fourteen passenger cars derailed, hitting freight cars on an adjacent track.	11	122
2015 Philadelphia train derailment	Northeast Regional	May 12, 2015	Philadelphia, Pennsylvania	A Northeast Regional derailed due to excessive speed on a curve.	8	200+
2017 Washington train derailment	Cascades	December 18, 2017	DuPont, Washington	A Cascades train derailed due to excessive speed on a curve.	3	62
2018 Cayce, South Carolina train collision	Silver Star	February 4, 2018	Cayce, South Carolina	The Silver Star collided head-on into a parked CSX freight train, due to a track switch being improperly set by the conductor of the CSX train.	2	116
2021 Montana train derailment	Empire Builder	September 25, 2021	Joplin, Montana	The westbound Empire Builder derailed at the control point East Buelow, with 146 passengers and 16 crew members on board.	3	50
2022 Missouri train derailment	Southwest Chief	June 27, 2022	Mendon, Missouri	The eastbound Southwest Chief struck a dump truck on the tracks and derailed.	4	50

After settling for $17 million in the 2017 Washington state train crash, to prevent further lawsuits, the board adopted a new policy requiring arbitration.

== See also ==
=== Topics dealing with Amtrak ===
- Amtrak Arrow Reservation System
- Amtrak paint schemes
- Amtrak Police Department
- Amtrak Standard Stations Program
- Beech Grove Shops
- History of rail transport in the United States
- List of Amtrak stations
- List of preserved Amtrak rolling stock
- Positive train control
- Visible Intermodal Prevention and Response team (VIPR) – TSA's rail security operations
- Railway electrification system

=== Other railway companies ===
- Brightline – Privately operated higher-speed intercity rail service between Miami and Orlando, Florida, which began revenue service in 2023. Brightline is also constructing a high-speed rail route, dubbed Brightline West that will run between Los Angeles and Las Vegas, predicted to open in late 2029.
- Via Rail (Canada) – connects with Amtrak from Montreal, Vancouver, and Toronto
- List of railway companies
