= Amtrak Arrow Reservation System =

Train reservation system used by Amtrak

Amtrak's Arrow Reservation System is used nationally in the United States by Amtrak employees to take reservations, check train status, and monitor Amtrak equipment throughout the 30,000 miles (48,000 km) of the Amtrak network. Arrow was created to make Amtrak's reservation taking more simple. It went online November 1, 1981. Arrow development is done in-house by Amtrak developers.

The Arrow application is similar to most major airline reservation systems, and runs on IBM's Transaction Processing Facility system. The system is used directly by Amtrak employees and travel agents, and is also the basis for Amtrak.com and Quik-Trak reservations.

On August 26, 2007, the system was the victim of a major power outage at the data center, which impacted Amtrak nationwide. All Amtrak agents were forced to hand-write tickets, and were unable to use the system for any other purposes.

In 2015 a project to upgrade Amtrak's reservation infrastructure left the future of Arrow uncertain with a decision to upgrade or replace it unmade.

== See also ==
- List of Amtrak station codes – alphabetical by 3-letter Arrow ticketing code
- List of Amtrak stations – alphabetical by city name
