= Quasi-corporation =

Unincorporated entity functioning like a corporation

A quasi-corporation is an entity that exercises some of the functions of a corporation, but has not been granted separate legal personality by statute. For example, a public corporation with limited authority and powers such as a county or school district is a quasi-corporation.

== Definition ==
A quasi-corporation is an entity that is not incorporated or otherwise legally established, but which functions as if it were a corporation.

== United States ==
=== Federal government ===
When created by the federal government of the United States, these entities are commonly called quasi-public corporations. These now or in the past have included telegraph and telephone companies, oil and gas, water, and electrical power companies, and irrigation companies. Some examples of quasi-public corporations in the US are Sallie Mae, Fannie Mae/Freddie Mac, Amtrak (National Railroad Passenger Corporation), the Communications Satellite Corporation (“COMSAT”), and the US Postal Service.

=== State and local government ===
In the United States, such entities established, supported, or controlled by a city, county, or township may be called quasi-municipal corporations.
