= Budd Metroliner =

Class of American electric railcars

Metroliner
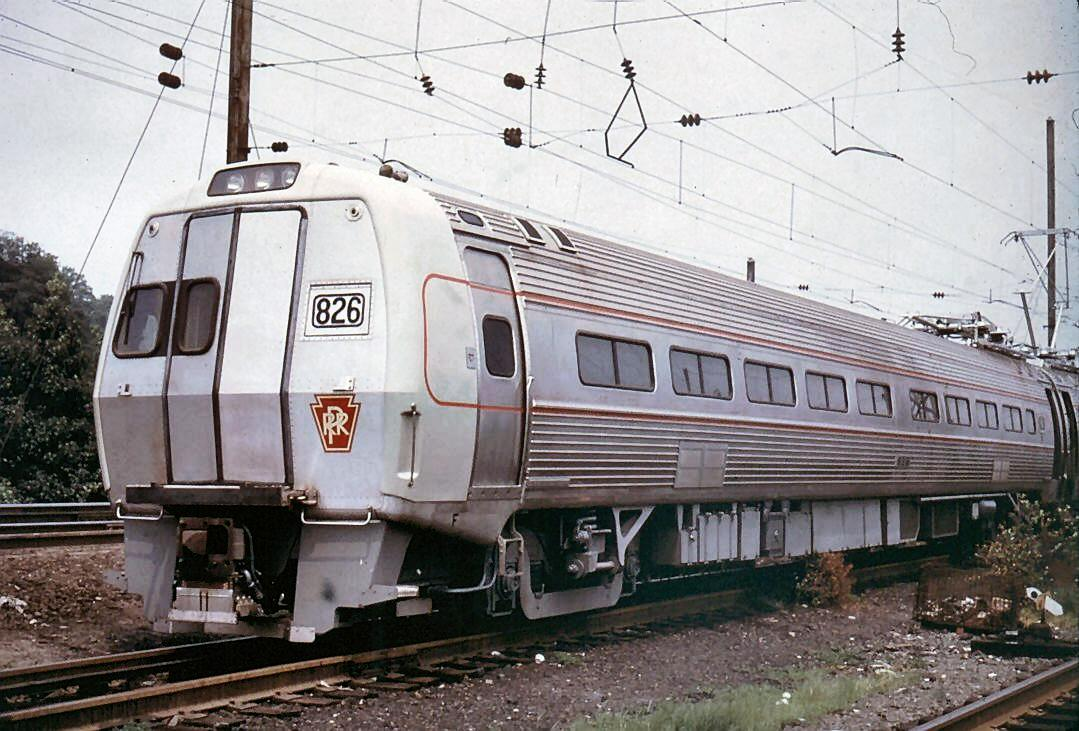
- Metroliner 826 in Pennsylvania Railroad livery before acceptance, circa 1968. All Metroliners, including this car, began revenue service with Penn Central markings.
- Manufacturer: Budd Company
- Constructed: 1967–1970
- Entered service: January 16, 1969
- Refurbished: 1972–1974, 1979–1980
- Retired: 1988
- Number built: 61 (31 coaches, 20 snack, 10 parlor cars)
- Fleet numbers: 800–830, 850–869, 880–889
- Operators: Penn Central (1969–1971); Amtrak (1971–1988)
- Line served: Northeast Corridor

Specifications
- Car length: 85 ft 0 in (25.91 m)
- Width: 10 ft 6 in (3.20 m)
- Height: 14 ft 10 in (4.52 m) (pantographs locked down)
- Floor height: 51 1/2 in (1,308 mm)
- Platform height: 51 in (1,295 mm) (high)
- Doors: Two per side
- Maximum speed: 150 mph (240 km/h) (design); 120 mph (190 km/h) (in service)
- Weight: 166,000 lb (75,000 kg)
- Traction motors: 4× Westinghouse 1461-A 300 hp (220 kW) (coaches); 4× GE 1254-A1 255 hp (190 kW) (parlor and snack cars)
- Power output: 1,200 hp (890 kW) (coaches); 1,020 hp (760 kW) (parlor and snack cars)
- Transmission: Rectified direct current supplied via four ignitron tubes to a phase angle controller
- Electric systems: Overhead line: 11–13.5 kV 25 Hz AC; 11–13.5 kV 60 Hz AC; 25 kV 60 Hz AC (never used)
- Current collection: Pantograph
- UIC classification: Bo′Bo′
- AAR wheel arrangement: B-B
- Bogies: Outboard bearing, equalized
- Braking systems: Electro-pneumatic, dynamic
- Coupling system: Tomlinson (later changed to AAR)
- Track gauge: 4 ft 8 1/2 in (1,435 mm) standard gauge

The Budd Metroliner was a class of American electric multiple unit (EMU) railcar designed for first-class, high-speed service between New York City and Washington, D.C., on the Northeast Corridor. They were designed for operation up to 150 miles per hour (240 km/h): what would have been the first high speed rail service in the Western Hemisphere. Although 164 mph (264 km/h) was reached during test runs, track conditions and electrical issues limited top speeds to 120 mph (190 km/h) in revenue service. The single-ended units were designed to be arranged in two-car sets, which were in turn coupled into four to eight-car trains.

The Pennsylvania Railroad (PRR) ordered 61 Metroliner cars from the Budd Company in 1966 as part of a collaboration with the federal government to improve railroad service between New York, Philadelphia, and Washington. After difficulties testing the cars, PRR successor Penn Central began its eponymous Metroliner service on January 16, 1969. Amtrak took over the service in 1971.

Despite high aspirations, the Metroliner cars proved to have poor reliability, with less than two-thirds of the fleet in service at many times. Four cars were successfully overhauled for improved operation in 1974, but the rebuilding cost more than the original purchase price of the cars. Thirty-three more cars were overhauled in 1979–1980. However, by this time, new AEM-7 locomotives pulling Amfleet cars could match Metroliner schedules with higher reliability. Metroliners were withdrawn from Metroliner service entirely in 1981; they served until 1988 on Keystone Service trains.

Despite their electrical flaws, the Metroliners proved mechanically sound. Amtrak ordered over 600 non-powered Amfleet cars (which are based on the Metroliner design and also manufactured by Budd) in the mid-1970s. Beginning in 1987, Amtrak converted 23 former Metroliners for use as cab control cars on corridor trains. Fourteen more cars were used with minimal modifications: six as cab cars and eight as trailer coaches. Most former Metroliners were scrapped between 2003 and 2011. However, some cab cars remain in use on Keystone Service and Amtrak Hartford Line trains. Three former Metroliners have also been converted to technology testing or track measurement cars, and one more is used by Amtrak as a special-purpose business car. One original Metroliner is preserved at the Railroad Museum of Pennsylvania.

== History ==
=== Design and production ===
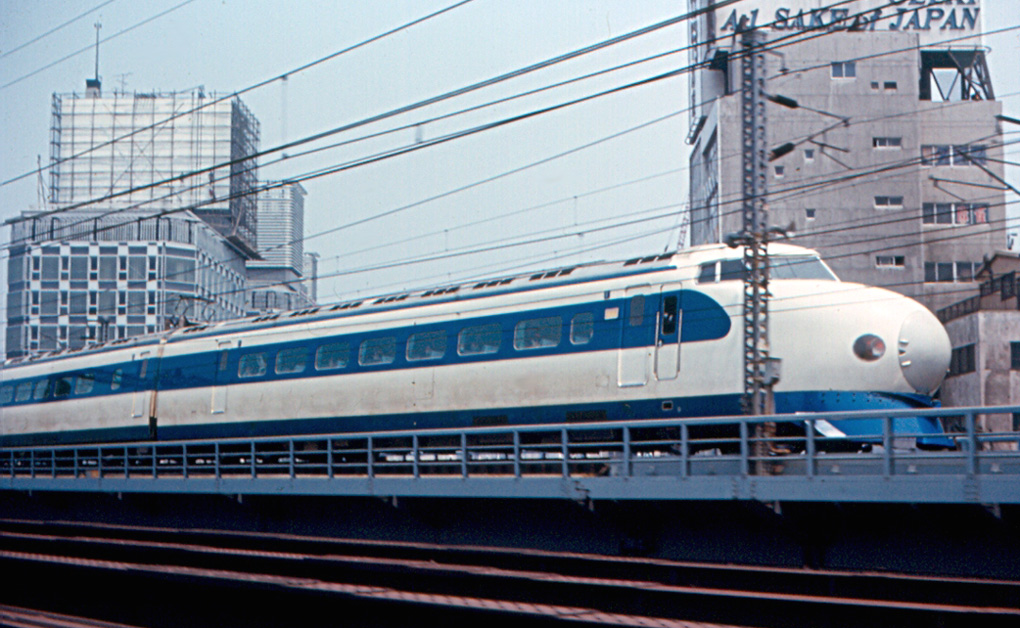
Metroliners were designed to exceed the 130 mph (210 km/h) top speeds on the Tōkaidō Shinkansen in Japan, seen here in 1967

On August 9, 1965, with the High Speed Ground Transportation Act of 1965 pending, representatives from the Pennsylvania Railroad (PRR), the United States Department of Transportation (DOT), and a private consulting firm began setting specifications for an electric multiple unit high speed passenger train. The PRR and the DOT disagreed on several technical details. The PRR wanted cars capable of 125 miles per hour (201 km/h), while the DOT desired 150 miles per hour (240 km/h) or even 160 miles per hour (260 km/h) to beat Japan's Tōkaidō Shinkansen. The higher speed was chosen, but caused numerous design issues. The PRR wanted cars with cabs on both ends for maximum flexibility, while the DOT wanted 4-car sets; two-car sets with a cab on each end were chosen as a compromise. The Act was signed into law on September 30. The Johnson Administration saw the new service as political capital and pushed for an aggressive schedule.

On May 6, 1966, the High Speed Ground Transportation project ordered 50 railcars from the Budd Company, with delivery beginning in September 1967. The PRR paid $10.4 million, with the remaining $9.6 million coming from the federal government. The order consisted of 20 coaches with Westinghouse propulsion systems, and 20 snack-bar coaches and 10 parlor cars with General Electric (GE) propulsion systems. Coaches had 76 seats, snack cars had 60 seats and parlor cars had 34 seats. On August 30, 1966, Governor William Scranton of Pennsylvania announced plans to purchase 11 additional railcars for upgraded 80 mph (130 km/h) PRR regional service between Philadelphia and Harrisburg. The cars were ordered through Philadelphia commuter agency SEPTA, as the state was not permitted to contract directly with the PRR. The state, SEPTA, and PRR reached an agreement on November 3; the state and SEPTA would each pay $2 million, funded mostly by mass transit grants from the newly formed Department of Housing and Urban Development (HUD), and the PRR would receive a free 15-year lease of the cars. The PRR soon withdrew after complaints from the Red Arrow Lines and Capitol Trailways (which operated non-subsidized services which competed with the PRR for passengers), and the HUD grants were later found not to be applicable to intercity service, but the order was still placed.

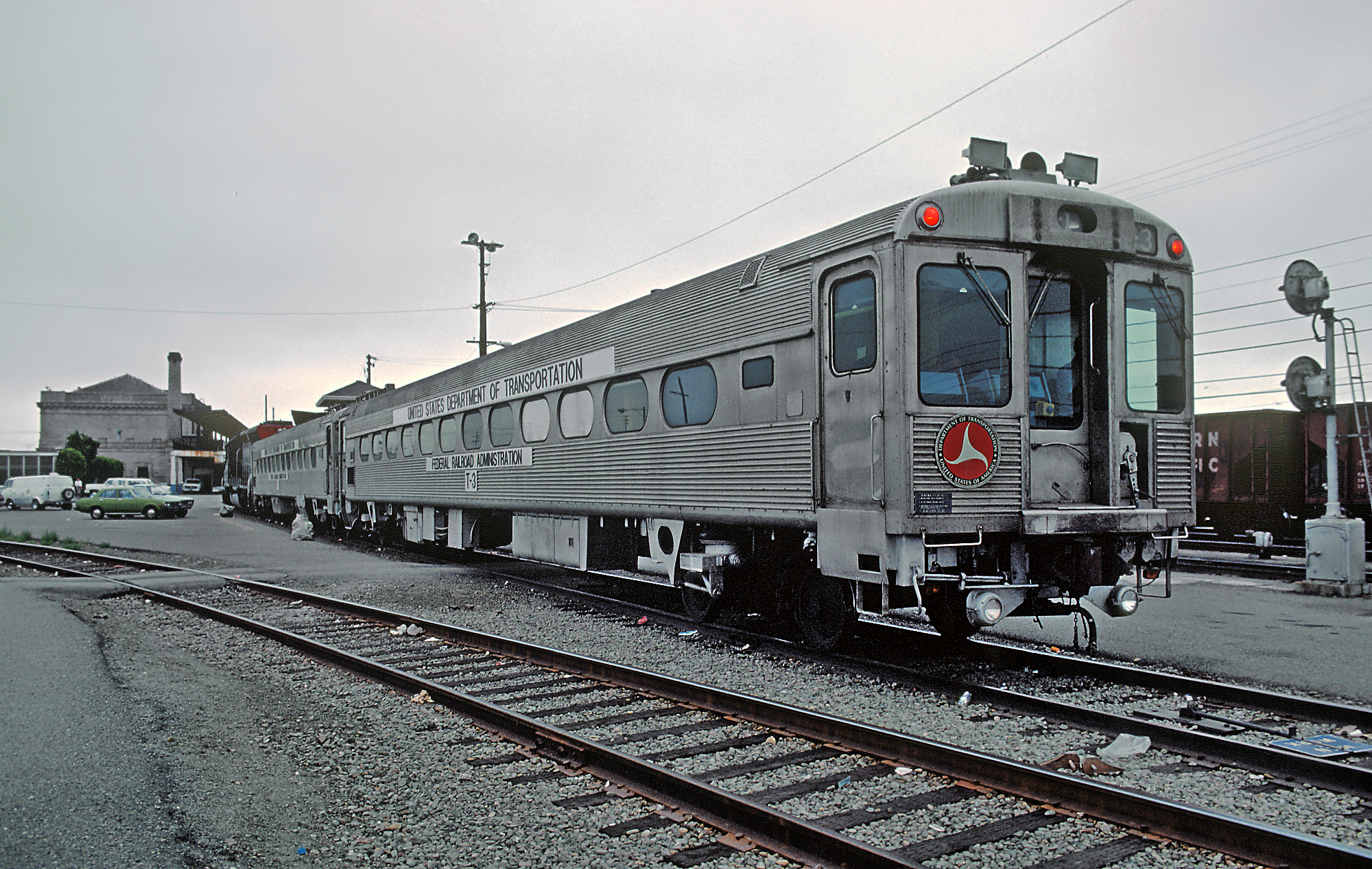
This USDOT Silverliner, seen here in 1981, was used to test infrastructure for the Metroliners in 1967.

The ancestor of the Metroliner multiple unit railcar was the Budd Pioneer III which had been developed for the Pennsylvania Railroad in 1958 as a new concept in long distance passenger service in the east. The cars used new propulsion technologies and lightweight construction in an effort to improve performance compared with older electric multiple unit technology. After a fleet of 55 improved Pioneer III cars referred to as Silverliners were ordered for commuter trains in the Philadelphia area, the United States Department of Transportation placed a follow-up order for 4 Silverliners, specially modified for high speed operation on the PRR's Northeast Corridor. Equipped with several modifications, including a semi-streamlined slab end on the front of the lead car, the experimental train ran a series of test runs, reaching a speed of 156 miles per hour (251 km/h) on April 2, 1967. This success allowed Metroliner testing to begin.

The new railcars were built for high-floor boarding, with only one door on each car able to serve low platforms. Along with the M1 series built for New York commuter service at the same time, these were among the first high-floor-only railcars in mainline service in the country. High-level platforms were constructed at several stations beginning in 1967. In May 1967, an initial service date of October 29, 1967 was announced. The name "Metroliner" for the railcars was proposed in June, and one unit was displayed at the Budd plant in July.

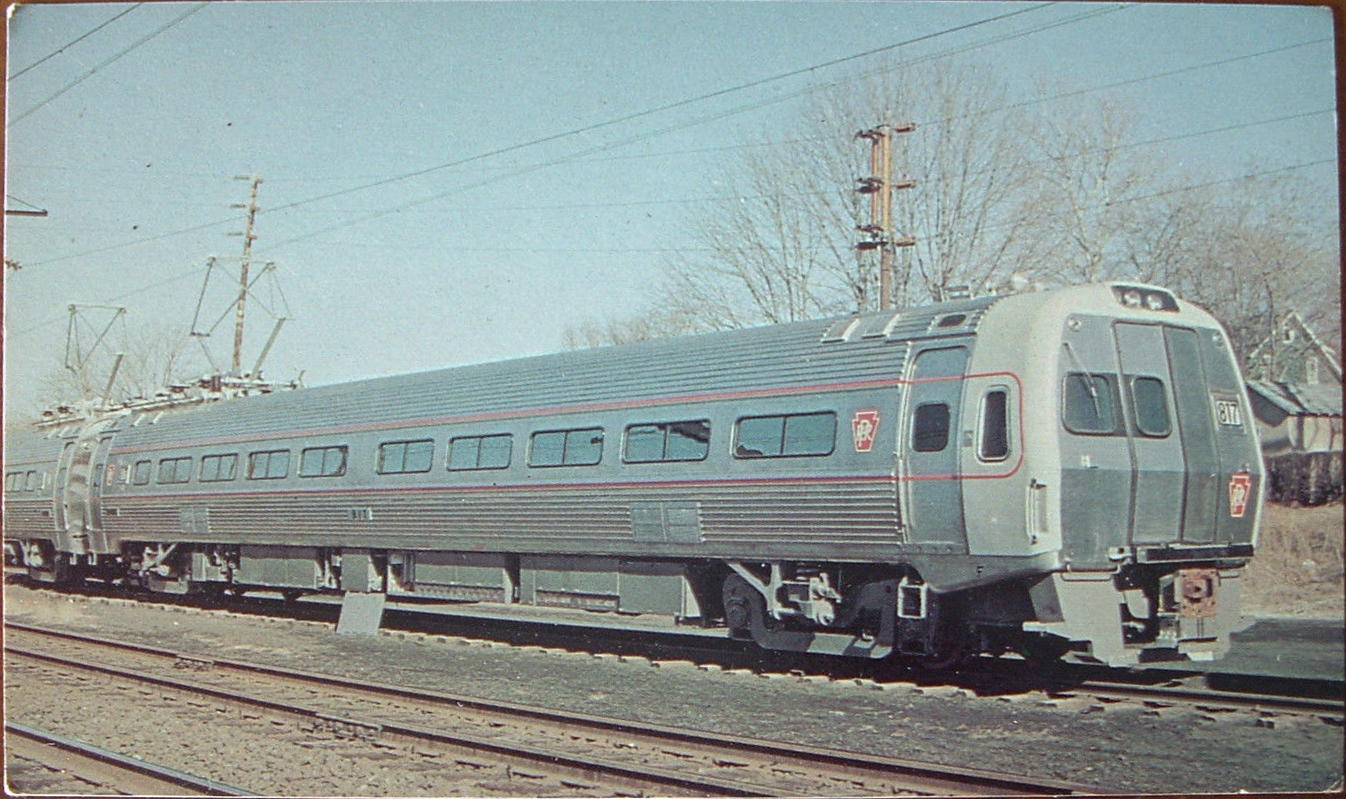
A Metroliner in PRR livery sitting on the Budd delivery siding off Reading Railroad's New York Branch in March 1968

The first Westinghouse-powered Metroliners were delivered to the testing location at Jenkintown station in the Philadelphia suburbs in September 1967, and immediately began testing on the Reading Company's West Trenton Line. After multiple failures of the control and propulsion systems at just 70 mph (110 km/h), PRR executives pushed for the beginning of service to be delayed. On September 20, the start of service was postponed to January 1, 1968. The first two cars began testing on the PRR's main line on November 18, soon reaching speeds up to 125 mph (201 km/h). The cars reached 164 mph (264 km/h) near Princeton Junction in New Jersey six days later, but the testing also indicated that the cars would not be able to operate anywhere near that speed in revenue service. On December 17, 1967, tests of Metroliners passing older MP54 railcars caused windows to be ripped out of the MP54s due to the pressure drop, indicating that the high-speed rolling stock might not mix well with legacy equipment.

On February 1, 1968, the PRR merged with New York Central Railroad to become Penn Central. The remainder of the cars were delivered with Penn Central logos, but retained the PRR-specified livery of gray paint with red pinstripes. On March 2, the first GE-powered Metroliners arrived for testing. The pantographs on the Westinghouse-powered cars would bounce on the aging catenary wires, then draw high currents due to improperly designed transformers. The GE-powered cars proved to have a superior pantograph design, but were still not fit for service. On March 12, entry into revenue service was delayed indefinitely. Testing was suspended entirely between June 24 and mid-July; tests with 6-car trains in July had severe issues with electrical arcing. The first combined test train of GE and Westinghouse cars ran on August 8.

In June 1968, an agreement was reached where the state Transportation Assistance Authority would pay $2 million and Penn Central would pay $2.5 million for the 11 Metroliners for Harrisburg service. On July 14, a 4-car train was tested on the line, with several demonstration runs for officials on August 21. In early October, several test trains proved the viability of the planned sub-3-hour schedules. Substation modifications later that month and a legal settlement between Budd and Penn Central in November paved the way for service to begin. On December 20, Penn Central announced that Metroliner service would begin on January 16, 1969.

=== Early service ===
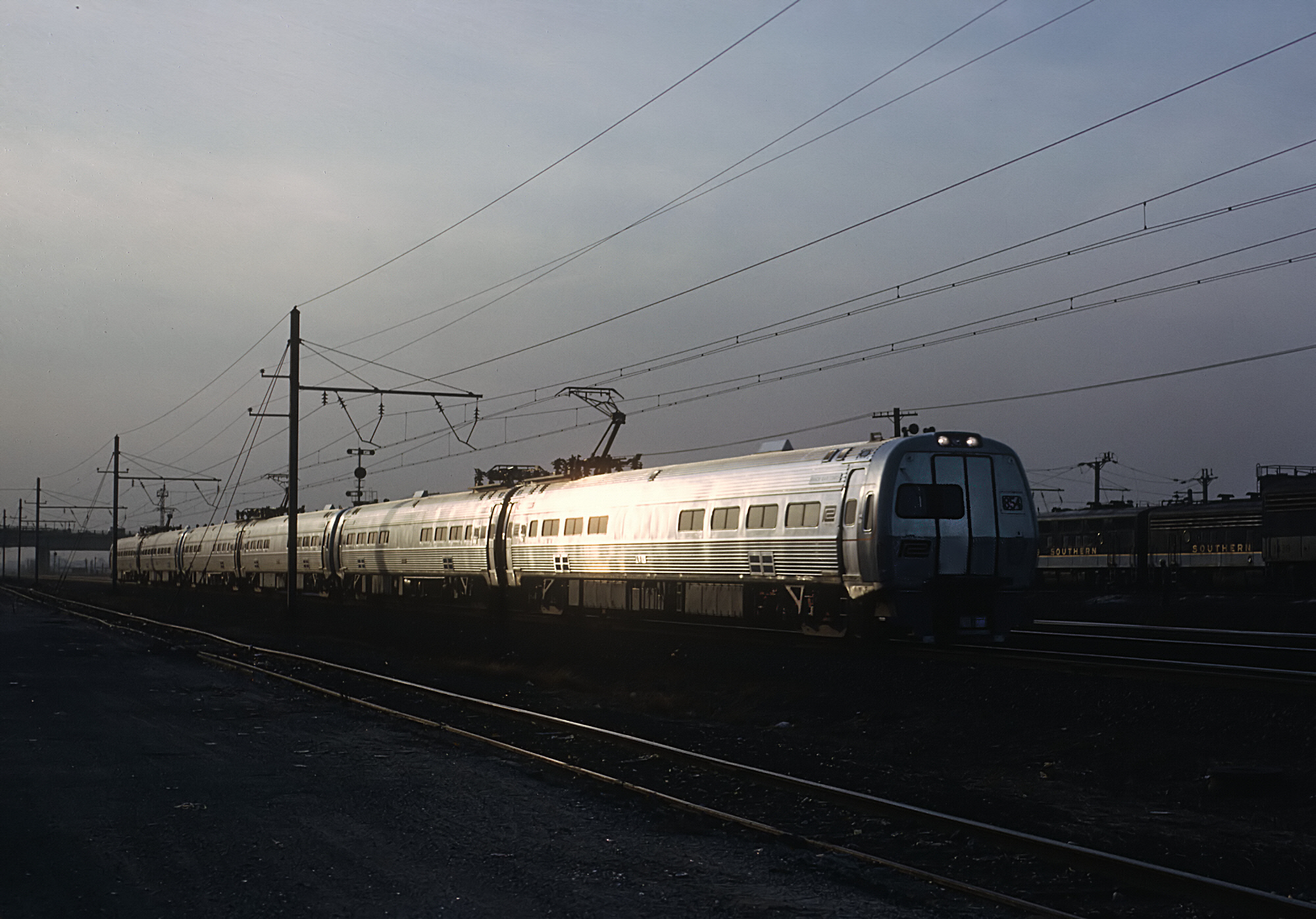
The first revenue Metroliner trip near Washington Union Station on January 16, 1969

A Washington–New York round trip for VIPs was operated on January 15, 1969. Metroliner service finally started on January 16, 1969, with a single daily round trip leaving New York in the morning and Washington in the afternoon. Echoing problems encountered during testing, several early trains sucked windows off passing trains of MP54 cars. An eight-car train was tested on February 5, but it caused numerous circuit breaker trips and catenary outages, indicating that six cars was the practical limit on train length. Testing on the electrified mainline to New Haven, Connecticut, took place with some difficulties in February. The Westinghouse cars continued to lag behind the GE-powered cars; the former were first tested at 160 mph (260 km/h) with serious issues in February, and did not enter service until midyear.

Service was gradually increased, including a non-stop round trip on a 2.5 hour schedule, which was added April 2, 1969. However, problems with the cars persisted; maximum speeds temporarily dropped from 120 mph (190 km/h) to 110 mph (180 km/h) soon after. Due to the condition of the track and signal system, the Federal Railroad Administration never allowed Metroliners to go faster than 120 mph (190 km/h) between Washington and New York. Still, they were the fastest trains in North America and provided speed, comfort and amenities that could compete with the airlines. Two years into the service, half of Metroliner passengers had switched from other modes, and 70% were men on business trips.

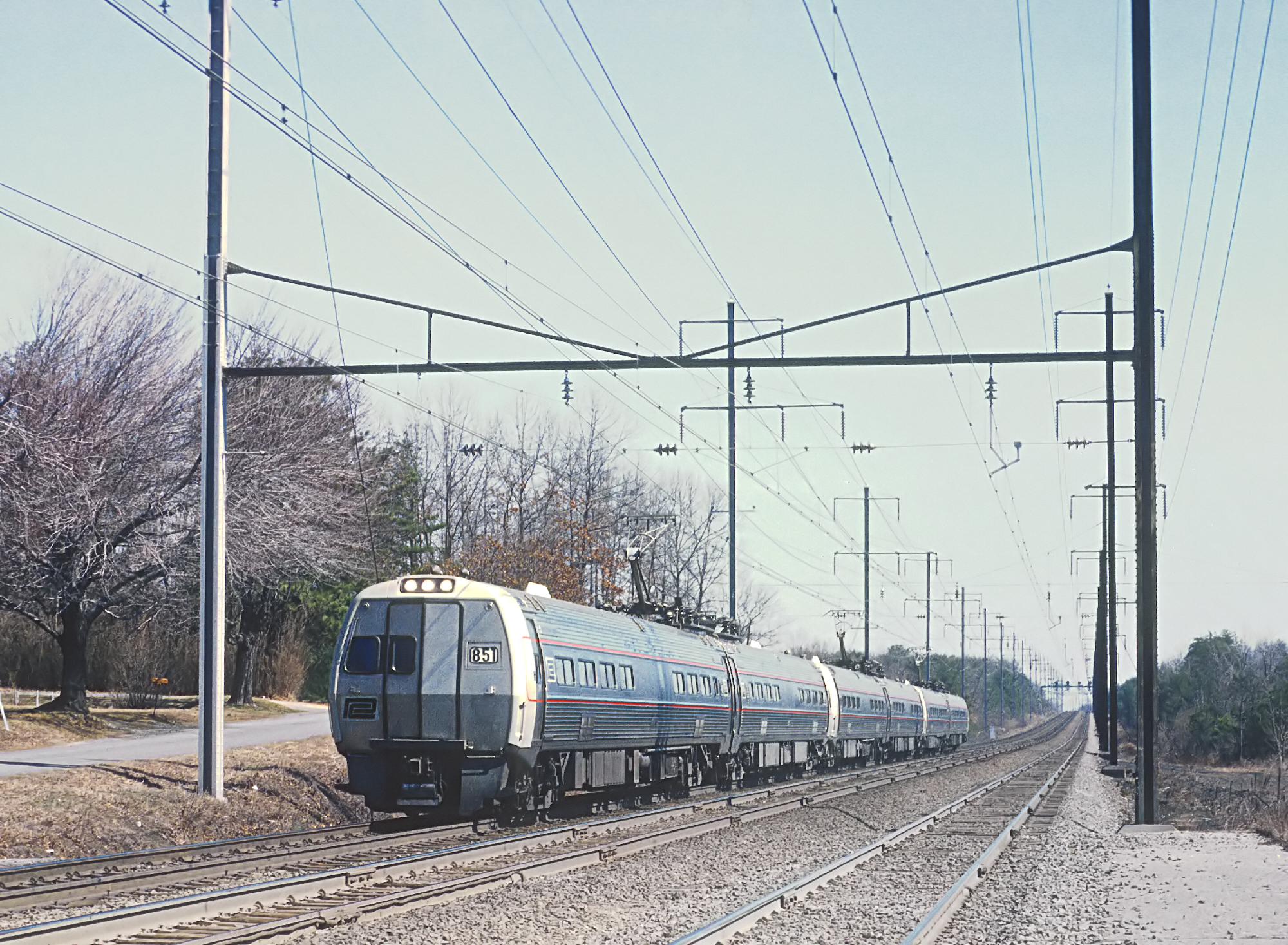
A Metroliner train in March 1969, two months into service

On February 25, 1970, the 11 Westinghouse-powered cars intended for Harrisburg service completed their performance testing. Penn Central refused to accept the cars, citing numerous technical issues with the cars and their general unsuitability for the service. They had worse acceleration than the Silverliners already in service, tended to overheat when making numerous closely spaced stops, and had difficulty climbing the grade out of Suburban Station. Additionally, the corridor lacked high-level platforms to effectively use the cars, and 15 substations would require expensive modifications. The 11 cars were unused for some time before Penn Central ultimately decided to lease the cars for use on the core New York–Washington service. They were moved back to the Budd plant for modifications in April. In July, the state authorized $100,000 to upgrade Silverliners for the Harrisburg service instead.

By March 1970, even as cars continued to be accepted, the DOT began considering modifying two cars under a test program. The DOT and Penn Central began holding meetings in May, deciding to modify one car of each propulsion type at first, followed by four additional cars. Out-of-service rates reached 40% and higher; In June, Senator Clifford Case of New Jersey began pushing the DOT to devote $5 million to the rebuild program to increase reliability. The official two-year demonstration program began on October 1. In December, a feasibility study of upgrading the cars for higher sustained speeds was initiated. By February 1971, top speed had been reduced further to 100 mph (160 km/h).

=== Amtrak service ===
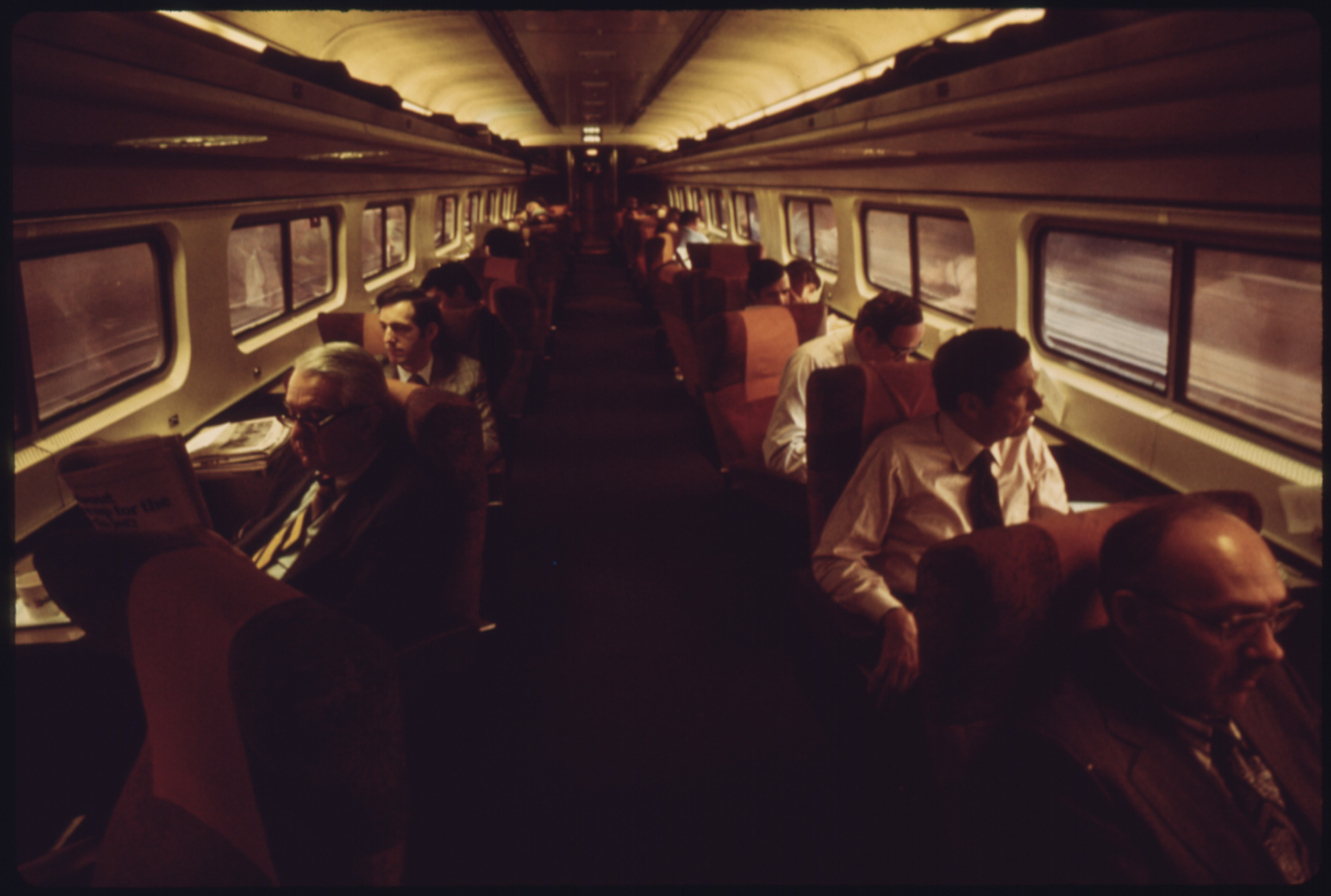
The interior of a first class configuration Metroliner car in revenue service with Amtrak.

On May 1, 1971, the newly formed Amtrak took over intercity passenger rail services from Penn Central and the other private railroads. Penn Central's 49 Metroliners remained in service, with Amtrak reimbursing Penn Central's lease payments. The DOT contracted with GE and Westinghouse in June for a R&D project of further electrical modifications, with detailed plans made in July. On September 8, 1971, Amtrak leased the remaining 12 Metroliners from Budd. With most cars available for use, Amtrak increased frequencies on the profitable Metroliner service. Service reached 12 daily round trips that November, including service to New Haven, but a permanent 100 mph (160 km/h) speed restriction was also enacted.

In early 1972, Amtrak considered converting the Metroliners to locomotive-hauled operation; however, with the cars the only new rolling stock in Amtrak's possession, it was decided to continue efforts to increase their operating reliability instead. In February, one GE-powered car was shipped to Erie, Pennsylvania, for the DOT-funded rebuild program, with hopes to modify all cars by 1976. It was followed by a Westinghouse-powered car in March. In late April, Amtrak accepted six of the leased cars for revenue service, which permitted an increase to 14 round trips on May 1. An additional pair of cars were sent for rebuild later in the year.

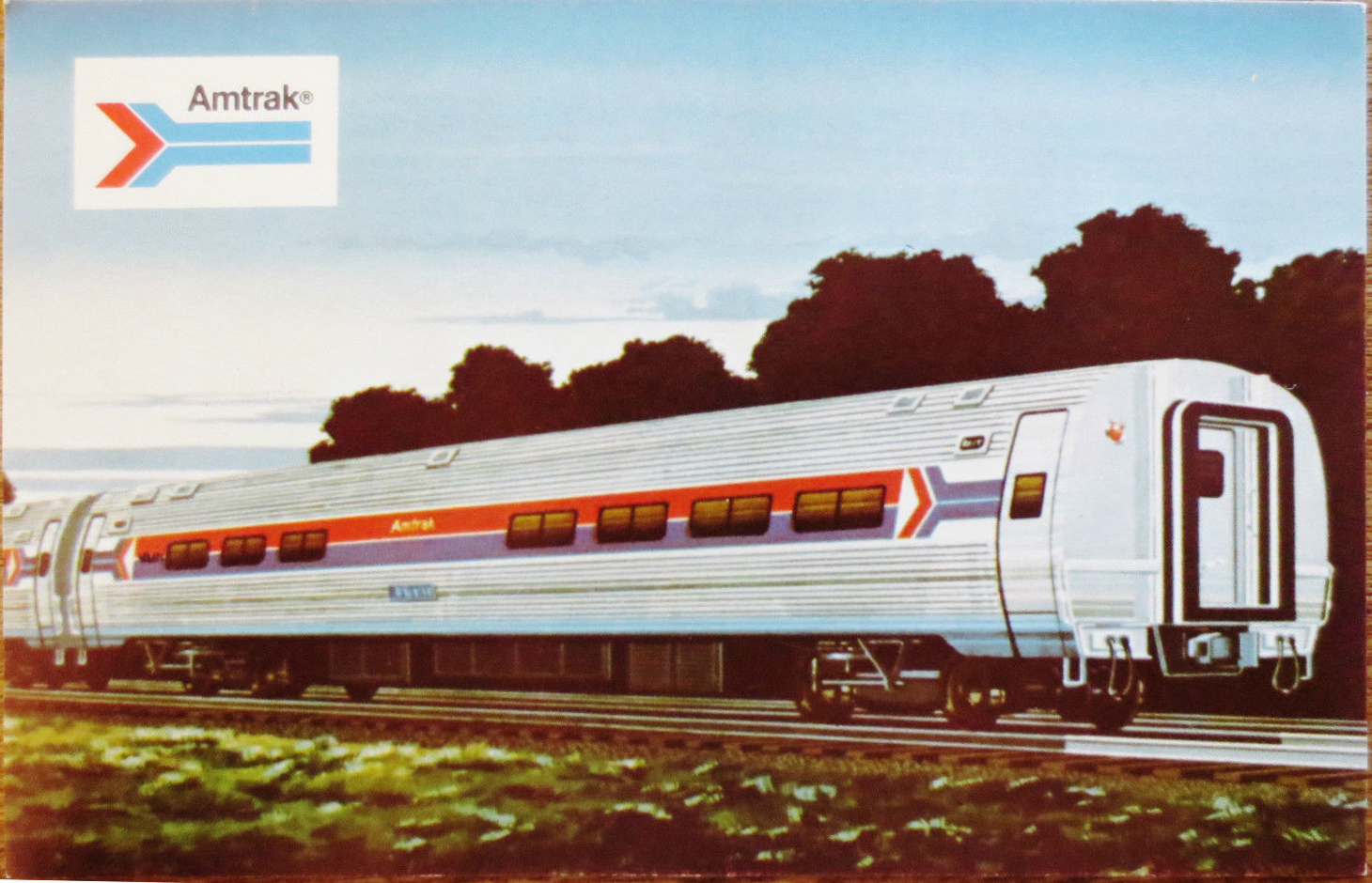
Mid-1970s postcard for the then-new Amfleet coaches, which were heavily based on the Metroliner design

In October 1973, Amtrak placed an order for 57 Amfleet coaches, the first of what would ultimately be a fleet of over 600. Although the Metroliner propulsion systems had proved unsuccessful, the carbodies were well-liked, and the Amfleet cars had the same basic structure. By November, the first two rebuilt cars had been completed and were waiting for legal agreements to enter testing. The dynamic braking resistors and the air intakes were relocated to a streamlined bump on the roof, reducing overheating and snow ingestion issues that had occurred when they were mounted under the carbody. The rebuilt cars had a maximum speed of 130 mph (210 km/h). Two additional cars were completed by February 1974. All four rebuilt cars were tested at up to 150 mph (240 km/h) in May and returned to revenue service as a four-car set on July 1. The rebuilding was largely successful except for continued issues with rough-riding trucks, but it cost $500k per car, more than the original cost of $450k each.

Later in the year, Amtrak began an accelerated repair program on the unmodified cars, which had logged over 11,000,000 miles (18,000,000 km) in revenue service, but very few cars were actually repaired. By the end of 1975, out-of-service rate was still 27.5%, and many trains ran with fewer cars than demand called for. In February 1976, Amtrak cut Metroliner service from 15 to 13 round trips because of the lack of serviceable cars. Penn Central's leasehold interest in its 49 Metroliners passed to Conrail on April 1, 1976, but would soon be taken over by Amtrak. In August, Budd unveiled the SPV-2000, a Rail Diesel Car successor built with the Metroliner shell design. Although heavily marketed, the SPV-2000s were extremely unreliable and never achieved the widespread use of the Metroliners and Amfleets.

=== Rebuilding and replacement ===
In 1976, Amtrak began seeking new electric locomotives to replace its aging GG1 fleet and speed-restricted E60 fleet. That October, a Swedish AW1Rc4 locomotive pulling Amfleets took over one Metroliner round trip, the first time that a locomotive-hauled train could match a Metroliner schedule. That year, Amtrak contemplated ordering an additional 118 Metroliners, dubbed Metroliner II. This projected order was later cut back to 50 cars and finally cancelled altogether. Over 1976, on-time performance halved from 81% to 46%. In November, consultant Louis T. Klauder & Associates issued a report showing that the rebuilt cars had half the maintenance cost of the original cars and recommended an aggressive overhaul program.

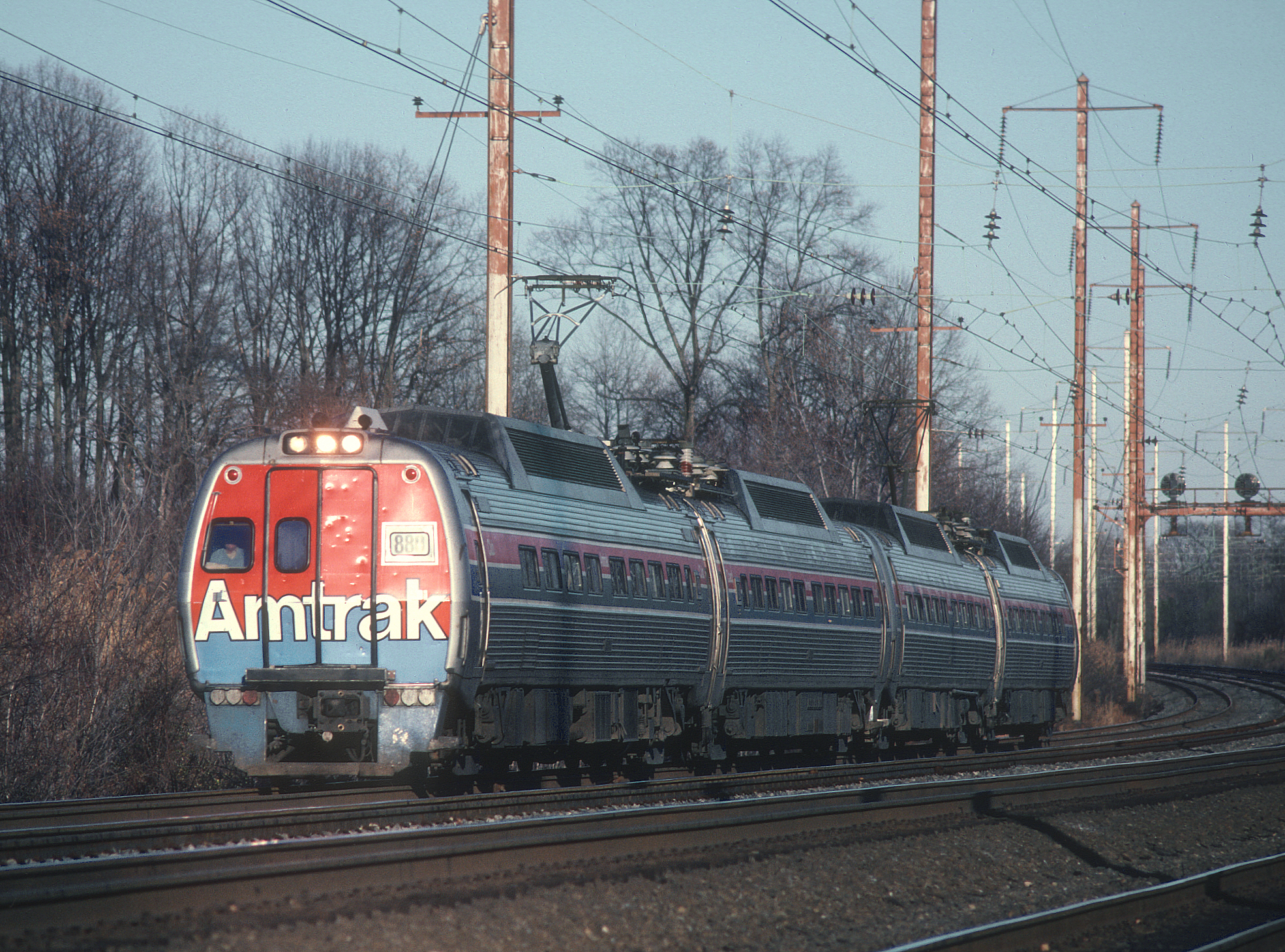
Rebuilt Metroliners in service in 1980

On February 6, 1977, Amtrak announced plans to spend $24.4 million to overhaul all 61 cars as part of a larger fleet renewal program. In early 1977, some cars were repainted in Amtrak's Phase I paint scheme with red, white and blue ends and a small Amtrak logo. On September 28, the Amtrak board approved a more limited overhaul program of 16 Metroliners, as well as the purchase of the first 8 AEM-7 electric locomotives. On November 7, Amtrak released a specification for overhauling the 57 unmodified cars. It awarded a $20 million overhaul contract to GE that month.

In January 1978, the New York Times reported that Amfleet-based trains with conventional locomotives had better on-time performance than the Metroliners. In March, as Metroliner cars were shipped to GE for overhaul, a GG1/Amfleet set took over one round trip on a slower schedule. Eight GG1s were regeared for 110 mph (180 km/h) to better meet Metroliner schedules, with the higher top speed balancing the locomotives' lower acceleration. On April 30, 1978, schedules were lengthened to 3 hours 20 minutes as more Amfleet-based trains were used, and the name was modified to Metroliner Service to reflect the changing equipment. Three round trips used Amfleets by May 29, with a 3:25 scheduled running time.

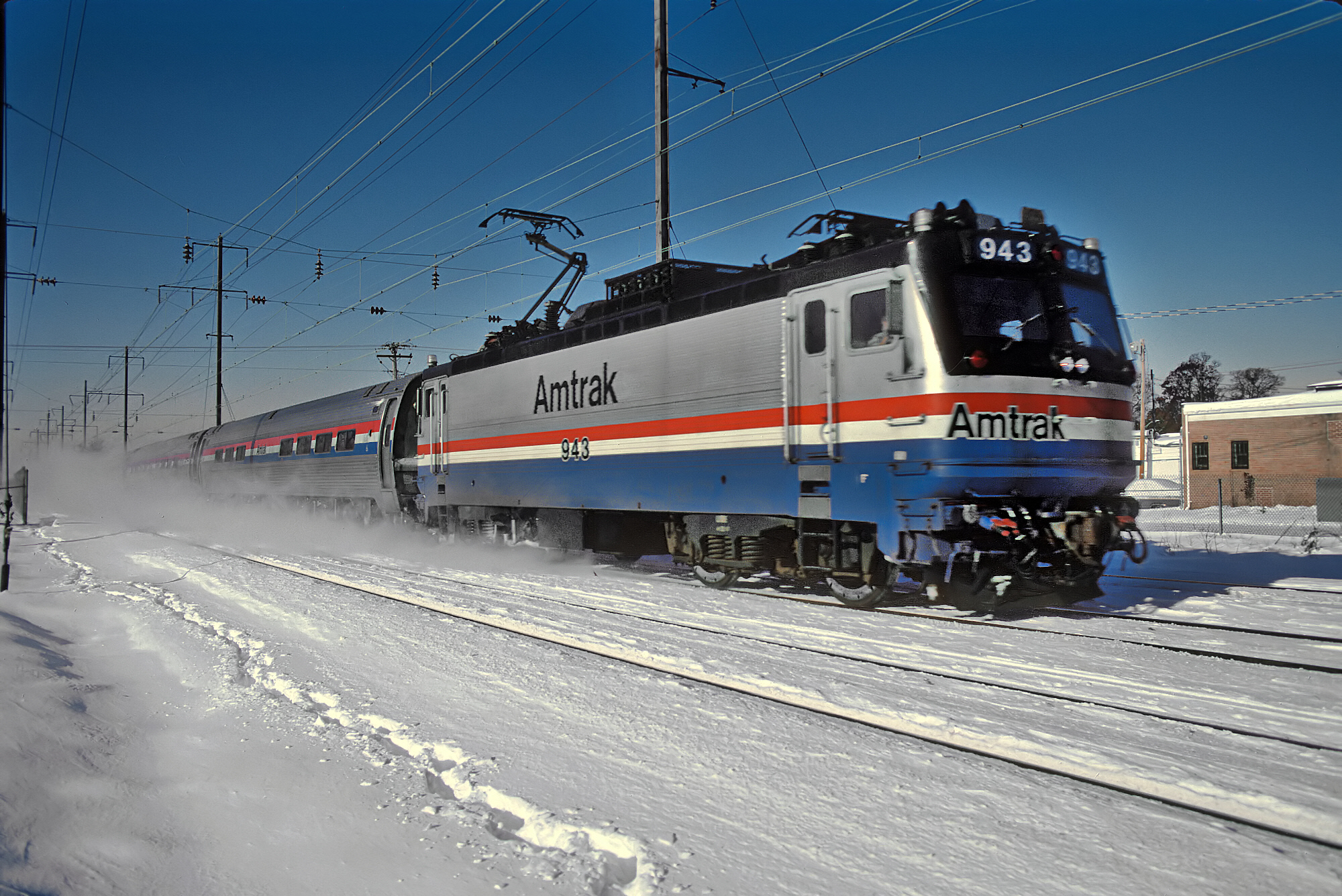
Metroliners were gradually replaced in Metroliner Service by AEM-7s pulling Amfleet consists

The first rebuilt cars entered service on May 17, 1979. By July, the rebuilt cars operated three round trips, with four by unmodified cars and 4 with Amfleet equipment. 37 Metroliners had been overhauled by November 15, but rebuilding plans were cancelled for the remaining 24. By January 1980, rebuilds covered 6 of 14 daily round trips. Some of these later rebuilt cars received the Phase II scheme, a red and blue front end with a large Amtrak logo across the full width. The first AEM-7 locomotives entered service in mid-1980; capable of 125 mph (201 km/h) with Amfleet equipment, they could readily match Metroliner Service schedules. Three were in Metroliner Service use by August 11, with an increase from 12 to 14 round trips in October. The increasingly unreliable Metroliners were slowly withdrawn as more AEM-7s arrived; the newer locomotives could take advantage of recent track upgrades that the Metroliners could not.

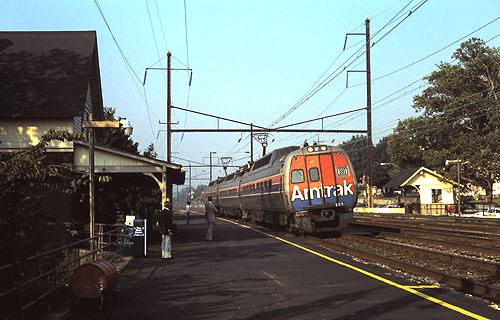
A Keystone Service train of Metroliners in 1985. Unlike in Metroliner Service, Metroliners on the Keystone Service were sometimes used in sets of odd numbers of cars.

When Amtrak began returning rented Jersey Arrows to New Jersey Transit in late 1980, other equipment was needed to cover Silverliner Service trains on the Harrisburg corridor. Test runs of Metroliners on the corridor began in January 1981, and revenue service began in February, despite warnings a decade before that the cars were not suitable for the service. The last non-rebuilt Metroliners in regular use on Metroliner Service trains were removed on April 1, 1981, followed by the GG1s in May. The last Metroliner Service trains using Metroliners ran on October 23, 1981. With all Metroliner Service trains covered by AEM-7/Amfleet sets, all Keystone Service trains to Harrisburg then used Metroliners, rebranded as Capitoliners.

However, by the mid-1980s, reliability had become such a problem (even on the slower Harrisburg corridor) that trains of Metroliners were often towed by locomotives. Amtrak terminated the lease on the 49 ex-Penn Central cars in late 1985, purchasing them outright. On January 25, 1988, Amtrak began towing all Metroliner cars on the Keystone Service with AEM-7 locomotives rather than running them under their own power, although the cars had their pantographs up to power lighting and heating systems. A wreck of the Washington–Boston Night Owl four days later in Chester, Pennsylvania took two AEM-7 locomotives out of commission, exacerbating a shortage of electric motive power available to Amtrak. On February 1, Amtrak converted all Keystone Service trains to diesel power and terminated them on the lower level of 30th Street Station in Philadelphia, as diesel-powered trains were not allowed in the tunnels to Suburban Station. The Metroliners continued to be used as coaches for several years before being replaced by Amfleet cars.

== Conversions and disposition ==
Ex-Metroliner cab cars
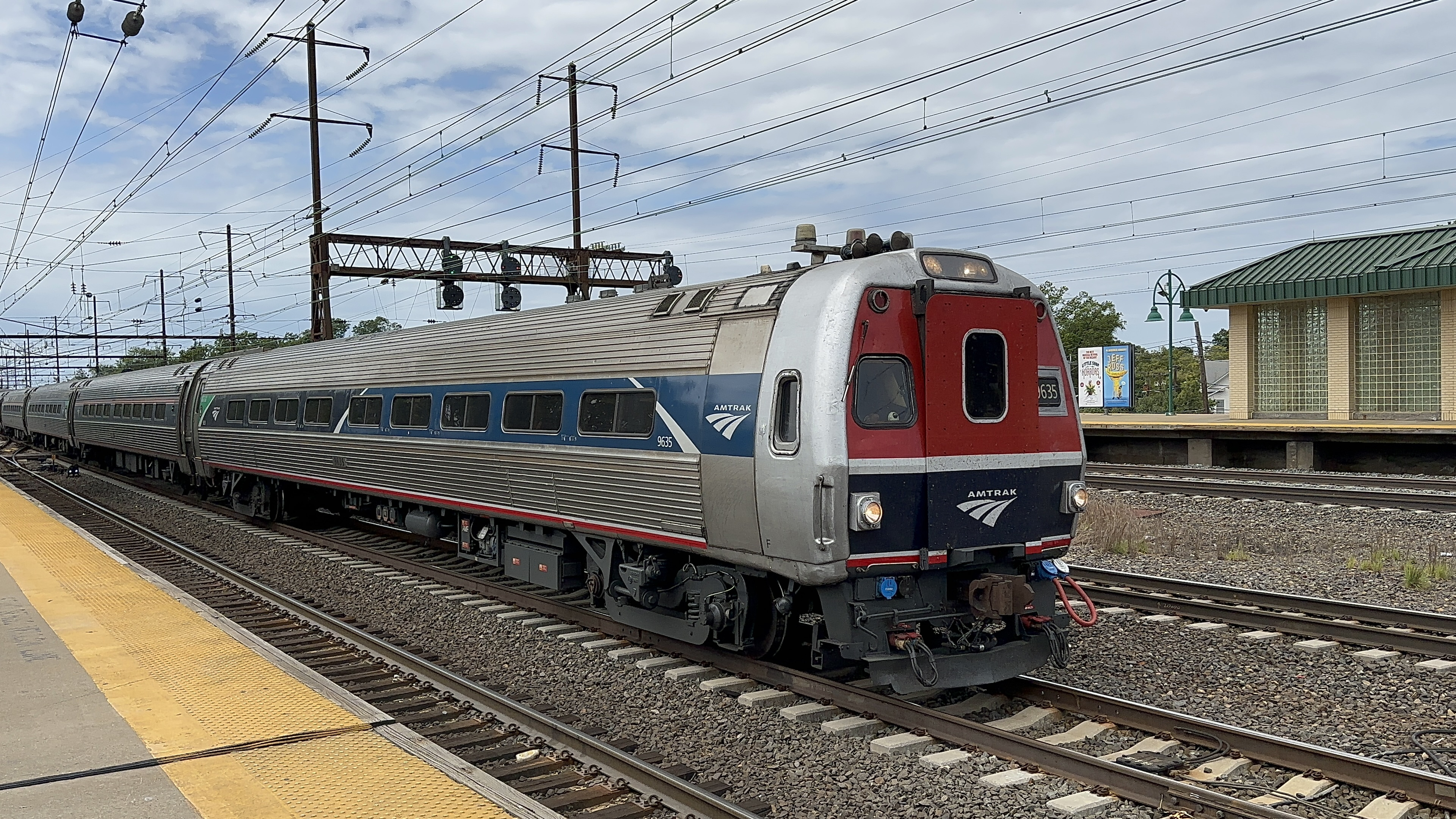
- ex-Metroliner cab car 9635 (formerly 810) leading a Keystone Service train at Rahway station in August 2025
- Entered service: 1988
- Refurbished: 1987–1988
- Number built: 29
- Fleet numbers: 9630–9652, 9709, 9822, 9825–9828
- Operator: Amtrak
- Line served: Various regional services

Specifications
- Maximum speed: 125 mph (201 km/h)

=== Conversion to cab cars ===
In the late 1980s Amtrak found itself with a supply of surplus Metroliner cars with problematic propulsion systems, but with sound body and frame, stored at their Wilmington and Bear shop complexes in Delaware. The coaches were, except for the propulsion systems, a near-identical match to Amfleet coaches. Twenty-nine of the 31 coaches were renumbered and used as cab control cars for corridor services. This allowed trains to operate in push-pull service, rather than needing to be turned around on a wye at terminals or to have a locomotive on each end.

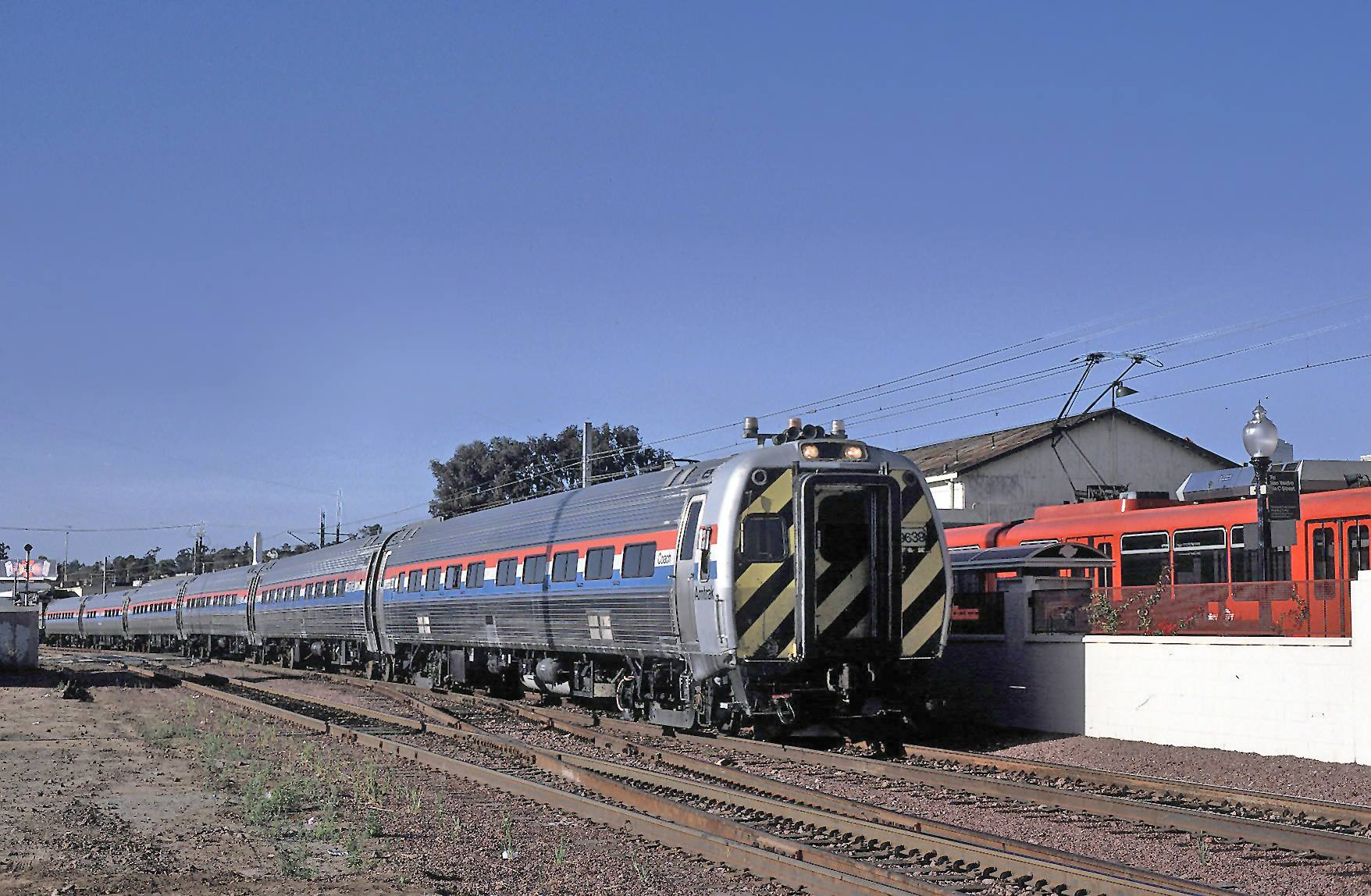
Ex-Metroliner cab car 9638 (formerly 812) leading a San Diegan train in April 1993

The first 23 cab car conversions, which included full removal of the propulsion gear and roof hump, took place around 1988. Ten (9630–9639) were designated for West Coast routes including the San Diegan, six (9640–9645) for the Atlantic City Express, and seven (9646–9652) for Chicago-based regional services. Coach No. 809 was pressed into cab car service with minimal modifications, making 24 active cab cars by 1990. Five more – Nos. 822 and 825–828 – soon followed. When the P40DC locomotives were produced with 800-series numbering in the early 1990s, the later cab cars were renumbered 9709, 9822, and 9825–9828.

The discontinuance of the Atlantic City Express in 1995, and the arrival of the California Cars in 1996 and the Surfliner railcars in 2000–2002, lessened the need for the Metroliner-based cab cars. However, the Vermonter corridor service began using them when a reverse move was added between Springfield, Massachusetts and Palmer, Massachusetts in 1995. The later cab cars, and some of the earlier conversions, were retired in the 1990s and early 2000s. In 2007, six of the 9600-series cab cars were brought out of retirement to support additional frequencies on the newly re-electrified Keystone Service. After the Vermonter's backup move was eliminated in 2014, the ex-Metroliner cab cars have been used primarily on the Keystone Service, Valley Flyer and Amtrak Hartford Line.

The 470 Amfleet I cars and ex-Metroliner cab cars are expected to be replaced by Siemens Venture based Airo trainsets beginning in 2025.

=== Other conversions ===
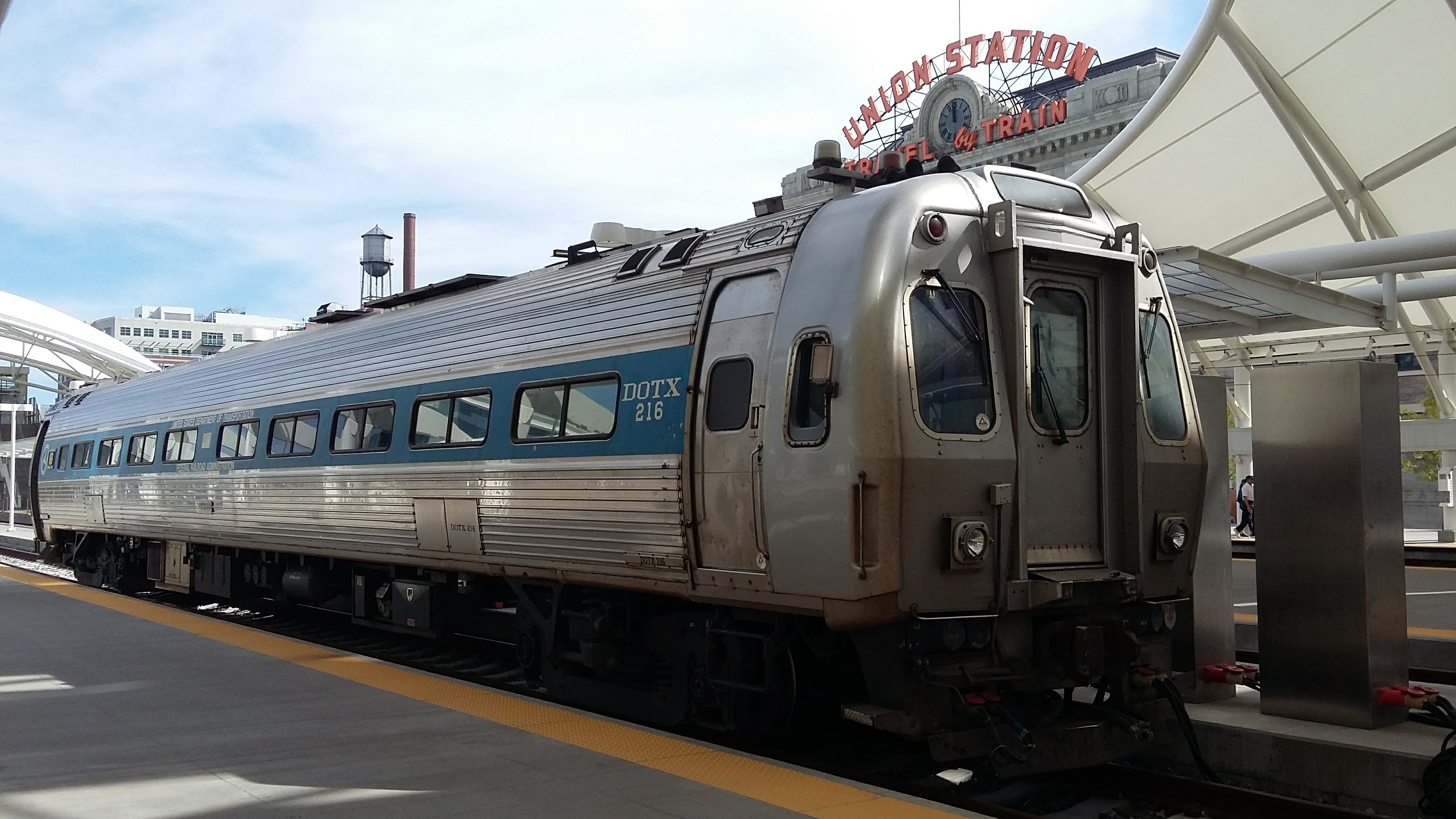
Ex-Metroliner T-16 testing new RTD lines in Denver in 2016

Ten Metroliners – eight parlor cars and the two coaches not used as cab cars – were used as unpowered coaches to supplement the Amfleets and Horizons on Michigan Corridor and other Chicago-based Midwest routes, funded by the State of Michigan as "Michigan Coaches". Eight were renumbered 44550–44557; 886 and 887 were not renumbered. One of the coaches, No. 44553 (ex-No. 884) was rebuilt in 2013 as Amtrak catenary measurement car No. 10005.

Metroliner car No. 803 served as cab car No. 9642 from 1988 to 1996. In June 1999, the Federal Railroad Administration obtained the car from Amtrak. After a yearlong refurbishment, it entered service in November 2000 as T-16 (DOTX 216), a research and track geometry car capable of measurements at up to 160 mph (260 km/h). It is used to measure track conditions on the Northeast Corridor for the Boston-Washington Acela Express service. Cab car No. 9652, formerly No. 821, was leased to Bombardier in August 2000. Converted to test car DOTX 220, it was used during testing of the JetTrain, an experimental high-speed trainset, at Transportation Technology Center. After the lease expired in 2003, it was returned to Amtrak, then later returned to TTCI as DOTX 222.

Snack bar car No. 863 was converted by Amtrak to No. 9800, which is used as a business car or conference car for special events and charter trains. It is sometimes used as a crew lounge for special trains.

=== Disposition ===
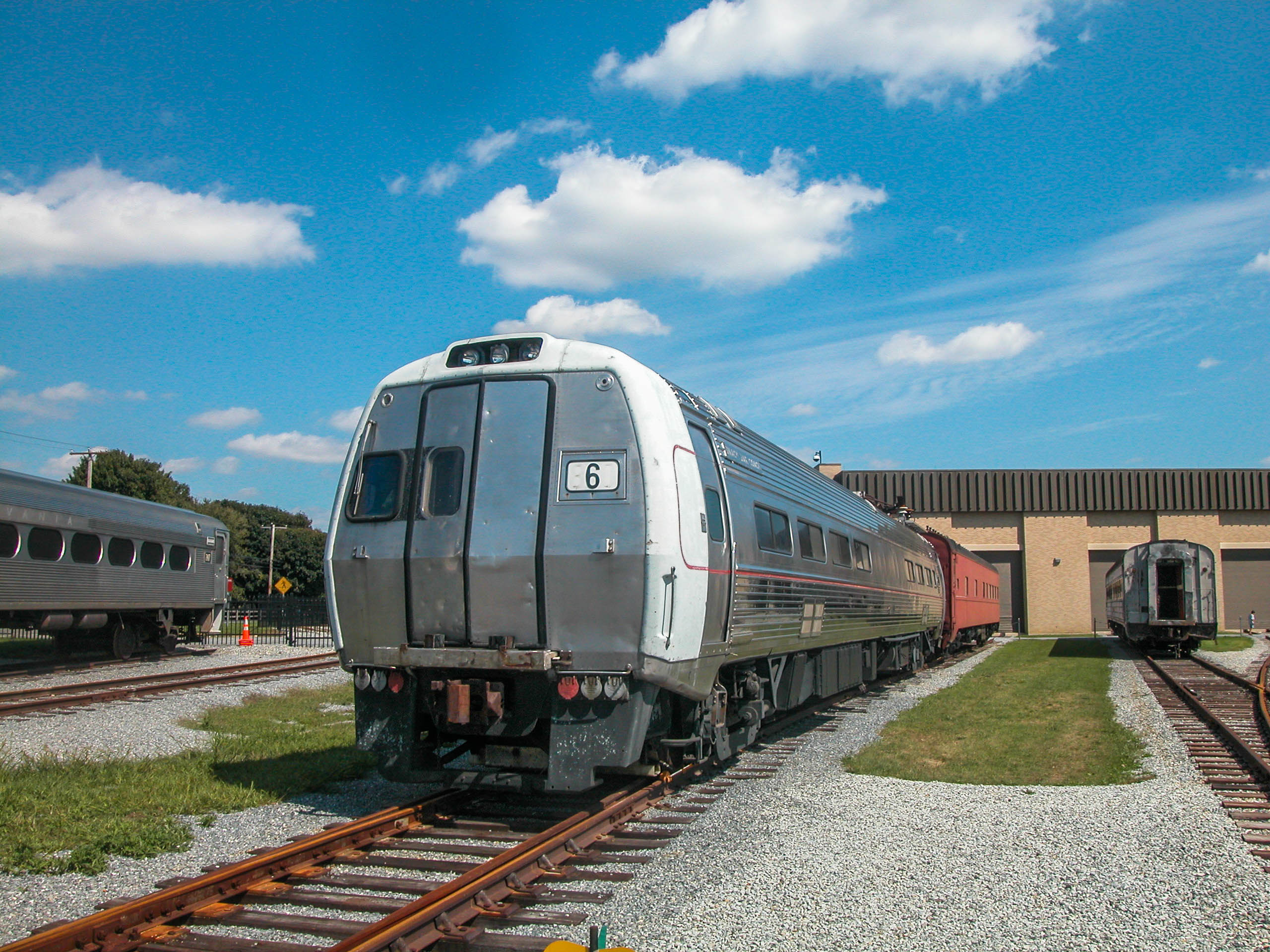
Metroliner snack bar car No. 860, the only Metroliner preserved in original condition, at the Railroad Museum of Pennsylvania

Except for the 9600-series cab cars and the four cars modified for other uses, most of the former Metroliners were scrapped in Delaware between 2003 and 2011. One Metroliner snack bar car, No. 860, is preserved at the Railroad Museum of Pennsylvania in its original paint scheme and interior.
