= List of railroads eligible to participate in the formation of Amtrak =

On May 1, 1971, there were 26 railroads in the United States that were eligible to participate in the formation of Amtrak. Twenty chose to join Amtrak in 1971, and one more eventually joined in 1979. Of the remaining five, four ultimately discontinued their services, while one was taken over by a state agency.

== Participating railroads ==
Twenty railroads opted to participate. Each contributed rolling stock, equipment, and financial capital to the new government-sponsored entity. In return, the railroads received the right to discontinue intercity passenger rail services; most received tax breaks, while some received common stock in Amtrak. The four railroads that accepted stock were the Burlington Northern Railroad, the Grand Trunk Western Railroad, the Chicago, Milwaukee, St. Paul and Pacific Railroad ("Milwaukee Road"), and Penn Central. Because Amtrak discontinued many passenger rail routes when it commenced operations, some of the participating railroads did not host successor passenger rail service. The twenty participating railroads were:

- Atchison, Topeka and Santa Fe Railway
- Baltimore and Ohio Railroad (hosted no Amtrak service until the West Virginian later in 1971)
  - Retained operations of commuter service from Washington–Baltimore, Washington–Martinsburg, and Pittsburgh–Versailles
- Burlington Northern Railroad
  - Retained operations of commuter service from Chicago–Aurora
- Central of Georgia Railway (never hosted Amtrak)
- Chesapeake and Ohio Railway
- Chicago, Milwaukee, St. Paul and Pacific Railroad
  - Retained operations of commuter service from Milwaukee–Watertown, Chicago–Elgin, and Chicago–Walworth
- Chicago and North Western Railway (never hosted Amtrak)
  - Retained operations of commuter service from Chicago–Geneva, Chicago–Harvard/Lake Geneva, and Chicago–Kenosha
- Delaware and Hudson Railway (hosted no Amtrak service until the Adirondack in 1974)
- Grand Trunk Western Railroad (hosted no Amtrak service until the Blue Water Limited in 1974)
- Gulf, Mobile and Ohio Railroad
  - Retained operations of commuter service from Chicago–Joliet
- Illinois Central Railroad
  - Retained commuter service on their electric district
- Louisville and Nashville Railroad
- Missouri Pacific Railroad
- Norfolk and Western Railway (hosted no Amtrak service until the Mountaineer in 1975)
  - Retained operation of the Orland Park Cannonball
- Northwestern Pacific Railroad (never hosted Amtrak service)
- Penn Central Transportation (whose Northeast Corridor Amtrak acquired the majority of in 1976)
  - Retained operations of extensive commuter networks from Boston South Station, Philadelphia Suburban Station, Grand Central Terminal, and West out of New York Penn Station, as well as from Princeton Junction–Princeton, Chicago–Valparaiso, Detroit–Ann Arbor, DC–Baltimore, and Providence–Westerly
- Richmond, Fredericksburg and Potomac Railroad
- Seaboard Coast Line Railroad
- Southern Pacific Railroad
  - Retained operation of the Peninsula Commute
- Union Pacific Railroad

== Non-participating railroads ==
There were six railroads eligible to participate in the formation of Amtrak that declined to spin off their passenger rail services. The intercity passenger operations of those six railroads eventually were absorbed by Amtrak or another governmental entity, or discontinued. The six non-participating railroads and disposition of their routes were as follows:

- The Chicago, Rock Island and Pacific Railroad continued to receive subsidies from the state of Illinois. It discontinued its two remaining intercity passenger trains, the Peoria Rocket and Quad Cities Rocket, on December 31, 1978.
- The Chicago South Shore and South Bend Railroad considered its commuter-oriented service outside of Amtrak's scope. Local public funding for its trains began in 1977, with the Northern Indiana Commuter Transportation District fully taking over the South Shore Line in 1989.
- The Denver and Rio Grande Western Railroad feared congestion from hosting a revived California Zephyr on its single-track mainline. It operated its last Rio Grande Zephyr in 1983, and Amtrak's San Francisco Zephyr was renamed the California Zephyr.
- The Georgia Railroad received tax benefits from the state of Georgia so long as it ran mixed trains. The Seaboard System Railroad, its successor, discontinued the last mixed train on May 6, 1983.
- The Reading Company determined that its Philadelphia–Newark service was outside Amtrak's scope. It was later operated by Conrail and NJ Transit, who discontinued it in 1982.
- The Southern Railway did not join until February 1, 1979, at which point it conveyed its Southern Crescent to Amtrak.

== Ineligible railroads ==
A few major railroads with operations in the United States were not eligible to participate in the formation of Amtrak:

- The Alaska Railroad provided long-distance service, but was already owned by the United States government.
- Auto ferry service was specifically excluded from Amtrak's original remit. This was in reference to a service proposed by the Office of High-Speed Ground Transportation, rather than the private Auto-Train Corporation. The latter operated from late 1971 to 1981; Amtrak revived the service as the Auto Train in 1983.
- The Canadian Pacific's Atlantic, though it crossed northern Maine, was considered a Canada-centric service not relevant to Amtrak. It was taken over by Via Rail in 1978 and ran until 1994. Until 1977, a Canadian National Railway Winnipeg–Thunder Bay local service also crossed part of northern Minnesota.
- The Erie Lackawanna's Hoboken-Port Jervis service was considered an ineligible commuter service; in 1973, the Metropolitan Transportation Authority began subsidizing continued operation. The company's last intercity service, the Lake Cities, had been discontinued in 1970.
- The Florida East Coast discontinued its last passenger service in 1968, leaving the FEC ineligible to join Amtrak. Passenger services resumed under the purview of privately owned Brightline in 2018.
- The Kansas City Southern Railway, having discontinued its Southern Belle in 1969, had no remaining passenger service despite its size.
- The Soo Line Railroad was permitted to discontinue regular passenger services in the 1960s in exchange for allowing passengers to ride in cabooses on freights between Sault Ste. Marie, Michigan, Rhinelander, Wisconsin, and Neenah, Wisconsin. The mixed trains lasted until 1986, making the Soo Line the last Class I railroad in the continental United States with non-subsidized passenger service.
- The Western Pacific Railroad discontinued the California Zephyr in 1970, ending passenger service on its route. It refused to discuss resumption of service with Amtrak.
