= Amfleet =

Class of American passenger railroad cars

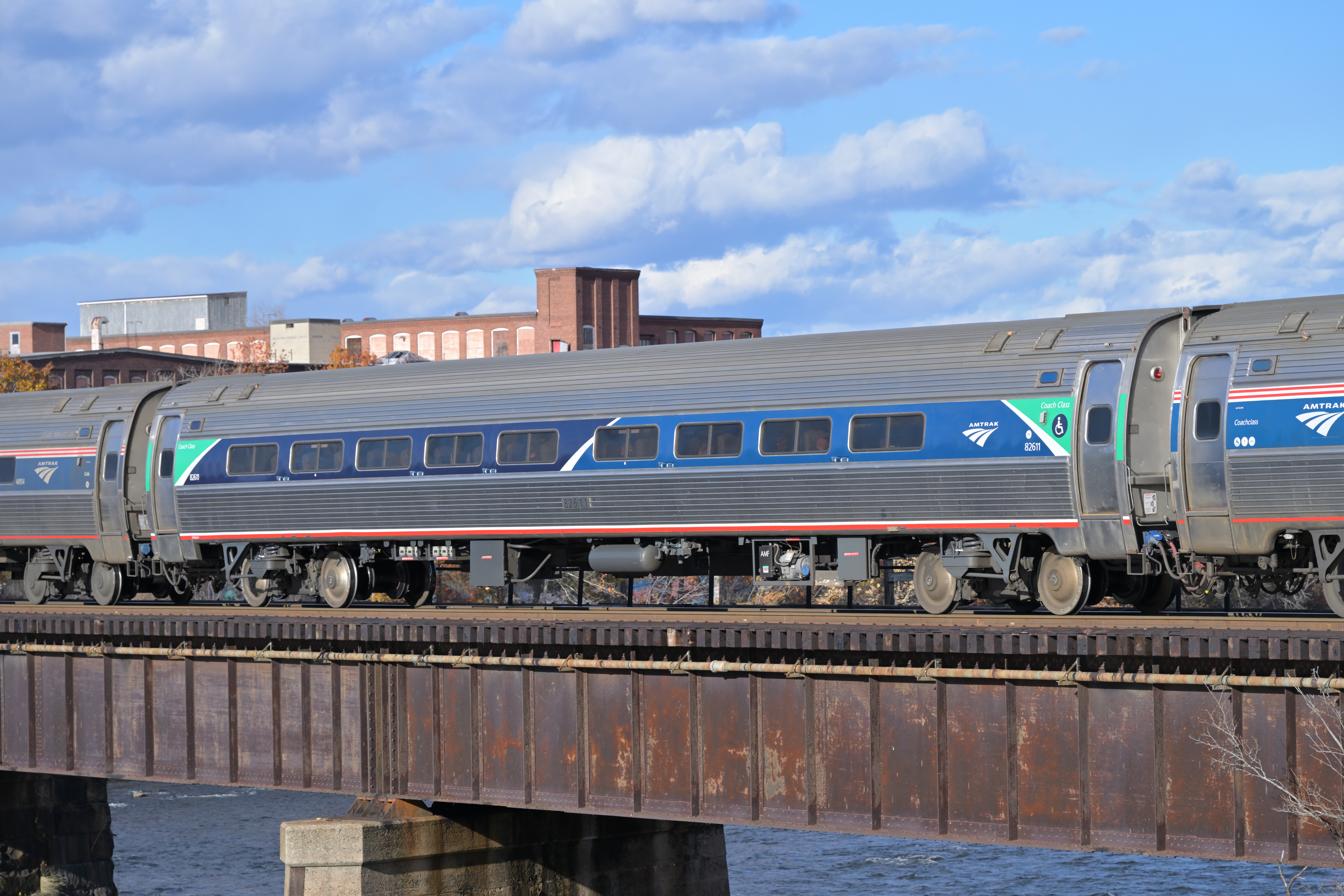
- Amfleet I coach class car on a Vermonter train in 2025

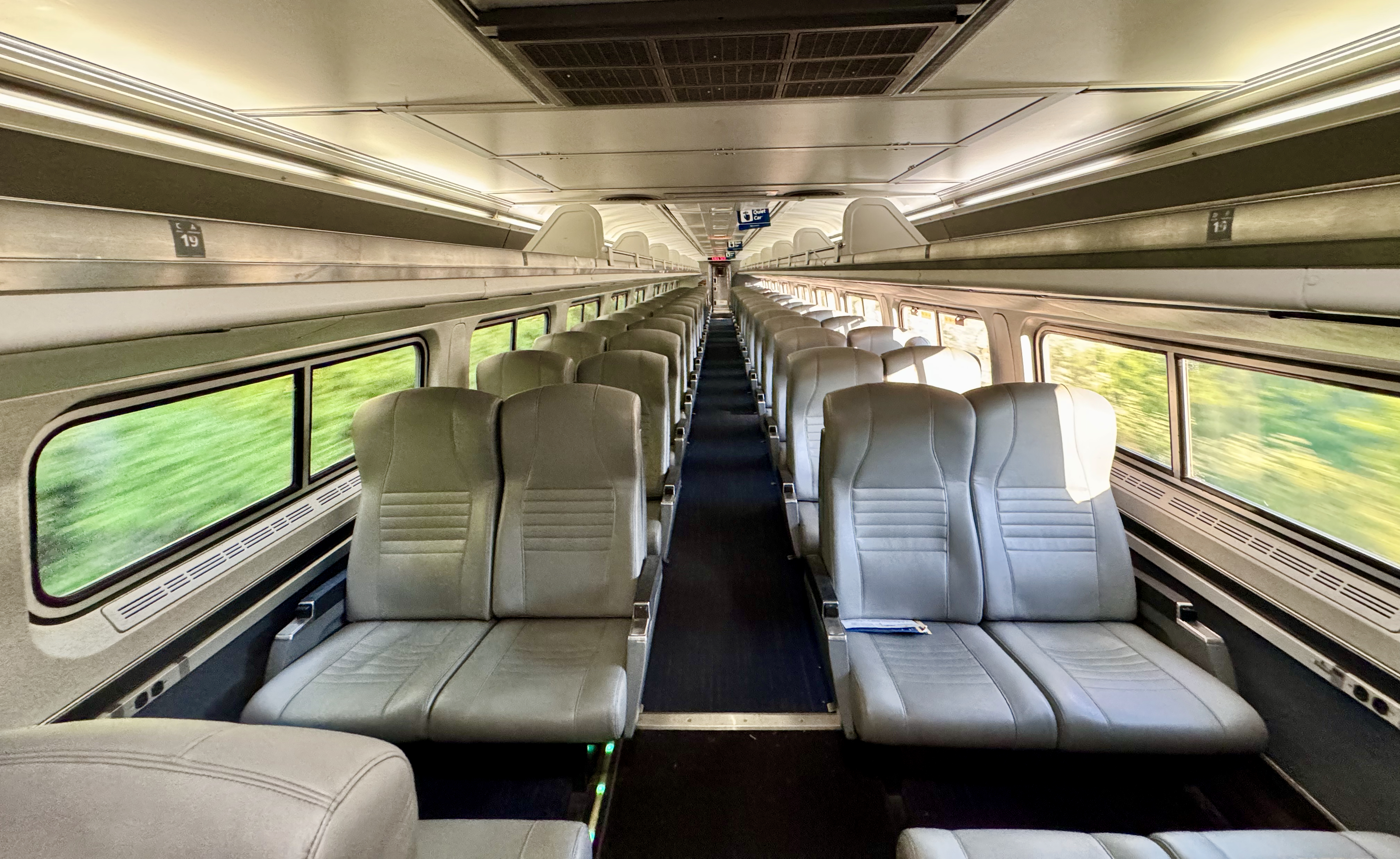
- Amfleet I quiet car interior
- In service: Amfleet I: 1975–present; Amfleet II: 1981–present
- Manufacturer: Budd Company
- Built at: Philadelphia, PA
- Family name: Budd Metroliner
- Number built: Amfleet I: 492; Amfleet II: 150
- Number in service: Amfleet I: 447 (October 2025); Amfleet II: 136 (October 2025)
- Formation: Single car
- Fleet numbers: 25000–25124 (Amfleet II coach); 28000–28024 (Amfleet II diner-lites); 43344–43397 (Amfleet I full dinettes); 48140–48196 (Amfleet I club-dinettes); 81501–81547 (Amfleet I business class); 82500–82999 (Amfleet I coach)
- Capacity: Up to 84 seats
- Operator: Amtrak

Specifications
- Car body construction: Stainless steel
- Car length: 85 ft 4 in (26.01 m)
- Width: 10 ft 6 in (3.20 m)
- Height: 12 ft 8 in (3.86 m)
- Floor height: 51 1/2 in (1,310 mm)
- Platform height: Low: 17 in (430 mm); High: 51 in (1,300 mm)
- Doors: Amfleet I: 2 pairs end doors, automatic operation; Amfleet II: 1 pair end door, manual operation
- Maximum speed: 125 mph (201 km/h)
- Weight: 106,000–113,000 lb (48,000–51,000 kg)
- Power supply: 480 V AC
- HVAC: Electric heat and air conditioning
- Bogies: Budd Pioneer
- Braking systems: Pneumatic, 2 tread and 2 disc per axle
- Coupling system: AAR type H
- Track gauge: 4 ft 8 1/2 in (1,435 mm) standard gauge

Amfleet is a fleet of single-level intercity railroad passenger cars built by the Budd Company for American company Amtrak in the late 1970s and early 1980s. Budd based the Amfleet design on its earlier Metroliner electric multiple unit. An initial order for 57 cars in 1973 to supplement the Metroliners on the Northeast Corridor grew to two orders totaling 642 cars, sufficient to reequip all the services on the Northeast Corridor and many other routes around the United States. The first 492 cars, known as Amfleet I and completed between 1975 and 1977, were designed for short-distance service. A second order of 150 cars, known as Amfleet II and completed between 1980 and 1983, were designed for long-distance service. They were the last intercity passenger cars built by Budd.

Car types include both long- and short-distance coaches, cafés, club cars, and lounges. Since the construction of the cars, multiple rebuildings have eliminated the club cars and lounges in favor of business class cars, club-dinettes, and "diner-lite" dining cars. Amtrak experimented with sleeping car conversions in the 1970s, but did not pursue the idea. The Amfleet I has vestibules on both ends of the car for faster unloading, while the Amfleet II has a single vestibule. The Amfleet II also has slightly larger windows.

The Amfleets were the first new locomotive-hauled intercity cars ordered by Amtrak and the first such cars built in the United States since 1965. Their introduction in the mid-1970s led to improved reliability for Amtrak's trains and ridership gains. As of 2023, Amfleet cars are used extensively in the eastern and midwestern United States, forming the backbone of Amtrak's single-level fleet, with 580 out of the original 642 in service as of October 1, 2023.

== Background ==
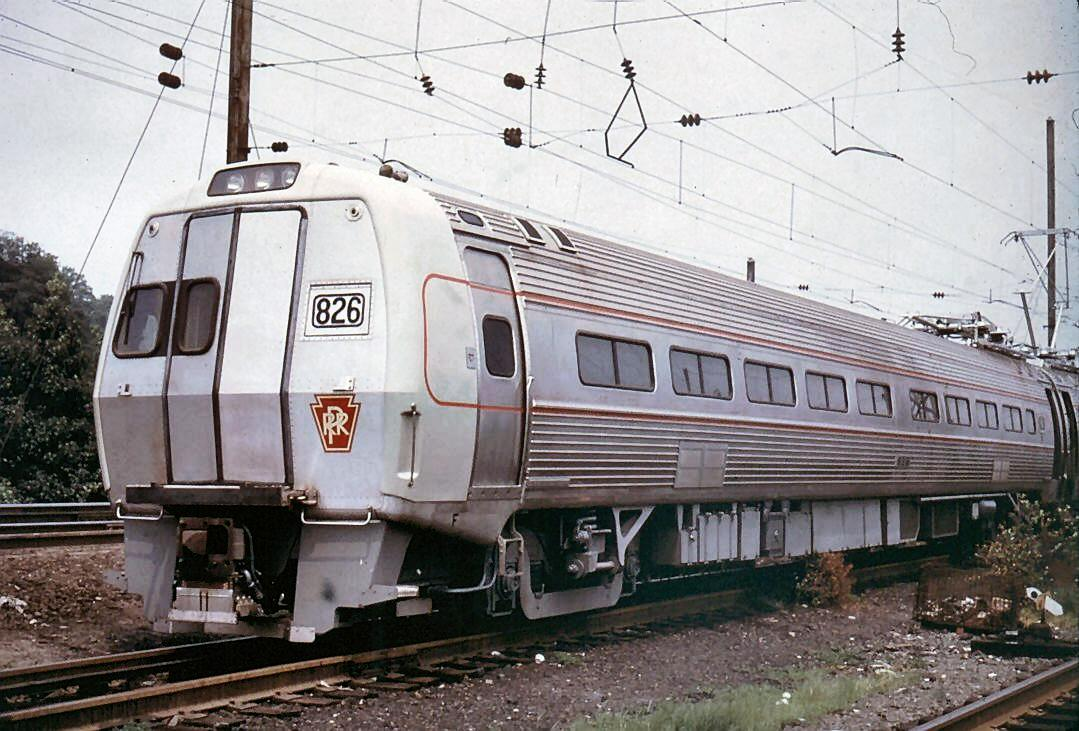
The Budd Metroliners were the basis of the Amfleet design.

Amtrak assumed control of almost all private sector intercity passenger rail service in the United States on May 1, 1971, with a mandate to reverse decades of decline. It retained approximately 184 of the 440 trains which had run the day before. To operate these trains, Amtrak inherited a fleet of 300 locomotives (electric and diesel) and 1190 passenger cars, most of which dated from the 1940s–1950s. These cars were aging, in need of maintenance, and in many cases incompatible with each other. The company recognized the need and opportunity to standardize on a single design.

Very few railcars had been built for inter-city service in the United States since the 1950s; the last locomotive-hauled cars were an order of ten coaches built by Pullman-Standard for the Kansas City Southern Railway in 1965. An important exception was the Budd Metroliner electric multiple unit. This fleet of 61 cars had begun operation between Washington, D.C., and New York City on the Northeast Corridor in 1969 under Penn Central and quickly gained acceptance with the traveling public, despite various engineering problems. Writing in the mid-1970s, railroad historian John H. White Jr. described them as "Amtrak's brightest star." In 1973, Budd still had the tooling in place from the Metroliner order, meaning that any new order derived from that design could begin almost at once.

== History ==
=== Amfleet I ===
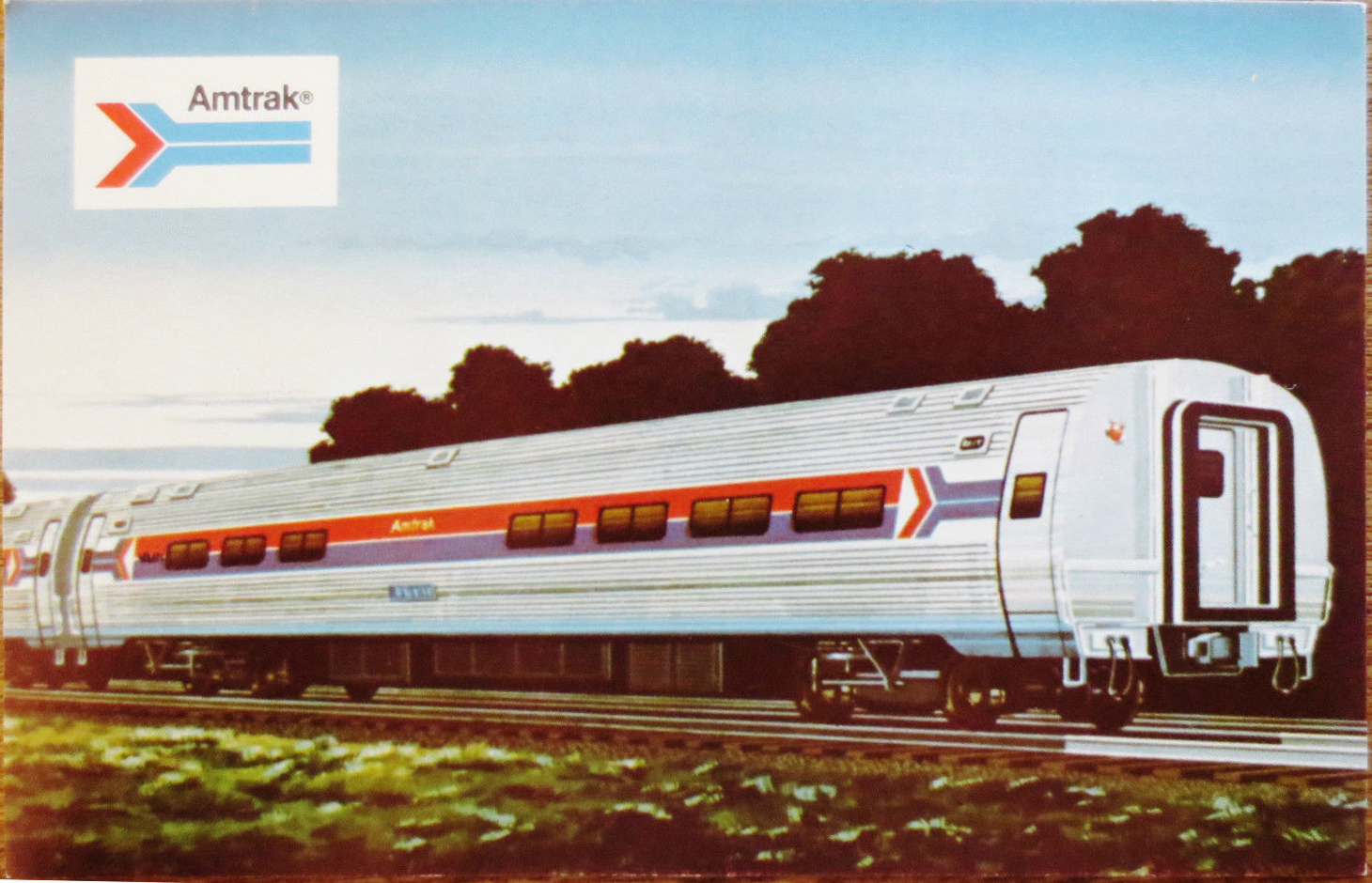
Mid-1970s postcard advertising the then-new Amfleet cars

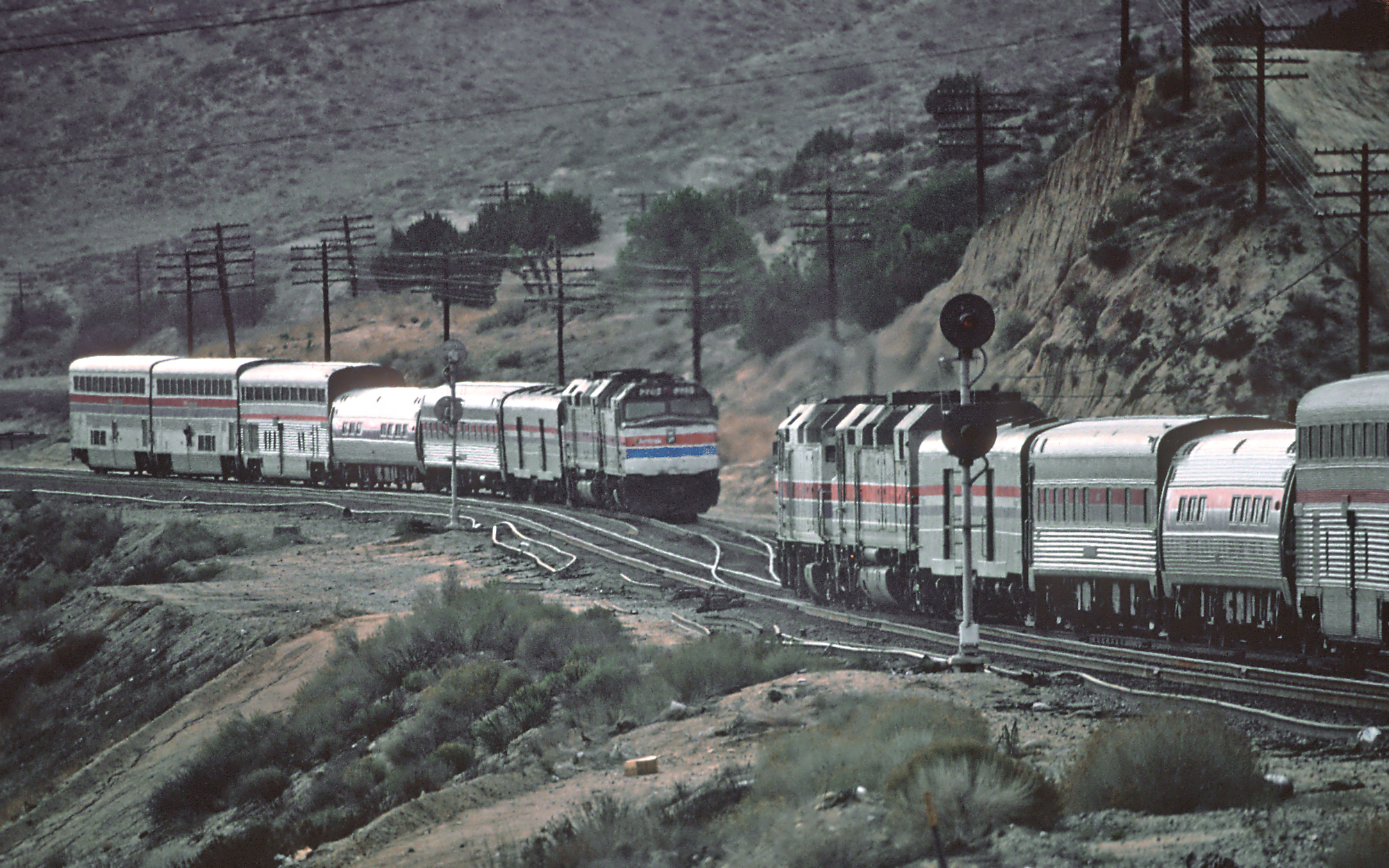
Some Amfleets saw service on western long-distance trains until the completion of the Superliner I order. These 1981 Desert Winds had a Heritage Fleet sleeping car, Amfleet I dinette, Hi-Level transition coach, and Superliner I coaches.

Amtrak placed a $24 million order with Budd on October 12, 1973, for 57 "non-powered Metroliner cars." These, together with new GE E60 electric locomotives, were to provide additional Metroliner service on the Northeast Corridor. Amtrak expanded its plans in June 1974, ordering 200 more cars for $81 million. On October 25, it added another 35 cars. Finally, in April 1975, with the first deliveries imminent, Amtrak added 200 more cars to the order for $86 million. This brought the first order to 492 cars, with a total cost of $192 million. Amtrak intended to use 212 of the cars on Northeast Corridor service between Washington and New York; unlike the electric Metroliners, the Amfleet cars could continue through to Boston, Massachusetts.

A public unveiling took place at the Budd plant in Northeast Philadelphia on June 19, 1975, after which four cars were sent to the High Speed Ground Test Center in Pueblo, Colorado, for evaluation. The first Amfleet cars began running on the Northeast Corridor on August 5, 1975. Amtrak heralded their arrival, calling 1975 "the Year of the Amfleet." As the cars were distributed throughout the system, timetables would note that trains now had "Amfleet Service" and that trains had been "Amfleeted." A 1978 study conducted by the Federal Railroad Administration (FRA) found that ridership increased 11% on the Amfleet-equipped Northeast Corridor trains, with at least some passengers choosing the slower but more comfortable Amfleets over the faster but less reliable Metroliners.

The rollout of Amfleets throughout the system was restricted by the availability of locomotives with HEP or special generator cars. The first route outside the Northeast Corridor to receive Amfleets was the Washington–Martinsburg Blue Ridge, on December 1. By November 1976, 350 Amfleets had been delivered and 78% of Amtrak's short-haul trains used either Amfleets or equally-modern Turboliner trainsets. Besides the Blue Ridge, routes using Amfleets outside the Northeast Corridor included the New York–Newport News, Virginia Colonial, the Chicago, Illinois–Detroit, Michigan Twilight Limited and Wolverine, the Chicago–St. Louis, Missouri Abraham Lincoln and State House, the Chicago–Quincy, Illinois Illinois Zephyr, the Chicago–Carbondale, Illinois Illini and Shawnee, the Chicago–Dubuque, Iowa Black Hawk, the Los Angeles–Bakersfield, California San Joaquin, the Los Angeles–San Diego, California San Diegan, the Portland, Oregon–Seattle, Washington Mount Rainier and Puget Sound, and the Seattle–Vancouver, British Columbia Pacific International.

The Amfleet's modern HEP system proved invaluable during the unusually harsh winter of 1976–1977, which sidelined many of Amtrak's aging steam-heated coaches. Amtrak suspended numerous routes and pressed the short-distance Amfleet I coaches into long-distance service. The new EMD F40PH diesel locomotive, itself designed for short-haul service, handled many of these trains. Budd completed delivery of the Amfleet I order on June 9, 1977.

=== Amfleet II ===
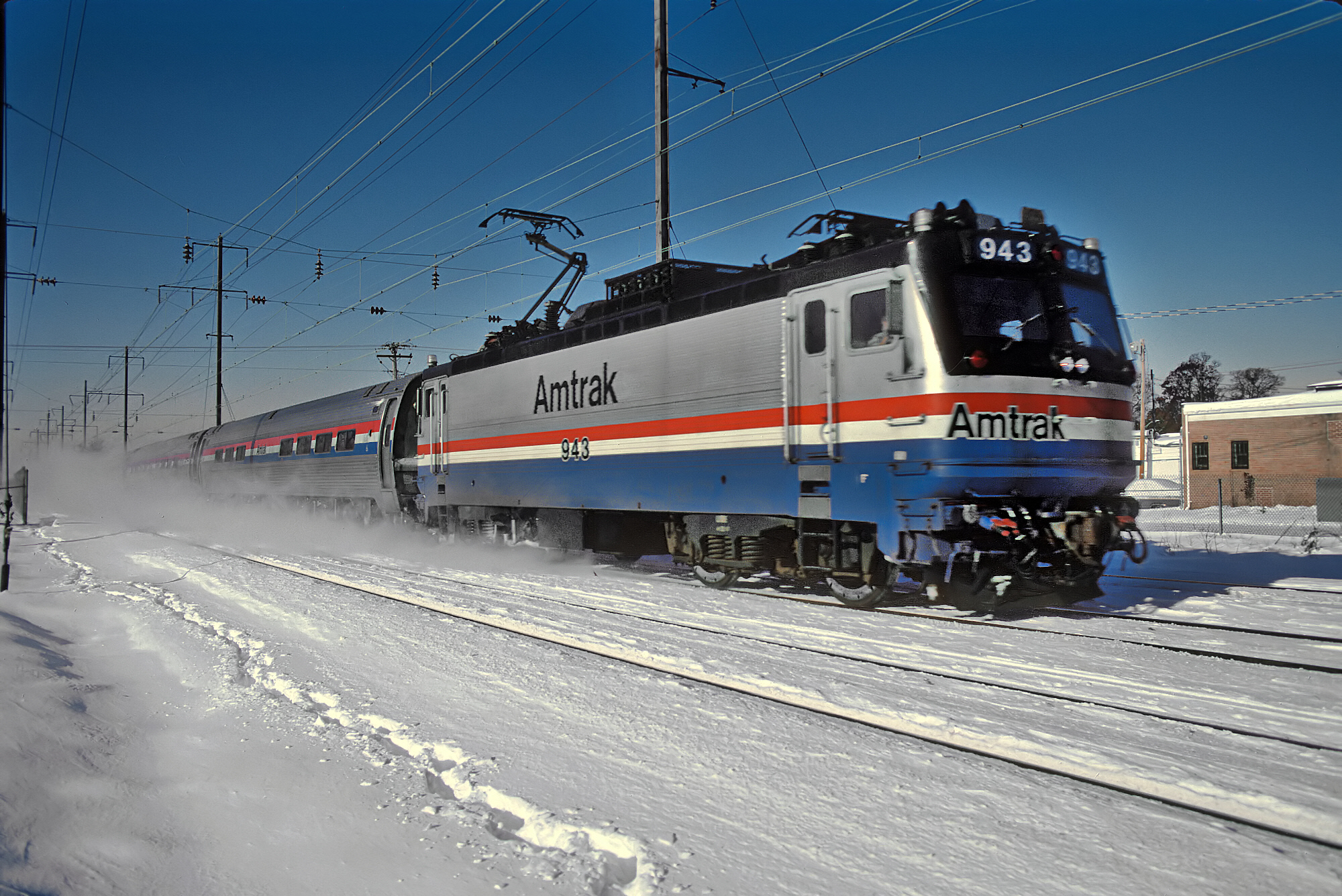
An AEM-7 hauling Amfleets on a Metroliner service in 1987

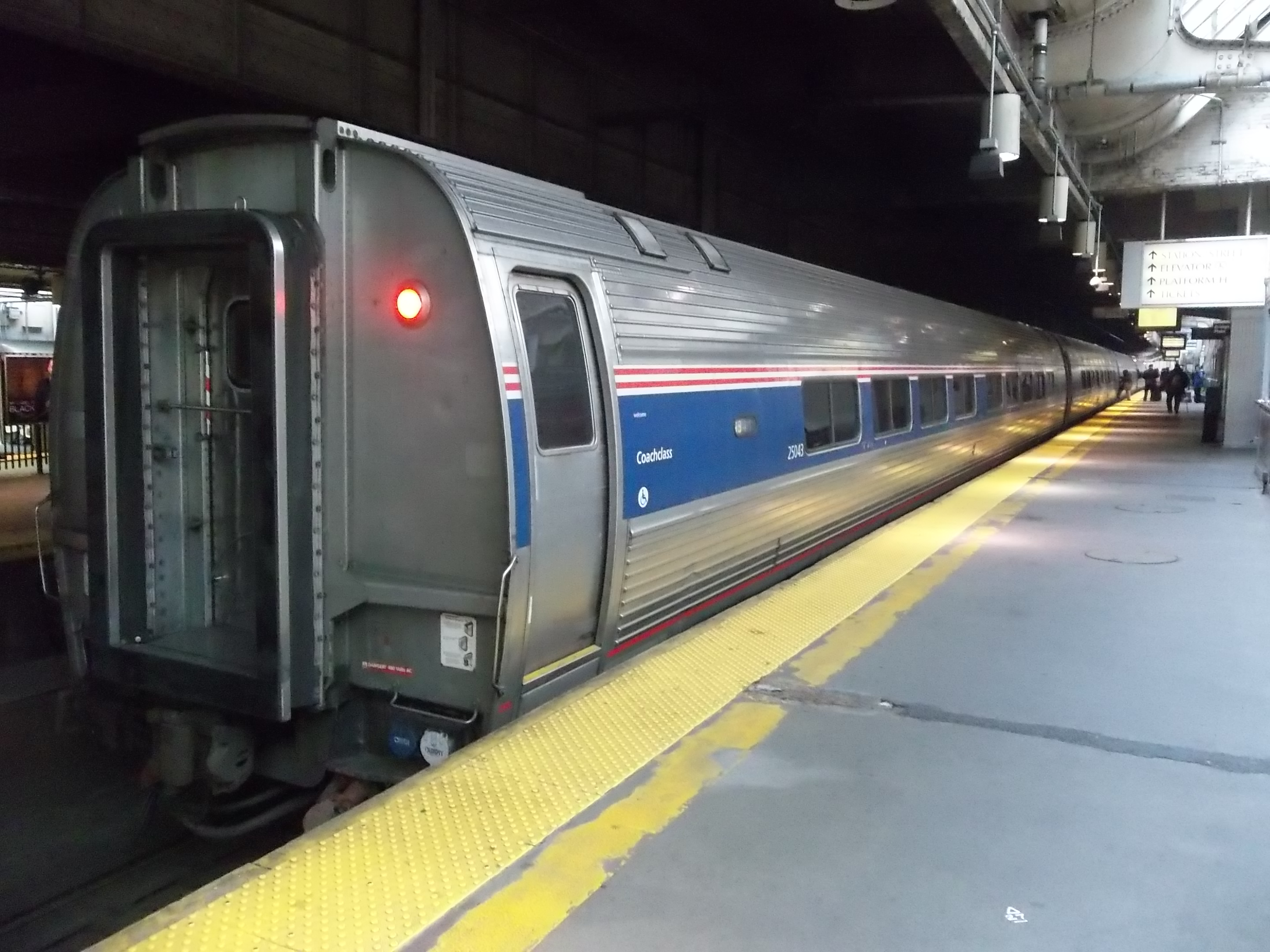
An Amfleet II coach, showing the single vestibule as opposed to vestibules on both ends

Amtrak ordered 150 more Amfleet cars from Budd on March 13, 1980, at a cost of $150 million. These cars, dubbed Amfleet II, were intended to replace rolling stock on Amtrak long-distance trains, and featured larger windows, more legroom, and folding legrests. Budd delivered the first four cars on October 28, 1981; the unveiling took place on November 11. The final cars arrived on June 11, 1983. The Amfleet IIs were the last intercity cars Budd built. The continuing unreliability of the original Metroliners led to refurbished Amfleet I coaches displacing them in Metroliner service in 1981. New EMD AEM-7 electric locomotives pulled the trains.

Unlike the Superliner-equipped trains in the Western United States, Amtrak's eastern long-distance single-level trains never operated with uniform consists. The trains operated with a combination of Amfleet and Heritage Fleet cars, supplemented in the 1990s by Viewliner sleeping cars. In 1990, Amfleets could be found on every long-haul route east of the Mississippi River: the Virginia–Florida Auto Train; the Chicago–New Orleans City of New Orleans; the New York–Florida Silver Meteor and Silver Star, the New York–Chicago Broadway Limited, Cardinal, and Lake Shore Limited; the Washington, D.C.–Chicago Capitol Limited; the New York–New Orleans Crescent; and the Washington, D.C.–Montreal Montrealer. Horizon Fleet coaches replaced Amfleet coaches on most Midwestern and California short-haul routes in 1989–1990. The Superliner II order in the early 1990s would lead to the removal of Amfleets from the Auto Train and Capitol Limited. The Cardinal used Superliners and terminated at Washington, D.C., between 1995 and 2002.

=== Replacement ===
At the end of 2012, 473 Amfleet I and 145 Amfleet II cars were still in service. The Amfleet I cars had traveled an average of 4,125,000 miles (6,638,544 km), the Amfleet II cars 5,640,000 miles (9,076,700 km). The Amfleet I cars continue to be used on corridor services in the Northeastern United States such as the Downeaster, Empire Service, and Northeast Regional, although they can also be found in the Midwest and California. Amfleet IIs continue to be used on single-level long-distance trains. Amtrak announced an overhaul of the Amfleet I interiors in September 2017. The following year, Amtrak began to investigate options to replace the Amfleet I cars altogether.

In January 2019, Amtrak issued a request for proposals to replace the 470 Amfleet I cars and ex-Metroliner cab cars then in use. Proposals were due on May 1, 2019. In May 2020, excursion operator Railexco purchased three Amfleet cars from Amtrak – the first Amfleet cars to be sold for private reuse. In 2023, three Amfleet cars were acquired by the Mexican government for Tren Interoceánico service.

By February 2021, Amtrak planned for the replacements to be trainsets rather than individual cars, with options for diesel, electric, or dual-mode propulsion. Siemens was announced as the preferred bidder in April 2021, with contract execution for 83 trainsets expected midyear. The equipment is expected to be delivered between 2025 and 2035. In July 2021, it was announced that $7.3 billion would be put towards the new equipment. Amtrak announced in 2022 that it plans to begin retiring Amfleet I cars by 2027, with all cars to be retired by the end of 2030.

In December 2022, Amtrak reached an agreement with Siemens for 83 "Airo" trainsets for delivery starting in 2026, at which time they would begin by replacing the Amtrak Cascades fleet. After replacing the Cascades fleet, the Airo would begin the process of replacing the Amfleet I fleet in 2027. Following the removal of Horizon railcars from service in March 2025, several Amfleet I cars were sent to the Pacific Northwest to be used on the Cascades service, which had been left with only one working trainset. Procurement for a new overnight fleet, including possible replacement of the Amfleet II cars, began in 2022. In October 2025, Amtrak issued a request for information for firms to buy and scrap the Amfleet fleet.

== Design ==
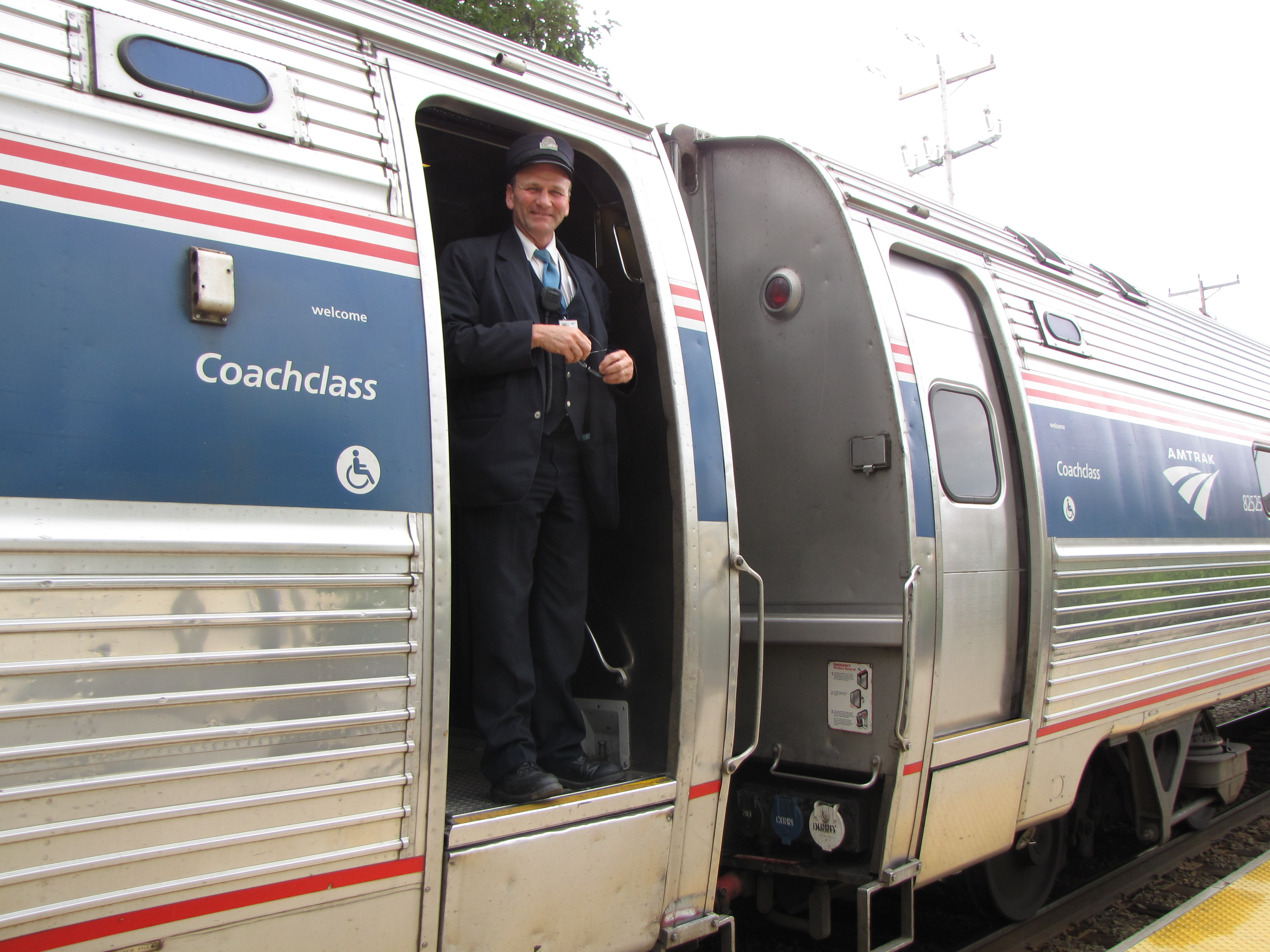
A conductor stands in the vestibule on an Amfleet I coach. The trapdoors are in the closed position

As designed, the Amfleet I cars could operate at speeds up to 120 mph (193 km/h). Both the Amfleet I and Amfleet II are now rated for 125 mph (201 km/h). Electric heating and air conditioning, operated by head-end power (HEP) from the locomotive, are used to maintain passenger comfort. Budd moved the air vents from the bottom, where they had been on the Metroliner, to the top of the car. The top-mounted vents were less susceptible to clogging during snowfall.

An Amfleet car is 12 feet 8 inches (3.86 m) tall, 10 feet 6 inches (3.20 m) wide, and 85 feet 4 inches (26.01 m) long. The car body itself is built up from spot-welded stainless steel sections. The Budd Pioneer trucks have dual disc brakes on each axle; a later rebuild added tread brakes. The wheels have a diameter of 36 inches (914.40 mm). The cars meet the FRA's buff strength requirement of 800,000 pounds (363,000 kg).

The interior design recalled contemporary jet airliners. In common with airliners the cars featured narrow windows, which inhibited sight-seeing. The windows on the Amfleet I cars were 18 by 64 inches (45.72 by 162.56 cm); this was increased to 22 by 64 inches (55.88 by 162.56 cm) in the Amfleet II. Another factor in choosing small windows was the high incidence of rocks thrown at train windows in the 1970s. Reinforcing the impression of traveling in an airliner, the passenger seats themselves were built by the Amirail division of Aircraft Mechanics Inc. Cesar Vergara, head of car design at Amtrak in the 1990s, criticized the choice to copy the airliner aesthetic:

Amfleet is a totally American style that was meant to imitate airplanes. That's my quarrel!...The vision for the future of the railroad should be based on defining its own dreams, not appropriating them solely from someone else's experience.

— Cesar Vergara, in "Amtrak's design on the future" (1992), Bob Johnston

Amfleet I cars can be identified by having vestibules at both ends of the cars; Amfleet II cars have a single vestibule. The Amfleet I has chemical flush toilets, while the Amfleet II has retention toilets. All Amfleet cars have trapdoors, permitting their use at both high- and low-level platforms. The distance from the rail to the bottom step is 17 inches (430 mm); to the floor level is 51 1/2 inches (1.31 m).

=== Coaches ===
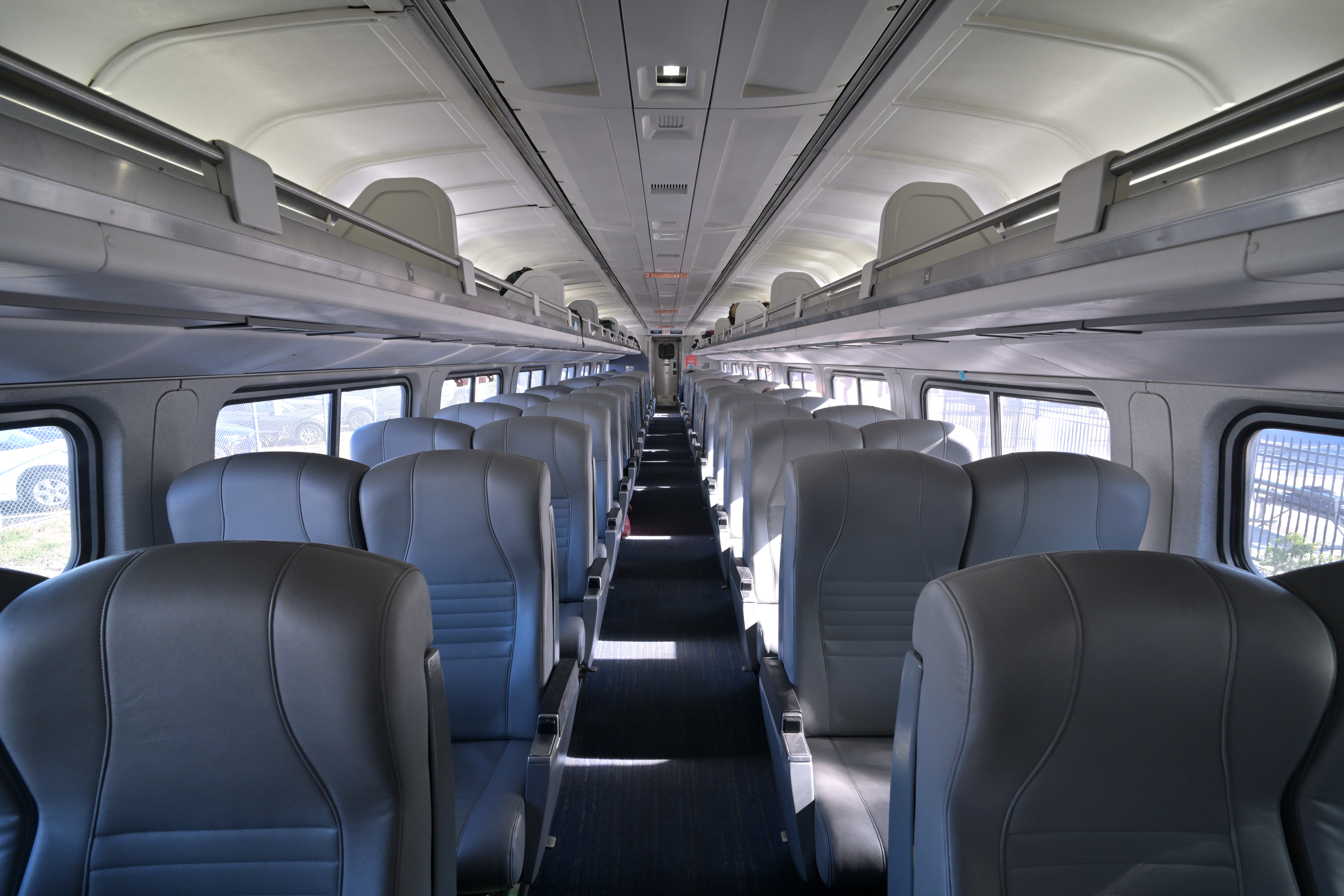
Interior of a refurbished Amfleet I coach on the Northeast Regional in 2025.

Budd built 361 Amfleet I coaches; 90 were configured for long-distance use (60 seats) and 271 for short-distance use (84 seats). All 125 Amfleet II coaches were designed for long-distance service and contained 59 seats. In all standard Amfleet coaches seating is 2×2; in the Amfleet II a single accessible seat accounted for the odd number. Amfleet seats have swing-down tray-tables for at-seat food service, as well as overhead and underseat luggage storage. There are two restrooms at one end of the car. There is a baggage rack at the end of the car. On some cars these have been replaced with a bicycle rack.

Under the Capstone refurbishment program most Amfleet I short-distance coaches had three rows of seats removed, reducing their total capacity from 84 to 72 seats. During the 1980s most of the Amfleet I long-distance coaches were refurbished for use on the premium Metroliner service on the Northeast Corridor. All have since been rebuilt, either as 62-seat business class cars or 72-seat short-distance cars.

=== Cafés ===
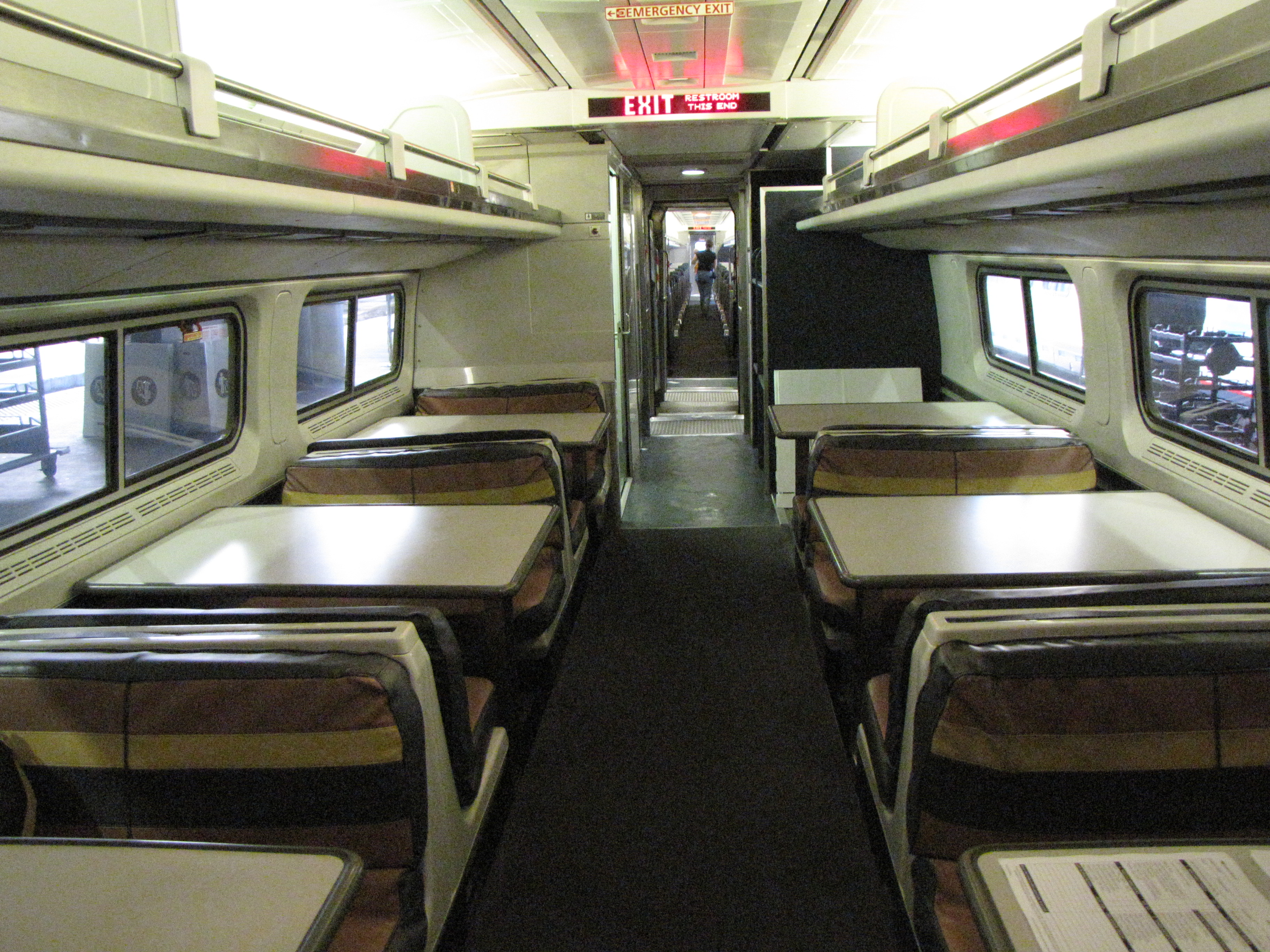
The open seating area in an Amfleet I club-dinette

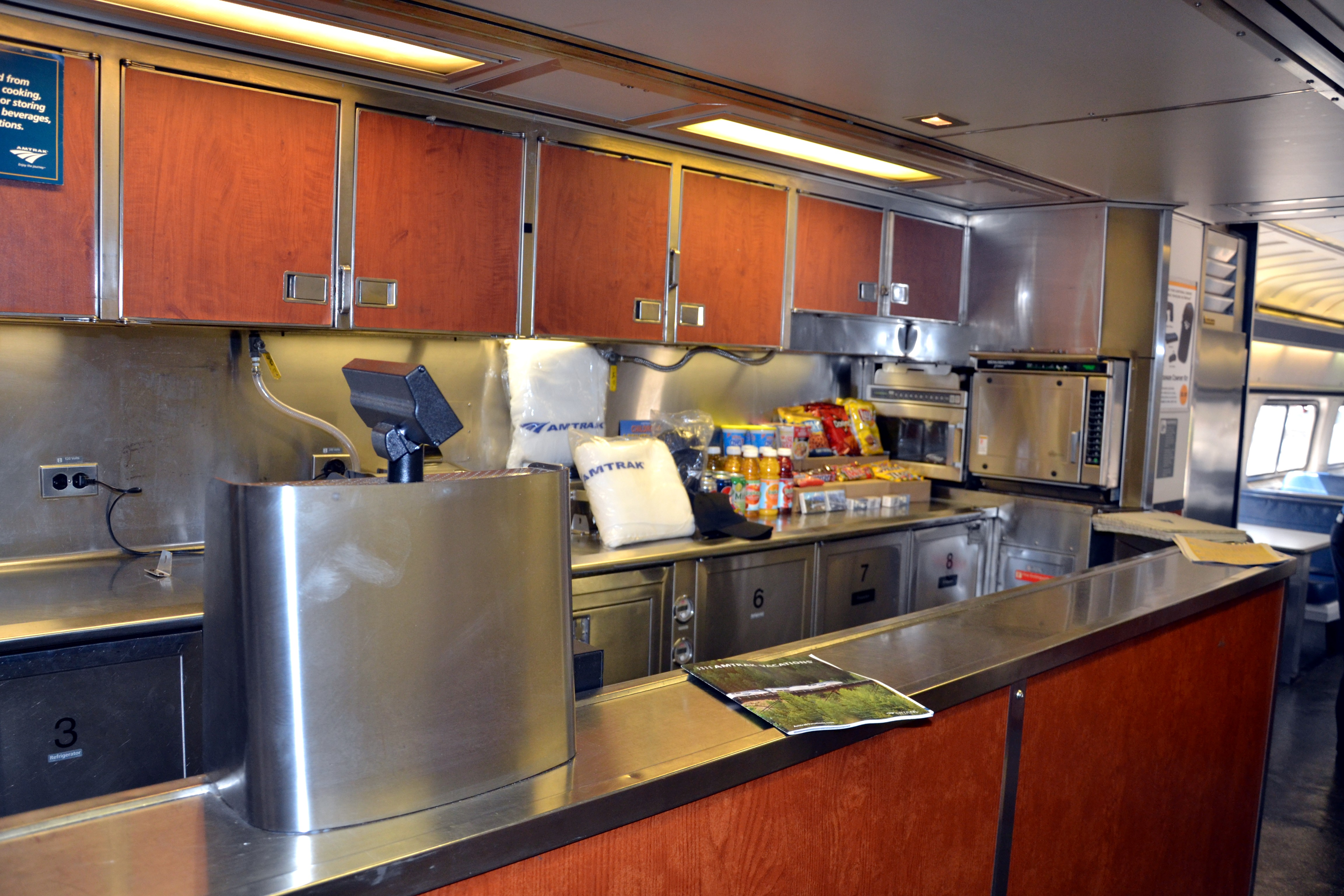
The mid-car serving area in an Amfleet café

Budd built 54 Amfleet I "Amcafe" cars and 37 Amfleet I "Amdinette" cars. The cafés had a snack bar in the middle of the car and 53 coach seats; the dinettes had eight booths and 23 coach seats. Each café car weighs about 110,000 pounds (50,000 kg).

The Amcafe design was unpopular and Amtrak rebuilt the cafés into numerous configurations during the 1980s and 1990s. These included all-table dinettes, club cars for use in Metroliner service, and club-dinettes with a mix of tables and club seats. By the 2010s most cafés were configured as club-dinettes; some had been converted into all-table dinettes. Five dinettes were rebuilt for use on the Inter-American, a long-distance train operating between Texas and St. Louis; lounge seats replaced the coach seats. 21 dinettes were also refurbished for Metroliner service. By the 2010s all the remaining dinettes were rebuilt with all-table seating, save two which were converted into short-distance coaches.

=== Club cars ===
Budd built 40 Amfleet I "Amclub" club cars, similar to traditional parlor cars. These cars had a snack bar in the center, 18 club seats in a 2×1 configuration, and 23 coach seats. These cars provided first class service on select trains. Amtrak later referred to these as "split" Amclubs; club cars rebuilt with all-club style seating were called "full" Amclubs.

None of the Amclubs remain in their original configuration. Three of the original club cars were delivered with all club-style seating for a total of 33 seats; five of the original style were rebuilt to match. As the original Metroliners were withdrawn many of the Amclubs were refurbished for use in Metroliner service. Three were rebuilt for use on the Montrealer; booths and lounge seating replaced the coach seating and club seats. These were later rebuilt as all-table dinettes. Most clubs were rebuilt as club-dinette cars, with one half given over to booths and the other having 2×1 business class seating. Others were rebuilt as full-length business class cars, with 62 seats. Still others were converted to 72-seat coaches.

=== Lounges ===
Budd built 25 Amfleet II "Amlounge" lounge cars. They differed from other food-service cars in that the snack-bar was off-center. On the shorter side were 27 seats in varying configurations; the longer side had ten four-seat booths. Amtrak rebuilt 14 of them as smoking lounges between 1998 and 2000: in the short end an enclosed lounge replaced the seating area. All 25 cars were rebuilt as diner-lite cars between 2006 and 2010. In this configuration the short end has 19 seats, arranged in booths; the long end has seven booths and a conductor's office. The Amfleet II lounge weighed 113,000 pounds (51,000 kg).

=== Sleeping cars ===
In the late 1970s Amtrak converted two Amfleet I coaches into sleepers (Nos. 22900 and 22901). Two prototype Superliner roomette modules were installed, displacing 12 seats. The cars were used on the Washington, D.C.–Cincinnati, Ohio Shenandoah. Regular sleepers returned to the Shenandoah in 1979 and the two coaches were returned to a standard configuration. These conversions were termed "Ampad."

== See also ==
- Budd SPV-2000: a self-propelled diesel multiple unit using the Amfleet shell
