= High-Speed Ground Transportation Act of 1965 =

U.S. legislation to foster the use of high-speed rail

- Long title: An Act to authorize the Secretary of Commerce to undertake research and development in high speed ground transportation, and for other purposes
- Enacted by: the 89th United States Congress

Citations
- Public law: Pub. L. 89–220
- Statutes at Large: 79 Stat. 893

Legislative history
- Signed into law by President Lyndon B. Johnson on September 30, 1965

The High-Speed Ground Transportation Act of 1965 (Public Law 89-220, 79 Stat. 893) was the first attempt by the U.S. Congress to foster the growth of high-speed rail in the U.S. The High Speed Ground Transportation Act was introduced immediately following the creation of Japan's first high-speed Shinkansen, or "bullet train" and was signed into law by President Lyndon B. Johnson as part of his Great Society infrastructure building initiatives. Johnson's remarks upon signing the bill included the following:

In recent decades, we have achieved technological miracles in our transportation. But there is one great exception.

We have airplanes which fly three times faster than sound. We have television cameras that are orbiting Mars. But we have the same tired and inadequate mass transportation between our towns and cities that we had 30 years ago.

Today, as we meet here in this historic room where Abigail Adams hung out her washing, an astronaut can orbit the earth faster than a man on the ground can get from New York to Washington. Yet, the same science and technology which gave us our airplanes and our space probes, I believe, could also give us better and faster and more economical transportation on the ground. And a lot of us need it more on the ground than we need it orbiting the earth.

So I hope this meeting this morning will provide a platform for us to get that kind of transportation. We must do it. We must start getting it now. In the past 15 years, travel between our cities has more than doubled. By 1985--only 20 years away--we will have 75 million more Americans in this country. And those 75 million will be doing a great deal more traveling.

So, we must find ways to move more people, to move these people faster, and to move them with greater comfort and with more safety.

This bill is a first step toward accomplishing some of those objectives.

One product of the bill was the creation of regular Metroliner service between New York City and Washington, D.C., at speeds which averaged 90.1 miles per hour (145 km/h), faster than even Acela Express trains operated between the two cities in 2012. The bill also resulted in the creation of the Office of High-Speed Ground Transportation in the Department of Commerce.

Senator Claiborne Pell was thanked by President Johnson for his persistence in pushing the High-Speed Ground Transportation Act of 1965 through congress and repeatedly bringing the issue to the president's attention.

The High Speed-Ground Transportation Act received broad bi-partisan support with only 23 out of 432 members of the U.S. House of Representatives voting against the act.

== Later attempts to build high-speed rail in the U.S. ==
President Barack Obama repeatedly asked Congress for funding for high-speed rail projects. However, no high-speed rail projects had been completed by the end of his second term in 2017. Despite this, two high-speed rail projects are currently under construction as of 2024. The California High-Speed Rail project, eventually linking the 5 largest cities in California, is planned to have its first operating segment, between Merced and Bakersfield, begin passenger service as soon as 2030. The Brightline West project is planned to be privately operated and link the Las Vegas Valley and Rancho Cucamonga in the Greater Los Angeles area, with service set to begin in as soon as 2028.
