= Office of High-Speed Ground Transportation =

The Office of High-Speed Ground Transportation was established in the United States Department of Commerce (DOC) to administer the requirements of the High Speed Ground Transportation Act of 1965 (Public Law 89-220, 79 Stat. 893) to "undertake research and development in high-speed ground transportation, including, but not limited to, components such as materials, aerodynamics, vehicle propulsion, vehicle control, communications, and guideways."

The office was transferred to DOT and assigned to Federal Railroad Administration (FRA) in 1967. The office was terminated in 1972, with functions transferred to the FRA's newly established Office of the Associate Administrator for Research, Development, and Demonstrations.

One notable product of the office was report commissioned from National Analytics on The Needs and Desires of Travelers in the Northeast Corridor: A Survey of the Dynamics of Mode Choice Decisions.
