= Surfliner =

Surfliner may refer to:

- Pacific Surfliner, a passenger train service in Southern California, United States
- Surfliner (railcar), a family of bi-level intercity railcars
