= California Car (railcar) =

Class of American bi-level car

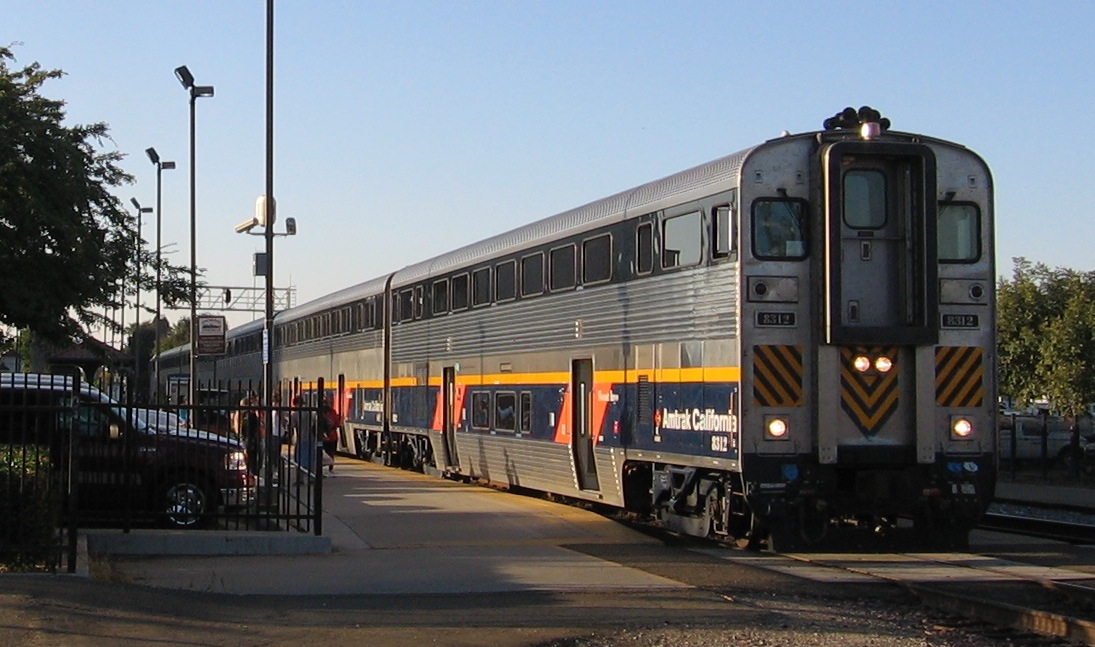
- "California Car" coach/cab car leading the San Joaquin in Fresno, CA

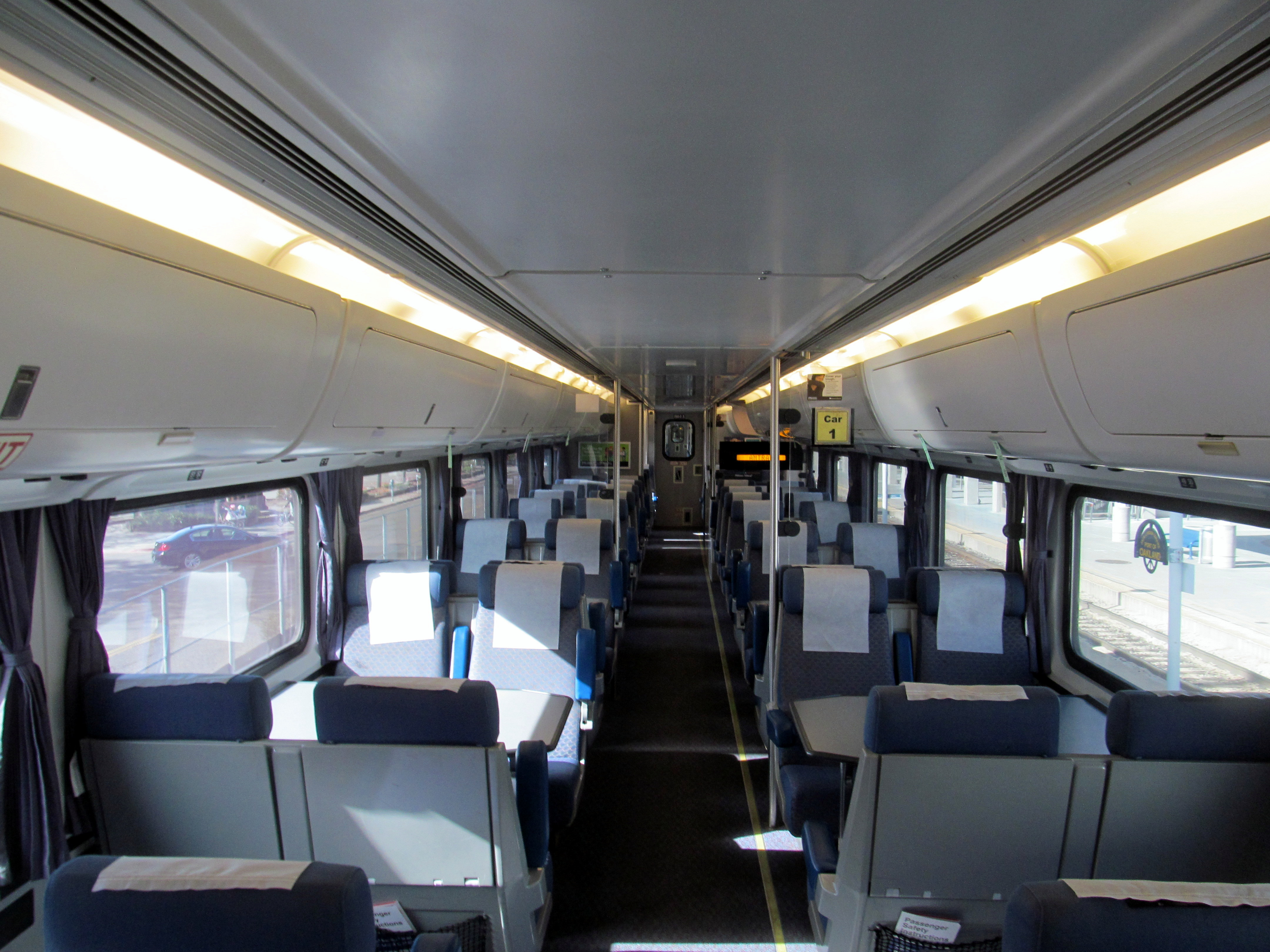
- Upper level of a California Car
- Manufacturer: Morrison-Knudsen/American Passenger Rail Car Company (Amerail)
- Built at: Hornell, New York
- Family name: Superliner
- Constructed: 1994–1997
- Refurbished: 2009–2012 by Alstom at Mare Island
- Number built: 66
- Formation: single car
- Fleet numbers: 8000 series
- Capacity: 89 seated, 1 wheelchair position (coach car)
- Operators: Amtrak & Caltrans as Amtrak California
- Depot: Oakland
- Lines served: Capitol Corridor, Gold Runner, Pacific Surfliner

Specifications
- Car length: 85 ft 0 in (25.91 m)
- Width: 10 ft 2 in (3.10 m)
- Height: 16 ft 2 in (4.93 m)
- Entry: Step
- Doors: 2 sets of bi-parting automatic doors per side
- Maximum speed: 125 mph (201 km/h)
- Power supply: 480 V AC 60 Hz
- Bogies: GSI 70
- Braking system: Air
- Coupling system: AAR
- Track gauge: 4 ft 8 1/2 in (1,435 mm) standard gauge

The California Car is the first generation of intercity railcars owned by the California Department of Transportation (Caltrans) and operated by Amtrak under the Amtrak California brand on intercity corridor routes in Northern and Central California. The cars were built in the mid-1990s for the Caltrans Division of Rail by Morrison–Knudsen and the American Passenger Rail Car Company (Amerail). The cars are similar in exterior dimensions to Amtrak's Superliner, but original in design to provide rolling stock suitable for California intercity services up to six hours, with more frequent stops than most other Amtrak routes. All cars were overhauled by Alstom at its Mare Island facility between 2009 and 2012.

== History ==
In 1990, California residents passed Propositions 108, 111 and 116. Combined, the three measures authorized the sale of nearly $3 billion in bonds for the creation of rail services across the state including commuter rail and intercity rail. With this new source of money, the California Department of Transportation (Caltrans) set out to specify a standardized railcar that would be suitable for rail operations across the state. The result of this effort were original designs for both intercity and commuter rail cars, optimized for California service within the volume defined by the Amtrak Superliner. While the commuter rail version was never built, the intercity version has become very successful.

The first generation of these Bi-Level intercity cars was dubbed the "California Car" and incorporated numerous innovative features specified for California's intercity services. These include two large entry vestibules for high-volume passenger loading and unloading, two automatically controlled door pairs per side, an on-board wheelchair lift, two straight staircases, bicycle storage, large workstation tables, a food service car with an elevator to move food and other supplies to the sales counter on the upper level, center aisles of width compliant with the Americans with Disabilities Act, and control cab cars to allow for push-pull operation. Caltrans awarded the $155 million contract to build the California Cars to Morrison–Knudsen in February 1992. Morrison–Knudsen would later spin off its transit car manufacturing unit as the American Passenger Rail Car Company, or Amerail, in October 1995, which would complete the order.

The first cars were delivered in early 1995 and were first put in service on the San Diegan line (the predecessor to the Pacific Surfliner), followed later by the Capitol Corridor and San Joaquins routes. Train crews immediately encountered problems with the new cars, the biggest being the automatic doors. The doors failed ten times more often than cars operated by other agencies, causing service delays. Despite the problems, deliveries continued, and the final car arrived in California in the summer of 1997.

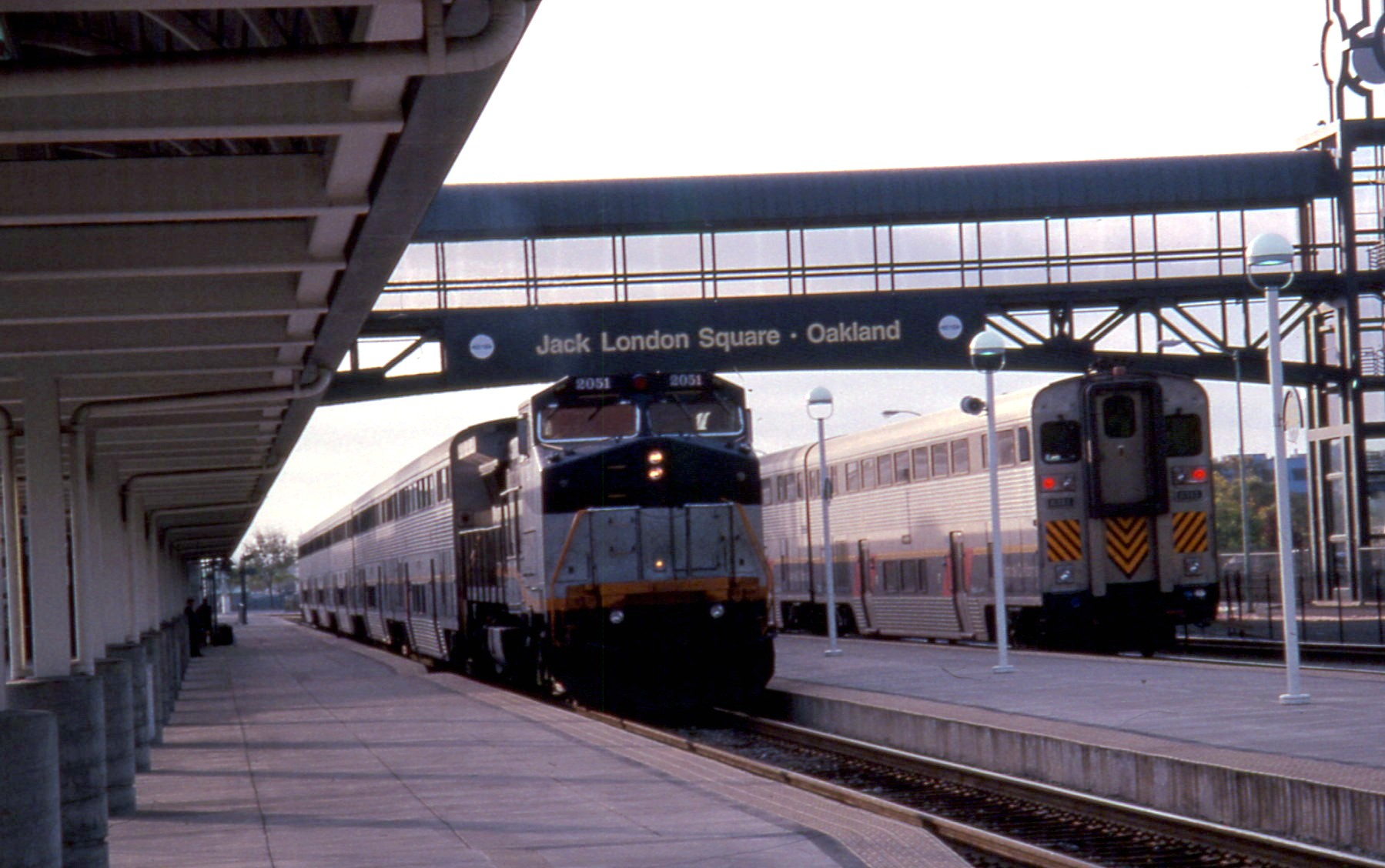
California Cars on San Joaquin and Capitol Corridor trains at Oakland in 1998.

In early 1998, documents obtained by the Contra Costa Times under the California Public Records Act revealed that in some cars floor panels were sagging and the suspension system was deemed "highly suspect and potentially unstable." Caltrans staff members and consultants warned that the cars did not live up to their cost and recommended extending warranties on floor panels for five years. Despite those warnings, Caltrans signed a settlement with the manufacturer in which Amerail agreed to make some repairs and agreed to warranty coverage only through August 1999. Caltrans defended the cars, calling them fundamentally sound and saying the settlement was the best deal available as Amerail was preparing to go out of business.

After the problematic delivery of the California Car, Amtrak set out to create a more advanced and reliable second generation of Bi-Level intercity car. These newer cars, dubbed the "Surfliner" were ordered from Alstom in February 1998 and were delivered between 2000 and 2001. The delivery of the new cars allowed Caltrans to remove the California Cars from the heavily used San Diegan route and assign them to operate only on the less demanding Capitol Corridor and San Joaquins routes.

Because of ongoing issues with the California Cars, Caltrans decided in 2009 to overhaul the roughly 10 year old fleet, about 10 years ahead of schedule. Caltrans awarded the $13 million overhaul contract to Alstom, the manufacturer of the Surfliner cars. Between 2009 and 2012, Alstom repaired the cars at its Mare Island, California, facility; the work included a complete replacement of the door systems. The overhaul has significantly improved reliability of the California Cars, which still see heavy use on the Capitol Corridor and Gold Runner routes.

== Description ==
A total of 66 California Cars were built (all numbered in the 8000 series) in four different types.

=== Coach cars ===
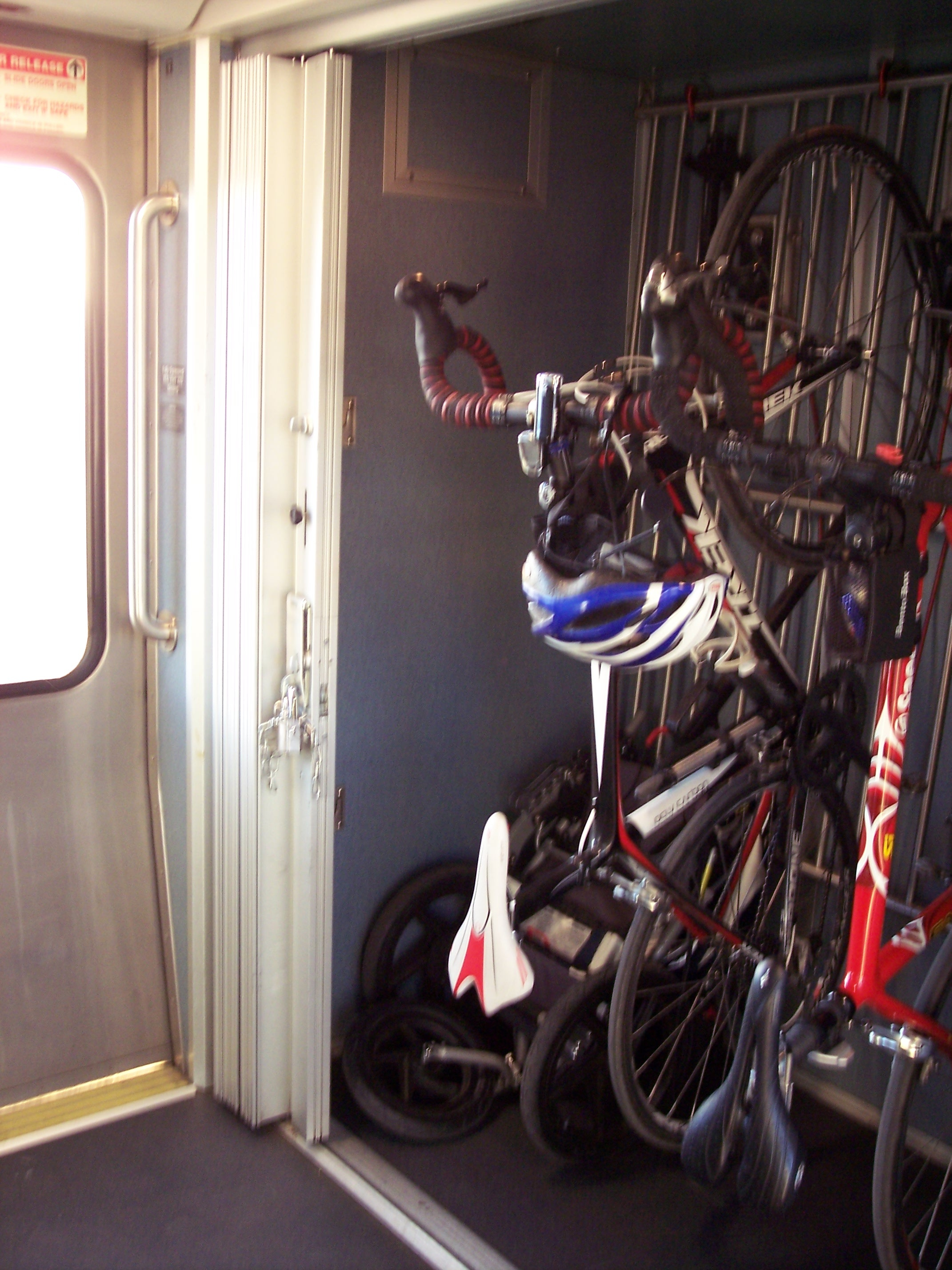
Bicycle rack on a California Car

32 coach cars were built for Amtrak California and all are named after California rivers. The coach cars have 76 seats on the upper level, 13 seats on the lower level and one wheelchair position on the lower level. There are 6 workstation tables on the upper level allowing groups of 4 to meet around a table with each other. There also 2 sets of club seating areas without tables where groups of 4 can sit facing each other. At the far ends of each coach car there are single seats on each side of the end door (that allows passengers to pass into another car) with a glass partition (to block noise from the end door). The lower level has two restrooms (one is wheelchair accessible) and a large luggage rack. On Capitol Corridor trains the shelves on the luggage rack are stowed, revealing securements for 3 bikes.

=== Coach/baggage cars ===
6 coach/baggage cars were built for Amtrak California and all are named after bays. The layout of upper level of the coach/baggage cars is identical to the coach cars with 76 seats, 6 tables and 2 club seating areas. The lower level has 7 seats, one wheelchair position, one restroom and a locked compartment used to store checked baggage. There is a staircase leading from the upper level down into this compartment which has a locked door at the top of the stairs. The coach/baggage cars were originally assigned exclusively to the San Joaquin.

=== Cab/coach cars ===
14 cab/coach cars were built for Amtrak California and all are named after mountains. As delivered, the cab/coach cars had a very similar layout to the coach cars except with 68 seats on the upper level. Recently some of the 13 seats on the lower level have been removed and a partition has been installed to create a baggage/bicycle compartment. On the Gold Runner trains this compartment is locked and used for storage of checked baggage, on Capitol Corridor trains the door to the compartment is left open and up to 13 bikes may be stored on racks.

=== Café cars ===
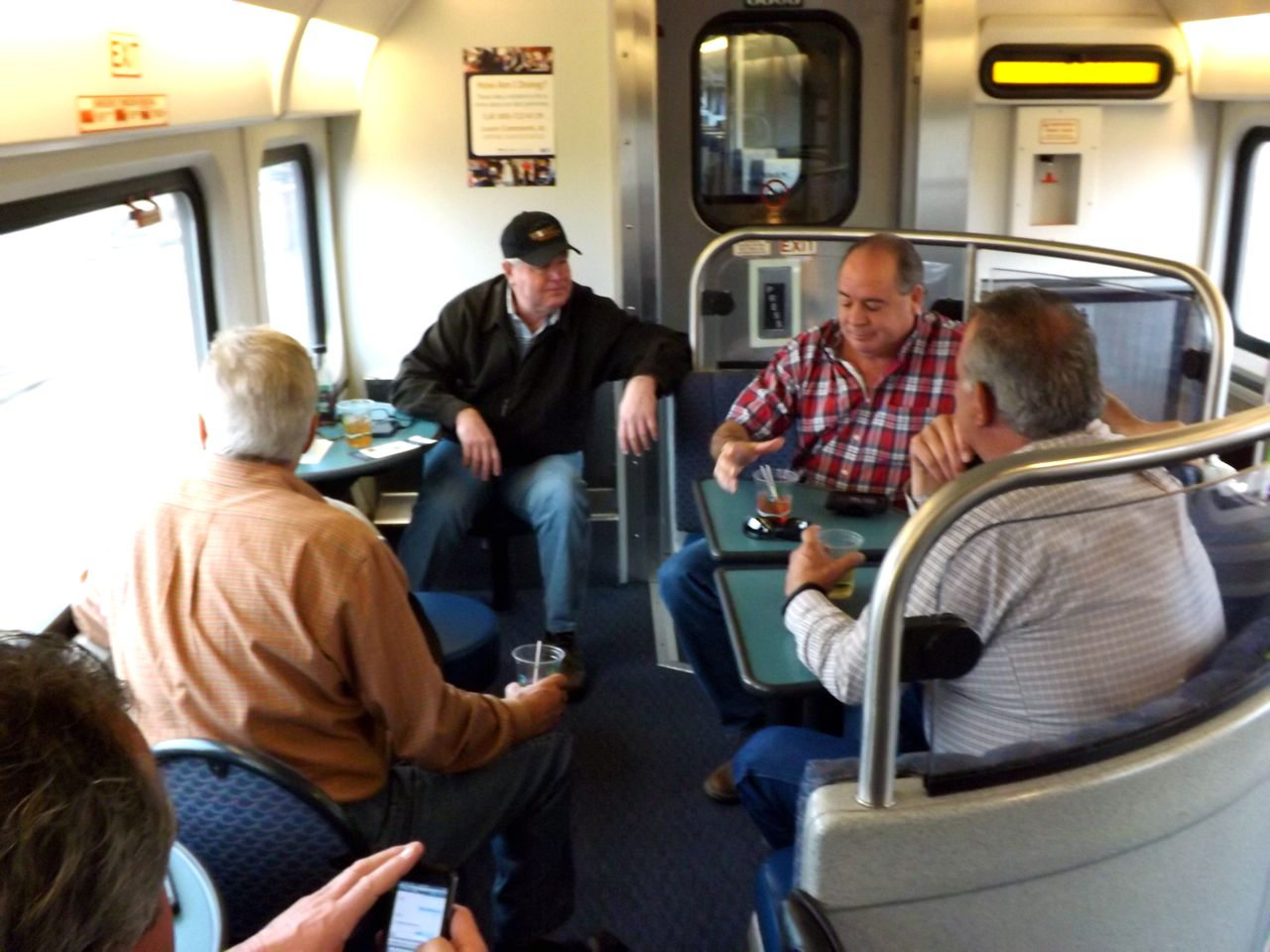
Passengers in the lounge seating area of the café car on a San Joaquin train, 2014

14 café cars were built for Amtrak California and all are named after valleys. The upper level of the café car is divided into three areas: a lounge seating area with small tables that face the windows, a table seating area with booths for 2, 3 and 4 people and a large galley where an attendant sells and prepares food. Passengers order from a walk up counter at the galley area and may take their items to a seat in the café car or back to their seat in a coach car.

The lower level of the café car has a restroom, a storage area for additional food/drink carts and additional table seating. This additional seating was originally designed to accommodate passengers with disabilities and serve as overflow seating but is now used as an office area for conductors and other Amtrak crew members and a door has been placed in front of the stairs down to this area.

Originally, the car offered full-service dining in the table seating area. An attendant would seat diners, take orders, prepare food in the galley and deliver it to passengers. Walk up service, like what is offered today, was offered by a second attendant in the lounge seating area. Even on the San Joaquin with its 6+ hour end to end travel time, the full-service dining option proved to be unpopular. The service and the second attendant position was eliminated. Passengers are now free to sit in any seat in the car.

== See also ==
- Surfliner (railcar) – The second generation intercity railcar, based on the California Car.
- Next Generation Bi-Level Passenger Rail Car – Cancelled third generation of bi-level intercity railcars.
