= Next Generation Bi-Level Passenger Rail Car =

Passenger rail car design for the United States

Next Generation Bi-Level Passenger Car
- Rendering of the Next Generation Bi-Level Passenger Rail Car
- Manufacturer: Nippon Sharyo
- Designer: Sumitomo Corporation
- Assembly: Rochelle, Illinois, United States
- Family name: Superliner
- Number built: 4 partial shells
- Successor: Siemens Venture

Specifications
- Car body construction: Stainless steel
- Track gauge: 4 ft 8 1/2 in (1,435 mm) standard gauge

The Next Generation Bi-Level Passenger Rail Car was a failed design of bilevel intercity railroad passenger cars that was to be built by Sumitomo, with construction subcontracted to Nippon Sharyo, for service in the United States. The contract was awarded in 2012 with delivery scheduled between 2015 and 2018. After delays in production, a prototype car failed buff strength testing in August 2015, leading to the cancellation of the contract with Nippon Sharyo. Siemens replaced Nippon Sharyo as the construction subcontractor in late 2017 and under the new contract, Siemens Venture railcars will be delivered between 2020 and 2023 instead of the bilevel design.

The bilevel cars were designed by the Next Generation Corridor Equipment Pool Committee (NGCE) under the provisions of the Passenger Rail Investment and Improvement Act of 2008. The cars were intended to replace single-level Amfleet and Horizon cars in the Midwest and supplement the bilevel Surfliner railcar and California Car railcars in California.

== History ==
The Next Generation Bi-Level Passenger Rail Car was to be the third generation of a design that began with the California Car, which entered service in 1996. The California Car was derived from the design of Amtrak's successful Superliner long-distance coach, which entered service in 1979, but modified to account for use on corridor services with more frequent stops. The California Car is designed with two wide lower-level door openings per side, rather than the single narrow door of the Superliner; interior stairways are straight single flights, rather than spirals; seating for trips of at most six hours; and with total accessibility as an original criterion, rather than as an adaptation. An improved version of the California Car, the Surfliner, entered service in 2000.

Caltrans and Amtrak began drafting the specification for a third generation of the design in 2006. This specification, dubbed "Corridor Car for the 21st Century" or C21, became the basis for the design work undertaken by the Next Generation Corridor Equipment Pool Committee (NGCE) under the provisions of the Passenger Rail Investment and Improvement Act of 2008 beginning in 2009.

The specification encompassed three car types: a standard coach, a combination cab-baggage car, and a cafe-lounge car. All three types would measure 16 feet 2 inches (4.93 m) high, 85 feet (26 m) long, and 10 feet 6 inches (3.20 m) wide. The cars were designed for low-level boarding only; the distance from the rail to the bottom step is 18 inches (460 mm). The coach would seat a maximum of 89 passengers, most of them on the upper level. Seating would be 2×2, with some table seating provided. Stairs at both ends of the car provided access between levels. There would be restrooms on both levels, and a bicycle rack on the lower level. The cab-baggage design would have capacity for 15 fewer passengers, with much of the lower level seating given over to checked baggage storage. The cafe-lounge would have a single staircase at one end, with the galley located centrally on the upper level. The car would have some passenger seating, but most space would be used for lounge seating.

Caltrans, on behalf of the state coalition (California, Michigan, Missouri and Illinois), issued a request for proposal (RFP) for building cars to the new bilevel specification in April 2012. Five companies submitted final proposals: Alstom, Construcciones y Auxiliar de Ferrocarriles (CAF), Kawasaki, Siemens, and Sumitomo. Caltrans awarded the contract to Sumitomo in November 2012. Sumitomo, in turn, selected Nippon Sharyo as the carbuilder for the order. The contract was for 130 cars, valued at $352 million. Eighty-eight of the cars were for the Midwestern states and 42 for California. Delivery of the new cars was scheduled for 2015–2018. The 88 Midwestern cars were funded by a $220 million American Recovery and Reinvestment Act of 2009 (ARRA) grant which, by law, had to be spent by September 30, 2017.

This ambitious schedule proved untenable. By May 2015, Caltrans acknowledged that the project was fourteen months behind schedule and replaced much of its project management team. The project slipped further that August when the new car shell failed a buff strength compression test. This failure forced a complete redesign of the car, delaying the project by at least two years. This would place delivery beyond the expiration of the ARRA funds.

In November 2017, Caltrans and Sumitomo announced that Siemens would replace Nippon Sharyo as a subcontractor. Under a new contract, valued at $371 million, Siemens would deliver 137 Siemens Venture single-level cars instead of bilevel cars. Cars deliveries started in mid-2020 and entered service in February 2022.

== See also ==
- California Car (railcar) – The first generation of Superliner derived bi-level intercity railcars.
- Surfliner (railcar) – The second generation intercity railcar, based on the California Car.
- Siemens Venture – The railcar that replaced the Next Generation Bi-Level Passenger Rail Car.
