= Superliner (railcar) =

Class of American double-deck, long-distance passenger cars

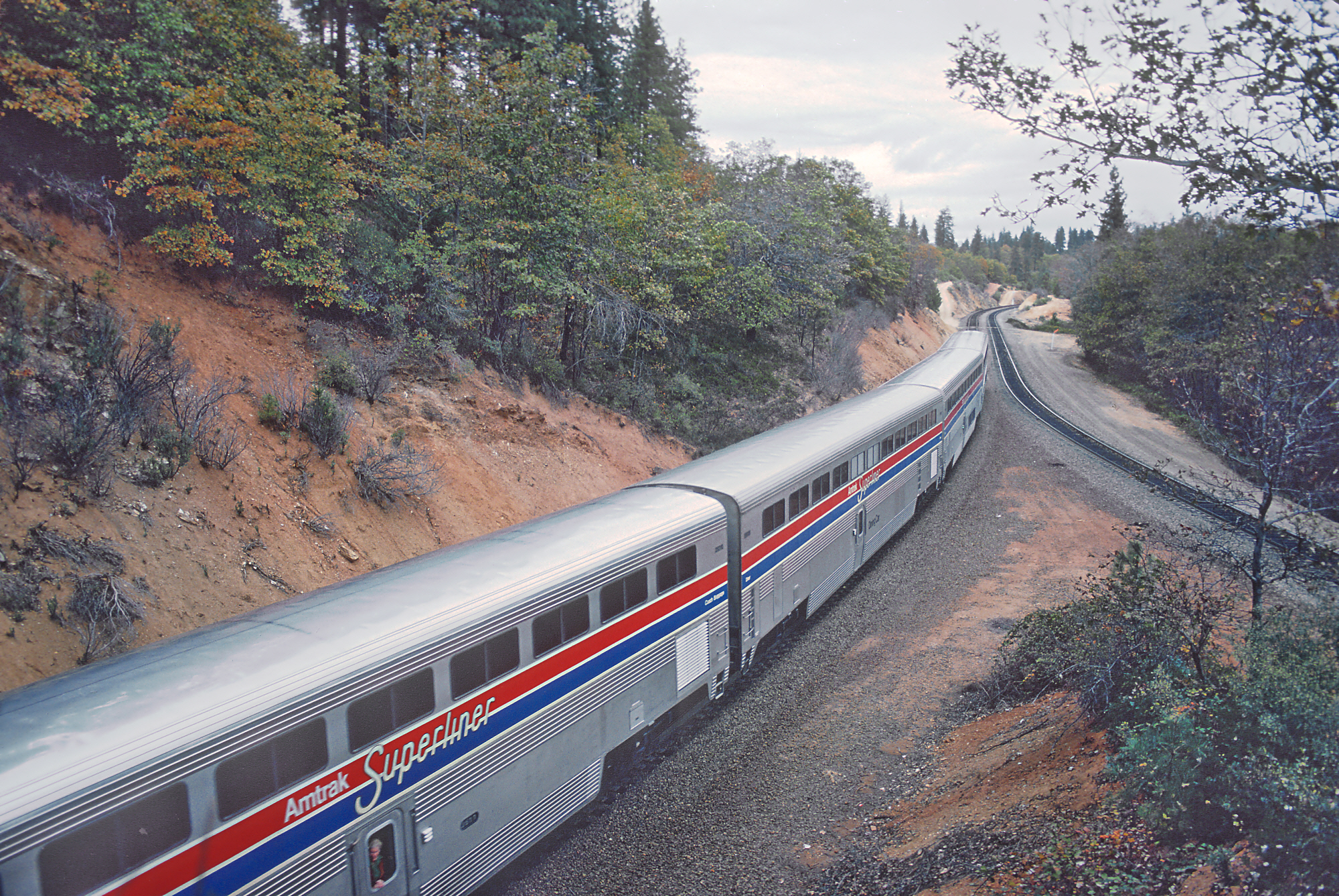
- Superliner I cars on the San Francisco Zephyr in November 1980

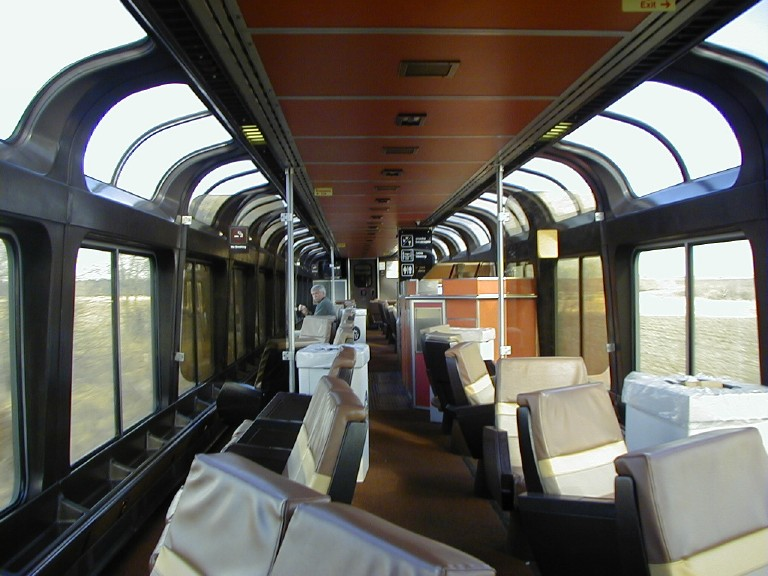
- Interior of a Superliner I Sightseer lounge
- Manufacturers: Pullman-Standard (Superliner I); Bombardier (Superliner II)
- Constructed: 1975–1981 (Superliner I); 1991–1996 (Superliner II)
- Entered service: 1979
- Number built: 479
- Number in service: 403 (October 2025)
- Operator: Amtrak
- Lines served: Auto Train, California Zephyr, City of New Orleans, Coast Starlight, Empire Builder, Heartland Flyer, Pere Marquette, Southwest Chief, Sunset Limited, and Texas Eagle

Specifications
- Car length: 85 ft 0 in (25.91 m)
- Width: 10 ft 2 in (3.10 m)
- Height: 16 ft 2 in (4.93 m)
- Platform height: 8 to 21.7 in (203.2 to 551.2 mm)
- Entry: Step
- Doors: 1 per side, manually operated
- Maximum speed: 100 mph (161 km/h)
- Weight: 151,235–174,000 lb (68,599–78,925 kg)
- Power supply: 480 V 60 Hz AC
- Bogies: Waggon Union MD-76 (Superliner I); GSI-G70 (Superliner II)
- Braking system: Air
- Track gauge: 4 ft 8 1/2 in (1,435 mm) standard gauge

The Superliner is a type of bilevel intercity railroad passenger car used by Amtrak, the national rail passenger carrier in the United States. Amtrak commissioned the cars to replace older single-level cars on its long-distance trains in the Western United States. The design was based on the Budd Hi-Level cars used by the Santa Fe Railway on its El Capitan trains. Pullman-Standard built 284 cars, known as Superliner I, from 1975 to 1981; Bombardier Transportation built 195, known as Superliner II, from 1991 to 1996. The Superliner I cars were the last passenger cars built by Pullman.

Car types include coaches, dining cars, lounges, and sleeping cars. Most passenger spaces are on the upper level, which has windows on both sides. The Sightseer Lounge observation cars have distinctive floor-to-ceiling windows on the upper level. Boarding is on the lower level; passengers climb up a center stairwell to reach the upper level.

The first Superliner I cars entered service in February 1979, with deliveries continuing through 1981. Amtrak assigned the cars to both long-distance and short-distance trains in the Western United States. The first permanent assignment, in October 1979, was to the Chicago–Seattle Empire Builder. Superliner II deliveries began in 1993, enabling Amtrak to retire aging Hi-Level cars and to use Superliners in trains in the Eastern United States—although tunnel clearances prevent their use on the Northeast Corridor.

== History ==
=== Background ===
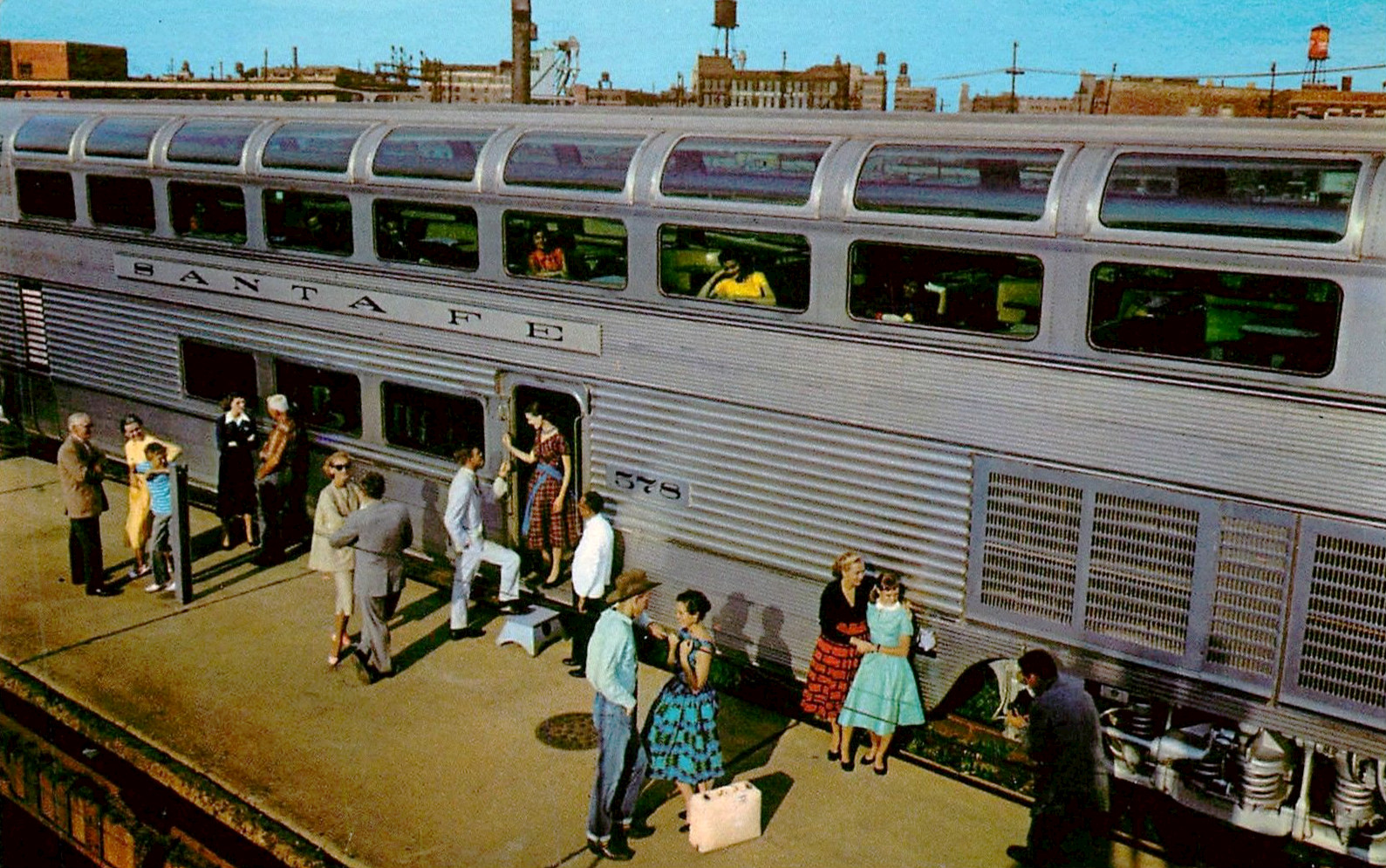
The exterior of a Hi-Level lounge on the El Capitan soon after completion in 1956

On May 1, 1971, Amtrak assumed control of almost all private-sector intercity passenger rail service in the United States, with a mandate to reverse decades of decline. It retained about 184 of the 440 trains that had run the day before. To operate these trains, Amtrak inherited a fleet of 300 locomotives and 1,190 passenger cars, most of which dated from the 1940s and 1950s. No new sleeping cars had been built for service in the United States since 1956.

Conventional single-level cars made up most of Amtrak's inherited fleet, but it also included 73 Hi-Level cars from the Santa Fe. The Budd Company built these between 1954 and 1964; the bilevel design, with its superior views and smooth riding characteristics, was well-suited to the long distances in the west. Michael R. Weinman, who worked at the design firm Louis T. Klauder & Associates, recalled that when Amtrak issued a request for proposal (RFP) in 1973 for a "totally new" passenger car, it "was assumed" that the design would be bilevel. Thirteen companies responded to the RFP; Amtrak selected the Klauder proposal. The design was finished by mid-1974 and Amtrak invited four companies to bid on its construction: Boeing, Budd, Pullman-Standard, and Rohr. Pullman-Standard won the contract.

=== Superliner I ===
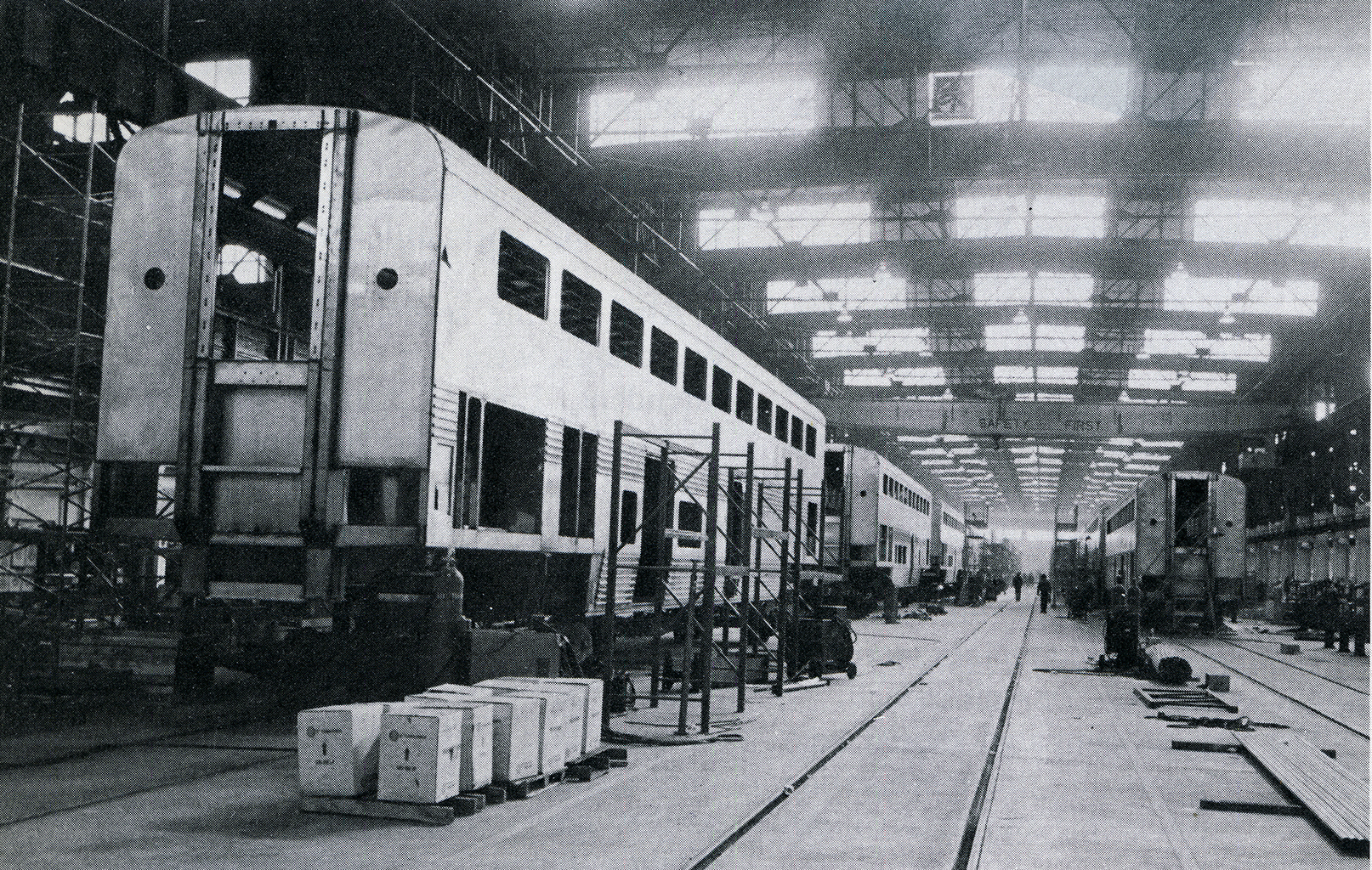
Superliners under construction at the Pullman plant in Hammond, Indiana

Amtrak ordered 235 Superliner I cars from Pullman-Standard on April 2, 1975, with deliveries scheduled for between January 1977 and June 1978. The order then consisted of 120 coaches, 55 sleepers, 34 diners, and 26 lounges. Amtrak soon increased the order to 284 cars: it added 30 coaches, 15 sleepers, 5 diners, and deleted 1 lounge. The initial order cost $143.6 million; with the additional cars and other payments the cost rose to $250 million.

The railroad asked its employees to name the new cars, and announced the winning entry in its internal newsletter of June 1, 1977: "Vistaliner", harkening back to the Vista-Domes of the Chicago, Burlington and Quincy Railroad. But the newsletter went on to note that the name was already under copyright by another company, and so the cars would be dubbed "Superliners", a name created by Needham, Harper & Steers, then Amtrak's advertising agency.

As the cars arrived in 1978 and 1979, Amtrak put them into use on short-haul routes radiating from Chicago. The first coaches entered regular service on February 26, 1979, running from Chicago to Milwaukee. The coaches, led by an EMD F40PH locomotive, displaced the regular Turboliner equipment. The equipment continued to operate on the run for several weeks. The Illini and Shawnee trains received Superliner coaches soon after; the first Superliner dining car ran on the Shawnee as a lounge. (Note: The Illini received Superliners in April and the Shawnee in June.)

=== Equipping the fleet ===
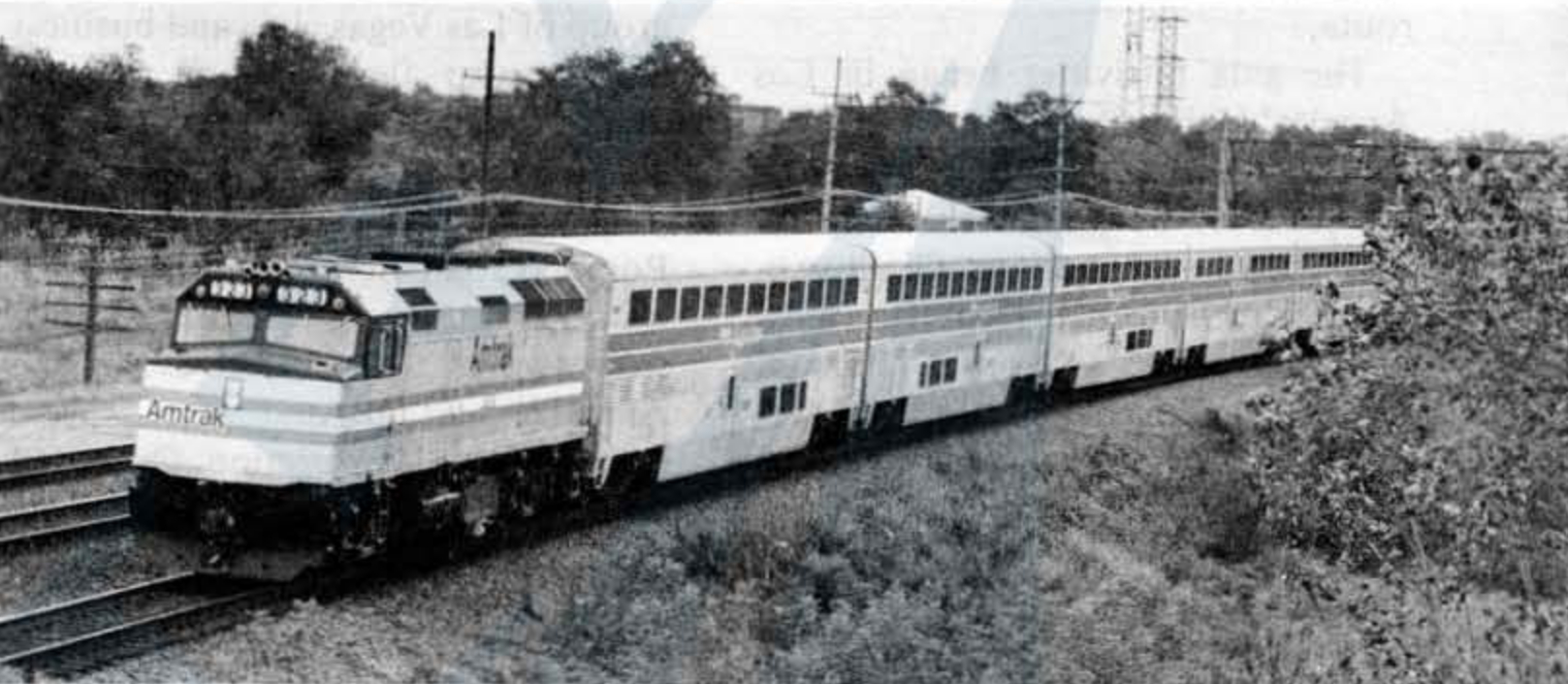
An Amtrak publicity train with Superliners at Lisle, Illinois, on October 11, 1979

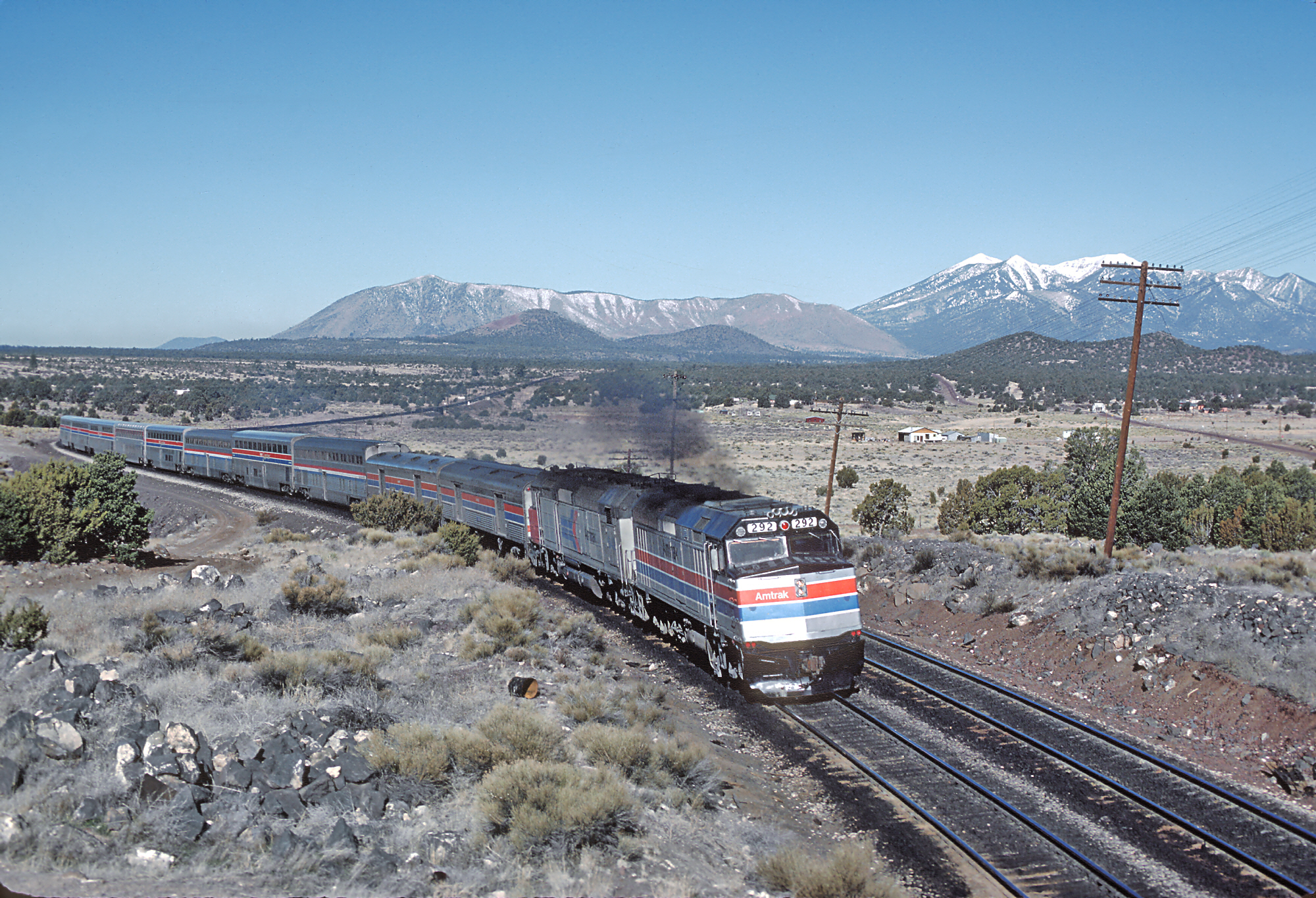
The Southwest Limited with a mix of Superliners and Hi-Level cars in March 1981

A public unveiling took place at Union Station in Chicago on October 11, 1979, followed by a short trip over the Burlington Northern Railroad to Lisle. The following day, the Shawnee had the dubious distinction of the first Superliner accident, a collision with an Illinois Central Gulf Railroad freight train at Harvey, IL, which claimed the lives of 2 crew members of the freight train.

Amtrak's first choice for Superliner assignments had been the financially troubled Floridian, a Chicago–Florida long-distance train, but the two years' delay in delivery scuppered these plans. Amtrak turned next to the Empire Builder. This long-distance train ran between Chicago and Seattle through the plains of Montana and North Dakota. Winters in that part of the United States are harsh, featuring both blizzards and cold temperatures. Traditional steam-heated equipment often broke down, causing Amtrak to cancel service. The Superliners, with their electrical head-end power, were far better suited for the conditions. The Empire Builder became the first long-distance train to use Superliners, and the first train permanently assigned them, on October 28, 1979. Amtrak's new national timetable depicted a Superliner coach on the front cover, and the listing for the Empire Builder carried a heading which read "Amtrak's Superliner is Somethin' Special." At the same time, Superliners entered service on the short-haul Pacific International and Mount Rainier in the Pacific Northwest.

With the Empire Builder in operation, Amtrak began re-equipping the remaining long-distance trains in the west. The second permanent Superliner train was the Desert Wind, then a day train between Los Angeles and Ogden, Utah, which gained coaches on June 30, 1980. The San Francisco Zephyr, a long-distance train on the traditional Overland Route between Chicago and San Francisco, followed on July 7, 1980; it received the first of the Sightseer lounges on January 6, 1981. Amtrak assigned Superliners to another long-distance train, the Los Angeles–Chicago Southwest Limited, in October 1980. The Southwest Limited, formerly the Super Chief, traveled the same route as the El Capitan, whose Hi-Level cars had inspired the design. The management of the Santa Fe, impressed by the design, permitted Amtrak to restore the name Chief to the train, and Amtrak renamed it the Southwest Chief on October 28, 1984. The Chief was the first train to receive Superliner II sleeping cars in September 1993.

The Coast Starlight began operating with Superliners in January 1981. The Sunset Limited, a long-distance train running along the southern border of the United States between Los Angeles and New Orleans, gained them in February, resulting in a commendation from the Texas State Legislature. The Pioneer gained Superliner coaches on April 26. The Eagle, an overnight train between San Antonio and Chicago, began carrying Superliners in October on those days it connected with the Sunset Limited in San Antonio. Superliner assignments became permanent in the 1990s. Amtrak estimated that reequipping a train with Superliners boosted ridership on it by 25%. The last car of the order, a sleeper delivered in July 1981, was also the last car ever built by Pullman, and was named in honor of the company's founder, George Mortimer Pullman.

In the mid-1980s, Canada's Via Rail contemplated replacing its aging Budd-built steam-heated cars with Superliners. The order would have consisted of 130 cars, valued at CA$450 million, to be built by a consortium of Bombardier Transportation and the Urban Transportation Development Corporation. Via tested several Amtrak Superliners in revenue service between Edmonton and Winnipeg in 1984–85. Ultimately Via chose to rebuild its Budd cars to use head end power (HEP) instead of ordering new equipment.

=== Superliner II ===
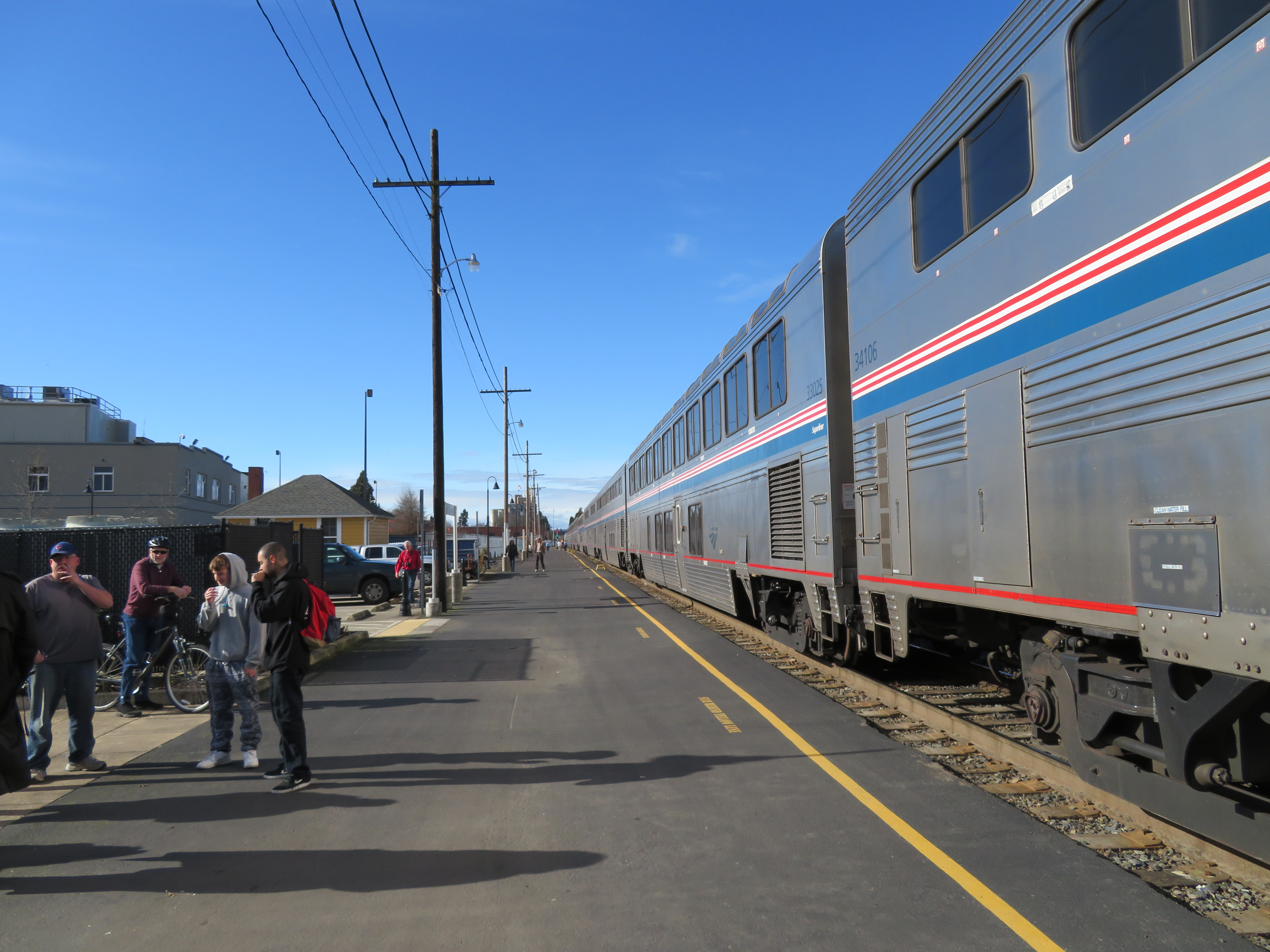
Superliner II cars on the Coast Starlight in 2018

Amtrak ordered 140 Superliner II cars from Bombardier Transportation in 1991; Bombardier had acquired the Superliner patents after Pullman-Standard's closure. The order consisted of 55 sleeping cars, 38 coaches, 20 dining cars, 15 lounges, and 12 transition-dormitory cars. The initial order cost $340 million. In late 1993 Amtrak exercised the option for 55 cars at a cost of $110 million, bringing the total order of Superliner II cars to 195. The option included ten dining cars, ten lounges, and 35 transdorms. Bombardier built the order in Barre, Vermont.

The new order allowed the displacement of the remaining Hi-Level cars as well as the employment of Superliners on trains running with single-level cars. Amtrak converted three eastern long-distance trains to Superliners: the Chicago–New Orleans City of New Orleans (March 1994); the Chicago–Washington, D.C. Capitol Limited (October); and the Virginia–Florida Auto Train (March 1, 1995). A project to enlarge the First Street Tunnel in Washington, D.C., enabled the Chicago–Washington Cardinal to begin using Superliners in September 1995; these were withdrawn in 2002 because of equipment shortages. Superliners were used on the Chicago–Toronto International from November 1995 until early 2000. (Note: Sanders cites an equipment shortage for the withdrawal. A report published by the Transportation Safety Board of Canada in 2002 faulted the design of the wheelchair-accessible bathroom in the Superliner and indicated that they were withdrawn for that reason.) In 2017, Amtrak identified a need to replace the Superliners, noting that each car traveled the equivalent of "seven trips around the world" every year. In November 2024, the Capitol Limited was replaced by the Floridian which uses Viewliner, not Superliner, equipment.

=== Future cars ===
In 2022, Amtrak announced that they would be replacing all of their current Superliner, Amfleet, and Viewliner I passenger cars by 2032. Amtrak issued a request for information from ten manufacturers in December 2022, followed by a formal request for proposals in December 2023.

== Design ==
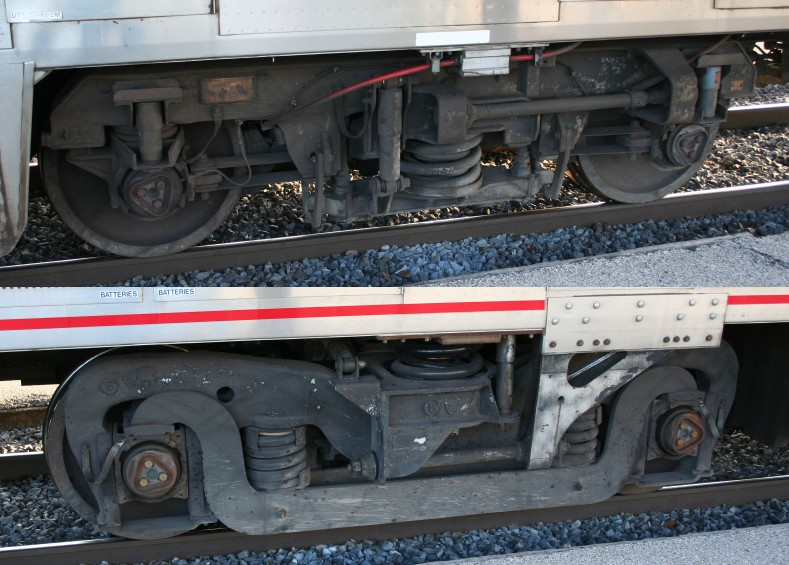
Top: Waggon Union truck from Superliner I. Bottom: GSI truck from Superliner II.

The Superliners generally resembled the Hi-Level design, though at 16 feet 2 inches (4.9 m), they were 8 inches (20 cm) taller. The Superliners also used Amtrak's new 480-volt head-end power for heating and electricity. This was more reliable than the steam heat used by the Hi-Levels, whose own heaters and diesel generators would eventually be replaced by HEP equipment.

Initially, the cars could not be worked east of Chicago because of limited overhead clearances, but by the 1980s, many eastern railroads had raised clearances on their tracks to permit tri-level auto carriers and double-stack container trains, which also permitted the operation of the Superliners. To this day, inadequate tunnel clearances in and around New York City and Baltimore prevent the use of Superliners on Amtrak's busiest line, the Northeast Corridor.

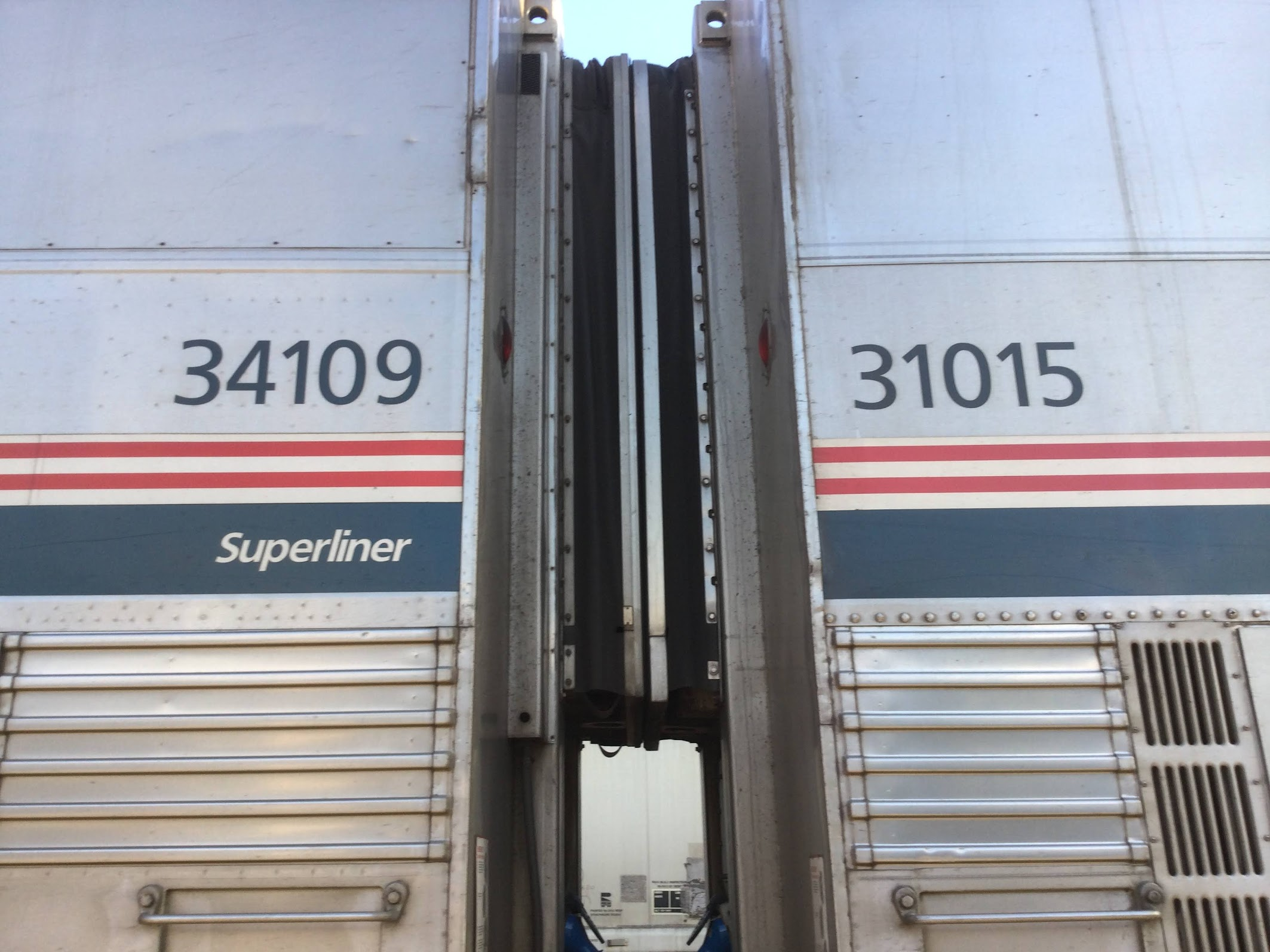
Diaphragm connecting two Amtrak Superliner cars. Only the upper levels of the cars connect.

The Superliner I cars ride on Waggon Union MD-76 trucks, which require more frequent overhauls than comparable domestic designs and are "notorious for their rough riding characteristics". The Superliner IIs ride on GSI-G70 outboard bearing trucks, also found on the Horizon single-level cars. Both models have a maximum speed of 100 mph (161 km/h). (Note: Bombardier's specification for the Superliner II indicates a maximum design speed of 120 mph (193 km/h).)

The Superliner I cars originally stored waste in tanks, then macerated and dumped it along the tracks once the train had attained a preset speed. This was an improvement on the Hi-Levels, which dumped directly to the tracks. Growing public concern about such dumping led Amtrak to order its Superliner IIs with a full-retention system. The Superliner I cars were retrofitted with a full-retention system in the early 1990s.

The New York Times described the Superliner I interior color scheme as "soft hues of beige, rust, brown and green". For the Superliner IIs, Amtrak introduced a new scheme incorporating gray, aquamarine, and salmon.

=== Coaches ===
Pullman-Standard built 102 Superliner I coaches and 48 coach-baggage combine cars. Bombardier built 38 Superliner II coaches. As built, Superliner coaches could carry 62 passengers in the upper level and 15 passengers on the lower level. The lower level's capacity would later be reduced to 12. The coach-baggage cars had a baggage compartment in lieu of the lower-level seating area, and squeezed 78 seats into the upper level. The total capacity of 75 to 78 represented a small increase over the 68 to 72 seats on the Hi-Level coaches, which lacked seating on the lower level. The Superliner I coach weighs 157,000 pounds (71,214 kg); the Superliner II coach weighs 151,235 pounds (68,599 kg).

Seating on the upper and lower levels is 2×2 with reclining seats. The seats are 23 inches (58 cm) wide with a pitch of 50–52 inches (127–132 cm). Included are adjustable footrests and retractable legrests, but no center armrest. There are overhead luggage racks on the upper level and a luggage storage area on the lower level across from the stairs. There are four unisex toilets per coach, all on the lower level. A shower was included in the original design, to be locked when the coaches were used in short-haul service, but deleted from the final design. After a grade crossing accident in 1999, the Transportation Safety Board of Canada faulted the layout on the lower level; the exterior door, when opened and locked in position, prevented egress from the wheelchair-accessible bathroom.

Two-piece windows are located at each seat row. Each window is 24 by 66 inches (61 by 168 cm). Integral blinds were rejected in favor of curtains on maintenance grounds, while an upper level of "skylight" windows, similar to those on the Sun Lounge cars, was rejected as too expensive. Full-height windows were incorporated into the lounge cars.

Eleven Superliner I coaches were rebuilt as "snack coaches". These retained the 62 seats on the upper level but removed the lower-level seating in favor of a snack bar and lounge seats.

Amtrak rebuilt 34 of the coach-baggage cars as "smoking coaches" in 1996 and 1997. The baggage room was converted to a self-contained specially ventilated smoking lounge. After Amtrak banned smoking on long-distance trains in 2004, (Note: Except for Auto Train, which did so in 2013.) the cars were reconverted.

Five Superliner II coaches were rebuilt in 1996 and 1997 as "family coaches" or "Kiddie Cars". These cars featured a children's play area on the lower level instead of seating and were assigned to the Coast Starlight, a long-distance train between Los Angeles and Seattle along the West Coast of the United States. Amtrak rebuilt these five cars again in 2008 and 2009 as "arcade cars" with video game machines in the lower level. The cars were converted once more in 2015 to provide business class service on the Coast Starlight. The service began in June 2015.

Caltrans paid to rebuild six Superliner I coaches and one baggage-coach, which had been wrecked in various accidents, for use in Amtrak California service. The seating capacity was increased to 76 on the upper level and 20 on the lower level.

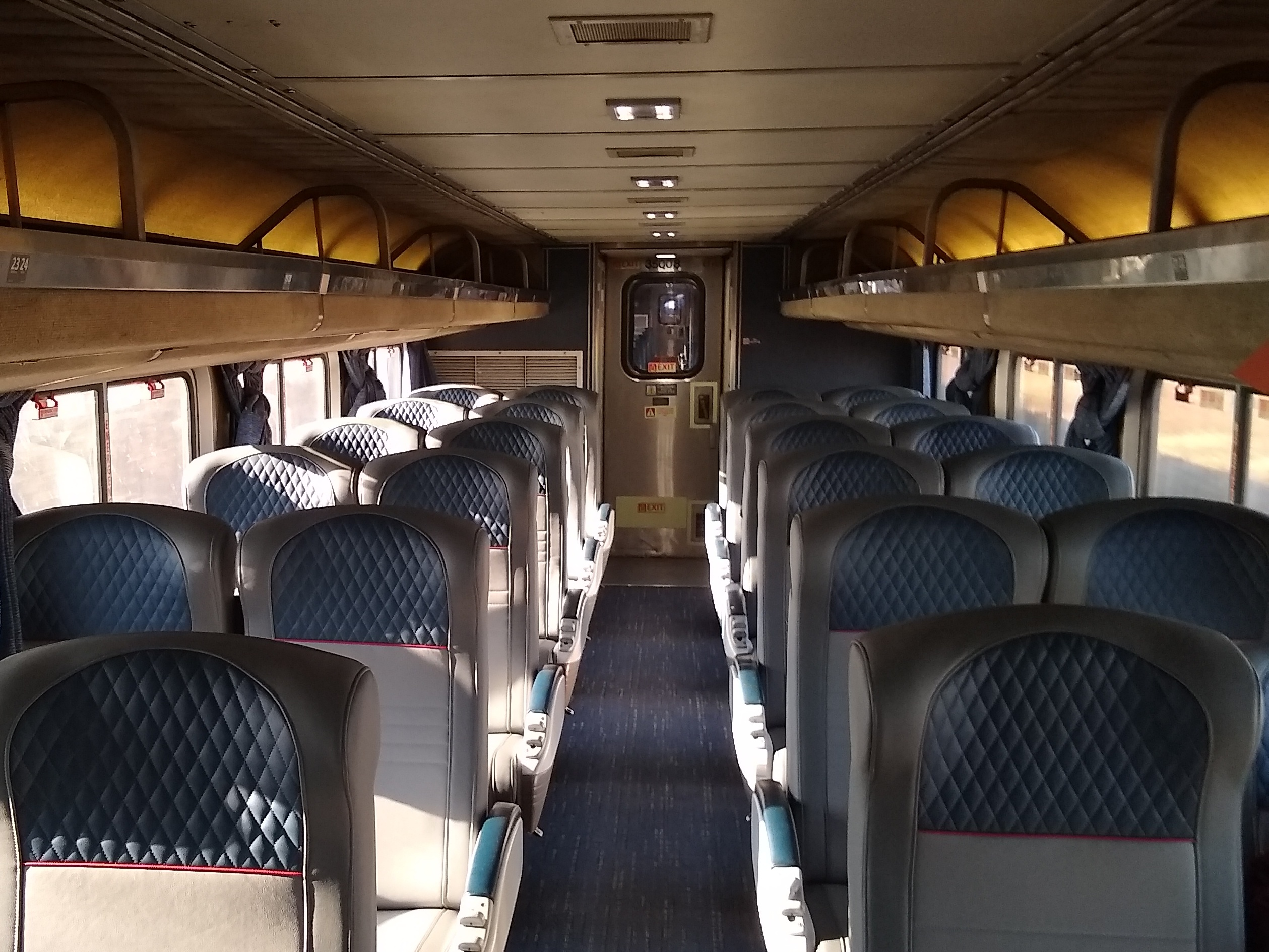
The interior of the upper level of Superliner I coach No. 35008

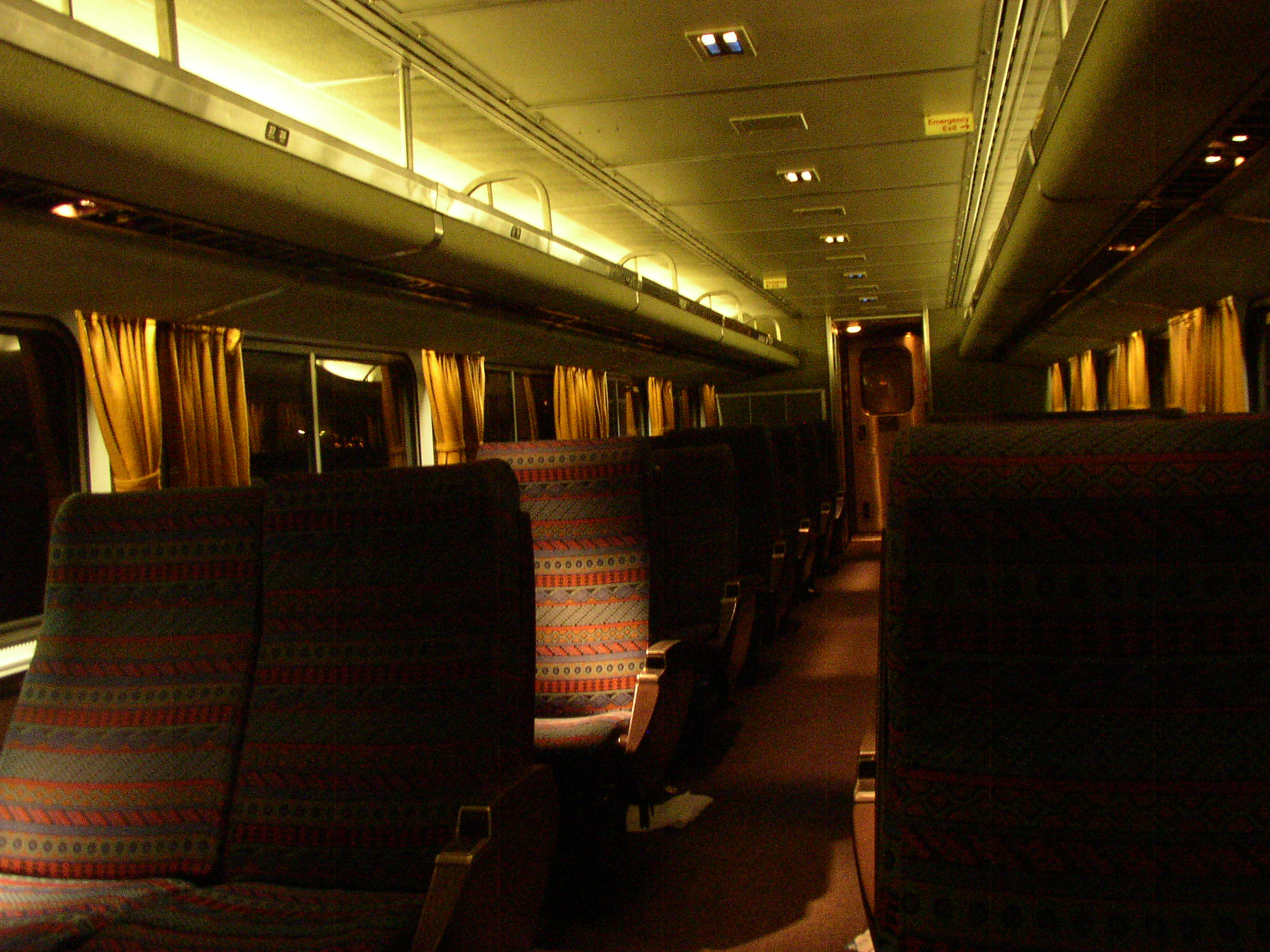
Superliner Coach interior in the factory original configuration, seen in 2004 on the Texas Eagle

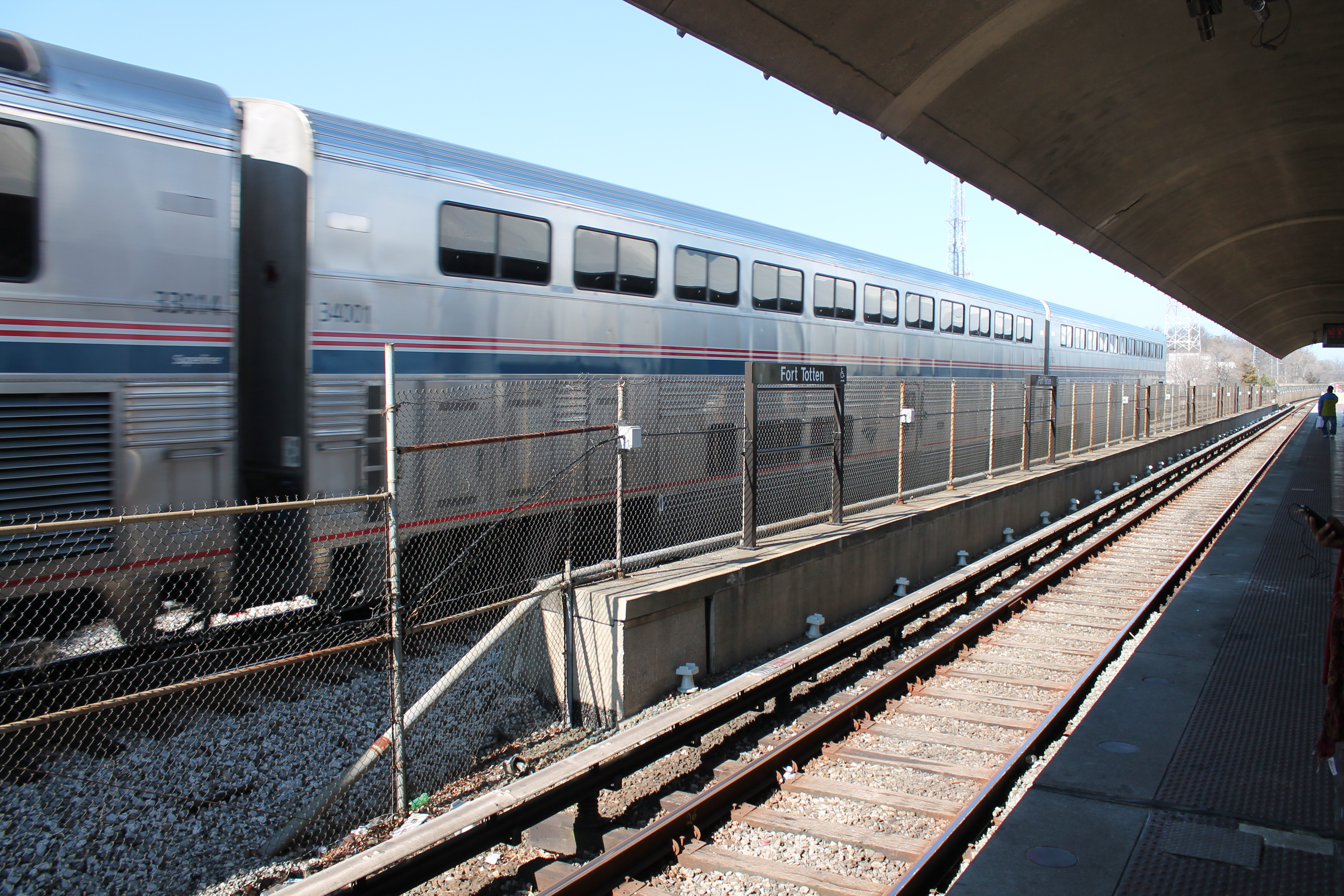
The Superliner I coach has a full row of windows along the upper-level seating area.

=== Sleeping cars ===
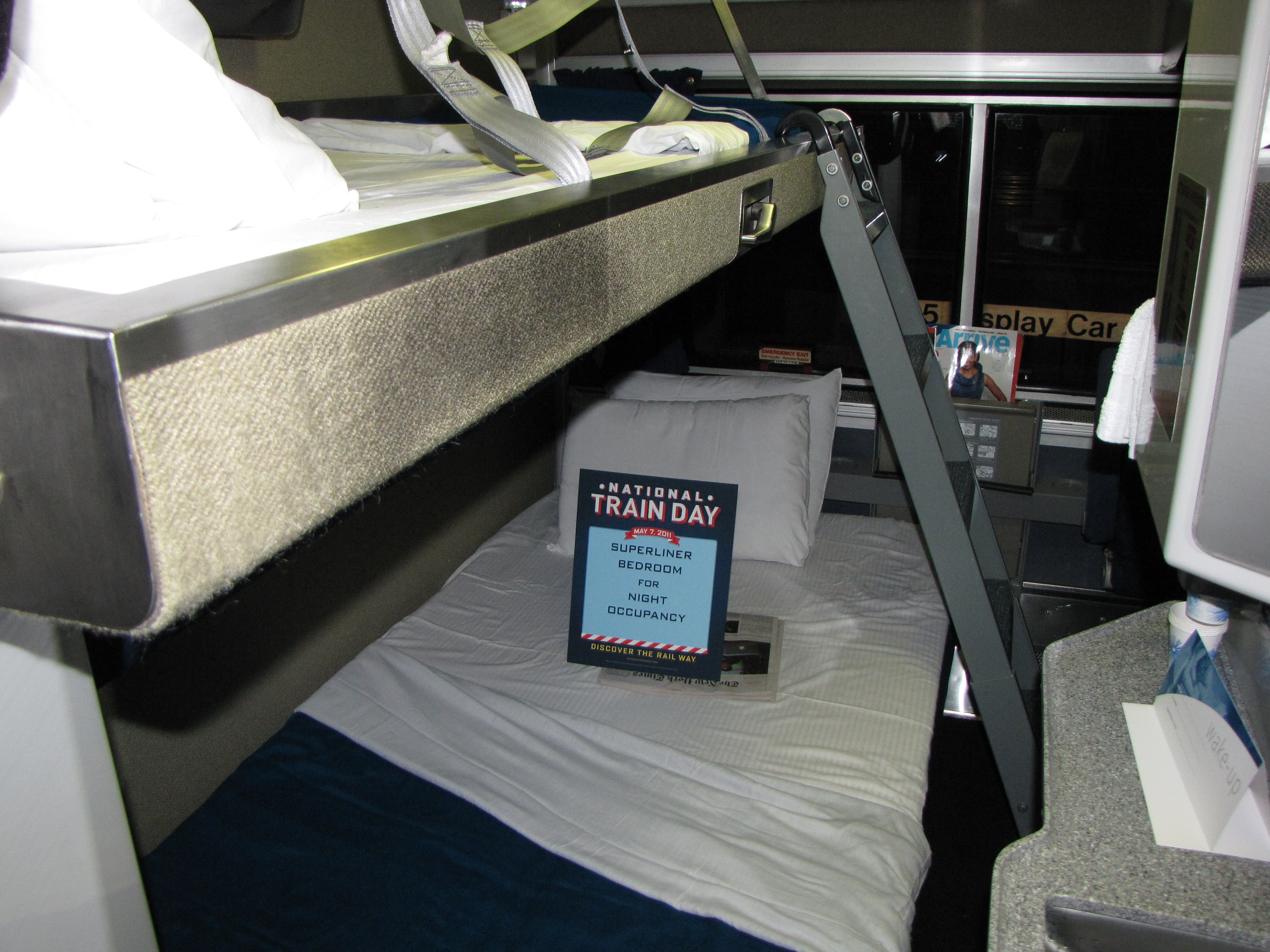
A Superliner bedroom in nighttime configuration

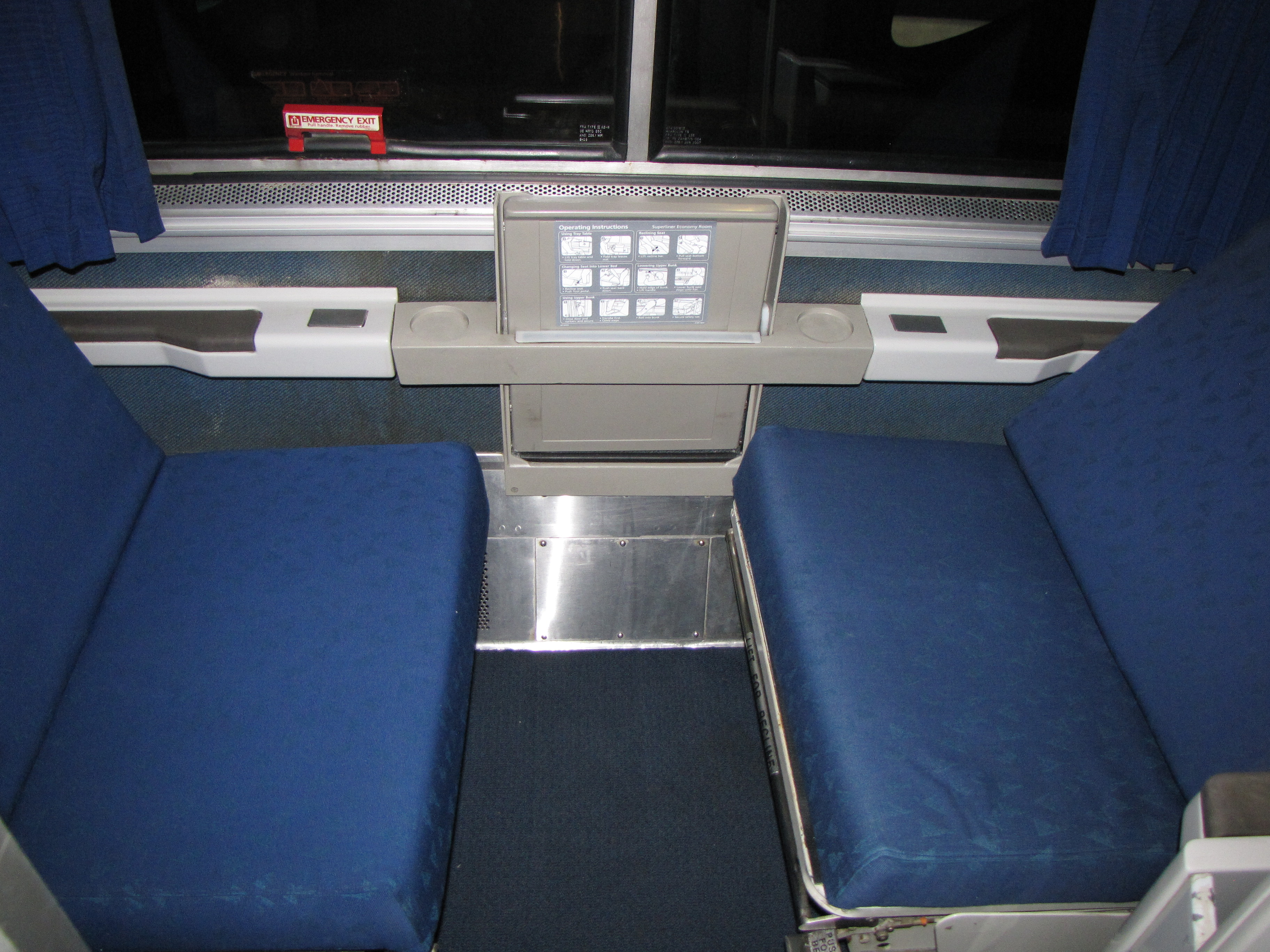
A Superliner roomette in daytime configuration

Pullman-Standard built 70 Superliner I sleeping cars; Bombardier built 49 "standard" Superliner II sleepers and six "deluxe" sleepers. The standard Superliner sleeping car contains 14 roomettes, five bedrooms, a family bedroom, and an accessible bedroom. The deluxe sleeping car contains ten bedrooms, four roomettes, a family bedroom, and an accessible bedroom. As built, the standard sleeping car could hold a maximum of 44 passengers. The Superliner I sleeping car weighs 167,000 pounds (75,750 kg); the Superliner II sleeping car weighs 160,275 pounds (72,700 kg). The Superliner II deluxe sleeper is slightly heavier at 161,375 pounds (73,198 kg).

Roomettes measure 3 feet 6 inches (107 cm) × 6 feet 6 inches (198 cm). In daytime configuration each features two facing seats; these are combined to form a bed. A second bed is folded down from the ceiling. Bedrooms measure 6 feet 6 inches (198 cm) × 7 feet 6 inches (229 cm). Like the roomette, there are two berths; during the day the lower berth acts as a sofa. The room also contains a chair which faces the beds. Unlike the roomette, a bedroom includes a private combination toilet/shower, and a private sink.

The family bedroom is located at one end of the car's lower level and measures 5 feet 2 inches (157 cm) × 9 feet 5 inches (287 cm). It can hold up to two adults and two children in four berths. During the day the berths form a sofa and two seats. At the opposite end of the car from the family bedroom is the accessible bedroom, which measures 6 feet 9 inches (206 cm) × 9 feet 5 inches (287 cm). It sleeps two people in two berths and includes a wheelchair-accessible toilet, but no shower.

The standard sleeping car has five bedrooms and ten roomettes on the upper level. The bedrooms are set against one side of the car with a hallway along the edge, while the roomettes are located to each side with the hallway running down the centerline. At the center of the car are the stairs to the lower level and a bathroom. A hallway runs through the centerline of the lower level with the accessible bedroom at one end and the family bedroom at the other. To one side of the stairs are three bathrooms and one shower, and to the other are four more roomettes. Luggage racks are located opposite the stairs. The layout of the deluxe sleeping car is similar. There are ten bedrooms on the upper level with a continuous hallway along one edge. The lower level contains opposed family and accessible bedrooms, four toilets, four roomettes, and a luggage rack. Two bedrooms may be combined to form a "bedroom suite".

As delivered, the Superliner I sleeping cars had five bathrooms, all on the lower level, and no public shower. Roomettes were termed "economy bedrooms" and bedrooms "deluxe bedrooms". During the 1980s, Amtrak retrofitted the cars to add a bathroom on the upper level and a public shower on the lower level, at the expense of one bathroom. The Superliner II cars incorporated these improvements into their design.

Amtrak announced in 2025 that with the introduction of the Phase VII livery, names will be reintroduced on First Class Sleeper cars. As delivered, the Superliner II cars were named after states. The Superliner I cars will be named after national parks.

=== Lounges ===
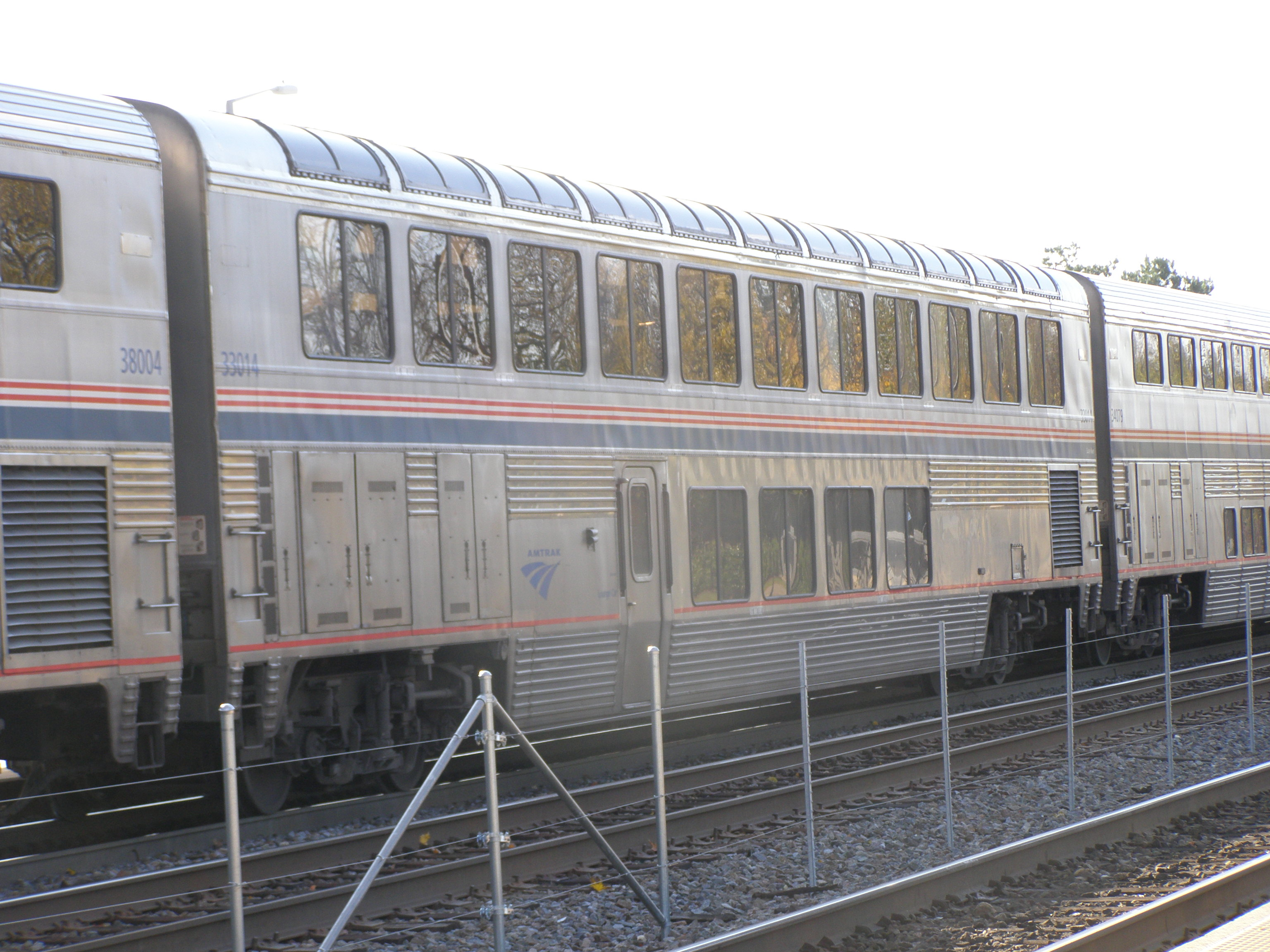
The Superliner lounge cars have windows that curve over parts of the ceiling.

Pullman-Standard and Bombardier each built 25 dedicated lounge cars, dubbed "Sightseer" lounges. Windows wrap upward into the ceiling, providing lateral views of scenery along the train's route. This design element was drawn from the Hi-Level lounges and the Seaboard Air Line's Sun Lounges. The Superliner I lounge weighs 160,000 pounds (72,575 kg); the Superliner II lounge weighs 151,235 pounds (68,599 kg).

The upper level contains a mix of seating options. At one end are eight tables, four to each side, each seating four passengers. In the center is a lounge area with a wet bar and several groups of seats. The stairs to the lower level are located here as well. At the other end are swivel chairs. The lower level contains a bathroom, additional tables, and a café. As built, the lounges had seating for 73. The cars were built with an electric piano in the lower level, which has since been removed.

In addition to the Sightseer lounges, Amtrak converted five Superliner I dining cars to lounge cars in 1998 for use on the Auto Train, an automobile-carrying overnight train between Virginia and Florida. These cars may be distinguished from the Sightseer lounges by their conventional windows.

=== Dining cars ===
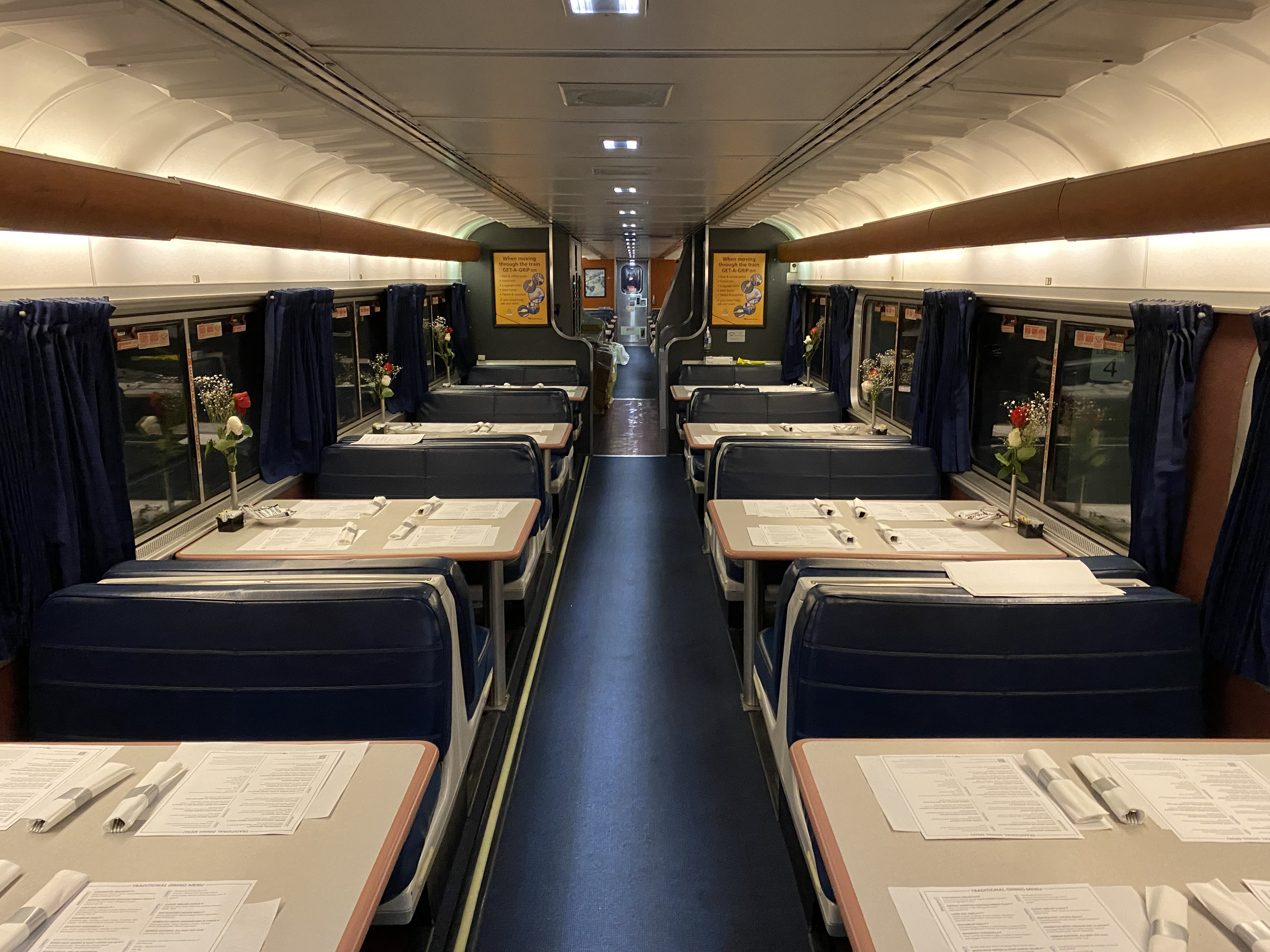
A Superliner dining car on the Southwest Chief in 2022

Pullman-Standard built 30 dining cars; Bombardier built another 39. The dining cars can seat a maximum of 72 people on the upper level in tables of four. The galley occupies the entire lower level. At the center of the car are stairs down to the kitchen. A dumbwaiter is used to bring food and drink to the dining level, as well as to return dishes, glasses, and cutlery for washing. A late 2010s overhaul added a refrigerator on the upper level for easy access and replaced incandescent lights with LED lighting. As built, the Superliner I dining car weighs 174,000 pounds (78,925 kg); the Superliner II dining car weighs 158,070 pounds (71,699 kg).

Amtrak rebuilt 17 Superliner I dining cars as diner-lounges in the late 2000s. Dubbed the "Cross-Country Cafe", they were intended to reduce food service losses by replacing both a traditional dining car and the Sightseer lounge on long-distance trains. One end of the car was converted into a café area, with tables and a small serving area near the stairs to the kitchen. The other side remained dedicated to traditional diner seating, but the standard two-by-two tables were replaced by booths.

=== Transition sleepers ===
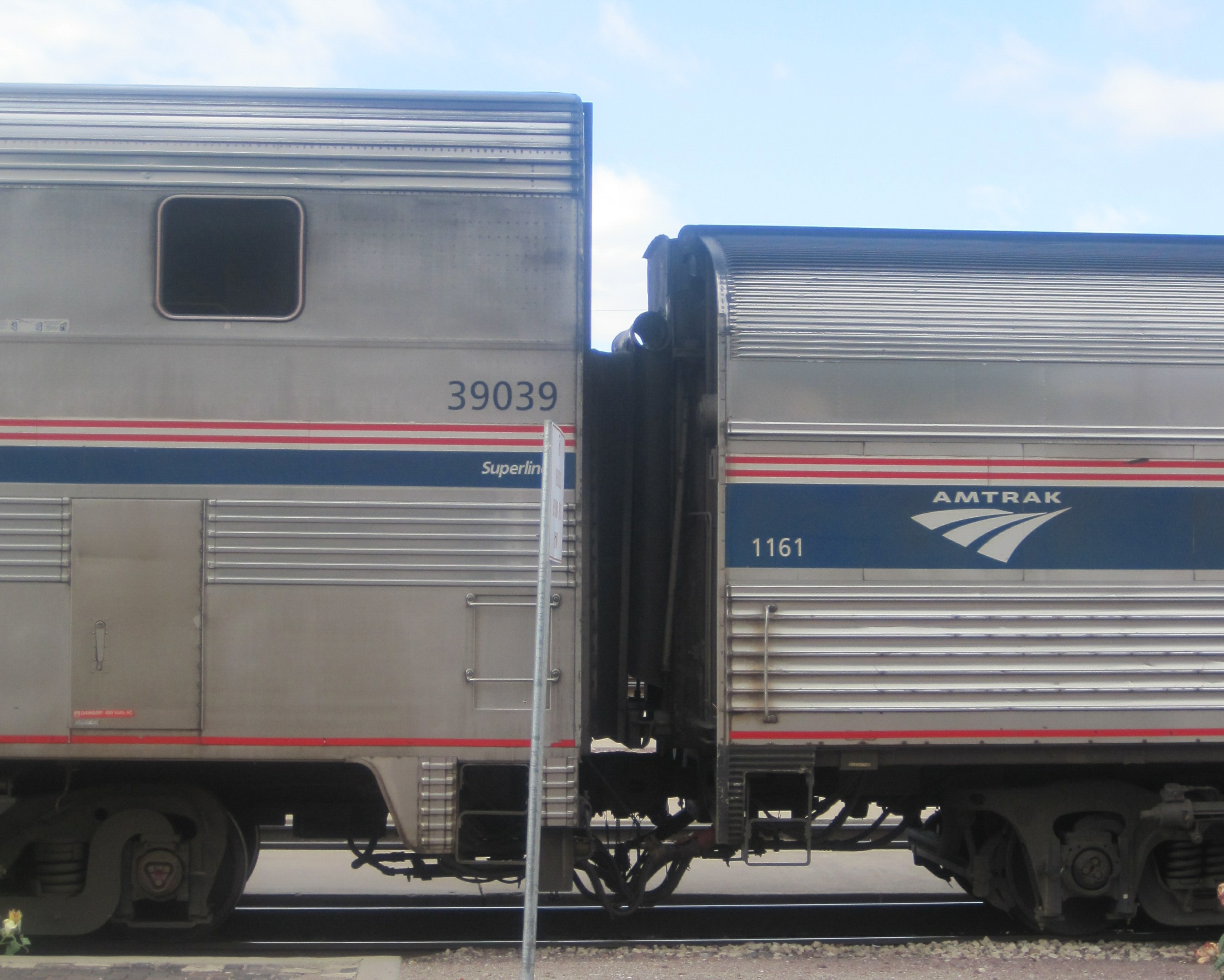
A Superliner II transition sleeper with the lower-level connection to a baggage car

As part of the Superliner II order, Bombardier built 47 "transition sleeper" or dormitory cars. The car had two purposes: to provide sleeping accommodations for train personnel; and to provide access to single level equipment from bilevel Superliner and Hi-Level cars. Hi-Level "step-down" coaches previously performed the latter role. Most transition dormitory ("transdorm") cars have 16 roomettes on the upper level for crew accommodations, with an accessible bedroom and small crew lounge on the lower level. Bathrooms and showers are located on both levels. At one end of the car is a top level end-door; at the other end is a staircase and end door on the lower level. On some trains, Amtrak makes the roomettes closest to the upper level end door available for sale to passengers. The transition sleepers weigh 156,085 pounds (70,799 kg).

=== Summary ===
Between them Pullman-Standard and Bombardier manufactured 479 cars (284 for Pullman and 195 for Bombardier):

Builder	Class	Type	Quantity	Original road numbers
Pullman-Standard	Superliner I	Coach-baggage	48	31000–31047
Pullman-Standard	Superliner I	Sleeper	70	32000–32069
Bombardier	Superliner II	Sleeper	49	32070–32118
Bombardier	Superliner II	Deluxe sleeper	6	32500–32505
Pullman-Standard	Superliner I	Sightseer lounge	25	33000–33024
Bombardier	Superliner II	Sightseer lounge	25	33025–33049
Pullman-Standard	Superliner I	Coach	102	34000–34101
Bombardier	Superliner II	Coach	38	34102–34139
Pullman-Standard	Superliner I	Diner	39	38000–38038
Bombardier	Superliner II	Diner	30	38039–38068
Bombardier	Superliner II	Transition sleeper	47	39000–39046

== Derivatives ==
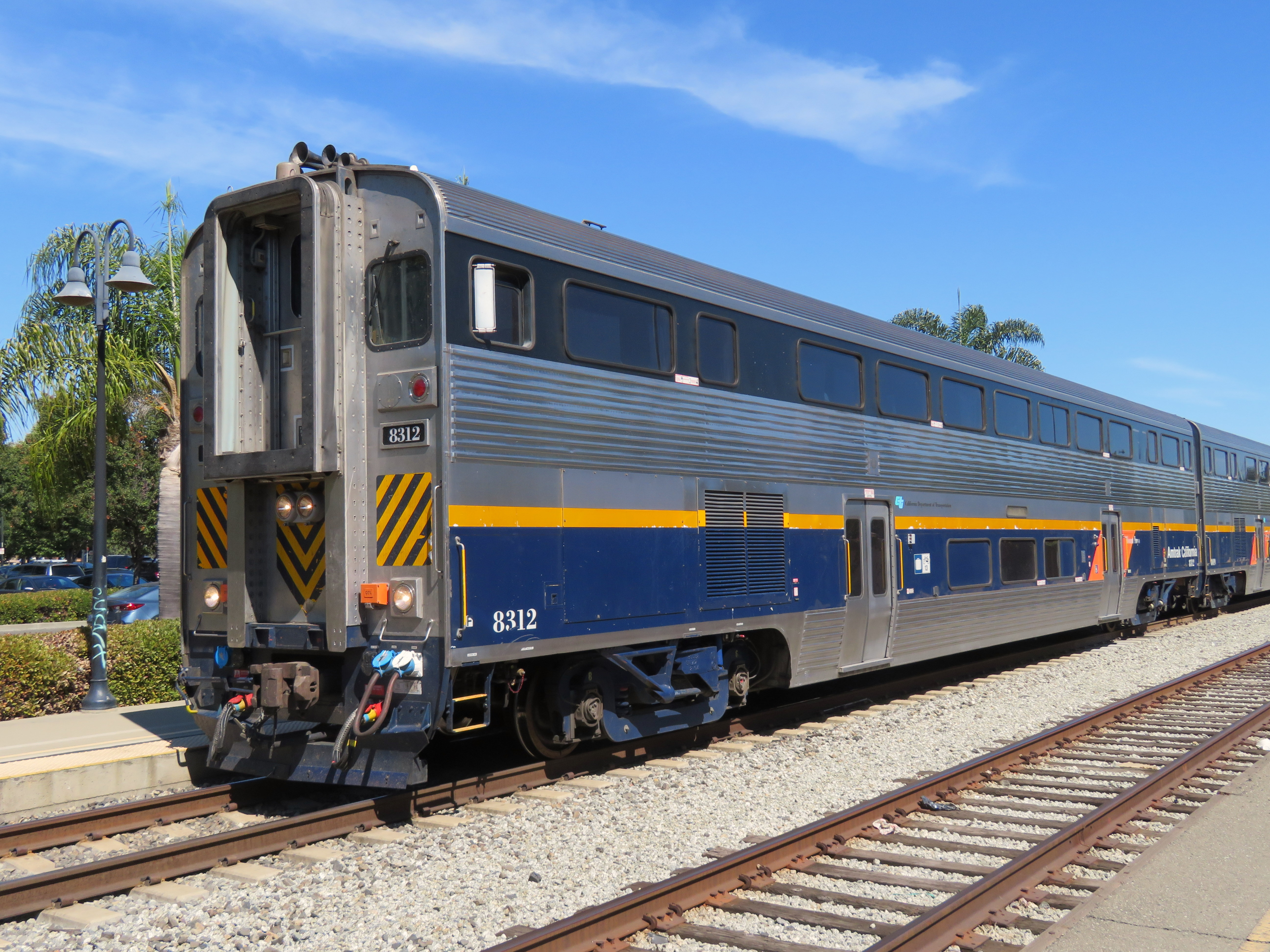
California Cars were the first generation of Superliner derivatives.

The Superliners established a standard basic design for bilevel railcars, including the upper-floor height of 104.5 inches (2.65 m) above the top of rail. Built primarily for long-distance services, the Superliners were not ideal for use on corridor routes. They were not equipped for the volumes of passenger loading and unloading found on corridor routes, nor did they have amenities designed for these shorter trips. The 1990 passage of California propositions 108, 111 and 116 authorized the sale of nearly $3 billion in bonds for the creation of rail services across the state. Proposition 116 required Caltrans to create specifications for standardized railcars and locomotives that would be suitable for rail operations across the state.

The resulting California Car design, of which 66 were built by Morrison Knudsen from 1994 to 1997, offered a number of improvements on the Superliner design. The single vestibule and bent staircase of the Superliner design were replaced with two vestibules and two straight staircases to facilitate faster loading and unloading. The trainline-controlled power doors do not require a crew member at every door, thus reducing crew size requirements. The California Cars comply with the Americans with Disabilities Act of 1990, with wheelchair lifts and accessible seating on the lower levels. Fourteen of the cars were built as cab cars, allowing push-pull operations rather than turning the whole train or moving the locomotive at terminals.

The success of the California Cars resulted in the procurement of the Surfliner cars by Amtrak and Caltrans in 1998. Alstom built 62 Surfliners from 2000 to 2002. The Surfliner is a modification of the California Car, with design changes including an improved accessible bathroom design and passenger amenities such as electric outlets. Surfliners and California Cars are mechanically and electrically compatible with each other and the Superliners, and they often are combined in trainsets on Amtrak California services.

Caltrans and Amtrak began drafting the specification for a third generation of the design in 2006. This specification, dubbed "Corridor Car for the 21st Century" or C21, became the basis for the design work undertaken by the Next Generation Corridor Equipment Pool Committee (NGCE) under the provisions of the Passenger Rail Investment and Improvement Act of 2008 beginning in 2009. Caltrans and the Illinois Department of Transportation ordered 130 of these Next Generation Bi-Level Passenger Rail Cars from Sumitomo (with Nippon Sharyo as the builder) in 2012. In August 2015, a new car shell failed a buff strength compression test. Increasing the buff strength would require a complete redesign of the car, and would delay delivery beyond the expiration of a $220 million American Recovery and Reinvestment Act of 2009 (ARRA) grant that funded the order. In November 2017, Sumitomo cancelled their order of bilevel cars with Nippon Sharyo, and instead contracted with Siemens Mobility to build 137 single-level Siemens Venture cars based on the European Siemens Viaggio Comfort cars instead of the bilevel cars.
