= Surfliner (railcar) =

American intercity railcar family

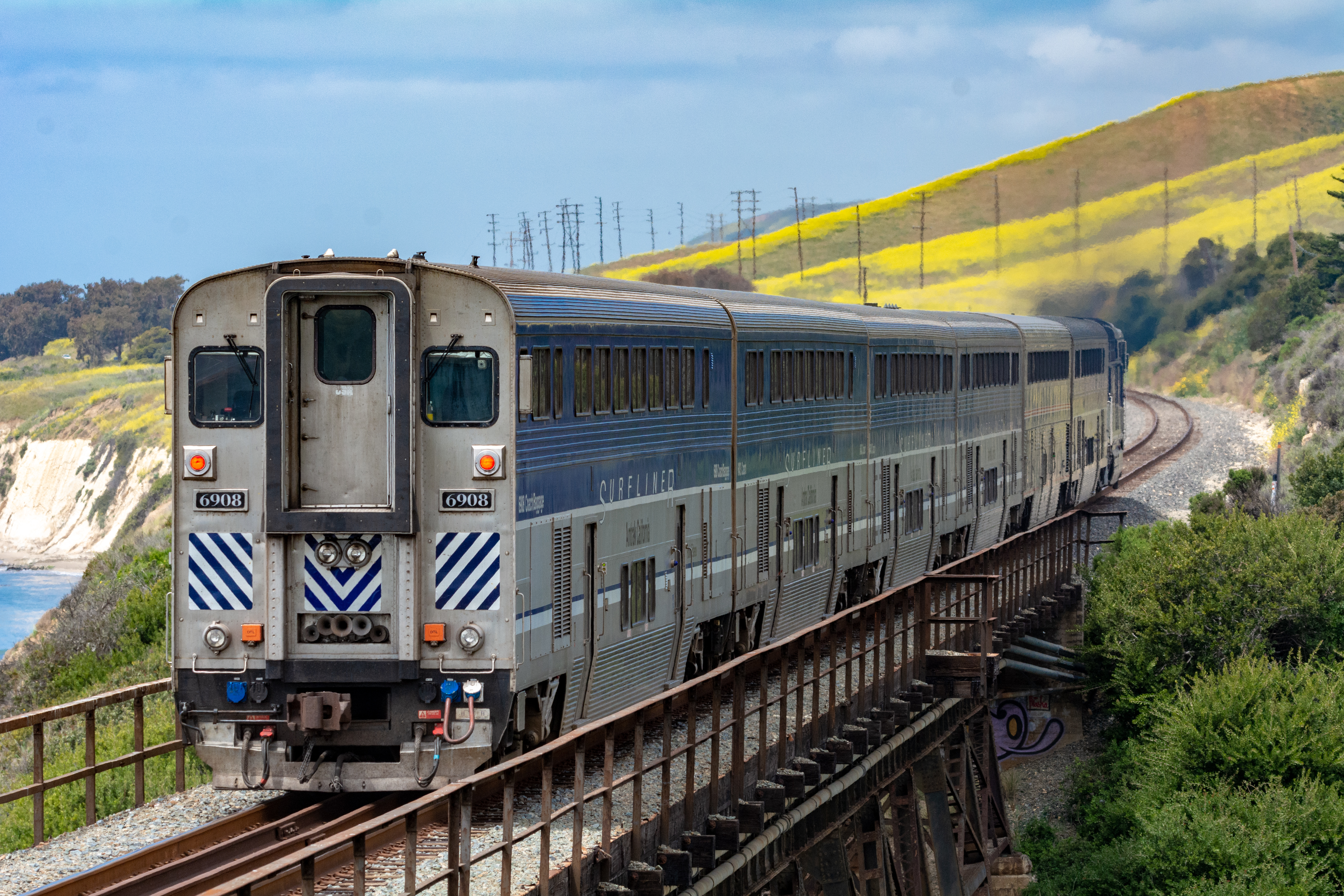
- Surfliner coach/baggage/cab car 6908 trailing on the Pacific Surfliner

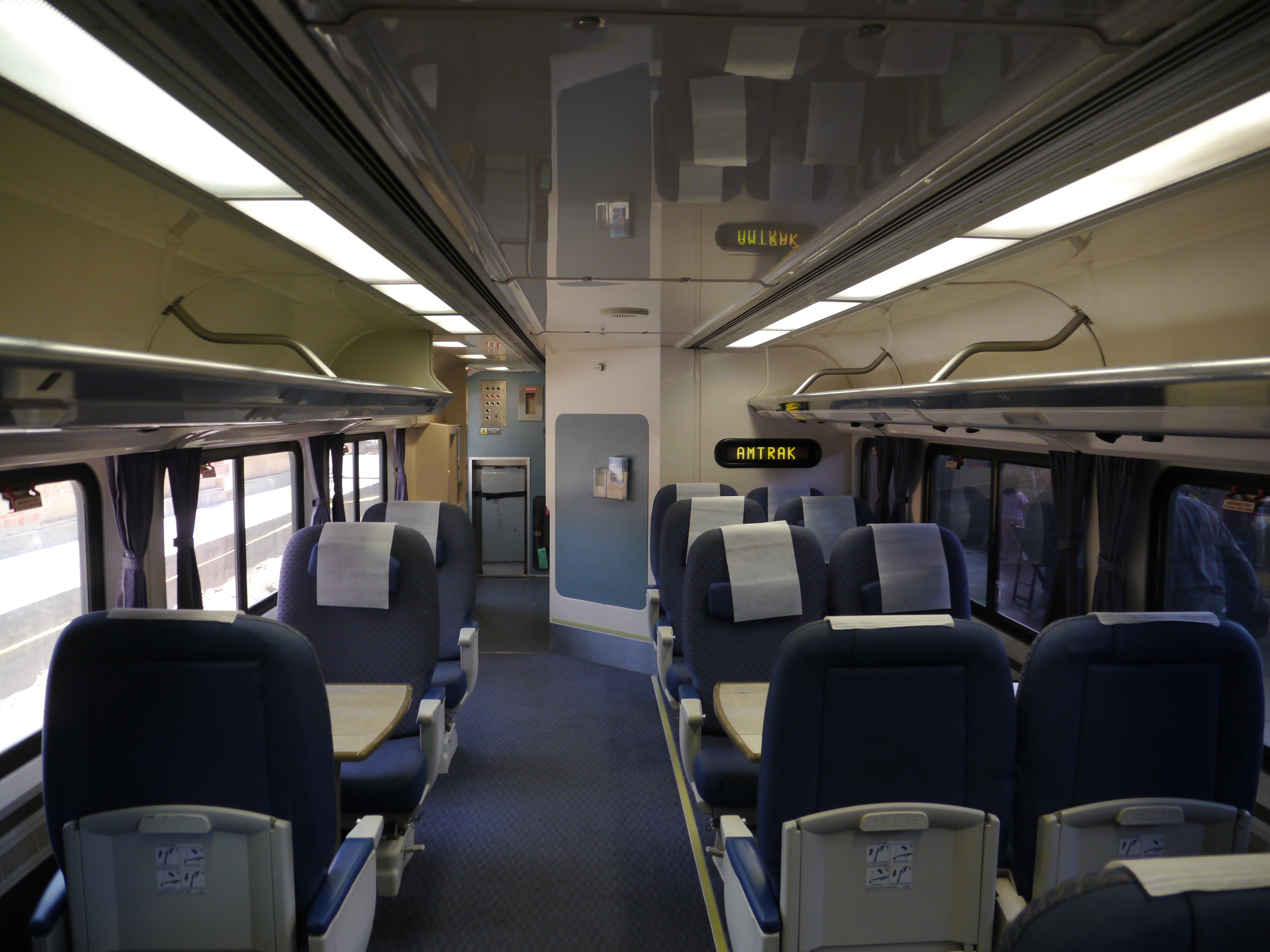
- Lower level accessible seating area of a Surfliner car
- Manufacturer: Alstom
- Built at: Hornell, New York
- Family name: Superliner
- Constructed: 1998–2002
- Number built: 62
- Formation: single car
- Fleet numbers: 6000 series
- Capacity: 90 passengers (coach cars)
- Operators: Amtrak & Caltrans as Amtrak California
- Depots: Los Angeles, Oakland
- Lines served: Pacific Surfliner, Capitol Corridor, Gold Runner

Specifications
- Car length: 85 ft 0 in (25.91 m)
- Width: 10 ft 2 in (3.10 m)
- Height: 16 ft 2 in (4.93 m)
- Entry: Step
- Doors: 2 sets of bi-parting automatic doors per side
- Maximum speed: 110 miles per hour (177 km/h)
- Power supply: 480 V AC 60 Hz Head end power
- Bogies: GSI 70
- Braking system: Air
- Coupling system: AAR
- Track gauge: 4 ft 8 1/2 in (1,435 mm)

The Surfliner is a family of bi-level intercity railcars derived from the California Car. Like its predecessor, it is derived from the Superliner in design, and operated on Amtrak California's intercity routes in California. They are owned by both Amtrak and the California Department of Transportation (Caltrans).

Alstom delivered the first order of cars for Amtrak between 2000 and 2001. A second order for the Caltrans Division of Rail was delivered in 2002. While based on the Superliner, several changes were made to the design to make the car more suitable for corridor services with frequent stops.

== History ==
After the problematic delivery of the California Car in 1996, Amtrak set out to create a more advanced and reliable second-generation intercity car for use on the busy San Diegan route (which was re-branded as the Pacific Surfliner when these cars were delivered). Several design changes were made to the cars including moving one of the restrooms to the upper level, adding a power outlet at every seat pair, moving the checked baggage compartment into the lower level of the cab car and creating a smaller galley on the lower level of the café car, enabling the upper level to be used for revenue seating.

In February 1998, Amtrak ordered 40 Surfliner cars that were delivered by Alstom between 2000 and 2001 (all numbered in the 6xxx series). The first cars started operating on the Pacific Surfliner in April 2000.

In September 1999, Caltrans placed a smaller order for 22 cars. 10 cars (numbered in the 6x5x series) were used to supplement the Amtrak-owned cars on the Pacific Surfliner and the other 12 (numbered in the 6x6x series) were used to expand the fleet used on the Capitol Corridor and San Joaquin. These were the final Surfliner cars to be built and delivery was completed in 2002.

== Description ==
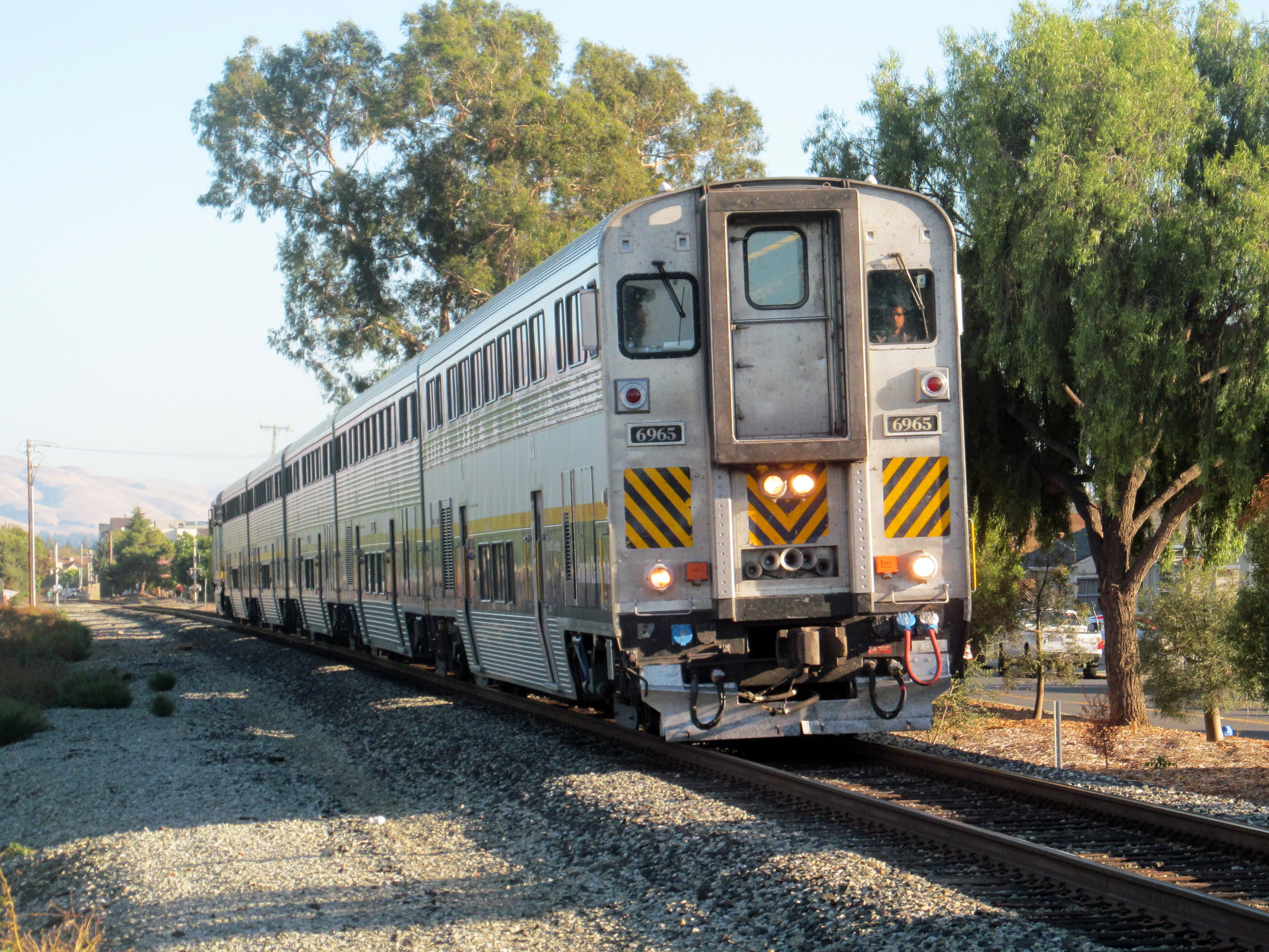
A Surfliner coach/baggage/cab car leading the Capitol Corridor in Union City, California

Surfliner cars were delivered in several types: coach cars, café/coach cars equipped for food sales on the lower level, business-class cars which have two small galleys to allow an attendant to offer complimentary beverage service, and coach/baggage/cab cars equipped with coach seating, a checked baggage space on the lower level, and engineer's operating cab and headlights on one end, allowing the train to be operated in push-pull mode. All Surfliner cars are equipped with overhead luggage racks, reclining seats with tray tables and footrests, reading lights, restrooms, AmtrakConnect WiFi, 120 V power outlets, and a wheelchair ramp. The Surfliner has a maximum speed of 90 mph (145 km/h).

== See also ==
- California Car (railcar) – The first generation of Superliner derived bi-level intercity railcars.
- Next Generation Bi-Level Passenger Rail Car – Cancelled third generation of Superliner derived bi-level intercity railcars.
