= Cowl unit =

Locomotive body style

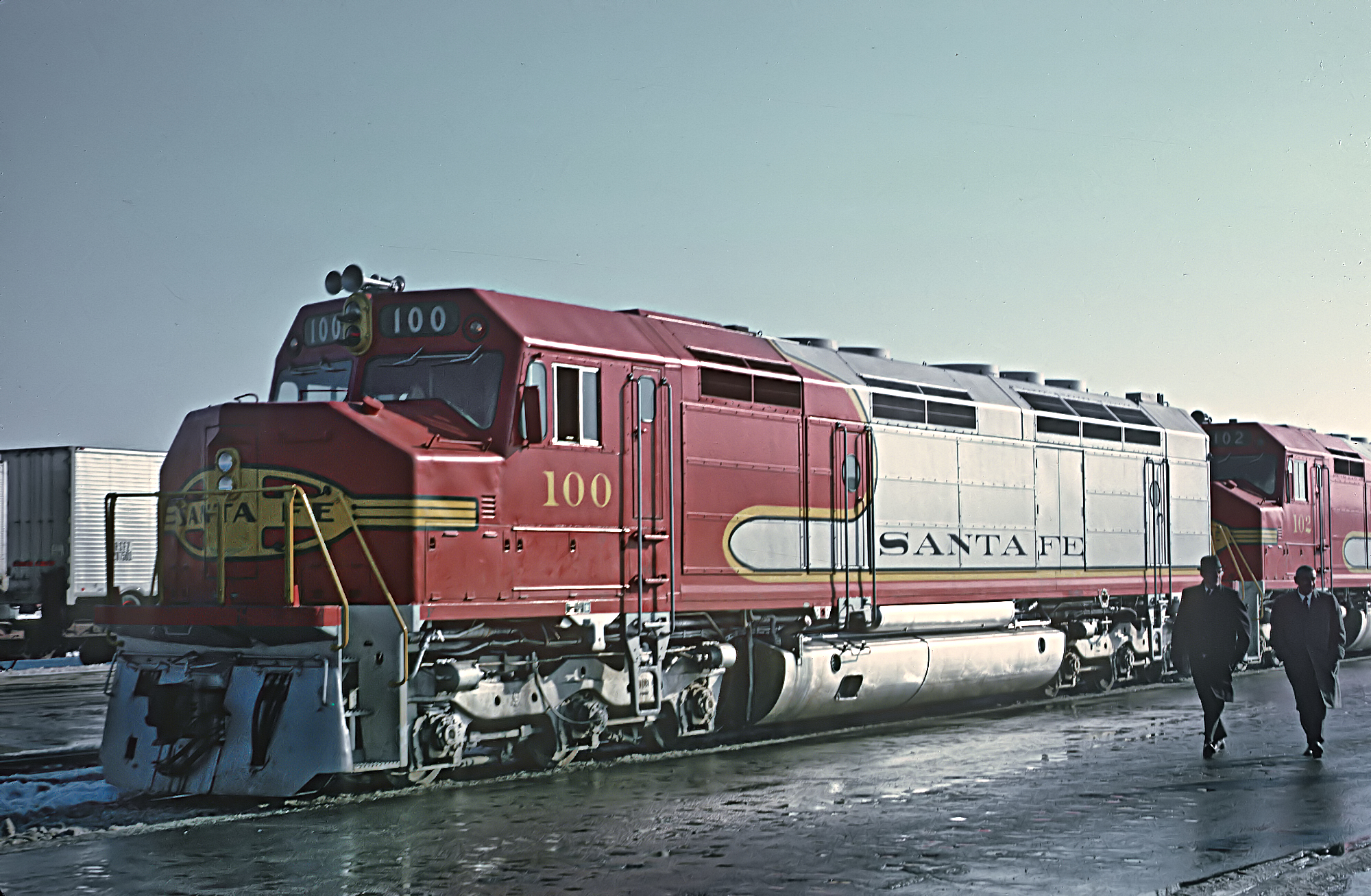
Santa Fe EMD FP45

A cowl unit is a diesel locomotive with full-width, enclosing bodywork, similar in appearance to the cab unit-style of earlier locomotives, such as the EMD F-units of the 1940s and 1950s. The term cowl unit is of North American origin, although similarly-styled locomotives exist elsewhere.

Unlike a cab unit, whose body is both an enclosure and the main structural member of the locomotive, a cowl unit’s bodywork acts only as a enclosure—the body plays no structural role. Structural support for the locomotive’s machinery, as well resistance to buff and draft loads, is embodied in the locomotive's below-deck frame. As the body itself is not structural, it can be removed from the chassis, a feature that facilitates heavy maintenance and repair.

Cowl units were originally produced at the request of the Santa Fe railway, their EMD FP45 units having a full-width “cowl” body built on a EMD SDP45 hood unit's chassis—the SDP45, in turn, was a stretched version of the EMD SD45 freight unit. Amtrak’s SDP40F units were also cowl units, and were built up on the EMD SD40-2 freight locomotive chassis.

Most cowl units have been passenger-hauling locomotives. In this service, the cowl unit's full-width bodywork and smooth sides match the rest of the train's general appearance, as well as facilitate decoration of the locomotive with the livery desired by passenger operators, e.g., Santa Fe’s distinctive “warbonnet” livery. With no decking outside of the carbody, such as found on hood-style freight units, a cowl unit’s design tends to discourage unwanted riders. Furthermore, the smooth outline of the locomotive allows it to be run through the same wash racks used to clean passenger cars.

The main disadvantage of the cowl unit is low rear visibility from the cab. The EMD SD50F and SD60F, GE C40-8M and BBD HR-616 were given a Draper Taper (named after its creator, William L. Draper, a former Canadian National assistant chief of motive power), in which the body is narrower immediately behind the cab, and gradually widens further aft, although the roof remains full-width the length of the locomotive. This arrangement improves rearward visibility to some extent, but such locomotives cannot run in reverse as the lead unit because they do not have ditch lights at both ends.

== Passenger-oriented cowl units ==
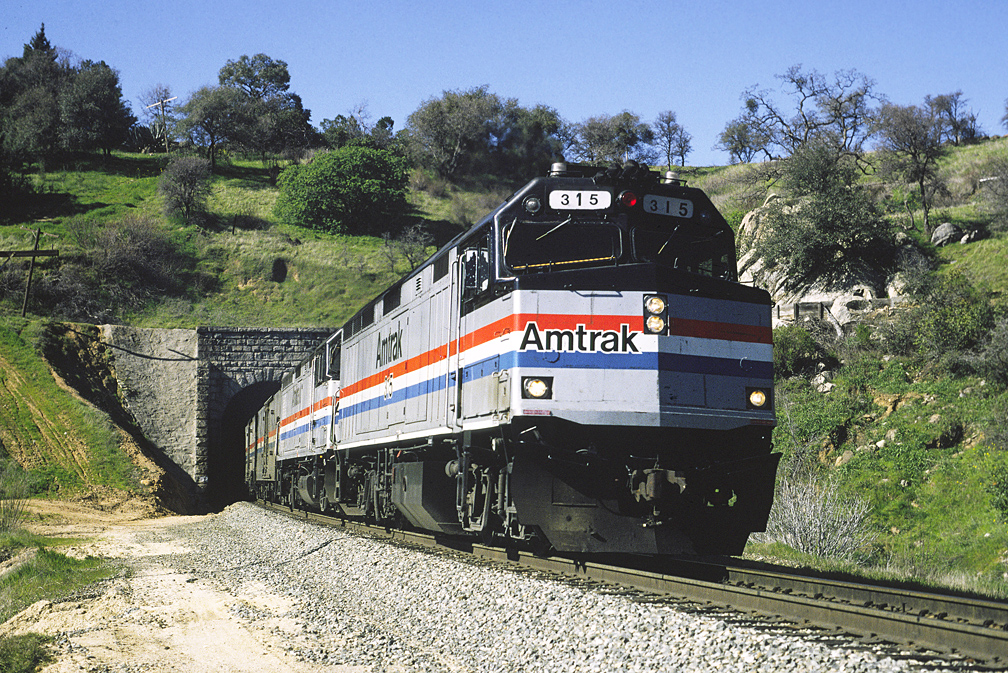
Amtrak EMD F40PH

- EMD FP45
- EMD SDP40F
- EMD F40C
- EMD F40PH
- EMD F40PHR
- EMD F40PH-2
- EMD F40PH-2CAT (rebuild)
- EMD F40PH-2M
- EMD F40PH-4C (rebuild)
- EMD GP40FH-2M (MK/MPI rebuild)
- EMD F59PH
- EMD F59PHI
- EMD F69PHAC
- EMD DE30AC
- EMD DM30AC
- EMD F125
- GE U30CG
- GE P30CH
- GE P40DC
- GE P32AC-DM
- GE P42DC
- MPI F40PHL-2
- MPI F40PH-2C
- MPI F40PH-3C
- MPI MP36PH-3C
- MPI MP36PH-3S
- MPI MP40PH-3C
- MPI MP54AC
- Siemens Charger
- Bombardier ALP-45DP
- EMD/Alstom PL42AC

== Freight-oriented cowl units ==
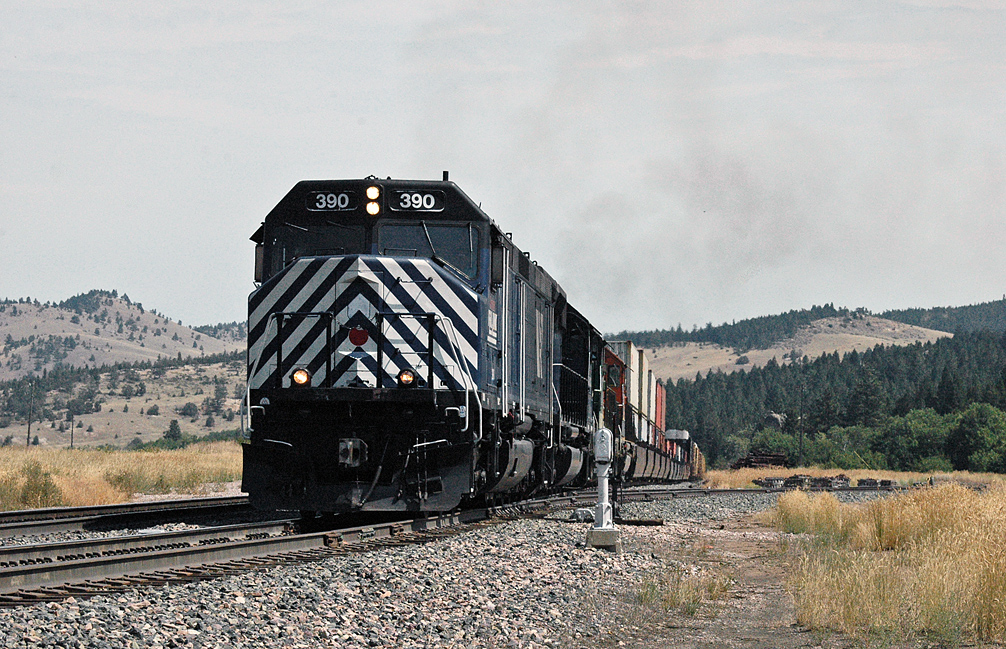
EMD F45

- EMD F45
- EMD FP45 (SDFP45)
- EMD GP40FH-2
- EMD SDP40F (SDF40-2)
- GMD SD40-2F
- GMD SD50F
- GMD SD60F
- GE U30CG
- GE C40-8M
- BBD HR-616
- The ACE 3000 was a proposed modern steam locomotive that would have used this design to make it look more similar to a diesel locomotive.

== Export/license-built cowl units ==
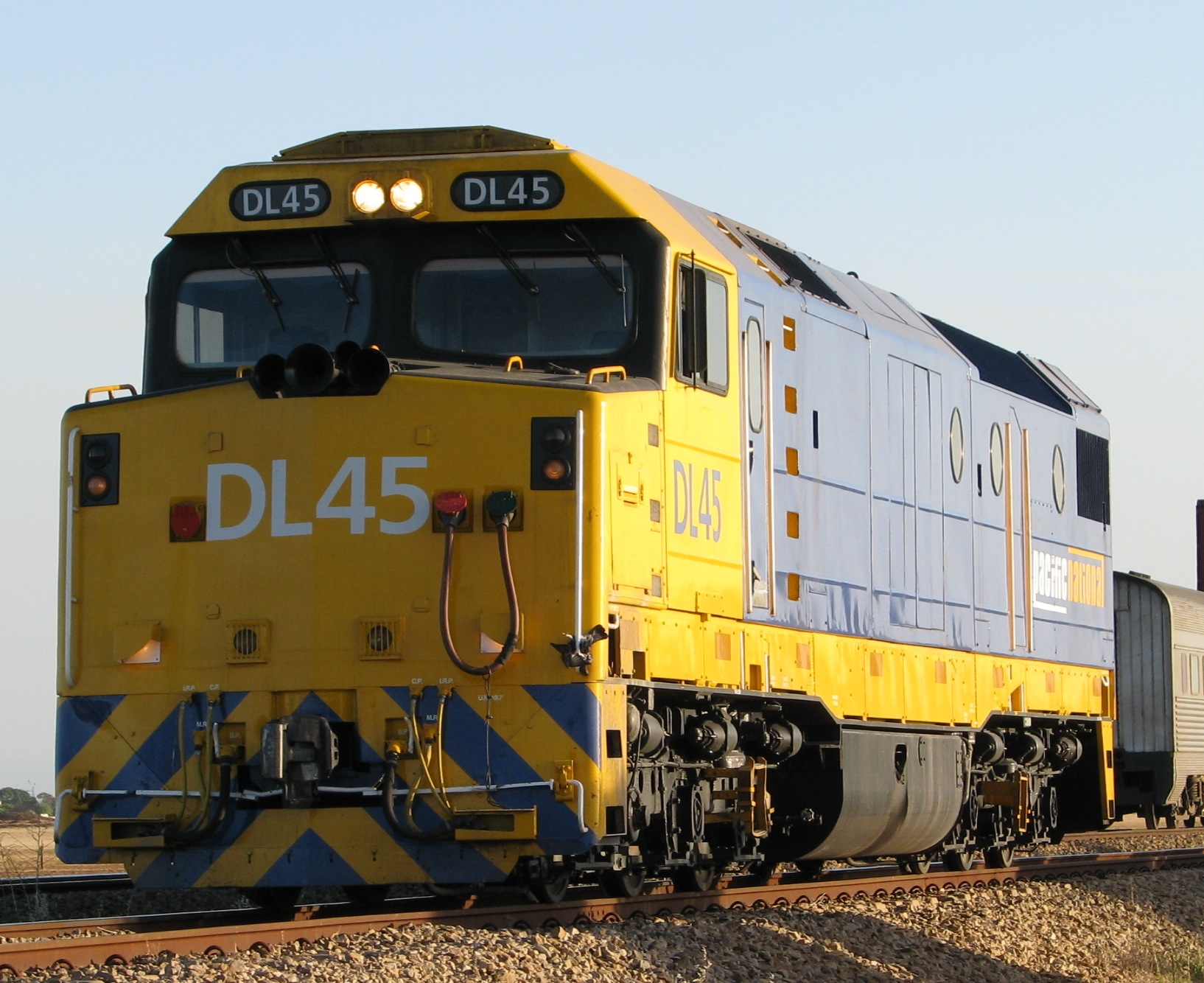
Pacific National EMD AT42C in Australia

- EMD AT42C
- EMD FT36HCW-2

== LMS 10000 & 10001 ==
The LMS Diesels 10000 & 10001, later classified as British Rail Class D16/1, were introduced in 1947. These were Great Britain's first mainline diesel locomotives, coming about a decade after America's first cab units. Despite their streamlined exterior, the LMS units are actually cowl units. It is easy to misinterpret this, because as in North America, cowl designs tend to be more angular in appearance, while cab designs have a similar curved streamlining.
