= GE U30CG =

US passenger diesel locomotive

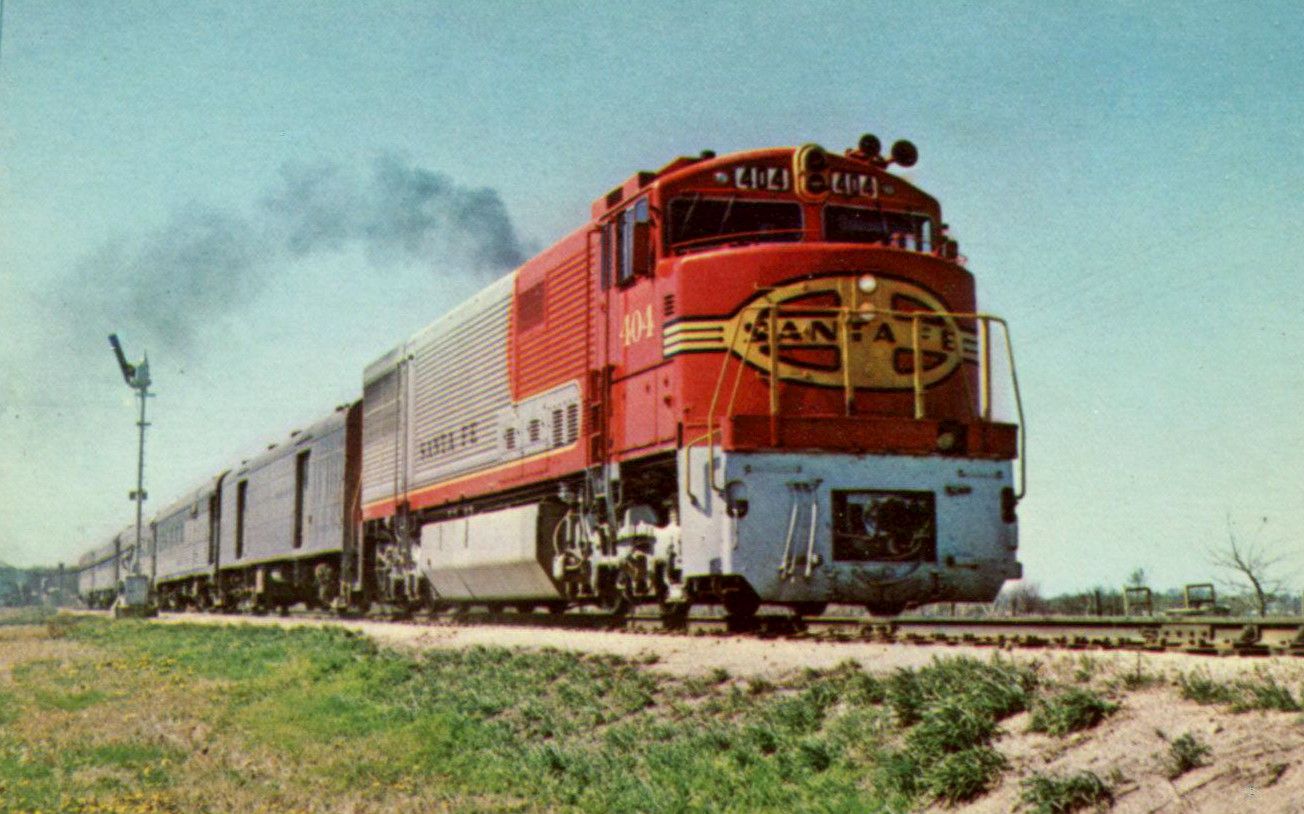
- U30CG 404 pulling the Tulsan in 1969.
Type and origin
- Power type: Diesel-electric
- Builder: GE Transportation Systems
- Build date: 1967
- Total produced: 6
Specifications
- Configuration
  - AAR: C-C
  - UIC: Co'Co'
  - Commonwealth: Co-Co
- Gauge: 4 ft 8 1/2 in (1,435 mm)
Career
- Operators: Atchison, Topeka and Santa Fe Railway
- Numbers: 400–405, later 8000–8005
- Retired: 1980
- Disposition: All scrapped by 1980-1981

The GE U30CG was a passenger-hauling diesel-electric locomotive built by GE Transportation Systems. It was a passenger variant of GE's U30C design purchased by the Atchison, Topeka and Santa Fe Railway. ATSF had purchased ten U28CG locomotives in 1966, and while these locomotives were satisfactory operationally, the railroad felt that their utilitarian appearance was unsuitable for its passenger trains. Desiring smooth-sided passenger power, the railroad ordered the first cowl units from both GE and GM-EMD. GE produced the U30CG to meet this requirement. It was mechanically identical to a U30C except that the bodywork was replaced with a full-width long hood with fluted stainless-steel panels, and a full-width rounded nose and slanted cab front were fitted.

GE's original design had the rounded nose flush with the pilot front, but the Santa Fe rejected this, and the locomotives were fitted with a front walkway. The locomotives were painted in the Santa Fe's famous Warbonnet colors, in exactly the same style as the railroad's F units — unlike the modified scheme used on the U28CGs. The six production locomotives were delivered to the ATSF (road numbers 400-405) in November 1967, a month before EMD's competing FP45s.

The locomotives' initial primary assignment was to the Grand Canyon Limited between Chicago and Los Angeles, but they were also seen on the Super Chief as well as secondary trains such as the Texas Chief and the San Diegan. All this came to an end on February 9, 1969 when a U30CG derailed hauling the Grand Canyon Limited on Edelstein Hill near Chillicothe, Illinois. The U30CG design was suspected, and both classes of GE passenger locomotives were placed on freight assignments, and never were reinstated to passenger service.

Shortly, the U30CGs were renumbered to #8000–8005 and over time were repainted into blue and yellow (either the old freight scheme or Warbonnet), had their steam generators removed, the openings covered, and the shared fuel/water underbody tanks converted to fuel only for greater range. They were used mainly in Colorado freight service and other secondary assignments until September 22, 1980, when they were traded in to GE for new GE B36-7 locomotives. None were preserved, with all six units scrapped by 1981.

== See also ==
- GE P30CH - Another passenger variant of the U30C.
- EMD FP45 - A passenger variant of the EMD SDP45, also ordered by the ATSF
