= EMD FP45 =

US Diesel-electric locomotive

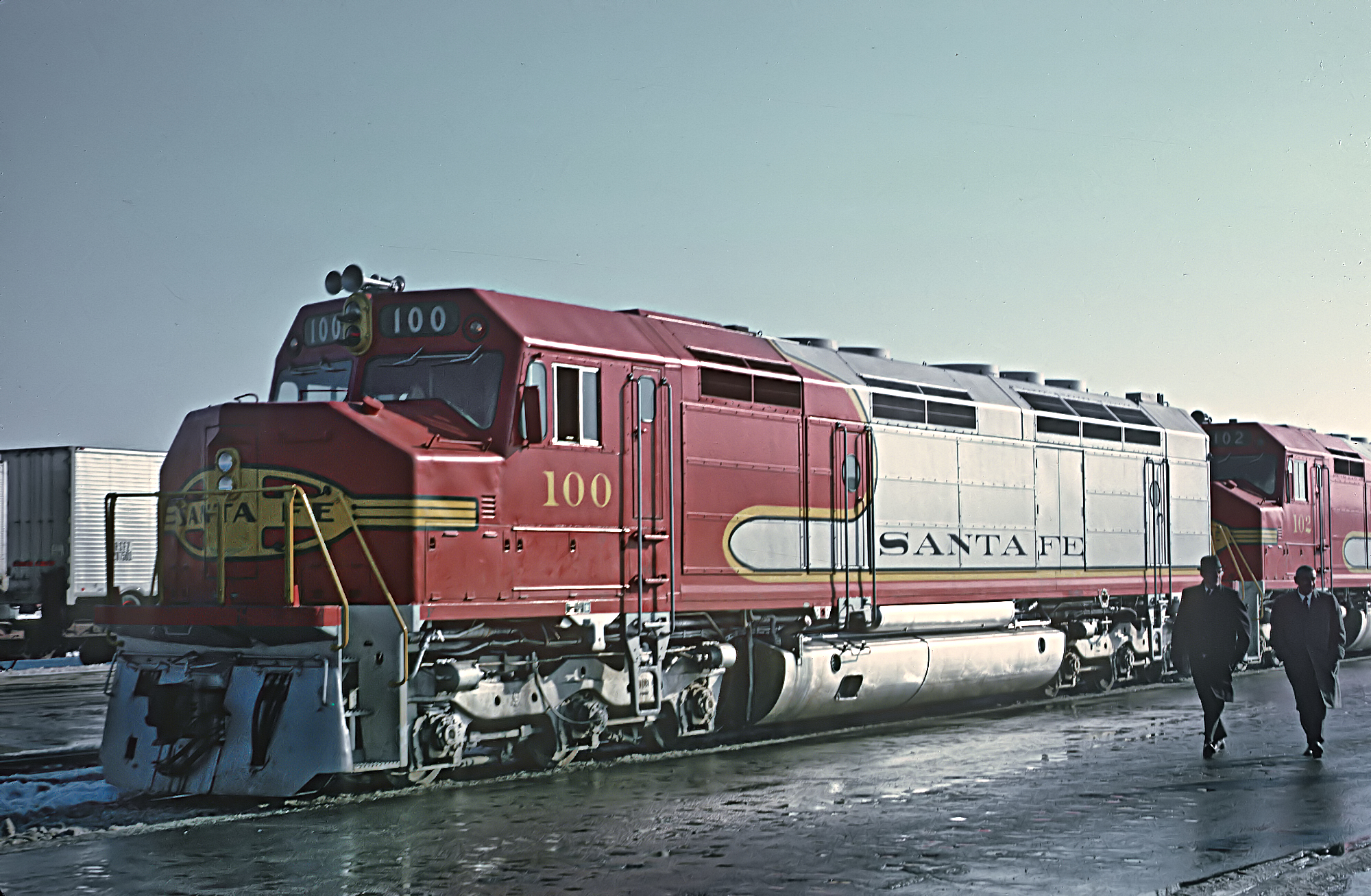
- ATSF 100 and 102 with the Super C in January 1968
Type and origin
- Power type: Diesel-electric
- Builder: General Motors Electro-Motive Division (EMD)
- Model: FP45
- Build date: 1967-1970
- Total produced: 14
Specifications
- Configuration
  - AAR: C-C
- Gauge: 4 ft 8 1/2 in (1,435 mm) standard gauge
- Wheelbase: 45 ft 0 in (13.72 m)
- Length: 72 ft 4 in (22.05 m)
- Prime mover: EMD 20-645E3
- Engine type: Diesel
- Cylinders: 20
Performance figures
- Power output: 3,600 hp (2,680 kW)
Career
- Operators: Santa Fe, Milwaukee Road, and BNSF
- Locale: Western United States
- Disposition: Six preserved in museums, two wrecked, one sold to Wisconsin Central, remainder presumed scrapped

The EMD FP45 is a cowl unit type of C-C diesel locomotive produced in the United States by General Motors Electro-Motive Division (EMD). It was produced beginning in 1967 at the request of the Atchison, Topeka and Santa Fe Railway, which did not want its prestigious Super Chief/El Capitan and other passenger trains pulled by freight style hood unit locomotives, which have external walkways.

== History and development ==
The EMD SDP45 performed well in passenger service, but the Santa Fe Railway felt its utilitarian appearance was unsuitable for its passenger trains. EMD therefore designed a lightweight "cowl" body to cover the locomotive, though it did not, as in earlier cab units, provide any structural strength, which remained in the frame. The cowl provided sleeker looks, better aerodynamics at speed, and allowed the crew to enter the engine compartment en route for diagnostics and maintenance. Final drive gear ratio for passenger service was 57:20.

== Original Owners ==
The Atchison, Topeka, & Santa Fe Railway ordered 9 FP45 locomotives in late 1967. These were numbered 100-108 and painted in the red and yellow warbonnet paint scheme.

About a year later, the Milwaukee Road ordered 4 FP45 locomotives.

== Preservation ==
- Santa Fe 5990 (ex Santa Fe 100): preserved at the Oklahoma Railway Museum in Oklahoma City.
- Santa Fe 92 (ex Santa Fe 102): preserved at the Illinois Railway Museum in Union, Illinois.
- Santa Fe 93 (ex Santa Fe 103): preserved at the Great Plains Transportation Museum in Wichita, Kansas. It was delivered in June 1999 and has undergone cosmetic restoration. Another cosmetic restoration is underway by Mid-America Car, Inc. in Kansas City and is expected to be completed in 4th quarter of 2026.
- Santa Fe 95 (ex Santa Fe 105): Preserved at the Western America Railroad Museum in Barstow, California.
- Santa Fe 107: Preserved The Museum of the American Railroad in Frisco, Texas. It is currently undergoing a cosmetic restoration to its, as delivered, appearance.
- Santa Fe 108: was donated in operating condition minus the cab's air conditioner to the Southern California Railway Museum at Perris, California. This locomotive has the distinction of being the last passenger locomotive ever purchased by Santa Fe. Its restoration was completed in October 2018 and it is now in operating condition for the first time since 2012.

== See also ==
- EMD F45 - A freight-only derivative of the FP45 produced for the ATSF, Great Northern, and Burlington Northern Railroads
- EMD SDP40F - A derivative of the FP45 produced for Amtrak
- GE U30CG - A cowl-bodied passenger variant of the GE U30C, also ordered by the ATSF
