= EMD SDP40F =

Class of diesel passenger locomotives

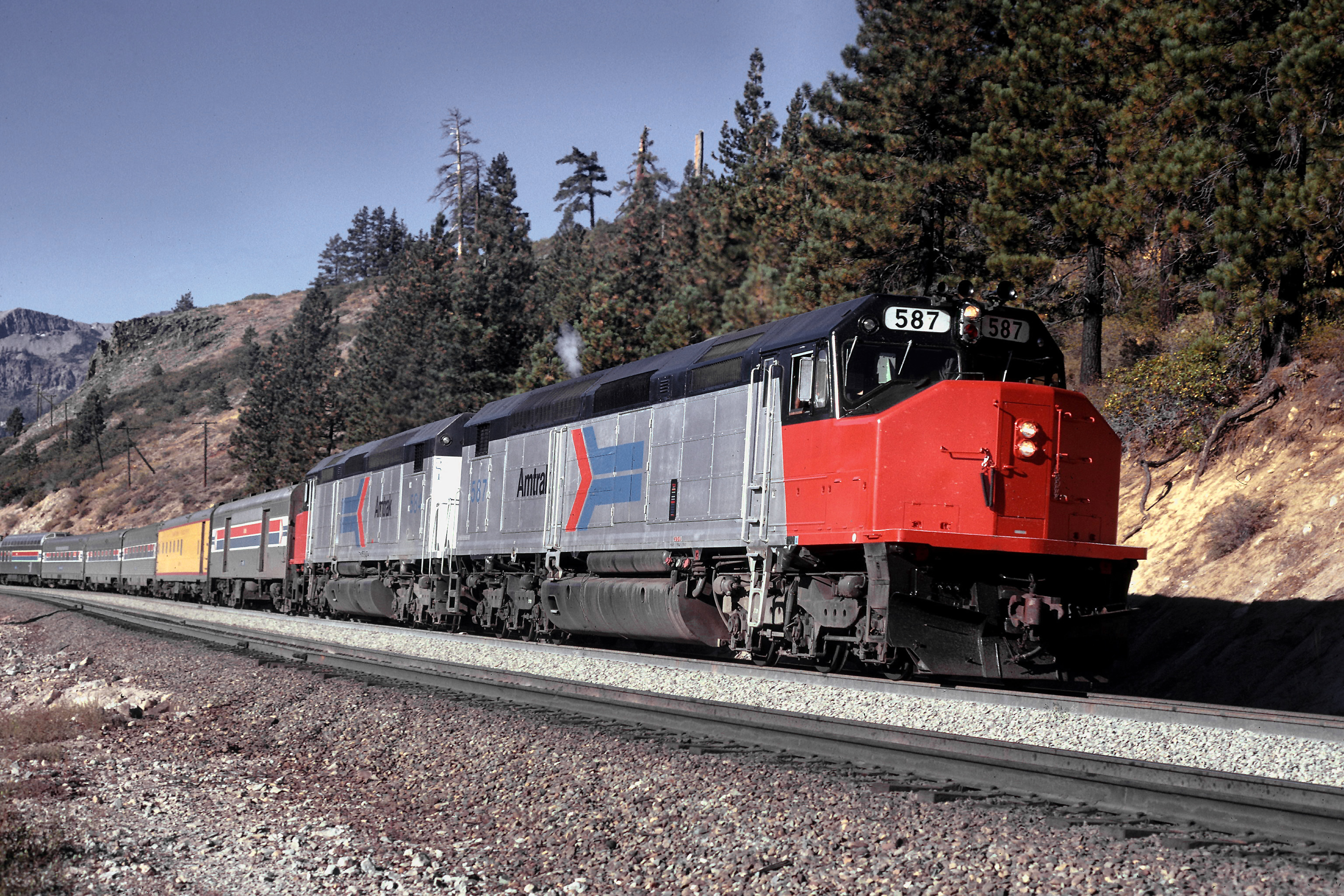
- A duo of EMD SDP40F locomotives with No. 587 leading the San Francisco Zephyr in 1978.
Type and origin
- Power type: Diesel–electric
- Builder: GM Electro-Motive Division (EMD)
- Model: SDP40F
- Build date: June 1973 – August 1974
- Total produced: 150
Specifications
- Configuration
  - AAR: C-C
  - UIC: Co' Co'
  - Commonwealth: Co-Co
- Gauge: 4 ft 8 1/2 in (1,435 mm) standard gauge
- Trucks: HT-C
- Length: 72 ft 4 in (22.0 m)
- Width: 10 ft 4 in (3.1 m)
- Fuel capacity: 2,500 US gal (9,500 L; 2,100 imp gal)
- Water cap.: 3,500 US gal (13,000 L; 2,900 imp gal)
- Prime mover: EMD 16-645E3
- RPM
  - RPM idle: 315
  - Maximum RPM: 900
- Engine type: V16 diesel
- Aspiration: Turbocharged
- Cylinders: 16
- Loco brake: straight air, dynamic brakes
- Train brakes: air
Performance figures
- Maximum speed: 94–100 mph (151–161 km/h)
- Power output: 3,000 hp (2.2 MW)
Career
- Operators: Amtrak; Atchison, Topeka & Santa Fe; BNSF
- Number in class: 150
- Numbers: 500–649
- Locale: United States
- Withdrawn: Between 1977 and 1987
- Preserved: One (BNSF No. 6976 - ex-Amtrak No. 644) preserved, two in service (EMDX No. 169 and 218 - ex-Amtrak No. 609 and 509, heavily modified)
- Disposition: Amtrak No. 644 currently operational at the Illinois Railway Museum in Union, Illinois, EMD No. 169 and 218 in use as a test locomotive at the TTC, remainder scrapped

The EMD SDP40F is a cowl unit, six-axle, 3,000 hp (2.2 MW) C-C diesel–electric locomotive built by General Motors Electro-Motive Division (EMD) from 1973 to 1974. Based on Santa Fe's EMD FP45, EMD built 150 for Amtrak, the operator of most intercity passenger trains in the United States. Amtrak, a private company but funded by the United States government, had begun operation in 1971 with a fleet of aging diesel locomotives inherited from various private railroads. The SDP40F was the first diesel locomotive built new for Amtrak and for a brief time they formed the backbone of the company's long-distance fleet.

A series of derailments in the mid-1970s shattered Amtrak's confidence in the locomotive, and many railroads banned it from their tracks. Multiple investigations pointed to issues with the locomotive's trucks, the weight of the water and steam generators used for train heating, the rough and poorly maintained tracks, or the harmonic vibration of baggage cars behind the locomotive. In 1977, Amtrak decided to retire the SDP40F in favor of the EMD F40PH, which was already in use on short-distance routes. Amtrak traded most of its fleet into EMD; the components were incorporated into new F40PHs. The remainder were traded to the Atchison, Topeka and Santa Fe Railway (ATSF) for use in freight service. The Santa Fe rebuilt the locomotives and designated them SDF40-2. The Burlington Northern Santa Fe Railway (BNSF), successor to the Santa Fe, retired them in 2002. One of them is preserved, that one being ex-Amtrak No. 644.

== Background ==
Amtrak assumed operation of most intercity rail passenger service in the United States on May 1, 1971. Until then, such services were operated by various private railroads. The private railroads chose to retain their second generation passenger locomotives for freight service, or to operate the various commuter services which, by law, did not pass to Amtrak. To operate these intercity services the Amtrak had to buy or lease from the private railroads whatever locomotives remained. This left Amtrak with an aging and mechanically incompatible fleet of diesel locomotives. The mainstays of Amtrak's road diesel fleet were veteran E8s, E9s, F3Bs, F7s, and FP7s. These ranged from 7 to 24 years old and were due for replacement.

== Design ==
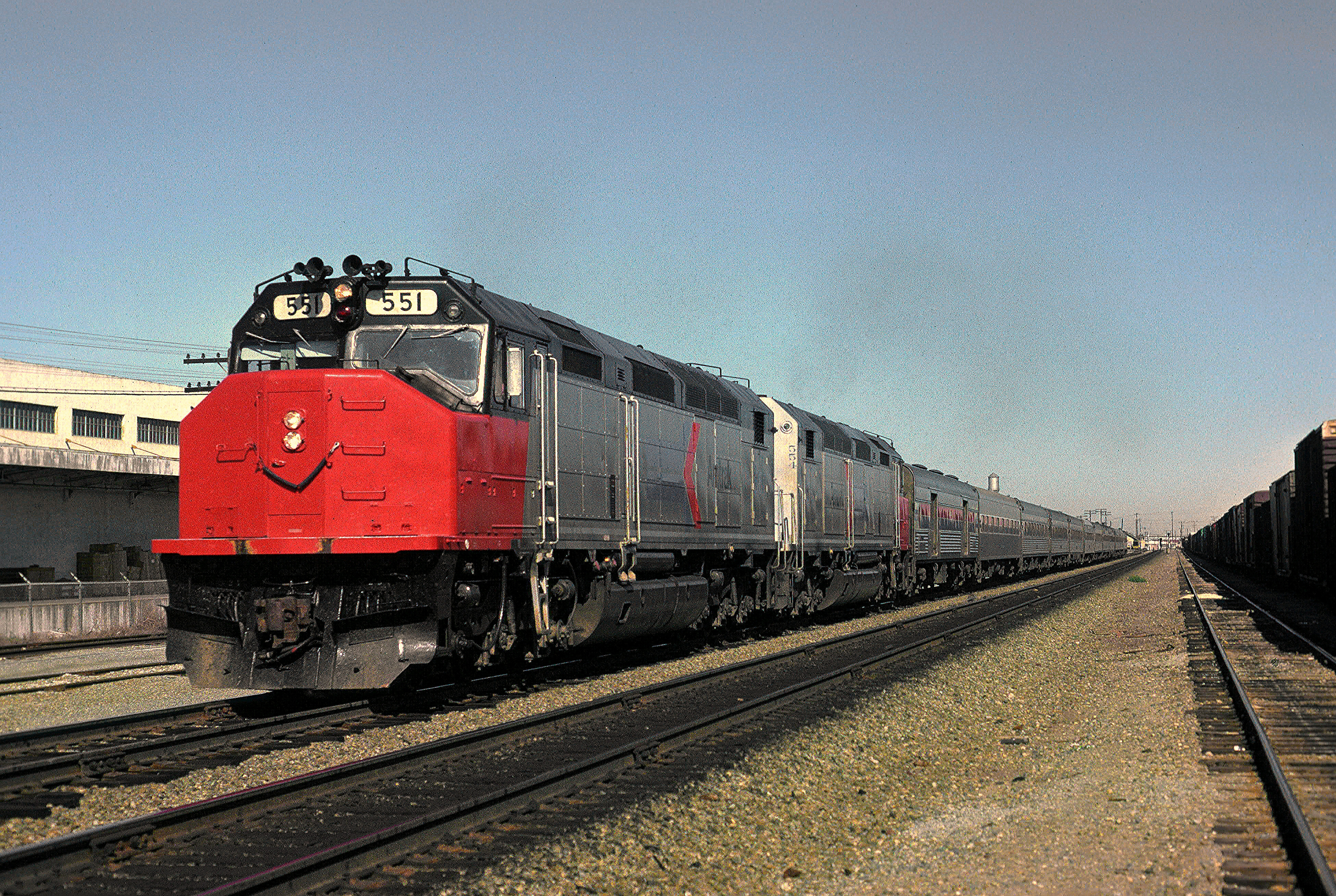
No. 551 at Newhall Yard in San Jose, California, with the Coast Starlight in 1975. The later SDP40Fs were distinguished from the first 40 by lower-profile cooling fans.

The SDP40F was a full-width cowl unit. It was based on the EMD FP45 passenger locomotive and EMD SD40-2 freight locomotive. All three shared the EMD 645E3 diesel prime mover, which developed 3,000 hp (2.2 MW). The locomotive had a gear ratio of 57:20. Maximum speed at full horsepower was 94 mph (151 km/h); the locomotive exceeded 100 miles per hour (160 km/h) in tests. The SDP40F was fitted with a Leslie Controls SL4T (S4T) air horn. There were doubts at the time about Amtrak's long-term viability, so the locomotives were designed for easy conversion to freight locomotives; should Amtrak cease operation.

In the early 1970s, Amtrak's passenger car fleet was steam-heated; Amtrak's requirement called for two steam generators. These were located at the rear of the locomotive. Forward of the generators was a 1,350-US-gallon (5,100 L; 1,120 imp gal) water tank. This tank rested above the floor line. The lateral motion of the water within was later implicated in several derailments. The primary underbody tank was split between water and diesel fuel, carrying 2,150 US gallons (8,100 L; 1,790 imp gal) of water and 2,500 US gallons (9,500 L; 2,100 imp gal) of diesel. (Note: Sources agree on a 6,000-US-gallon (23,000 L; 5,000 imp gal) total tank capacity and 3,500-US-gallon (13,000 L; 2,900 imp gal) water capacity, but some say the carbody tank was 1,500 US gallons (5,700 L; 1,200 imp gal). EMD's specifications manual says 1350 gallons.) Provision was made for eventual conversion to head-end power (HEP), but it was never carried out.

EMD based the SDP40F name on the existing SDP40. Several years earlier, EMD had made similar versions of the SDP45 and SD45 in a full-width cowl unit, which it named FP45 and F45. Although the SDP40F was externally nearly identical to the FP45, EMD chose not to give the new locomotive a similar name such as FP40. EMD wanted to avoid adding a new locomotive type to their catalog due to price controls in effect in the early 1970s. The following year, the F40C name was used for a similar locomotive ordered by the Chicago, Milwaukee, St. Paul and Pacific Railroad (the "Milwaukee Road"), equipped with HEP instead of steam generators.

There were several minor differences between the first 40 locomotives built and later examples. The most important was the installation of lower-profile cooling fans and air horns to avoid clearance problems in the Eastern US.

== History ==
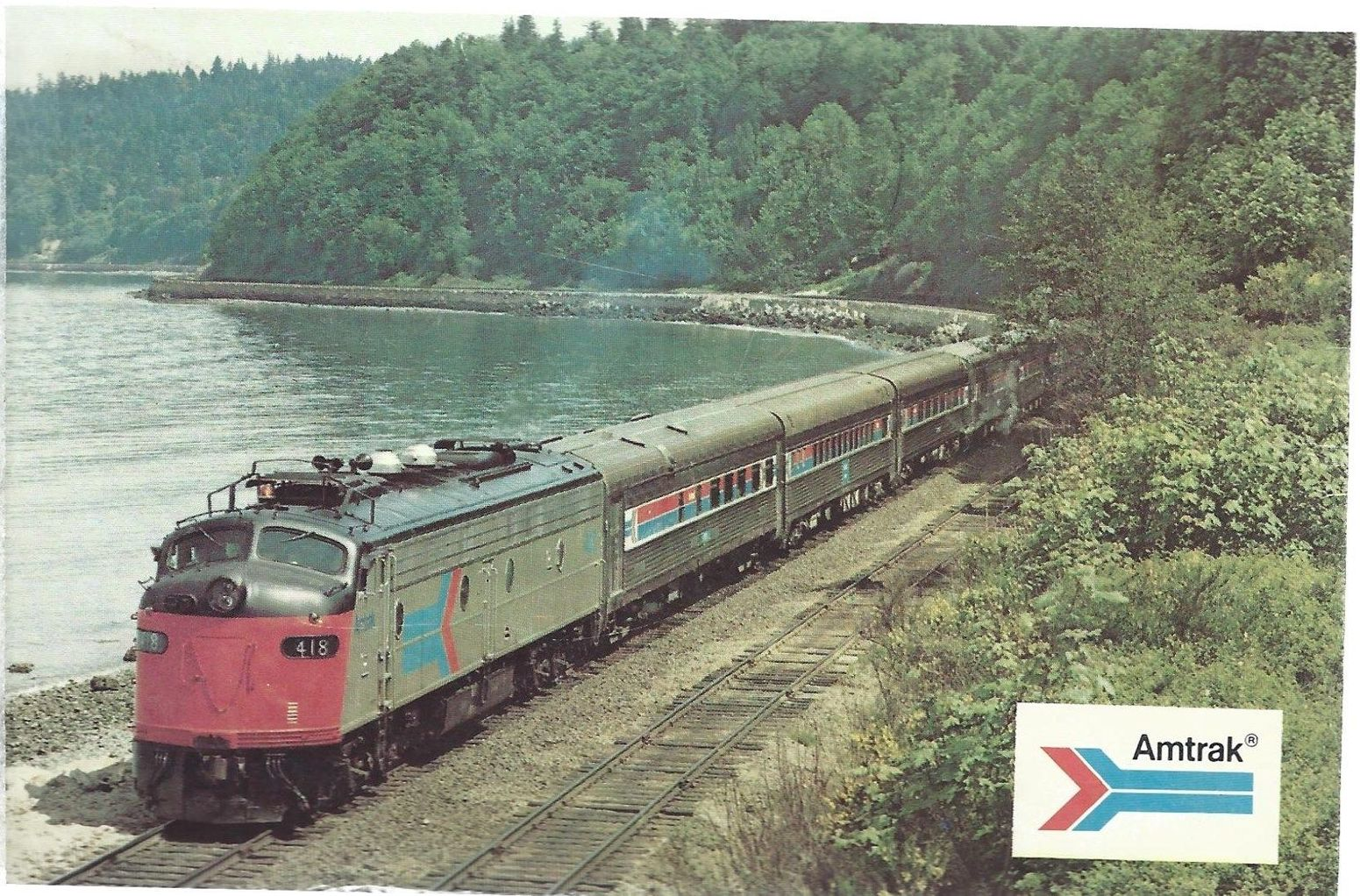
An EMD E8 on the Coast Starlight in 1974. Amtrak planned to replace its E-units with the SDP40F

Amtrak ordered 150 SDP40Fs, in two batches. The first order, placed on November 2, 1972, was for 40 locomotives, at a cost of $18 million. A second order, for 110 locomotives at $50 million, followed on October 12, 1973. These orders were Amtrak's first for new-build locomotives. Amtrak deployed the original 40 locomotives on long-distance trains in the Western United States. The locomotives entered revenue service on June 22, 1973, hauling the Super Chief from Chicago to Los Angeles over the Atchison, Topeka and Santa Fe Railway. SDP40Fs were also used on the Burlington Northern Railroad. The arrival of the second order enabled Amtrak to deploy the SDP40Fs throughout the country, displacing the inherited E-units.

=== Derailments ===
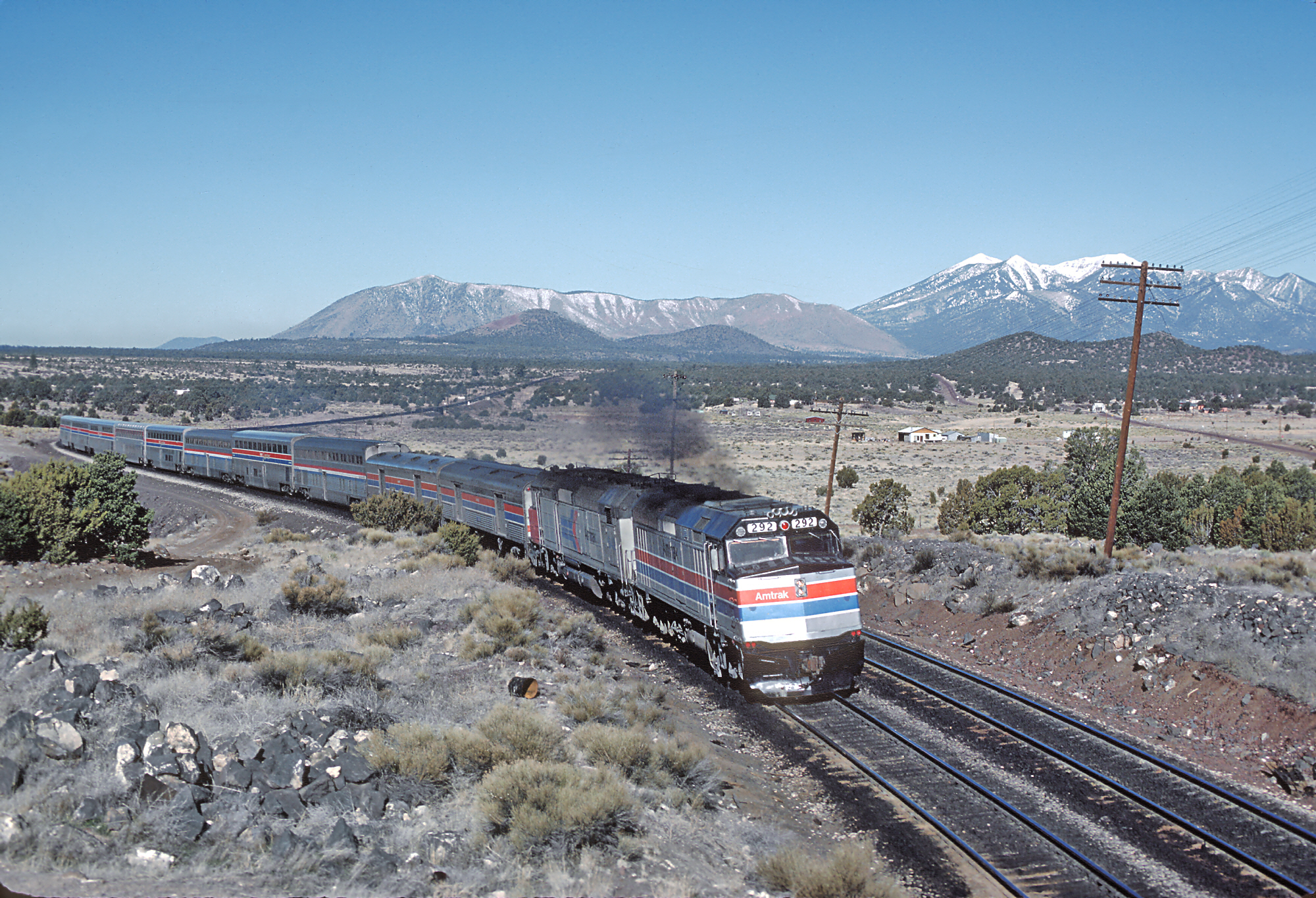
EMD F40PHR with an SDP40F on the head of the Southwest Limited 1981. The SDP40Fs time with Amtrak was drawing to a close

In late 1975, J. David Ingles called the SDP40Fs the "stars of Amtrak's long-distance trains," but engine crews reported that the locomotives rode poorly compared to the E-units they had replaced. Even as Amtrak and EMD investigated the ride quality, the SDP40F was involved in a series of derailments that led to the end of its career as a passenger locomotive. Between 1974 and 1976, the Federal Railroad Administration (FRA) identified thirteen incidents for which the locomotive was responsible. None of the incidents were serious, but their frequency was a concern. Most of the derailments occurred on trains with two SDP40Fs on the front and at least one trailing baggage car. While the rear truck of the second locomotive and the front truck of the baggage car were pinpointed as the source of the derailment, the actual cause of the derailments was unclear.

EMD, Amtrak, the Association of American Railroads (AAR), and the FRA tested the locomotive thoroughly, with suspicion falling on the "hollow bolster" truck design. In the end, the investigators theorized that the steam generators and water tank may have made the rear of the engine too heavy and created too much lateral motion. Later FRA investigations concluded that the actual culprit was the light weight of the baggage cars, which caused harmonic vibrations when placed directly behind the much heavier SDP40F. A contributing factor was the sometimes poor quality of track the locomotive operated over.

Amtrak took several corrective measures, including operating with a reduced speed on curves, emptying the smaller of the two water tanks to reduce lateral motion, and making various alterations to the trucks. The measures helped, but the trouble continued. Several railroads, including the Burlington and the Chesapeake and Ohio Railway (C&O), banned the "rail breakers" from their tracks, since they were suspected to be causing the spreading of rails because of their lateral swaying, which may have contributed to the derailments. For the Chicago–Seattle Empire Builder, the speed restrictions added 6 hours to what had been a 46-hour schedule. Another important development was the unusually harsh winter of 1976–1977, which sidelined many of Amtrak's aging steam-heated coaches. Amtrak suspended numerous routes and pressed the new HEP-equipped Amfleet I coaches, designed for short runs, into service. The new EMD F40PH, intended for short-distance service and equipped with HEP, handled these trains.

In the spring of 1977, Amtrak faced a power crisis. In addition to the SDP40Fs derailing, Amtrak was having trouble with two other six-axle designs. The GE E60CP and E60CH electric locomotives were having derailment problems. The GE P30CH had the same truck design as E60s and rode poorly, although it did not exhibit the same tendency to derail. Amtrak decided to abandon the SDP40F in favor of the F40PH, a four-axle design with none of the riding problems of the six-axle locomotives. Amtrak traded 40 SDP40Fs back to EMD. Components including the prime mover were installed into an F40PH's frame. Between 1977 and 1987, Amtrak traded 132 of the SDP40Fs back to EMD for F40PHRs. The SDP40F remained in service on the Santa Fe longer than elsewhere, although the arrival of HEP-equipped Superliner cars on the Western routes displaced them from there as well. The last SDP40Fs left the Amtrak roster in 1987. The remaining Amtrak SDP40Fs that weren't sold to the ATSF (seen below) are presumed to have been scrapped.

=== Freight use ===
Santa Fe SDF40-2 No. 5250 in 1986

In 1984, Amtrak, low on light-duty power, traded 18 SDP40Fs to the Santa Fe for 43 switchers: 25 CF7s and 18 SSB1200s. Santa Fe rebuilt the traded locomotives for freight use. Modifications included removing the steam generators and regearing for lower speed. The locomotives were also given front steps and platforms, and notched noses in order to improve boarding access. The rebuilt locomotives were designated SDF40-2. The SDF40-2s continued in service with the BNSF Railway, successor to the Santa Fe, until their retirement in 2002.

== Preservation ==
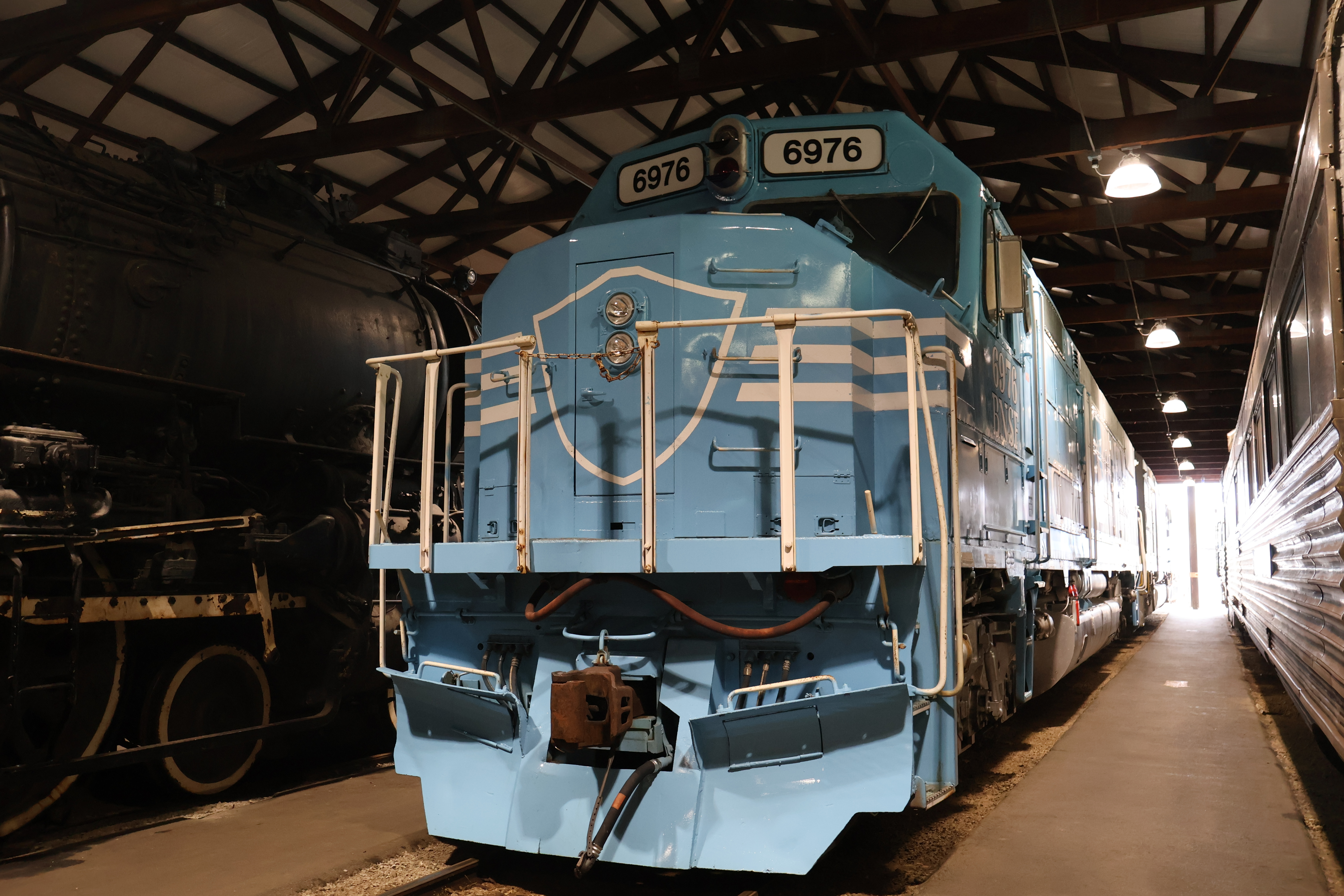
BNSF 6976 (ex-Amtrak 644) on display at the Illinois Railway Museum in May 2026

One SDP40F, ex-Amtrak No. 644 (later ATSF 5266 and then BNSF 6976), was acquired by Dynamic Rail Preservation Inc., who restored the locomotive to its Maersk Sealand livery and returned it to operation in November 2019, operating on the Nevada Southern Railroad. In July 2025, Dynamic Rail donated the engine to the Illinois Railway Museum, where it continues to operate on the museum's excursion runs.

On November 3, 2025, an Instagram post from MxV Rail revealed that two units, EMDX Nos. 169 and 218, remain on property in operating condition. Another post from June 23, 2026 revealed some pictures of EMDX 218. These units were two of several traded back to EMD from Amtrak, and were used as testbeds before being sold to TTCI.
