= EMD F40C =

North American diesel locomotive class

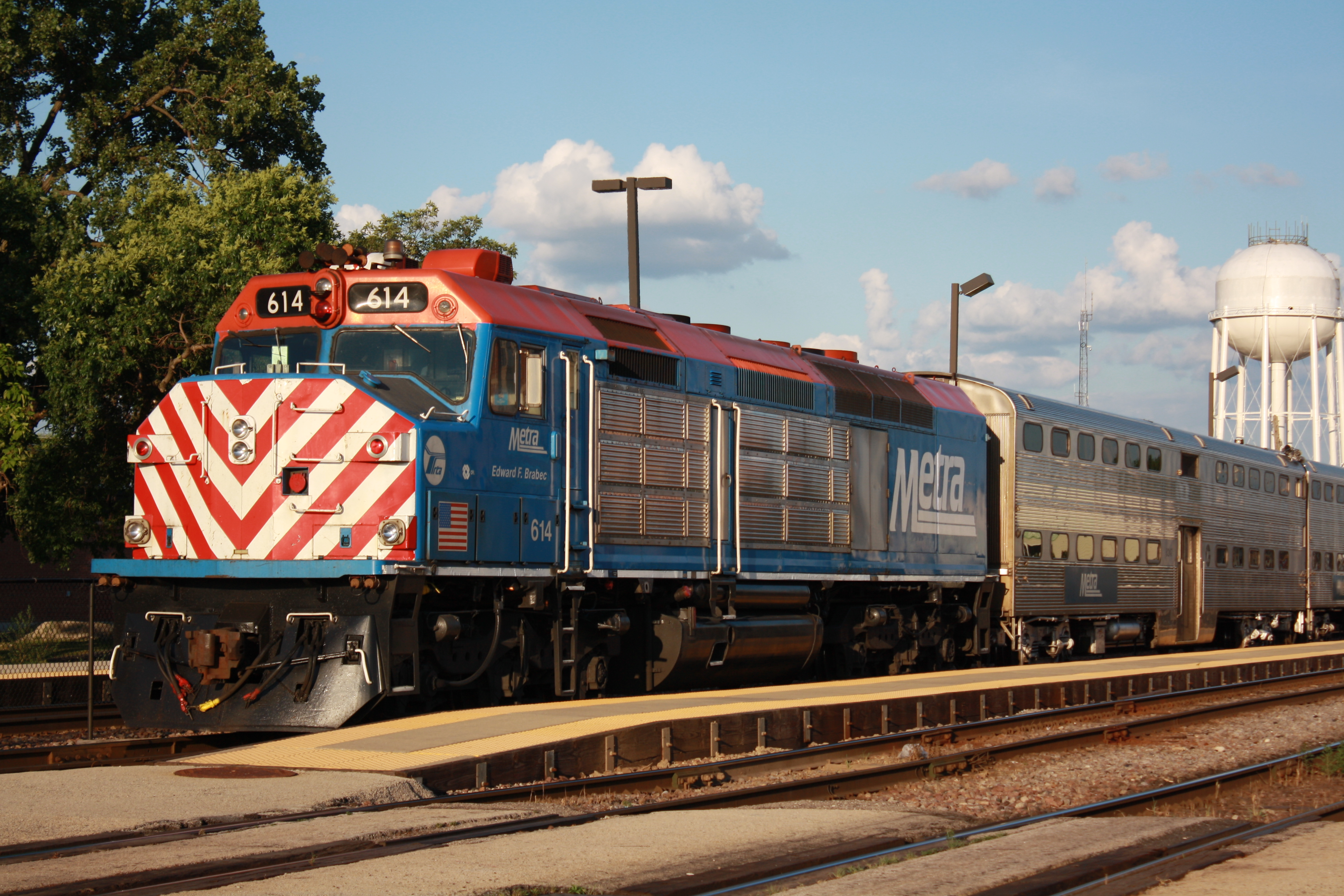
- Metra F40C No. 614
Type and origin
- Power type: Diesel-electric
- Builder: General Motors Electro-Motive Division (EMD)
- Build date: March – May 1974
- Total produced: 15
Specifications
- Configuration
  - AAR: C-C
  - UIC: Co’Co’
- Gauge: 4 ft 8 1/2 in (1,435 mm) standard gauge
- Length: 68 ft 10 in (20.98 m)
- Width: 10 ft 4 in (3.15 m)
- Height: 15 ft 7.5 in (4.763 m)
- Loco weight: 364,000 lb (165,000 kg)
- Prime mover: EMD 16-645E3B
- Engine type: V16 diesel
- Cylinders: 16
Performance figures
- Power output: 3,200 hp (2,390 kW)
Career
- Operators: Milwaukee Road, Metra
- Numbers: 40-54 (Milwaukee Road); 600-614 (Metra)
- Locale: Chicago, Illinois, and its northwest suburbs
- Retired: 2003 - 2004, 2012
- Disposition: Two preserved, remainder scrapped

The EMD F40C is a 6-axle 3,200 horsepower (2.4 MW) diesel-electric locomotive built by General Motors Electro-Motive Division in 1974 for commuter service in Chicago. EMD only built 15 locomotives; the decline of the 6-axle design for passenger service led to the adoption of the 4-axle EMD F40PH as the standard passenger locomotive in the United States. Along with a small fleet of HEP-equipped EMD SD70MAC locomotives operating on the Alaska Railroad, the F40Cs were the last six-axle passenger locomotives in daily service in mainland North America until the delivery of Metra's first SD70MACH in 2022.

By 2012, all of the F40Cs were retired from Metra's roster. They were replaced by the MPI MP36PH-3S in 2003–2004. Locomotives 600-609 and 613 were the first to be retired in 2003 and had their road numbers unregistered with the Federal Railroad Administration. They were all retired before 2007. No. 610 was unregistered in 2004 and was sent to National Railway Equipment in Dixmoor, Illinois. It was scrapped on September 24, 2020. The only F40Cs that remain are Nos. 611 and 614. Both have been preserved, with No. 611 being donated to the Railroading Heritage of Midwest America, and No. 614 being sent to the Illinois Railway Museum.

== Design ==
The F40C is derived from the EMD SDP40F; besides the shorter length, the primary difference between the two is the substitution of a 500-kilowatt (670 hp) HEP generator for the SDP40F's twin steam generators. It is powered by a 16 cylinder EMD 645E3B, producing 3,200 horsepower (2,390 kW). It uses the same frame as the EMD SD40-2, giving it an overall length of 68 feet 10 inches (20.98 m).

== History ==
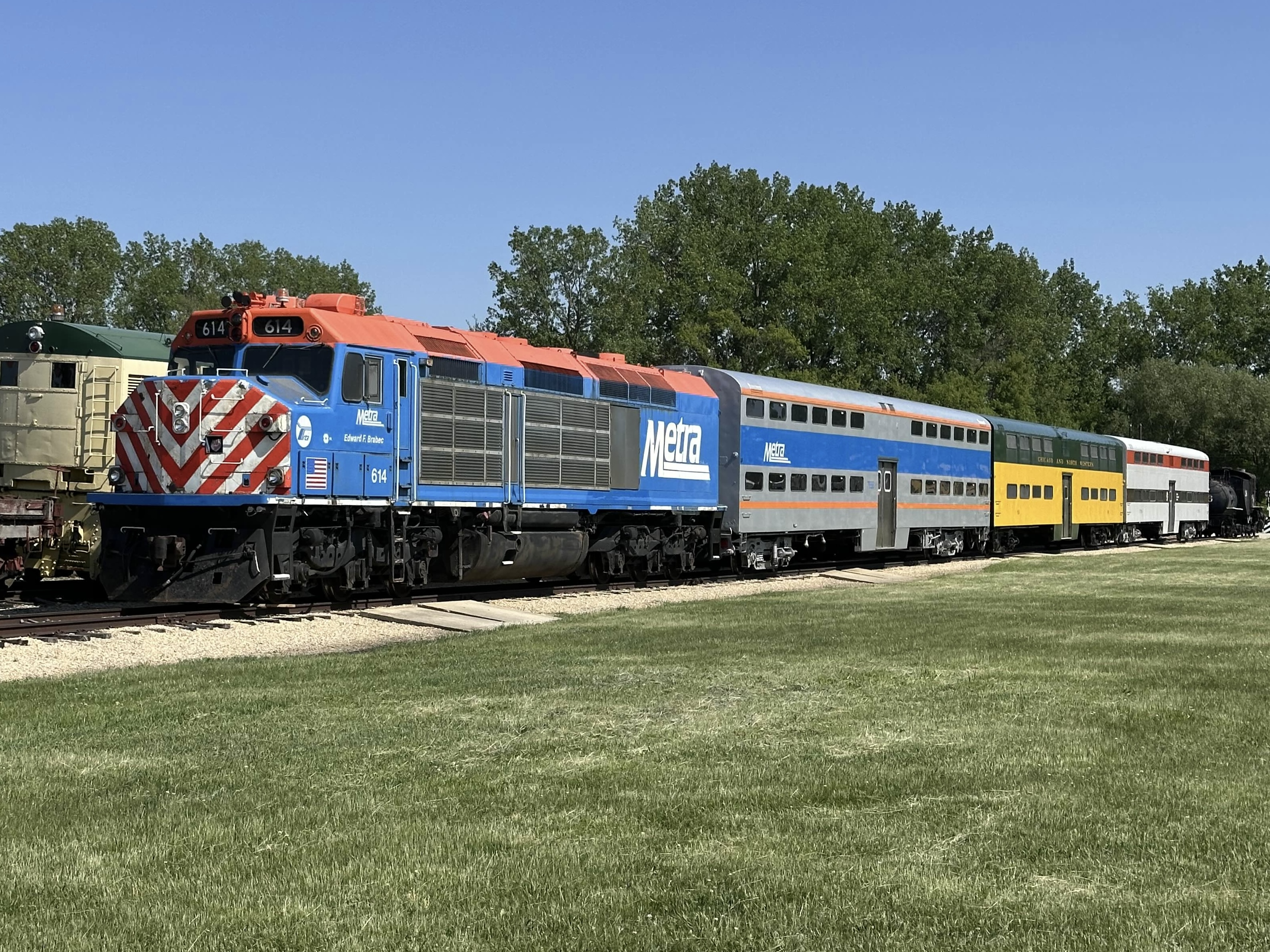
No. 614 on display at the Illinois Railway Museum

In the early 1970s, the Milwaukee Road operated two commuter rail lines in Chicago: the Milwaukee District North Line to Fox Lake via the Canadian Pacific's C&M Subdivision, and the Milwaukee District West Line to Elgin via the CP's Elgin Subdivision. The operation of these lines was subsidized by local transit agencies. In 1974, two local agencies, the North West Suburban Mass Transit District and the North Suburban Mass Transit District funded the acquisition of 15 F40Cs for use on the Milwaukee lines. The locomotives were numbered 40-54, and were passed to Metra on the latter's creation in the 1980s, being renumbered to 600-614, but they continued to operate on the ex-Milwaukee lines.

The F40Cs were withdrawn from regular service with the arrival of new MPI MP36PH-3S locomotives in 2003–2004. Twelve were sold to locomotive leasing corporations Helm Leasing and one to National Railway Equipment. The remaining two, Nos. 611 and 614, were retained and stored at Western Avenue railyard. Both were reactivated in January 2005 after problems with the MPI MP36PH-3Ss. In 2005, Kansas City Southern signed a contract with Helm Leasing to use 12 for nine months.

In the spring of 2008, Nos. 611 and 614 were returned to revenue service on both of Metra's ex-Milwaukee Road commuter lines. This was done while the oldest units in Metra's EMD F40PH fleet were being rebuilt. Towards the end of 2016, with many F40PH-2 and F40PHM-2 locomotives being sent out for rebuild, there was an increased likelihood that 611 and 614 would be put back into service. Despite this, neither had seen regular service since 2012. Metra at one time did have plans to rebuild both remaining F40Cs to test new prime movers and control packages, but due to a lack of bidders, this plan was put on hold indefinitely & ultimately never came to fruition.

== Preservation ==
- In February 2025, No. 614 was donated by Metra to the Illinois Railway Museum in Union, Illinois, who are currently restoring the unit to operating condition.
- A year later, in March 2026, Metra donated No. 611 to the Railroading Heritage of Midwest America in Silvis, Illinois, who plans to restore their unit to operation also.
