= Bombardier HR-616 =

Type and origin
- Power type: Diesel-electric
- Builder: Bombardier
- Order number: 4944
- Serial number: M6118-01 to M6118-20
- Model: HR-616
- Build date: February–August 1982
- Total produced: 20
Specifications
- Configuration
  - AAR: C-C
  - UIC: Co′Co′
- Gauge: 4 ft 8 1/2 in (1,435 mm)
- Wheel diameter: 40 in (1.0 m)
- Minimum curve: 21°
- Wheelbase: Between truck centers: 54 ft 6 in (16.61 m); Truck wheelbase: 11 ft 2 in (3.40 m)
- Length: 69 ft 11 in (21.31 m)
- Width: 10 ft 3 in (3.12 m)
- Height: 15 ft 5 in (4.70 m)
- Loco weight: 390,000 lb (180 t)
- Fuel type: Diesel
- Fuel capacity: 2,000 US gal (7,600 L)
- Lubricant cap.: 330 US gal (1,200 L)
- Coolant cap.: 300 US gal (1,100 L)
- Sandbox cap.: 56 cu ft (1.6 m^{3})
- Prime mover: ALCO 16-251E
- RPM range: 400 - 1100
- Engine type: V16 4-stroke diesel
- Aspiration: Mechanically-assisted turbocharger
- Generator: GE GTA11P
- Cylinders: 16
- Cylinder size: 9 in (23 cm) diameter × 10 1/2 in (27 cm) stroke
- Loco brake: Straight air, Dynamic
- Train brakes: 26-L air
Performance figures
- Maximum speed: 65 mph (105 km/h)
- Power output: 3,000 hp (2.2 MW)
- Tractive effort: Continuous: 74,000 lbf (329 kN)
Career
- Operators: Canadian National Railway
- Class: MF-30c (later MF-32a)
- Numbers: 2100-2119
- Locale: North America
- Disposition: All scrapped.

The Bombardier HR616, also known as the MLW HR616, was a 6 axle, 3,000 horsepower (2.2 MW) freight locomotive manufactured in Montreal, Quebec, Canada. Twenty were built for Canadian National Railway in 1982, numbered 2100–2119, with 2100–2103 being temporarily renumbered as Bombardier 7001–7004, and rated at 3,200 hp (2.4 MW) for demonstration of the new model on Canadian Pacific Railway in 1983. After the demonstration, they were returned to CN and reverted to their original 2100–2103 numbers.

The model designation stood for HR - High Reliability, 616 - 6 axles, 16 cylinder engine. One notable feature was the HR616 debuted the CN designed "Draper Taper" cowl car body as well as #2119 was the first to feature a desktop style control stand.

The locomotives were retired from CN's fleet in the mid to late 1990s due to poor reliability (2105 was first due to wreck damage suffered near London, Ontario), and all units have been scrapped.

== See also ==
- List of MLW diesel locomotives
