= EMD F69PHAC =

Experimental North American diesel locomotive

- Amtrak 450 and 451, the only two F69PHAC units ever built, leading the demo ICE Train westward out of Galesburg, IL.
Type and origin
- Power type: Diesel
- Model: EMD F69PHAC
- Build date: June 1989
- Total produced: 2
Specifications
- Configuration
  - AAR: B-B
  - UIC: Bo'Bo'
- Gauge: 4 ft 8 1/2 in (1,435 mm) standard gauge
- Wheel diameter: 40in (1060mm)
- Length: 58 ft 2 in (17.73 m)
- Loco weight: 262,000 lb (118,841 kg)
- Fuel type: Diesel
- Fuel capacity: 1,800 US gal (6,800 L; 1,500 imp gal)
- Prime mover: EMD 12-710
- Engine type: Two-stroke diesel V12
- Aspiration: Turbocharged
- Traction motors: 1TB 2626-0TA02
- Head end power: 800 kW / 1000kVA inverter
- Cylinders: 12
- Gear ratio: 79:22
- Train brakes: Air
Performance figures
- Maximum speed: 110 mph (177 km/h)
- Power output: 3,000 hp (2.237 MW) (No HEP); 1,930 hp (1.439 MW) (Max HEP)
- Tractive effort
  - Starting: 62,000 lbs (276 kN)
  - Continuous: 50,000 lbs (222 kN)
Career
- Operators: US DOT
- Numbers: Amtrak 450–451
- Nicknames: Winnebago, Zephyr
- Locale: United States
- Retired: 1999
- Disposition: Both units sold to National Rail Equipment Co. in derelict condition.

The EMD F69PHAC was an experimental locomotive built in 1989 in a joint venture between EMD and Siemens. It was designed to test AC locomotive technology. Only two examples of this locomotive were made. The engine used the same carbody as the EMD F40PHM-2, with just a few spotting differences.

They were built for the United States Department of Transportation and loaned to Amtrak in 1990, sporting Phase III paint. They were returned to EMD and later used with the German ICE train demonstration that was on loan to Amtrak in 1992–1993. They were repainted in ICE paint. The two F69PHAC locomotives were again returned to EMD, where they were finally retired in 1999. Both of the locomotives still exist in a scrap yard, more specifically National Railway Equipment, in Mount Vernon, Illinois, stripped of numerous parts.
