= EMD FT36HCW-2 =

Model of American-built diesel locomotive used in South Korea

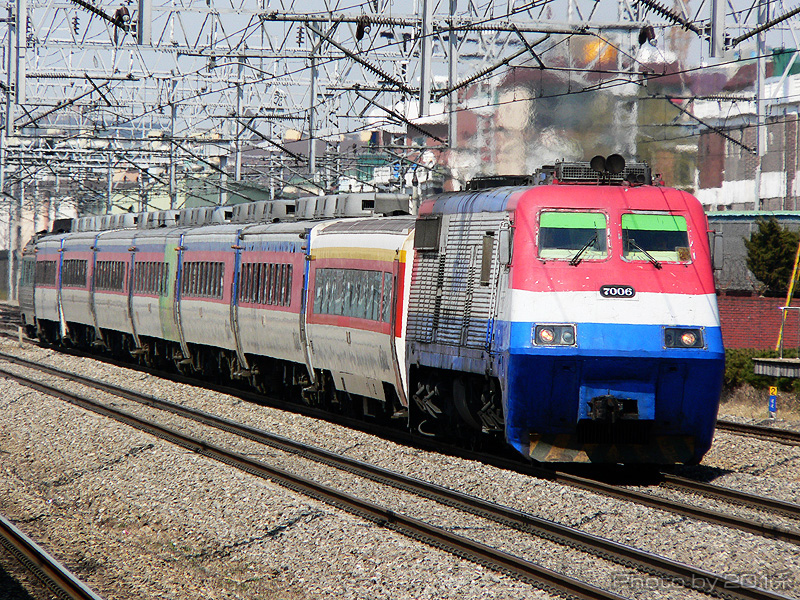
- FT36HCW-2 7006 running as a Mugunghwa train.
Type and origin
- Power type: Diesel–electric
- Designer: General Motors Electro-Motive Division
- Builder: Hyundai Rotem.
- Model: FT36HCW-2
- Build date: 1986-1987
- Total produced: 15
Specifications
- Configuration
  - AAR: C-C
  - UIC: Co'Co'
  - Commonwealth: Co-Co
- Gauge: 1,435 mm (4 ft 8 1/2 in)
- Trucks: 6-Wheel
- Wheel diameter: 1,016 mm (40.0 in)
- Minimum curve: 24°
- Wheelbase: 4,140 mm (13 ft 7 in) between axles in each truck
- Pivot centres: 13,260 mm (43 ft 6 in) between bolsters truck pivots
- Length: 20,982 mm (68 ft 10.1 in)
- Width: 3,150 mm (10 ft 4 in)
- Height: 4,000 mm (13 ft 1 in)
- Axle load: 19.6 tonnes (19.3 long tons; 21.6 short tons)
- Loco weight: 118 tonnes (116 long tons; 130 short tons)
- Fuel type: Diesel
- Fuel capacity: 6,400–12,100 L (1,400–2,700 imp gal; 1,700–3,200 US gal)
- Lubricant cap.: 920 L (200 imp gal; 240 US gal)
- Coolant cap.: 1,120 L (250 imp gal; 300 US gal)
- Sandbox cap.: 250 L (8.8 ft^{3})
- Prime mover: EMD 16-645E3 (originally 16-645F3B) (2 Stroke V Engine design)
- RPM range: 334-904
  - RPM low idle: 225
  - RPM idle: 316
  - Maximum RPM: 1000
- Engine type: V16 diesel engine
- Aspiration: Turbocharged & Supercharged (Optional)
- Alternator: GM D18
- Generator: Main: GM - AR6; Auxiliary: Delco A8102
- Traction motors: GM - D77 (6)
- Cylinders: 16
- Cylinder size: 229 mm (9.0 in) x 250 mm (9.8 in)
- Gear ratio: 57:20
- MU working: Yes
- Loco brake: Blended
- Train brakes: Westinghouse 24RL (Air Brake)
- Safety systems: ATS, ATP
Performance figures
- Maximum speed: 150 km/h (93 mph) ( 170 km/h (110 mph))
- Power output: 2,500 kW (3,400 hp) (originally 2,800 kW (3,800 hp))
- Tractive effort
  - Starting: 21,210 kgf (46,800 lbf) @ 25%
  - Continuous: 19,560 kgf (43,100 lbf) @ 19 km/h (12 mph)
Career
- Operators: Korail
- Class: 7000
- Numbers: 7001-7015
- Nicknames: "봉고:(Bongo)"
- Locale: South Korea
- First run: July 1986-July 1987
- Last run: 12 December 2011-9 November 2012
- Preserved: 1 (7001)
- Scrapped: 2015-2018

The EMD FT36CW-2, classified as the Class 7000 locomotive under Korail, was a Korean semi-high-speed diesel–electric locomotive. It was built to make the Saemaul Class trains more streamlined before the 1988 Olympics. The locomotives were built between 1986 and 1987 and were all retired between 2011 and 2012 when they reached the end of their 25-year lifespans.

== Specifications ==
The FT36HCW-2 is only capable of hauling passenger cars.

The braking system is of an electric type, unlike the air brakes used on the larger GT26CW and GT26CW-2 diesel-electric locomotives. However, dynamic braking was prohibited from use due to the aging of the traction motors.

The cab only had windows on one side of the train, so it was hard to see in the other side of the train. Therefore, the top speed when driving in slower speeds was limited to 25 km/h.

== History ==
- June 1986: Units 7001-7009 are introduced into service.
- July 1987: Units 7010-7015 are introduced into service. These units had several slight changes.
- 2011: Units 7001-7009 are retired. Unit 7001 is slated for preservation.
- November 28, 2012: Units 7010-7015 are retired.

== Modifications ==
The FT36HCW-2s were equipped with head-end power (HEP). However, the power supply caused many problems, and excessive noise and frequent maintenance led to the decision by Korail to remove HEP from the cars and instead use dynamo cars to provide the head-end power.

The locomotives also were originally powered by EMD 16-645F3B 3500-horsepower engines, but were eventually repowered with more efficient 3000-horsepower EMD 16-645E3 to satisfy passengers and customers.

The front coupler was initially housed, but was converted to an external convex to resolve efficiency problems.

== Trains and statuses ==
There were fifteen FT36HCW-2 locomotives, all of which were classified as Class 7000 locomotives. A detailed list of the fifteen units is below.

| Car Number | Retirement Year | Notes |
|---|---|---|
| 7001 | 2011 | Preserved by the Korea Railroad Cultural Heritage Committee. |
| 7002 | 2011 | Sold & scrapped in 2015 |
| 7003 | 2011 | Damaged in an accident at Jeonui station on June 21, 1990, as a Saemaeul train, but was repaired. Sold & scrapped in 2018 |
| 7004 | 2011 | Sold & scrapped in 2015 |
| 7005 | 2011 | Sold & scrapped in 2016 |
| 7006 | 2011 | Sold & scrapped in 2016 |
| 7007 | 2011 | Sold & scrapped in 2016 |
| 7008 | 2011 | Sold & scrapped in 2016 |
| 7009 | 2011 | Sold & scrapped in 2018 |
| 7010 | 2012 | Sold & scrapped in 2015 |
| 7011 | 2012 | Last unit in service, on November 28, 2012. Sold & scrapped in 2015 |
| 7012 | 2012 | Sold & scrapped in 2018 |
| 7013 | 2012 | Involved in an accident on the Daegu line on June 14, 2008, as a Mugunghwa train, but was repaired. Sold & scrapped in 2018 |
| 7014 | 2012 | Sold & scrapped in 2015 |
| 7015 | 2012 | Sold & scrapped in 2015 |
