= GE P30CH =

American diesel locomotive

- A duo of GE P30CH locomotives with no. 723 leading Amtrak's Sunset Limited at El Paso in January 1982
Type and origin
- Power type: Diesel-electric
- Builder: GE Transportation Systems
- Model: P30CH
- Build date: 1975–76
- Total produced: 25
Specifications
- Configuration
  - AAR: C-C
  - UIC: Co′Co′
- Gauge: 4 ft 8 1/2 in (1,435 mm) standard gauge
- Trucks: GE 3-axle floating bolster
- Wheel diameter: 40 in (1,016 mm)
- Minimum curve: 29° (199.70 ft or 60.87 m)
- Wheelbase: Locomotive: 46 ft (14.02 m); Truck: 13 ft 7 in (4.14 m)
- Length: 72 ft 4 in (22.05 m)
- Width: 10 ft 8.8 in (3.27 m)
- Height: 15 ft 4 1/2 in (4.69 m)
- Axle load: 64,333 lb (29,181 kg)
- Adhesive weight: 100%
- Loco weight: 386,000 lb (175,087 kg)
- Fuel type: Diesel
- Fuel capacity: 3,600 US gal (14,000 L; 3,000 imp gal)
- Lubricant cap.: 380 US gal (1,400 L; 320 imp gal)
- Water cap.: 385 US gal (1,460 L; 321 imp gal)
- Sandbox cap.: 56 cu ft (1.59 m^{3})
- Prime mover: GE 7FDL16
- RPM range: 450-1050
- Engine type: V16 diesel
- Aspiration: Turbocharged
- Displacement: 175.2 liters (10,690 cu in)
- Alternator: GTA11
- Traction motors: 6x GE 752 DC traction motors
- Cylinders: 16
- Cylinder size: 10.95 liters (668 cu in)
- Transmission: 75:28 gearing
- MU working: Yes
- Train heating: Locomotive-supplied head-end power rated at 750 kW
- Loco brake: Pneumatic (26L) & Dynamic
- Train brakes: Pneumatic
Performance figures
- Maximum speed: 103 mph (166 km/h)
- Power output: 3,000 hp (2,200 kW)
- Tractive effort: 58,980 lbf (262 kN) @ 14.7 mph (23.7 km/h)
Career
- Operators: Amtrak, some leased to SP
- Nicknames: Pooch
- Last run: 1991
- Disposition: All scrapped

The GE P30CH was one of the first brand-new diesel-electric locomotives built for Amtrak by General Electric during Amtrak's early years. The design was based on the GE U30C, but had a cowl carbody like its EMD competitors. Amtrak operated them between 1975 and 1992.

== History ==
Amtrak ordered 25 P30CHs in 1974, following up on its order of 40 EMD SDP40Fs in 1973 to replace Amtrak's inherited fleet of F and E units which were old and weren't equipped with HEP (head end power). The designation "P30CH" stood for the following: "P" for passenger service, "30" for the 3,000 horsepower V16 GE 7FDL diesel engine, "C" for C-C wheel arrangement, and "H" for head-end power. This designation led to the units being nicknamed "Pooch".

The P30CH was the first Amtrak diesel locomotive built from the factory to offer HEP (head end power) in the form of 2 Detroit Diesel generator sets, each rated at 375 kW for a combined total of 750 kW.

The six-axle P30CHs, which cost Amtrak $480,000 each, were plagued with mechanical problems and were never very popular with crews or Amtrak management, due to a lack of climate control, excessive noise, frequent failure of head end power generators, and rough riding stemming from the six axle wheel arrangement. With one recorded instance of a window being shaken out of its frame and striking a crewman. In the mid-1970s Amtrak moved away from six-axle designs in favor of four-axle units; four-axle locomotives could better handle routes with numerous curves. Ultimately the four-axle EMD F40PHs quickly began to supersede the P30CHs soon after their introduction by Amtrak.

Amtrak leased fifteen to the Southern Pacific Railroad in 1978 for use on the Peninsula Commute between San Francisco and San Jose, California. Caltrans leased several P30CHs for its abortive Oxnard–Los Angeles "CalTrain" commuter service.

Two units were wrecked prior to official retirement. In 1977, P30CH no. 713 was involved in a collision with some log trucks. In 1979 P30CH no. 715 was involved in a collision with an Illinois Central freight train.

In the later years of their Amtrak careers, the locomotives were used regularly into the mid-1980s on the Sunset Limited and Auto Train routes. With the introduction of the Genesis series and the Dash 8-32BWH series, the P30CHs had their final runs in late 1991; 722, on May 15, 1991, just prior to retirement, was used in an Operation Lifesaver crash test in Potomac Yard in Virginia.

== Roster ==
GE produced 25 P30CHs, all of which were delivered to Amtrak:

Original Owner	Road Numbers	Quantity	Builder Numbers	Notes
Amtrak	700-724	25	40694-40718	15 units leased to Southern Pacific in 1978. No. 713 wrecked and retired after a grade crossing accident in 1977. No. 715 wrecked and retired after being involved in the Harvey, Illinois train collision All scrapped by 1992.
