= EMD F40PH =

North American diesel locomotive class

EMD F40PH / F40PHR
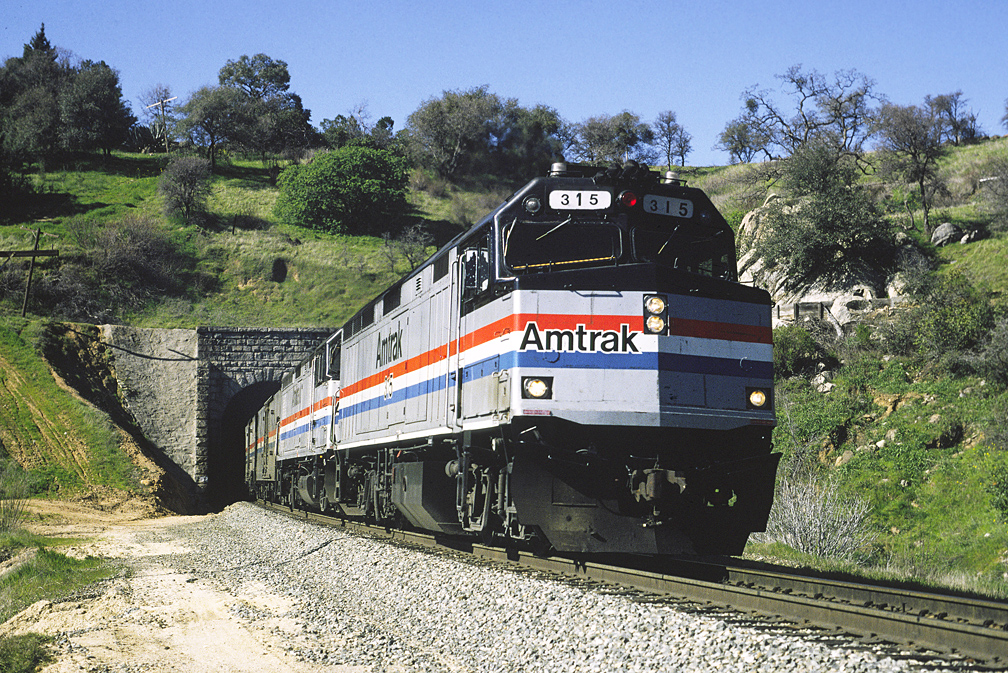
- Amtrak No. 315 F40PHR on the eastbound California Zephyr at Tunnel No. 17 near Newcastle, California in 1995
Type and origin
- Power type: Diesel-electric
- Builder: GM Electro-Motive Division (EMD); General Motors Diesel (GMD); Morrison-Knudsen (MK); MotivePower (MPI)
- Build date: 1975–1992 (EMD); 1988–2007 (MK / MPI)
- Total produced: 475 (EMD); 31 (MK / MPI)
Specifications
- Configuration
  - AAR: B-B
  - UIC: Bo'Bo'
- Gauge: 4 ft 8 1/2 in (1,435 mm) standard gauge
- Trucks: Blomberg M
- Length: 56 ft 2 in (17.12 m)
- Width: 10 ft 7 in (3.23 m)
- Height: 15 ft 7.5 in (4.763 m)
- Loco weight: 260,000–282,000 lb (118,000–128,000 kg)
- Prime mover: EMD 16-645E3
- Engine type: V16 Diesel
- Aspiration: Turbocharged
- Alternator: AR10/D14
- Traction motors: D77
- Cylinders: 16
- MU working: AAR
- Loco brake: Air, Dynamic
- Train brakes: Air
- Couplers: Knuckle
Performance figures
- Maximum speed: 103–110 mph (166–177 km/h)
- Power output: 3,000–3,200 hp (2.2–2.4 MW)

The EMD F40PH is a four-axle 3,000–3,200 hp (2.2–2.4 MW) B-B diesel-electric locomotive built by General Motors Electro-Motive Division in several variants from 1975 to 1992. Intended for use on Amtrak's short-haul passenger routes, it became the backbone of Amtrak's diesel fleet after the failure of the EMD SDP40F. The F40PH also found widespread use on commuter railroads in the United States and with VIA Rail in Canada. Additional F40PH variants were manufactured by Morrison-Knudsen and MotivePower between 1988 and 2007, mostly rebuilt from older locomotives.

Amtrak retired its fleet of F40PHs in the early-2000s in favor of the GE Genesis, but the locomotive remains the mainstay of VIA Rail's long-distance trains; a depiction of the locomotive hauling The Canadian is featured on the reverse of the Frontier series Canadian $10 bill. The F40PHs are still a common sight on many other commuter railroads throughout the United States. In addition, Amtrak has kept 22 of its F40PHs in use as non-powered control units.

== Background ==
Amtrak inherited an aging and mechanically incompatible fleet of diesel locomotives from various private railroads on its startup in 1971. The most modern locomotives remained in private hands for freight service, or to operate the various commuter services which, by law, did not pass to Amtrak. To replace these Amtrak ordered 150 EMD SDP40F locomotives, which began entering service in 1973. These were supplemented by 25 GE P30CHs which entered service in 1975. The SDP40F was a troubled design; problems with weight distribution led to a series of derailments in the mid-1970s. Meanwhile, the poor truck design of the P30CH (and the electric GE E60CP) curtailed further orders of that unit when Amtrak found itself needing more short- and medium-distance power in the spring of 1975.

== Design ==
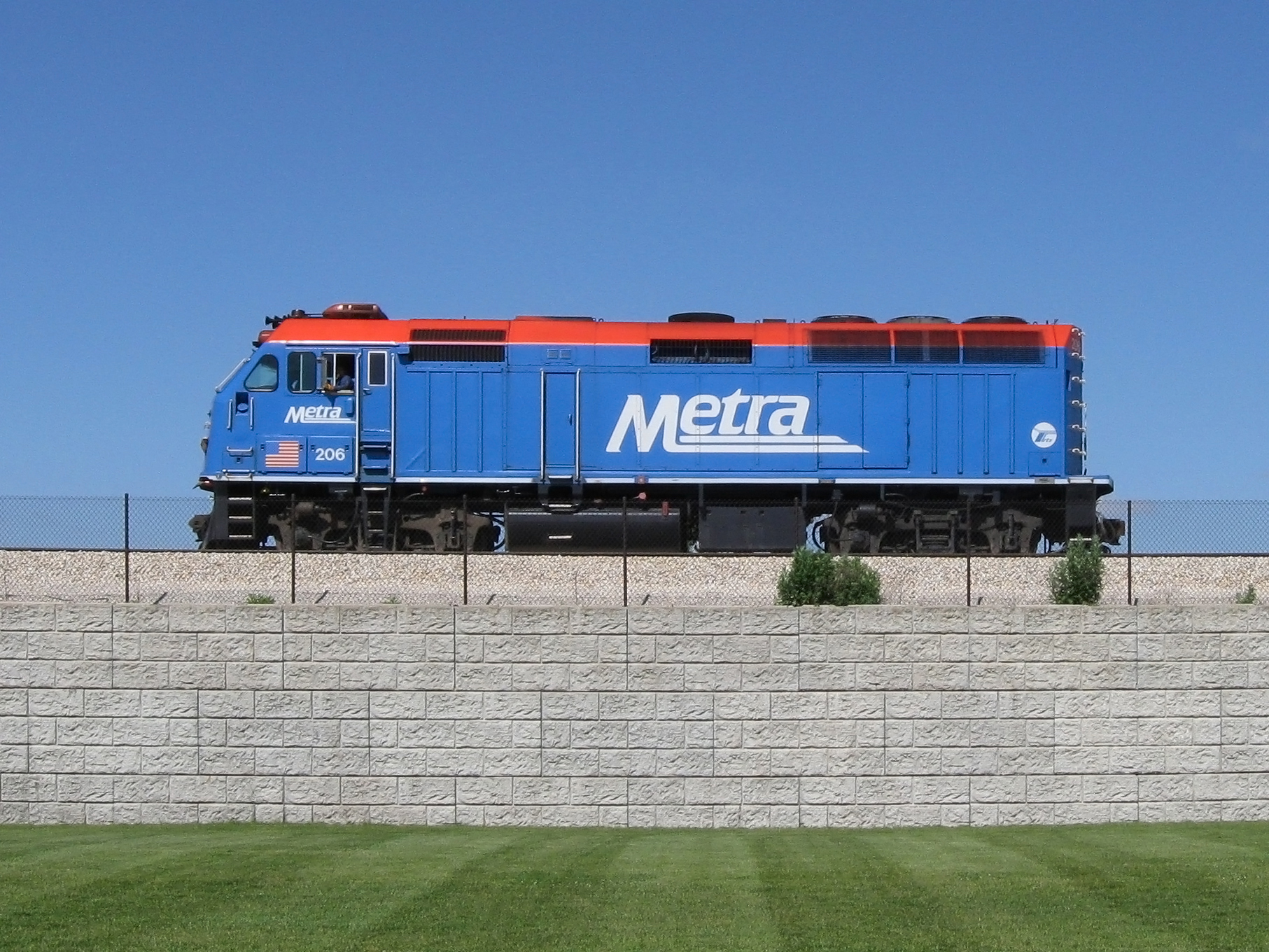
Metra EMD F40PHM-2 No. 206 near Stuart Field in Chicago, Illinois

The design of the F40PH was based on the EMD GP40-2 freight road switcher locomotive and shared that locomotive's turbocharged EMD 645E3 V16 cylinder, two-stroke, water-cooled diesel engine (prime mover). The prime mover developed 3,000 hp (2.2 MW) at 893 RPM. The main (traction) generator converts mechanical energy from the prime mover into electricity distributed through a high voltage cabinet to the traction motors. Each of the four traction motors is geared to a driving wheel; the gear ratio determines the maximum speed of the locomotive. A standard F40PH has a gear ratio of 57:20, permitting a maximum speed of 103 mph (166 km/h). Some Amtrak F40PHs were delivered with a 56:21 gearing for 110 mph (177 km/h). The first 30 locomotives were built with a 1,500-US-gallon (5,700 L; 1,200 imp gal) fuel tank. Subsequent units were built with a 1,800-US-gallon (6,800 L; 1,500 imp gal) tank. Beginning with the EMD F40PH-2, introduced by Caltrain in 1985, the prime mover developed 3,200 horsepower (2.4 MW). Many of the original F40PHs were updated to match that output. The locomotives are 56 feet 2 inches (17.12 m) long. A standard F40PH weighs 260,000 lb (120,000 kg).

For passenger service the F40PH has another electrical alternator, the head-end power (HEP) generator. The HEP unit generates three-phase AC power at 480 V (500 kW on the first order, 800 kW on later units) for lighting, heating and air-conditioning the train. Originally, F40PHs powered the HEP alternator from the prime mover. As a result of that, the train had to be at a constant 60 Hz frequency, and the prime mover had to turn at a constant 893 RPM while supplying head end power (even standing still, with the throttle in idle). Power to the traction motors was controlled by varying the field excitation of the main (traction) generator. On some later versions of the F40PH (and on many rebuilt F40s), an auxiliary diesel engine at the rear of the locomotive powers the HEP alternator. In these engines, the prime-mover speed varies in the usual way. They can be identified by the diesel exhaust at the rear of the locomotive and by their quiet idle. Remaining F40s, with the constant-RPM prime movers, are noticeably louder.

In the initial design the battery box and air reservoirs were located forward of the fuel tank. In locomotives manufactured after 1977 these were relocated behind the tank. The battery box returned to its original location in the F40PH-2. The F40PH-2s delivered to Caltrain incorporated Southern Pacific Railroad-style headlights.

The designation "F40PH" stood for the following: "F" for the full-width cowl carbody, "40" as the locomotive is part of EMD's 40-series (based on the GP40-2 freight locomotive), "P" for passenger service, and "H" for head-end power.

== History ==
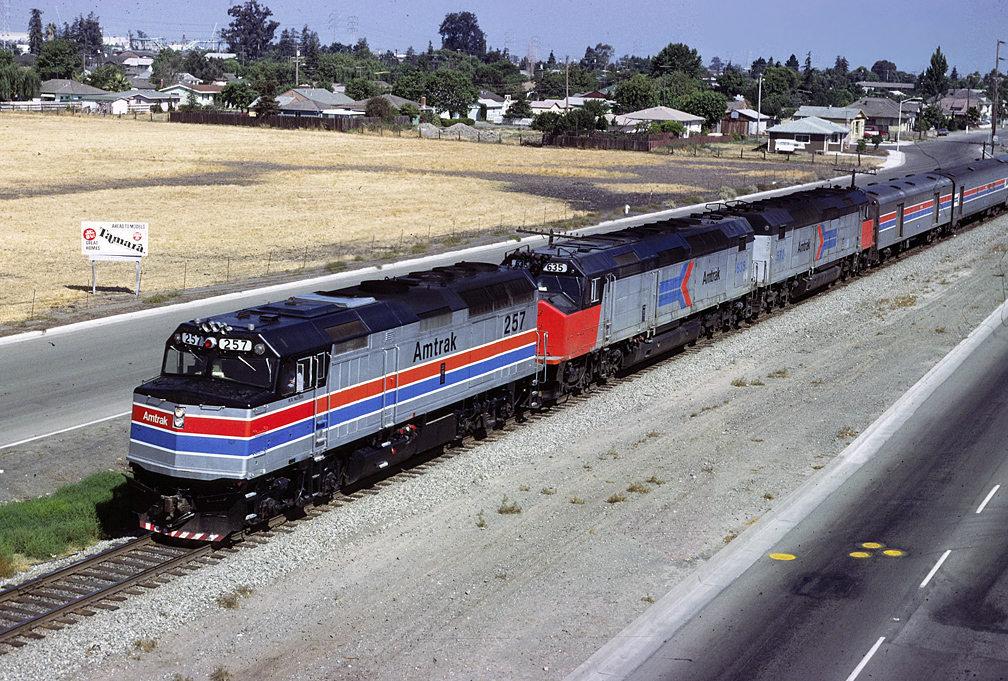
Amtrak EMD F40PHR No. 257 leading the Coast Starlight at Agnew, California, in 1980, followed by a pair of EMD SDP40Fs

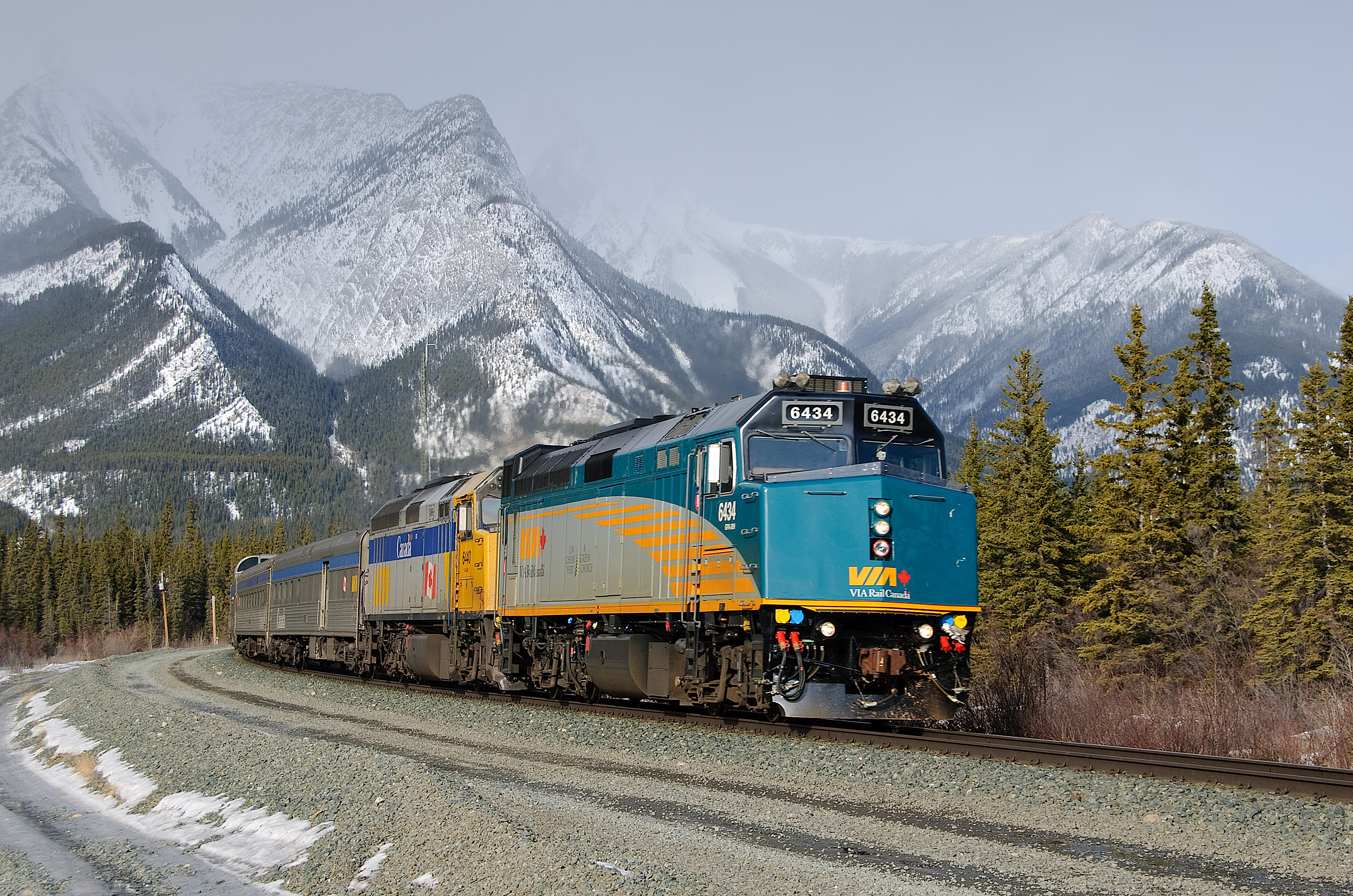
Rebuilt VIA Rail F40PH-2D No. 6434 leading the Canadian near Jasper, Alberta, in 2011, with an original unit following

Amtrak ordered its first 30 EMD F40PHs on May 8, 1975. The first of the new locomotives entered service on April 9, 1976. Amtrak intended the locomotives for short routes such as the San Diegan in California and Northeast Corridor services in the then non-electrified route portion between New Haven, Connecticut, and Boston, Massachusetts.

The long-distance routes were served by the then-new EMD SDP40F, described by J. David Ingles in late 1975 as the "stars of Amtrak's long-distance trains". However, two events led to a major change in thinking within Amtrak regarding the SDP40F. The first event was a sharp decline in the mechanical reliability of the SDP40F, including several derailments. The second event was the unusually harsh winter of 1976–1977, which sidelined many of Amtrak's aging steam-heated coaches. Amtrak suspended numerous routes and pressed the new HEP-equipped Amfleet I coaches, designed for short runs, into service. The F40PH, with its built-in HEP generator, was the natural choice to haul these coaches. As problems with the EMD SDP40F mounted, Amtrak adopted the F40PH as its long-term solution nationwide for diesel engine service.

In the spring of 1977 Amtrak traded 40 EMD SDP40Fs back to EMD. Components including the prime mover were installed into an EMD F40PH frame. The 40 rebuilt locomotives, designated F40PHR, were identical to new-build EMD F40PHs, incorporating the larger fuel tank and more powerful HEP generator which had become standard.

Amtrak ultimately acquired 132 F40PHRs in this manner — which combined with new orders between 1975 and 1988 and with the purchase of six GMD F40PHs from GO Transit in 1990 — led to a fleet of 216 locomotives, the country's largest fleet. (Note: Graham-White and Weil do not list Nos. 401–409 as F40PHRs; this is contradicted by Cook, Simon and Warner, Holland, and Lloyd.)

The first commuter rail operator to order F40PHs was Chicago's Regional Transportation Authority (RTA), a forerunner to Metra, who ordered 74 between 1977 and 1983. Metra ordered 41 more between 1988 and 1992. Other agencies who bought the F40PH included the Massachusetts Bay Transit Authority (MBTA) (18), Caltrain (20), GO Transit (6), New Jersey Transit (17), and VIA Rail (59). Finally, the rail construction firm Speno ordered four. In total EMD built 449 locomotives, including the F40PHR trade-ins. Metra F40PM-2 No. 214, completed in 1992, was the final locomotive EMD manufactured at La Grange, Illinois.

The F40PH performed well for Amtrak: at the start of the 1990s only four had been retired due to wrecks. The locomotive was at the center of Amtrak's advertising. Trains magazine estimated that on average, each F40PH traveled as many as 175,000 miles (282,000 km) a year.

Amtrak began replacing the F40PH with the GE Dash 8-32BWH in 1991, the GE P40DC in 1993, and the GE P42DC in 1996. All were retired by 2001 with the arrival of the last P42DC, and their last regular assignment was on the Maple Leaf in December 2001. The Panama Canal Railway acquired several ex-Amtrak F40PHs for both freight and passenger service; the 480 V head-end power matched the voltage used by the refrigeration in Maersk Sealand containers.

The EMD F40PH has continued to serve VIA Rail into the 21st century: between 2007 and 2012 VIA refurbished its entire fleet for CAD$100 million. The rebuild program included separate HEP generators, overhauled engines, a third headlight addition, cab reconditioning, additional safety horns at the front, and repainting into the newer VIA scheme. Rebuilt locomotive No. 6403, pulling the Canadian through the Rocky Mountains, was included on the back of the redesigned Canadian ten-dollar note in 2013 (The actual 6403 was later renumbered to 6459.) As of 2018, VIA has 53 such EMD F40PH locomotives in service. VIA started another round of rebuilding for 39 F40PH-2D locomotives in 2024, with the goal of extending their lifespan to 2035. These F40PH locomotives are now supplemented by GE P42DC locomotives delivered in 2001 and by Siemens SCV-42 locomotives delivered in 2023.

== Variants ==
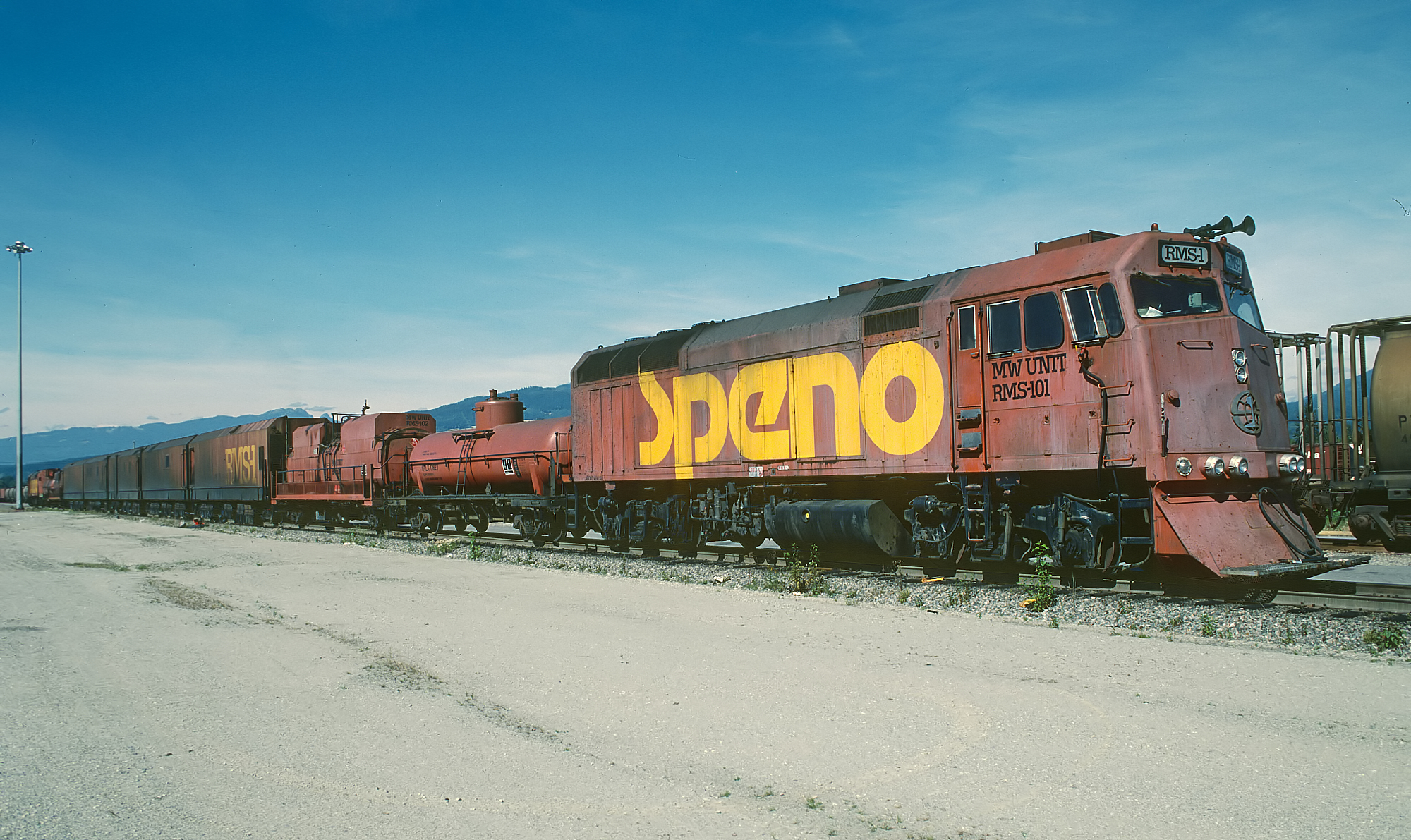
Speno EMD F40PH-2M No. 101 at Coquitlam, British Columbia in 1987

The longevity of the F40PH has led to numerous conversions, rebuildings, and remanufacturings. In some instances new locomotives were assembled using EMD components. Several transit agencies lengthened their locomotives to include a separate HEP generator. These were designated F40PH-2C and F40PH-2CAT where Cummins and Caterpillar generators were used, respectively. The F40PH-2C was considerably heavier than the standard design, weighing 282,000 lb (128,000 kg). The F40PH-2D, employed by Via Rail, had special customizations for operating in Canada, including ditch lights. Metra's last 30 locomotives, designated F40PHM-2 (now rebuilt as F40PHM-3), were built with a sloped cab similar to the experimental EMD F69PHAC. The streamlined appearance acquired the nickname "Winnebago." Speno's four locomotives, designated F40PH-2M, were delivered without turbochargers, limiting power output to 2,000 horsepower (1,500 kW). The five EMD GP40 locomotives Morrison-Knudsen rebuilt for Tri-Rail in 1988 were designated F40PHL-2. Progress Rail rebuilt 41 Metra units with remanufactured engines, rebuilt traction motors and microprocessor traction control. These have been designated the F40PH-3. The MBTA's dozen F40PHM-2C locomotives were built new by MotivePower using EMD components, as were the six F40PH-3C locomotives of the Altamont Commuter Express. The MBTA's F40PH-2C and F40PHM-2 locomotives were later rebuilt by MotivePower into F40PH-3C locomotives starting in 2019.

In 2023–2024, Rolling Stock Solutions, an American locomotive leasing company, rebuilt 12 ex-Amtrak F40PH locomotives for leasing to commuter rail operators and dubbed them the F40PH-4C. These claim to feature a remanufactured Tier 0+ prime mover (EMD 16-645E3B) and a separate Tier 4 HEP generator, as well as microprocessor controls. These entered service with the MBTA in early 2026.

=== Conversion to cab cars ===
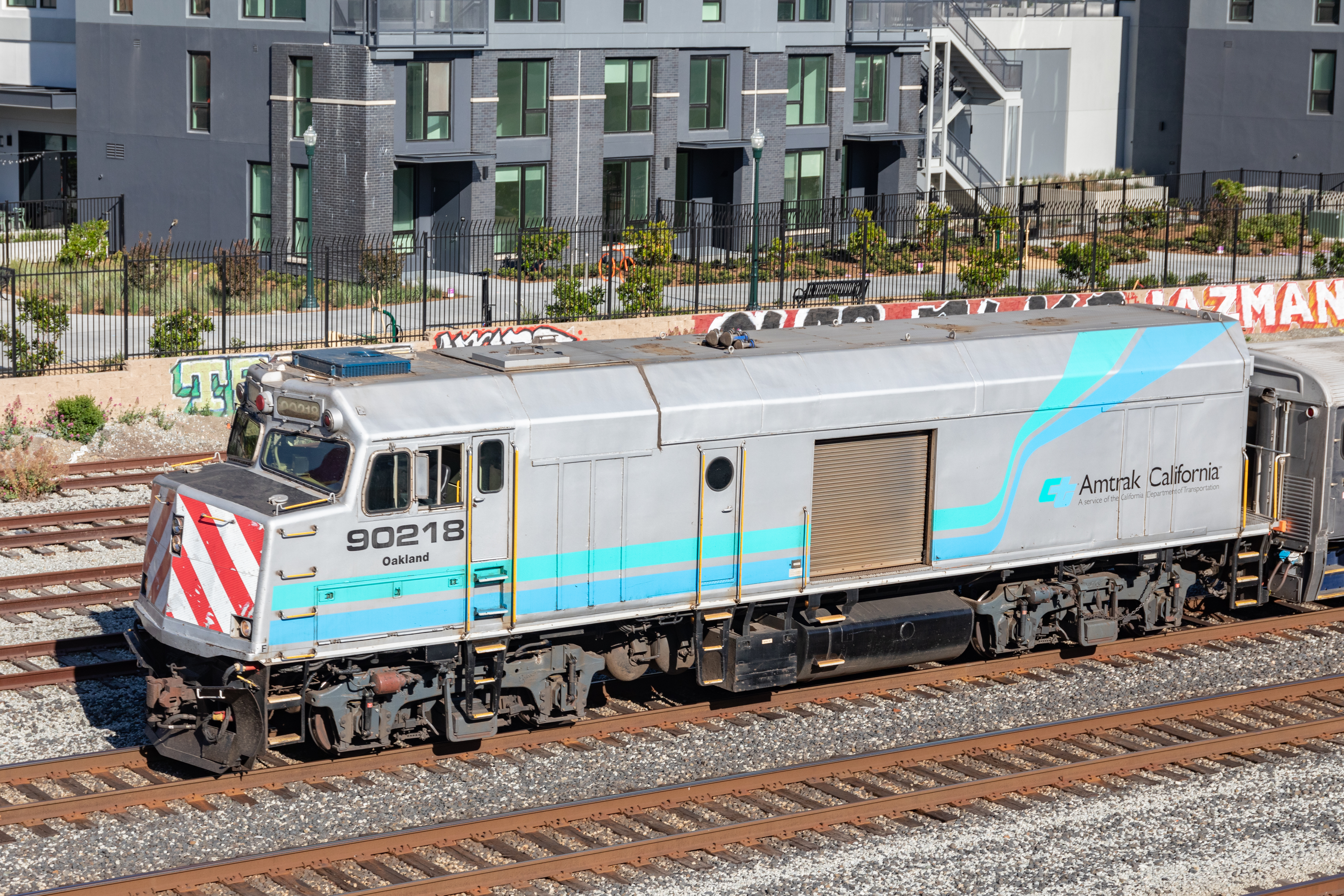
Amtrak NPCU No. 90218 on the Gold Runner

As Amtrak's F40PH fleet was replaced by newer GE Genesis-series locomotives, Amtrak converted a number of the retired units into baggage/cab cars. Colloquially known as "cabbages" (a portmanteau of "cab" and "baggage"), and officially known as Non-Powered Control Units (NPCUs), these units had their diesel engines, traction motors, and main alternators removed, as well as a large roll-up door installed in the side (allowing the former engine compartment to be used for baggage). Amtrak converted 22 locomotives into cabbage cars between 1996 and 2007. Each converted unit was renumbered by prefixing "90" to its original number. In 2011, Amtrak converted F40PH No. 406 (later renumbered 90406) to an NPCU to enable push-pull operation of Amtrak's 40th-anniversary exhibit train; in addition, a HEP generator was installed to supply auxiliary power. However, unlike other NPCUs, it resembles an operational F40PH externally.

=== Conversion to freight locomotives ===
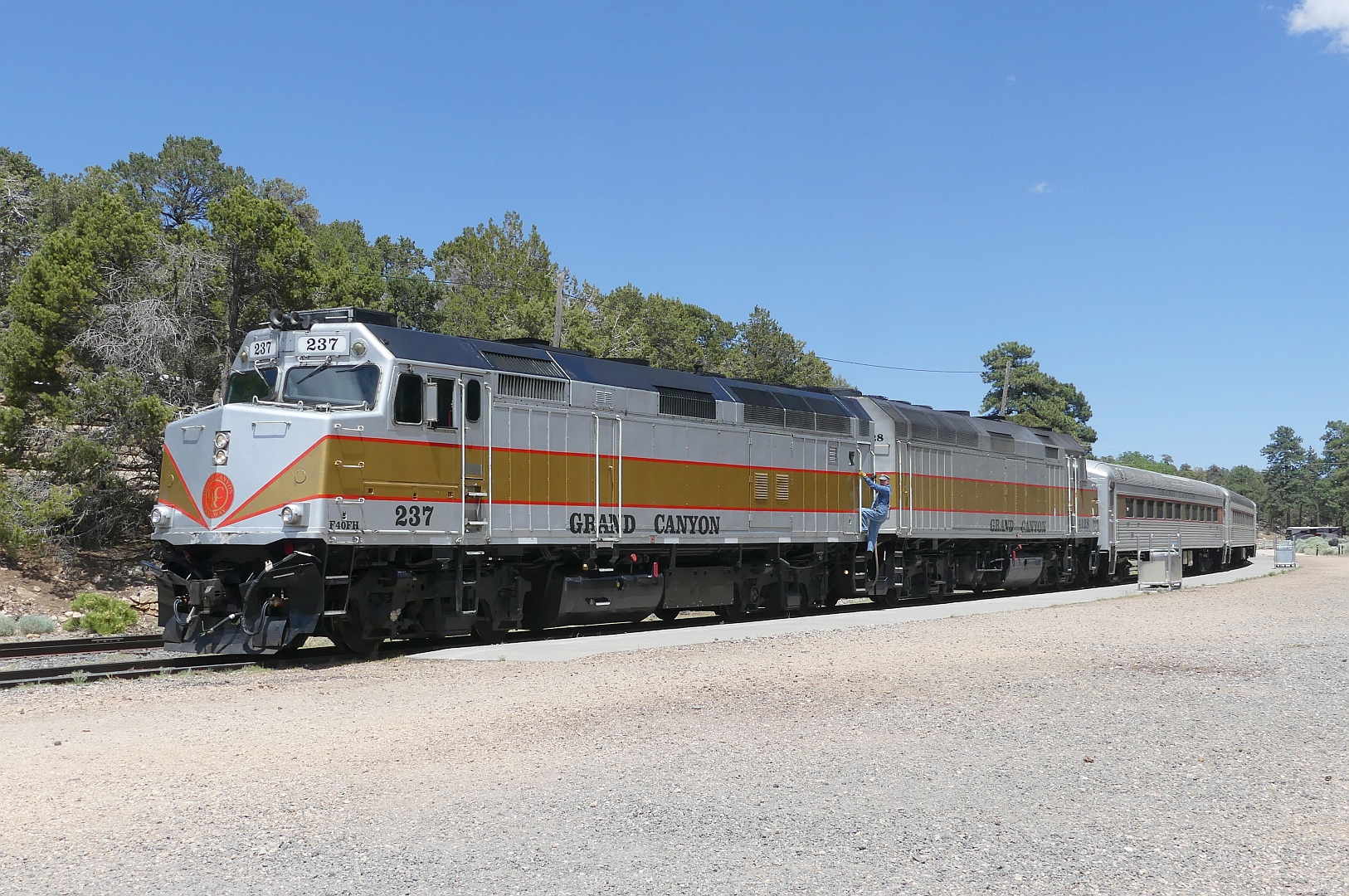
F40PH locomotives Nos. 237 and 4128, rebuilt as F40FHs by the Grand Canyon Railway, at the Grand Canyon Village, 2022

Some F40PHs found their way into freight service, after suitable modifications. The F40M-2F, which ran on the Canadian American Railroad and later the San Luis and Rio Grande Railroad, was regeared for a maximum speed of 65 miles per hour (105 km/h) and given an enlarged 2,900 US gallons (11,000 L; 2,400 imp gal) fuel tank. It was also fitted with a door, platform, and steps at the front. One unit, No. 450, was acquired by Western Maryland Scenic Railroad in 2018.

In the early 2000s, three retired F40PHRs (Nos. 237, 239, and 295) were purchased by the Grand Canyon Railway for use in pulling their passenger excursion trains between Williams, Arizona and the South Rim of the Grand Canyon National Park. To better accommodate the railway's 3%-grades, the three locomotives were rebuilt with Caterpillar HEP generators, and they were regeared for a gear ratio of 62:15. The modifications lowered their top speeds and increased their tractive effort by 18,000 pounds-force (80 kN), and they were redesignated as F40FH units—the second "F" for their freight speeds. By 2010, the F40FHs replaced the railway's MLW FPA-4s in their daily passenger schedules, and they later acquired two more F40PHs (Nos. 4124 and 4128) from NJ Transit in 2017. As of 2026, the Grand Canyon Railway owns eight F40s, one of which is planned to be rebuilt into a battery-electric unit, to reduce environmental emissions and to reduce costs for fuel and maintenance.

== Original owners ==
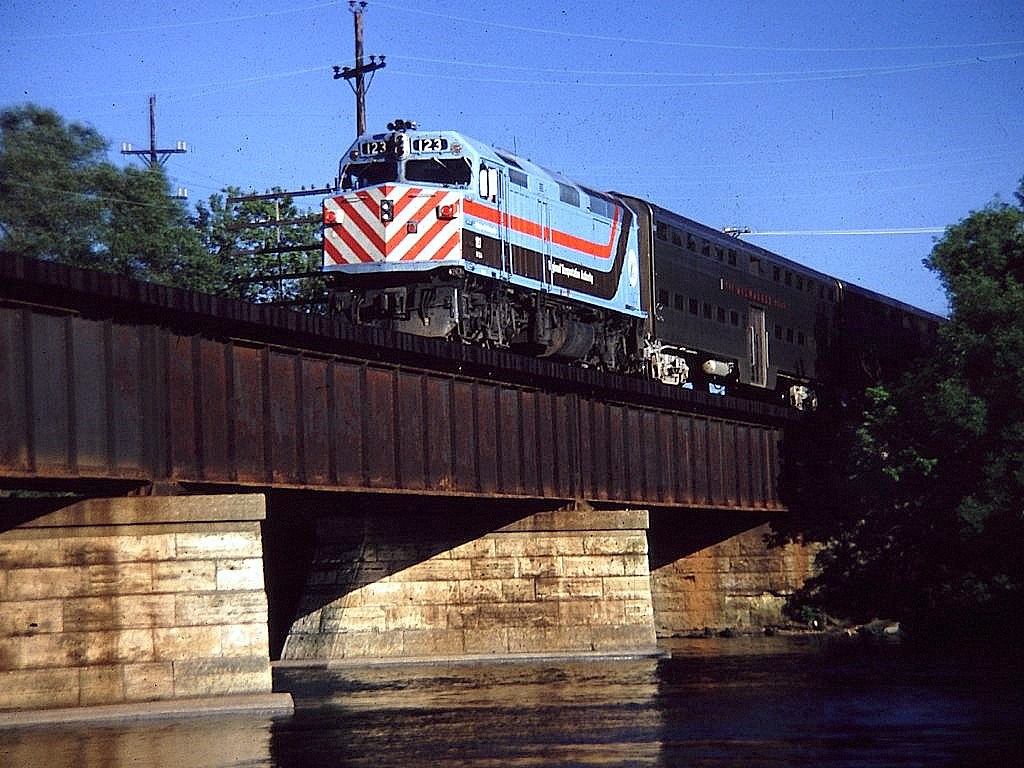
RTA EMD F40PH No. 123 crossing the Fox River in Elgin, Illinois in 1981

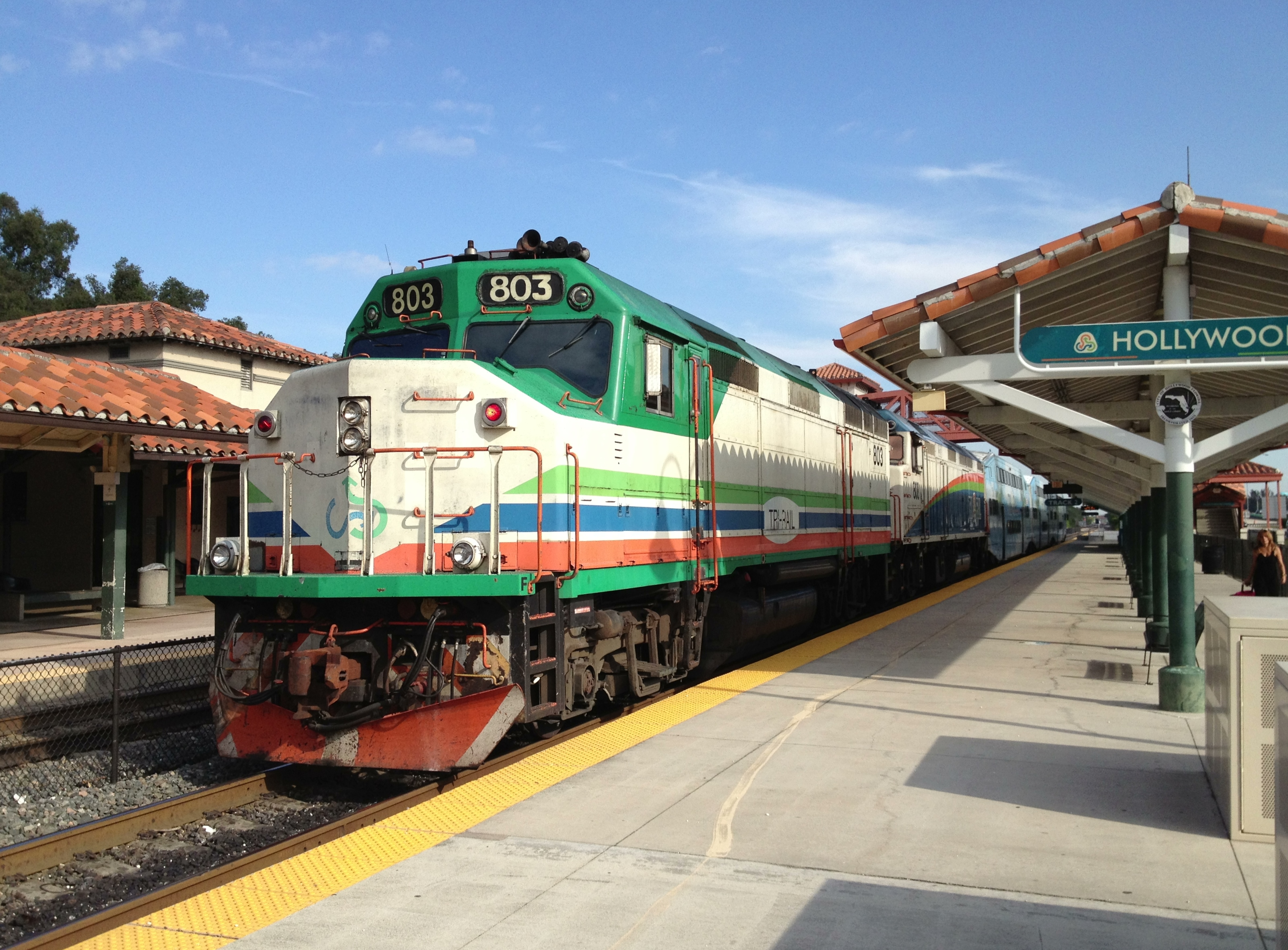
Tri-Rail M-K F40PHL-2 No. 803 at Hollywood station in 2013

Electro-Motive Division manufactured 475 F40PHs of all types between 1975 and 1992. The orders for GO Transit and VIA Rail Canada were built by General Motors Diesel (GMD), the company's Canadian subsidiary. Morrison-Knudsen (M-K) and its successor MotivePower (MPI) remanufactured another 30 locomotives between 1988 and 2000, with one final F40PH, ACEX 3106, being built for the Altamont Corridor Express in 2006.

Railroad	Model	Quantity	Road numbers
Altamont Corridor Express	MPI F40PH-3C	6	3101–3106
Amtrak	EMD F40PH	78	200–229; 270–279; 300–309; 332–359
Amtrak	EMD F40PHR	132	230–269; 280–299; 310–331; 360–400; 401–409
Caltrain	EMD F40PH-2	20	900–919
Caltrain	MPI F40PH-2C	3	920–922
Coaster	M-K F40PHM-2C	5	2101–2105
GO Transit	GMD F40PH	6	510–515
Massachusetts Bay Transportation Authority	EMD F40PH	18	1000–1017
Massachusetts Bay Transportation Authority	EMD F40PH-2C	26	1050–1075
Massachusetts Bay Transportation Authority	M-K F40PHM-2C	12	1025–1036
Metra	EMD F40PH-2	11	174–184
Metra	EMD F40PHM-2	30	185–214
NJ Transit	EMD F40PH	17	4113–4129
Regional Transportation Authority	EMD F40PH	74	100–173
Speno	EMD F40PH-2M	4	S1–S4
Tri-Rail	M-K F40PHL-2	5	801–805
Tri-Rail	M-K F40PH-2C	3	807–809
VIA Rail	GMD F40PH-2	59	6400–6458
Total		509	

== Preservation ==
Five ex-Amtrak F40PHs have been preserved:

- No. 231 at the Illinois Railway Museum (formerly owned by Dynamic Rail Preservation)
- No. 281 at the California State Railroad Museum
- No. 307 at the North Carolina Transportation Museum
- No. 315 at the Nevada State Railroad Museum
- No. 396 (later Metrolink no. 800) at the Southern California Railway Museum

Two Coaster F40PHM-2C locomotives have been preserved: No. 2103 at the Pacific Southwest Railway Museum and No. 2105 at the Southern California Railway Museum. As of July 2025, Caltrain F40PH-2CAT No. 919 is planned to be donated to the Midwest Overland Rail Preservation Society.

== See also ==
- List of EMD locomotives
- List of GMD Locomotives
