= GE U30C =

Diesel-electric locomotive

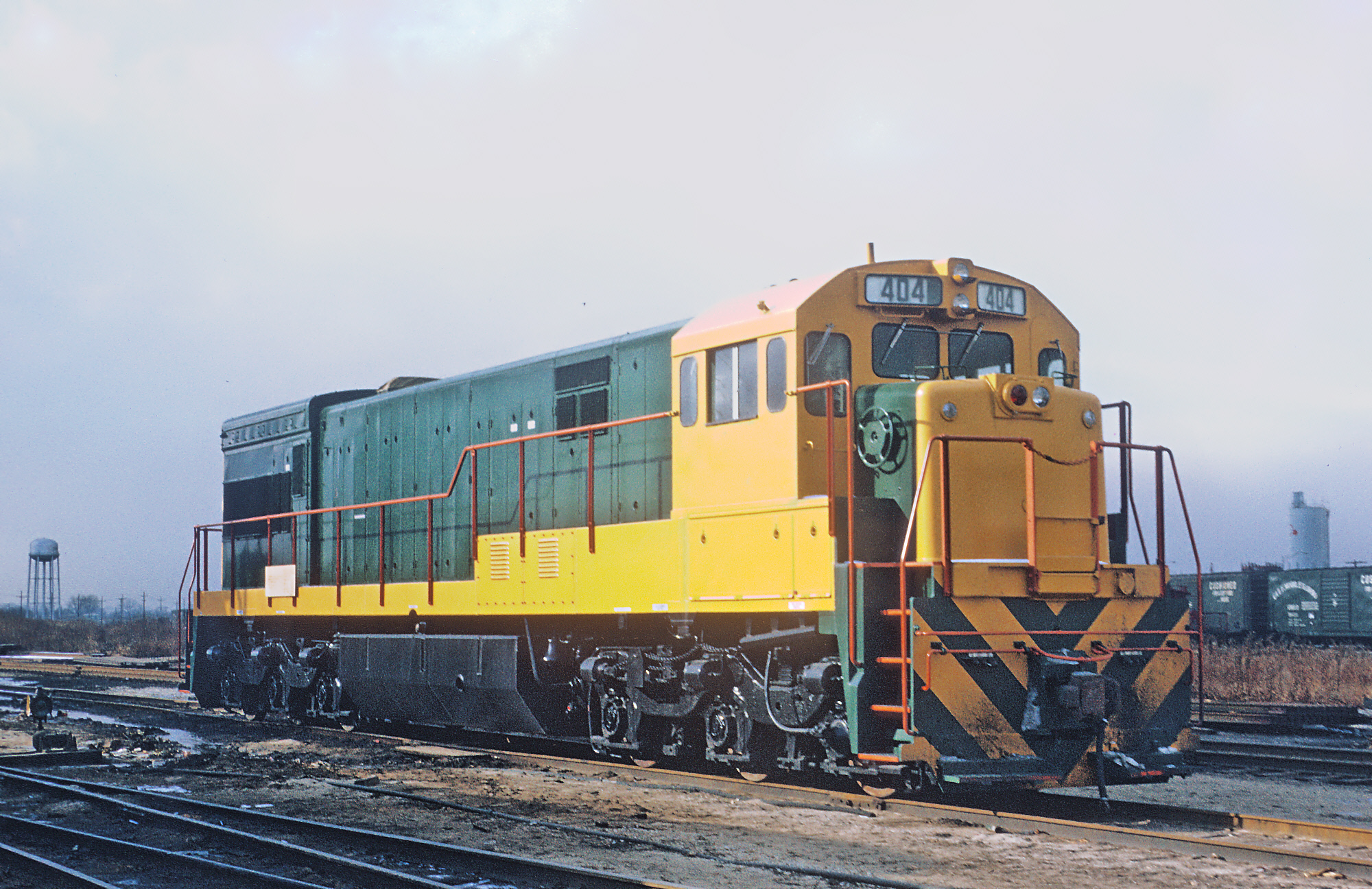
- Ferrocarril del Pacífico new GE U30C at GM&O Glenn Yard, Chicago, IL on way to delivery on December 22, 1969
Type and origin
- Power type: Diesel-electric
- Builder: GE Transportation Systems
- Model: U30C
- Build date: November 1966 – October 1976
- Total produced: 600 (plus 6 U30CG)
Specifications
- Configuration
  - AAR: C-C
  - UIC: Co'Co'
- Gauge: 4 ft 8 1/2 in (1,435 mm) standard gauge
- Length: 67 feet 3 inches (20.50 m)
- Prime mover: GE 7FDL-16
Performance figures
- Power output: 3,000 hp (2,200 kW)
Career
- Locale: North America
- Disposition: most scrapped, six preserved, others rebuilt into the GE Super 7 Program

The GE U30C is a six-axle locomotive built by General Electric from 1966 to 1976. With 600 units sold, the U30C proved to be a viable alternative for customers who were unable to purchase SD40s from Electro-Motive Diesel (EMD) due to production backlog. Throughout its ten-year production span, the U30C was known for reliability issues concerning its electrical system. However, most railroads were assured of the reliability of the GE Model 752 DC traction motor and began to place orders for U30Cs starting in 1966. When production ended, the last U30Cs carried pre-Dash 7 specifications, which would be carried in its replacement, the GE C30-7.

The U30C served customers of all kinds, from mining to general freights, coal trains, and even as a power source unit for the Department of Transportation's subway-car test tracks in Pueblo, Colorado before a connection from the commercial electric power grid could be established (Cudahy 1979).

Not to be outdone in the freight sector, GE produced a passenger version of the locomotive, the GE U30CG. The U30CG only sold six units for the Atchison, Topeka & Santa Fe Railway.

When most U30Cs were being retired due to old age and mechanical or electrical problems, General Electric initiated a rebuild program where older Universal Series locomotives would be upgraded with the latest technology and fuel-saving systems. GE would then strip the locomotive down to its frame and engine and completely rebuild the locomotive with new components. When completed, the unit would receive a new designation: GE C30-S7R (R for Rebuilt frame of traded-in locomotive). In the later years, the rebuild frame was discontinued, and a brand-new frame would be used, re-designating the locomotive as GE C30-S7N (N for New frame). The only external difference was a large vent on the fireman's side ahead of the engine compartment. The final variation came with the discontinued frame of the Universal series and instead, using GE C40-8 kits. This new model also featured a microprocessor, officially designating this locomotive as GE C30-S7NMP.

A variant of the GE U26C export locomotive was known as the U30C. This version is unrelated to the U30C built for North America.

== Original owners ==
Image	Owner	Quantity	Numbers	Notes
	Atchison, Topeka and Santa Fe Railway	6	400-405	model U30CG
	Atlantic Coast Line Railroad	4	3021-3024	#3021 was the first U30C built. To Seaboard Coast Line 2121-2124 in 1967, then to Seaboard System 7277-7280 in 1982, and to CSX 7277-7280 in 1986.
	Burlington Northern Railroad	180	5300-5394, 5800-5839, 5900-5944	5800-5805, 5900-5911 new as 5300-5305 (1st) and 5353-5364.
	Colorado & Southern (Chicago, Burlington & Quincy)	4	890-893	All sent to Burlington Northern. Same numbers.
	Chesapeake and Ohio Railway	13	3300-3312	
	Chicago and North Western Railway	7	930-936	934 was wrecked and rebuilt into a U34CH in 1978.
	Chicago, Milwaukee, St. Paul and Pacific Railroad (Milwaukee Road)	8	5651-5658	
	Chicago, Rock Island and Pacific Railroad (Rock Island)	18	4582-4599	XR Series
	Delaware and Hudson Railroad	12	701-712	
	Detroit Edison	11	007-012, 018-022	
	Ferrocarril del Pacifico	8	401-408	
	Kaiser Steel (Eagle Mountain Railroad Mine Division)	5	1030–1034	Ballasting Sand added to the frame to increase weight (considered the heaviest U30Cs ever built).
	Louisville and Nashville Railroad	79	1470–1499, 1534–1582	#1499 was presented in an XR Series paint scheme.
	Missouri Pacific Railroad	35	25-29, 960-983, 3329-3334	
	Norfolk and Western Railroad	3	8000-8002	
	Pennsylvania Railroad	5	6535-6539	All inherited by Penn Central, same numbers. Later inherited by Conrail with same numbers, later renumbered 6835-6839.
	Reading Company	5	6300-6304	All inherited by Conrail, renumbered 6579-6583, later 6840-6844.
	Soo Line Railroad	10	800-809	
	Southern Railway	5	3800-3804	High short hood
	Southern Pacific Railroad	37	7900-7936	Ballasting Sand added to the frame to increase weight.
	Union Pacific Railroad	150	2810–2959	#2851 was delivered with a fiberglass nose.
	United States Department of Transportation	1	1	

== Preservation ==
• Burlington Northern #5383 is preserved and operational at the Illinois Railway Museum

• Burlington Northern #5802 is preserved and on display in Gilette, Wyoming.

• DOTX #001 is preserved at the Pueblo Railroad Museum in Pueblo, Colorado.

• Reading #6300 is preserved at the Reading Railroad Heritage Museum in Hamburg, Pennsylvania.

• VLIX #1497 (ex-L&N 1497) is preserved at the Southern Appalachia Railroad Museum in Oak Ridge, Tennessee, awaiting restoration.

• VLIX #9009 (ex-DEEX #009) is preserved at the Southern Appalachia Railroad Museum in Oak Ridge, Tennessee, awaiting restoration.

== Images ==
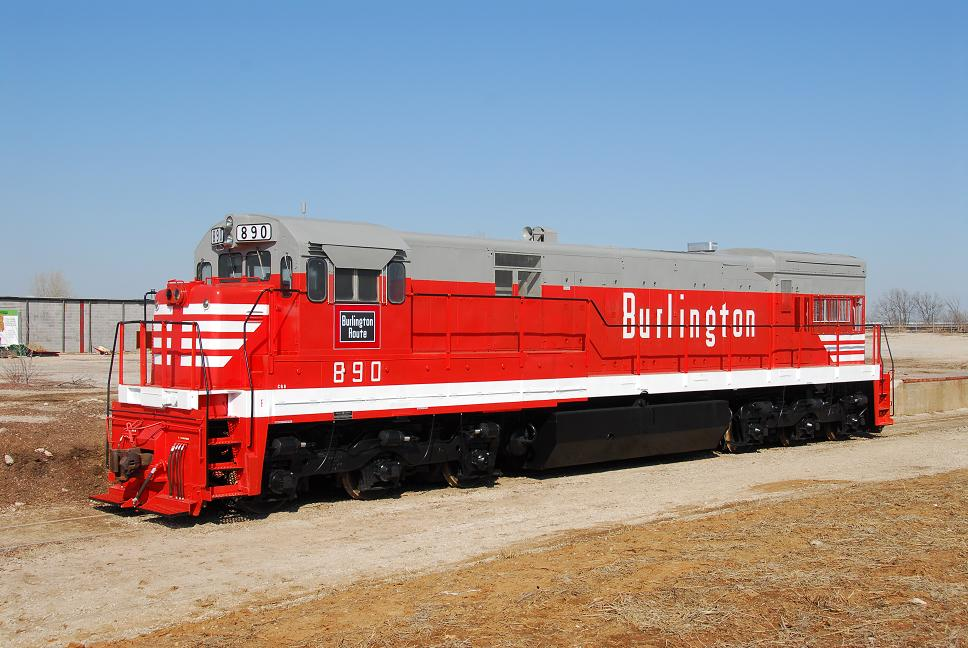
Colorado and Southern No. 890 GE U30C

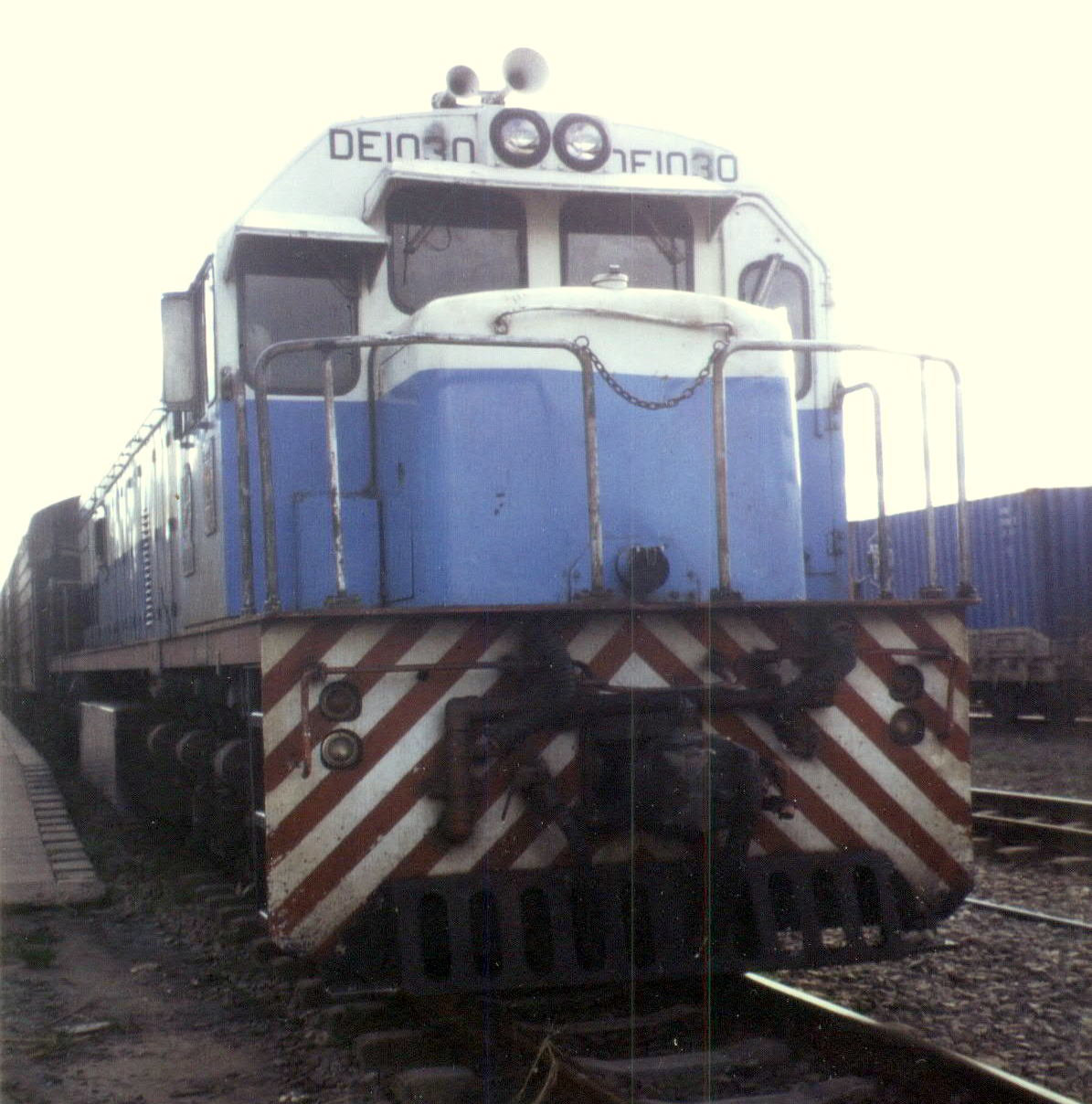
Tanazania Zamba Railway Authority GE U30C At Mlimba Station

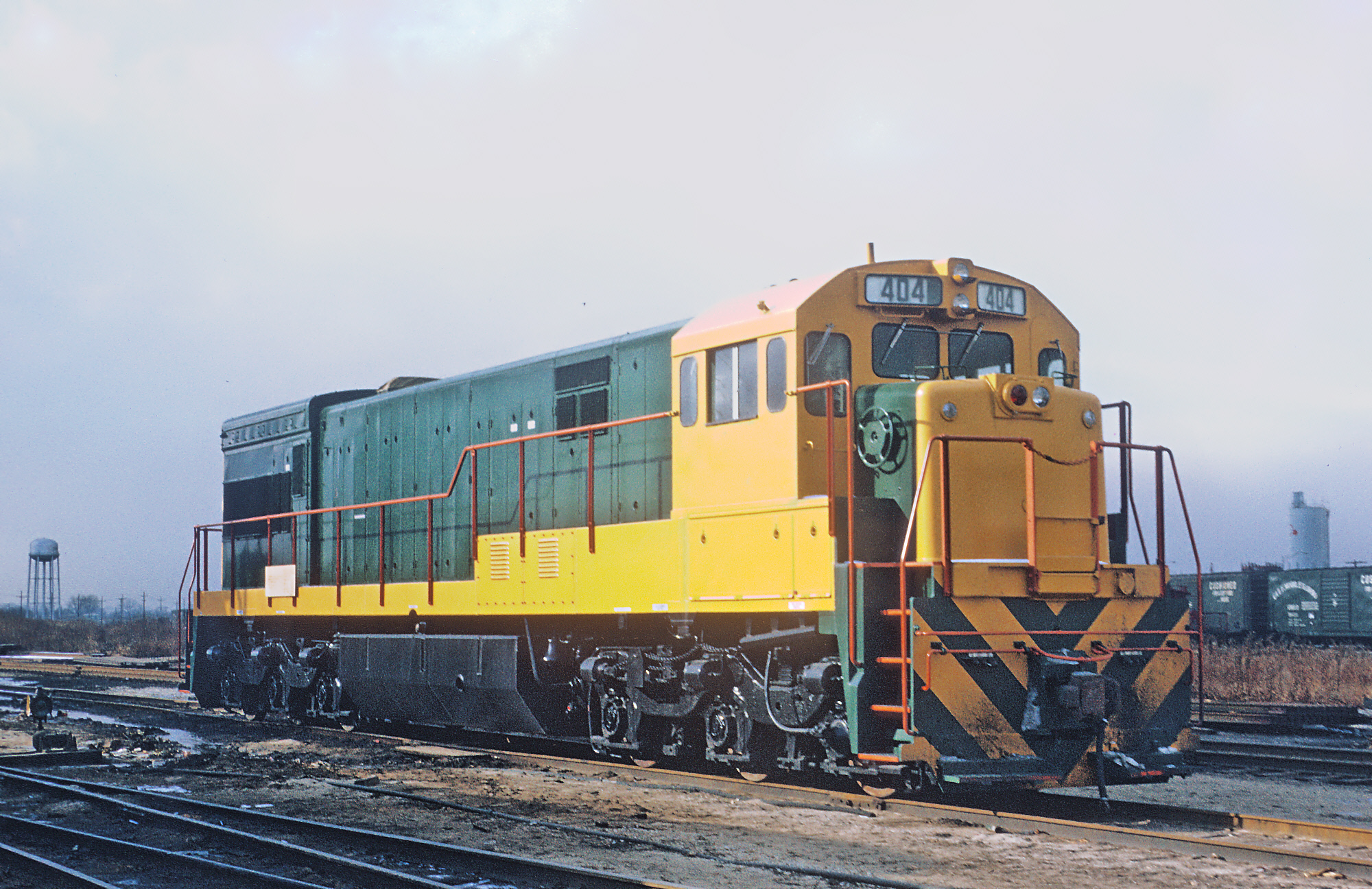
Ferrocarril del Pacífico U30C during delivery to Mexico, 1969

== See also ==
- Iranian locomotives
