= Association of American Railroads =

Industry trade group representing major North American freight railroads

- Abbreviation: AAR
- Formation: 1934
- Type: Trade Association
- Legal status: Active
- Purpose: Advocate, public voice, educator, research, testing, safety & efficiency of railroads
- Headquarters: 425 Third Street SW; Suite 1000
- Location: Washington, D.C.
- Region served: North America
- Members: Railroads and associates
- Official language: English
- President & Chief Executive Officer: Ian Jefferies
- Subsidiaries: Railinc Corporation; Transportation Technology Center, Inc.
- Staff: 70 (DC office)
- Website: www.aar.org

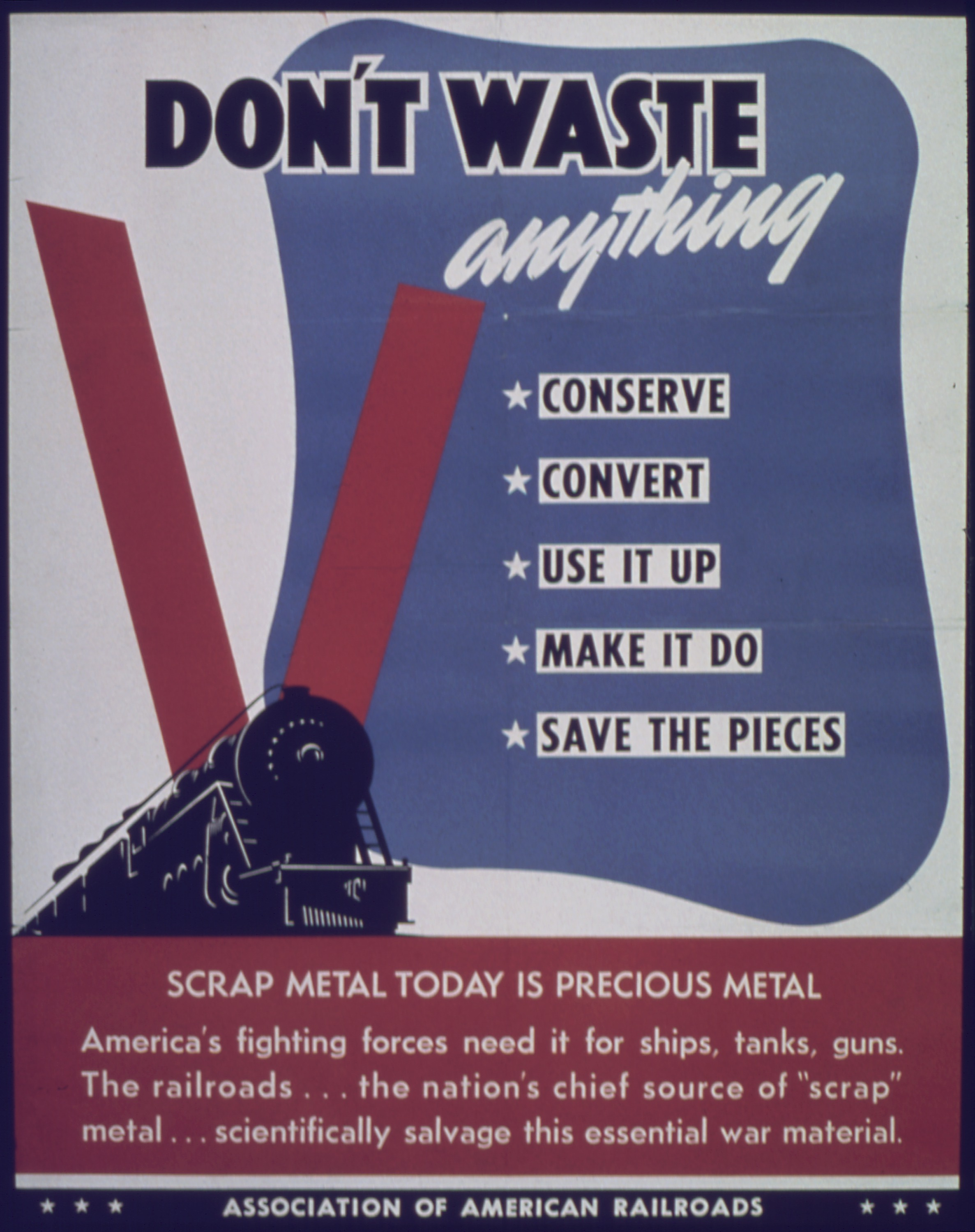
Association of American Railroads WWII poster

The Association of American Railroads (AAR) is an industry trade group representing primarily the major freight railroads of North America (Canada, Mexico and the United States). Amtrak and some regional commuter railroads are also members. Smaller freight railroads are typically represented by the American Short Line and Regional Railroad Association (ASLRRA), although some smaller railroads and railroad holding companies are also members of the AAR. The AAR also has two associate programs, and most associates are suppliers to the railroad industry.

== Creation ==
AAR was created October 12, 1934, by the merger of five industry-related groups:

- The American Railway Association
- The Association of Railway Executives
- The Bureau of Railroad Economics
- The Railway Accounting Officers Association
- The Railway Treasury Officers Association

William George Besler was its first President.

== Facilities and subsidiaries ==
The AAR is headquartered in Washington, D.C., near the U.S. Capitol.

Railinc, the Association of American Railroads’ IT subsidiary based in Cary, North Carolina, operates key systems such as Umler, the Interline Settlement System, and the Embargoes system, supporting North American rail operations. Handling about nine million daily EDI messages, it serves railroads, equipment owners, and suppliers, and maintains the industry’s official code tables. Originally an AAR department, it became a for-profit subsidiary in 1999.

Another subsidiary, the Transportation Technology Center, Inc. (TTCI), operates and maintains the Transportation Technology Center, a 52-square-mile (130 km^{2}) facility 21 miles (34 km) northeast of Pueblo, Colorado, owned by the United States Department of Transportation. The facility is under a care, custody and control contract with the Federal Railroad Administration. TTCI has an array of specialized testing facilities and tracks. The site enables testing of freight and passenger rolling stock, vehicle and track components, and safety devices.

== Functions ==
Where appropriate, the AAR represents its members' interests to the public at large and to Congress and government regulators in particular. The AAR works to improve the efficiency, safety and service of the railroad industry, such as through its responsibility for the industry's interchange rules and equipment specifications, e.g. for locomotive multiple unit control.

One of the AAR's duties is to oversee the assignment of reporting marks – two to four letter codes that uniquely identify the owner of any piece of railroad rolling stock or intermodal freight transport equipment (trailers, semi-trailers, containers, etc.) that can be carried on a railroad.

== Reports ==
In November 2013 the AAR urged the U.S. Pipeline and Hazardous Materials Safety Administration (PHMSA) to press for improved tank car safety by requiring all tank cars used to transport flammable liquids to be retrofitted or phased out, and new cars be built to more stringent standards."

== Members ==
=== AAR Full Members ===
- Alaska Railroad Corporation
- Railroads owned by Anacostia Rail Holdings Company
- BNSF Railway Company
- Canadian National Railway Company
- Canadian Pacific Kansas City
- CSX Transportation, Inc.
- Florida East Coast Railway
- Railroads owned by Genesee & Wyoming Inc.
- Indiana Rail Road Company
- Iowa Interstate Railroad, LLC
- Metra
- National Railroad Passenger Corporation (Amtrak)
- Norfolk Southern Corporation
- Railroads owned by R.J. Corman Railroad Group, LLC
- Union Pacific Railroad
- Vermont Rail System
- Railroads owned by Watco
- Wheeling & Lake Erie Railway

=== AAR Special Members (Canadian and Mexican Railroads) ===
- Canadian Pacific Kansas City (Mexican Operations)
- Ferrocarril del Istmo de Tehuantepec
- Ferrocarril y Terminal del Valle de México
- Grupo México Transportes

=== Former members ===
- Canadian Pacific Railway
- Ferrosur
- Kansas City Southern de México
- Kansas City Southern Railway
- Pan Am Railways

== See also ==
- AAR wheel arrangement
- African Union of Railways (AUR)
- American Railway Association
- International Union of Railways (UIC)
- Organisation for the Combined Operations of Railways (OSShD)
