= William George Besler =

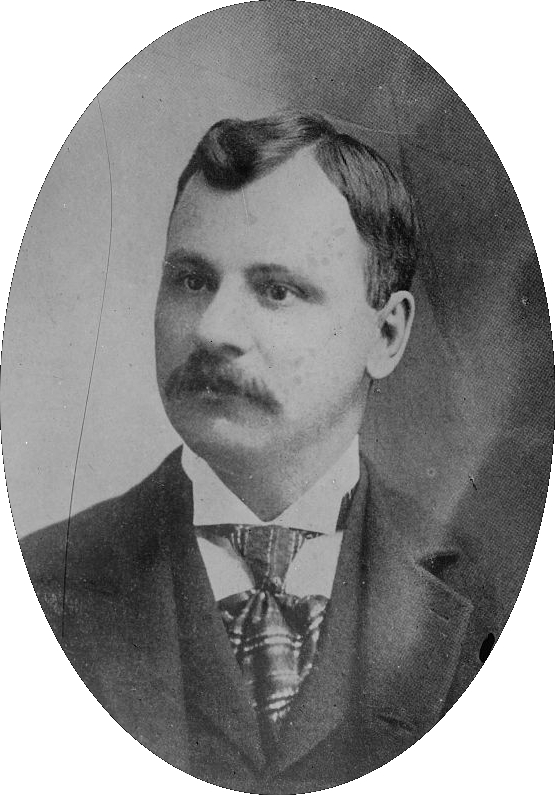

William George Besler (March 30, 1865 - May 20, 1942) was president of the Central Railroad of New Jersey.

== Biography ==
He was born in Galesburg, Illinois, to John Daniel Besler and Anna Chapin. He graduated from Massachusetts Institute of Technology in 1880 with a degree in Engineering.

He married Effie B Lewis on 10 October 1888. They had three children: Helen Anajane Besler (1892-1989), George Daniel Besler (1902-1995), and William John Besler (1904-1985). His sons, George and William, went on to make the world's first steam powered aeroplane at Oakland, California, on 12 April 1933.

Bessler started working for the Chicago, Burlington and Quincy Railroad as a trainmaster's clerk in Chicago. He rose through the ranks to become division superintendent of the company's St Louis Division in 1893. In 1900 he moved to Pittsburgh and Reading, becoming their general superintendent by 1903. The Central Railroad of New Jersey employed him in 1903 as general manager. By 1926 he had become chairman of the board.

Besler was an active member of the American Railway Association and became its president when it was renamed the Association of American Railroads. He was also a director of Gamewell Company, Rockwood Sprinkler Company, Holtzer-Cabot Electric Company, Eagle Signal Corporation, New York Transfer Company, National Railway Publication Company, Lehigh and Hudson River Railway Company, and Davenport Locomotive Works. Besler was also Director and Vice-President of the New Jersey Chamber of Commerce.

He died on May 20, 1942.
