= Doble steam car =

US make of steam-powered cars

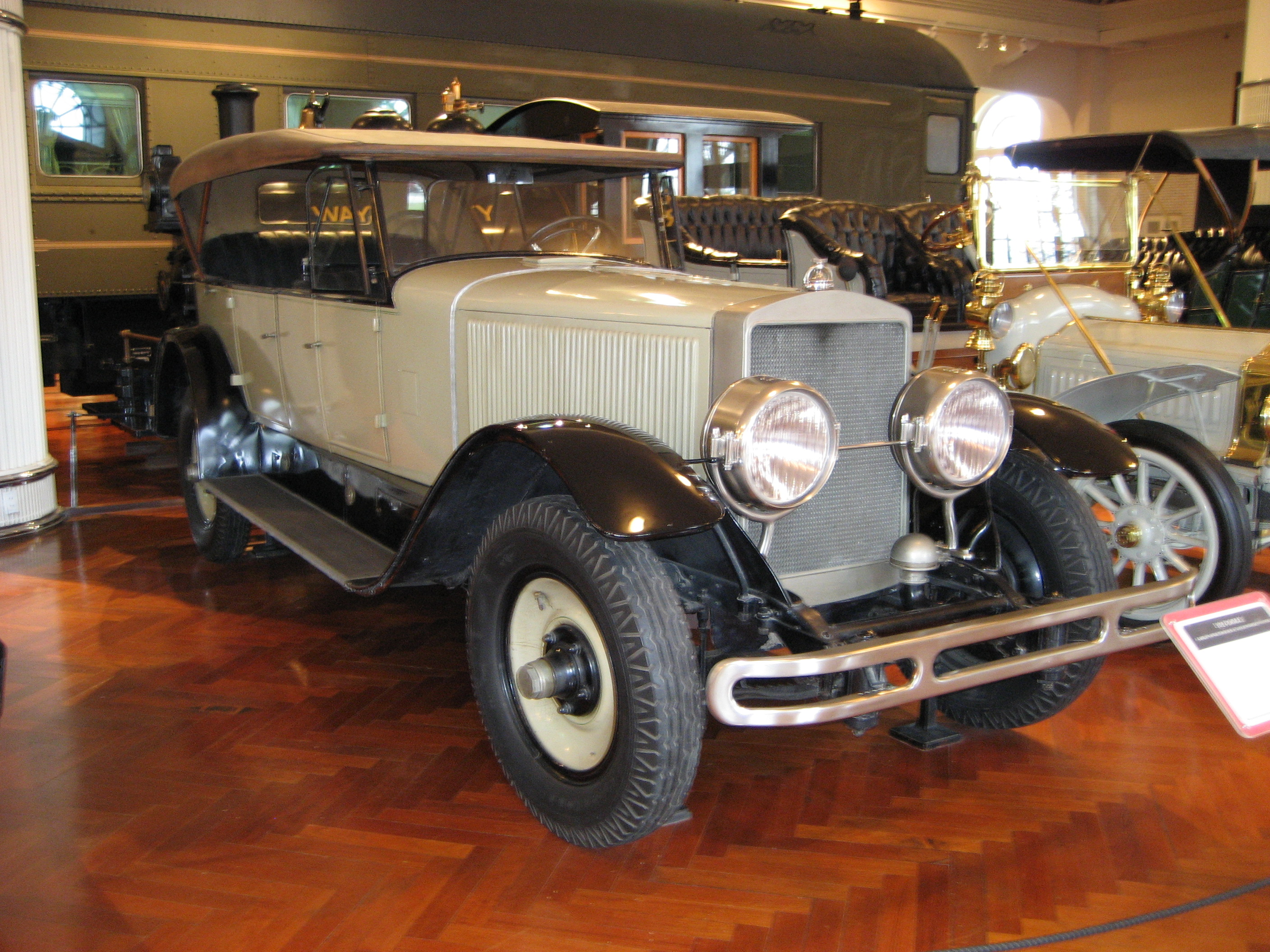
1924 Doble Model E at the Henry Ford Museum

The Doble steam car was an American steam car maker from 1909 to 1931. Its latter models of steam car, with fast-firing boiler and electric start, were considered the pinnacle of steam car development. The term "Doble steam car" comprises any of several makes of steam-powered automobile in the early 20th century, including Doble Detroit, Doble Steam Car, and Doble Automobile, severally called a Doble because of their founding by Abner Doble.

== History ==
=== Detroit ===
The Doble Detroit incorporated key ignition, doing away with the need for manual ignition of the boiler system. John Doble also constructed a flash boiler with rectangular casing in which atomized kerosene fuel was ignited with a spark plug, in a carburetor-type venturi and used forced draft provided by an electrically driven fan. This rapidly heated the feedwater contained in vertical grids of tubes welded to horizontal headers. The steam-raising part of the boiler was partitioned off by a wall of heat-resisting material jacketed with planished steel from a smaller compartment in which were similar grids of tubes for feedwater heating. There seem to have been at least two versions of this boiler, the first with the burner and combustion chamber at the bottom, the other with them at the top of the casing; this led to the subsequent counterflow monotube boiler arrangement. Boiler operation was fully electro-mechanically automated: the bottom of the boiler housed a metal tray with a row of quartz rods. As heat increased, the tray expanded, pushing the rods forward and shutting off the burner. As the system cooled, the quartz rods receded, engaging the burner.

A two-cylinder double-acting uniflow engine was mounted under the floor driving the back axle; double slide valves were driven by a Joy valve gear. The car had only four controls: a steering wheel, a brake pedal, a trip pedal for variable cut-off and reversing, and a foot-operated throttle. The layout of the chassis put the boiler at the front end of the car under the hood, the engine and the rear axle forming an integrated unit. The even weight distribution and low center of gravity contributed much to the ride and handling of all Doble cars.

The only defect sometimes noted throughout the Doble car era was less than perfect braking, which was common in automobiles of all types before 1930. Typically, a car of 1920s only had two rear-mounted mechanical drum brakes, although those fitted to Dobles were of larger than usual proportions. Dobles achieved reliability by eliminating most of the mechanical items that tended to malfunction in conventional automobiles: they had no clutch, no transmission, no distributor, and no points. Later Doble steam cars often achieved several hundred thousand miles of use before a major mechanical service was necessary

=== Steam powered tanks ===
During WW1 Doble's Detroit steam motors were used in two prototype tanks. One was the Holt Manufacturing Company steam-powered tank. This tank underwent trials in February 1918, but no further models were made. The other was a Steam Tank project by the Corps of Engineers. The Corps had created a successful flame-thrower in November 1917 and decided to mount it on a tank. Funding for the project was made by the Endicott and Johnson Shoe Company. The tank was similar in design to British heavy tanks of the period. It weighed 50-tons and was powered by two Doble steam engines.

=== Model D ===
The outcome was a complete redesign, the Model D of 1922. The uniflow engine, perceived as the root of the troubles with the Doble Detroit, gave place to a two-cylinder compound type, still with Joy's valve gear, but with piston valves. Another crucial development was a coiled monotube once-through vertically mounted cylindrical boiler following the thinking behind the later version of the Detroit boiler, the most distinctive feature of which was the placing of the burner at the top of the boiler. This plus a copious amount of insulation was meant to cause the hot gases to reside within the boiler casing for an optimum length of time giving up the maximum amount of heat to the feedwater. There was a forced-draft burner at the top of the boiler and an exhaust flue at the bottom. The venturi was placed horizontally at the top of the vertical boiler barrel and oriented in such a way as to avoid direct contact with the monotube while inducing a swirl motion to the gases. It was thus a counterflow design with water entering the lower end of the coiled monotube and progressing upward toward the burner, which meant that the hottest gases gave superheat to the steam at the top of the coil whilst the cooler gases preheated oncoming the feedwater at the bottom. The distinctive hand-operated "miniature steering wheel" rotating a throttle control rod that passed down the middle of the steering column can be observed in D2 which still exists (in the UK) at the present time. Photographic evidence shows that D1 retained the foot throttle pedal, so when the wheel throttle control was first applied is not clear. The latter probably gave more precise adjustment.

No more than five of the D model appear to have been built, if that. It is said that the two-cylinder compound engine sometimes gave difficulty in starting.

=== Model E ===
The Model E had been developed by 1922; this could be said to be the "classic" Doble, of which the most examples have survived. The initial monotube boiler design was perfected into the "American" type. This produced steam at a pressure of 750 psi (52 bar) and a temperature of 750 °F (400 °C). The tubing was formed from seamless cold-drawn steel 575 ft 9 in (175 m) in total length, measuring 22 in (560 mm) in diameter by 33 in (840 mm) in height when coiled and assembled. The boiler was cold water tested to a pressure of 7,000 psi (480 bar). Two 2-cylinder compound cylinder blocks were in effect placed back to back as the basis for a 4-cylinder Woolf compound unit with high-pressure cylinders placed on the outside. A piston valve incorporating transfer ports was fitted between each high-pressure and low-pressure cylinder in an arrangement similar to Vauclain's balanced compound system used on a number of railway locomotives around 1900. Stephenson's valve gear replaced the previous Joy motion. Like all steam vehicles it could burn a variety of liquid fuels with a minimum of modification and was a noticeably clean-running vehicle, its fuel being burned at high temperatures and low pressures, which produced very low pollution. Price ranged from $8,800 ($134,000 in 2020) to $11,200 ($170,000 in 2020) in 1923. The Model E ran on a 142 in (3,600 mm) wheelbase. Twenty-four E's were made between 1922 and 1925 with a variety of body types from roadsters to limousines. Owners included Howard Hughes and the Maharajah of Bharatpur. One of the Hughes cars, a roadster engine number 20, is currently owned by Jay Leno. Abner Doble owned the last one—number 24, which McCulloch later acquired in the course of developing the Paxton steam car.

The E cars known still to exist are 9 (at the Ford museum), 10 (in the UK), 11 (in Australia), 13 (in New Zealand), 14, 17, 18 (Jay Leno's Garage), 19, 20 (Jay Leno's Garage), 22 (in the UK), 23, and 24 (in New Zealand during a visit 1931). Those known to have been scrapped are 4, 5, 7, 15, and 16.

=== Model F ===
The main new feature was the boiler which formed the basis of later developments from 1930 onwards after the Doble company folded. Various other refinements were applied to individual cars such as a steam-driven water feed pump. Seven Model Fs were made, one of which was owned by Abner Doble's wife. They were car numbers 30 to 35, and 39. One of these, number 35, was a chassis only and sold to Oscar Henschel in Germany. Henschel's car was used by Hermann Göring and believed destroyed during the war. The car bodies were otherwise sedans or phaetons. The last F car number 39 was owned by Warren Doble. Engine number 32 was fitted into a Buick.

F30 and F34 still exist. The F30 is thought to be an E model engine and chassis. F34 in existence is said to be based on a Buick Series 60.

=== Engine numbers ===
Doble numbered all his engines sequentially:

- Numbers 1 to 24 were Model Es.
- Numbers 25, 28, 29, 36 to 38 were Model H engines for buses. The later three were used for a locomotive, power plant, and truck.
- Numbers 26, 27 were Model G engines for the Detroit Motorbus Company.
- Numbers 30–35, and 39 were Model Fs.
- Number 33 may have been used twice, once for the Model F and once for the A&G Price model H bus engine.

=== Typical performance ===
The 1924 model Doble Series E steam car could run for 1,500 miles (2,400 km) before its 24-gallon water tank needed to be refilled; even in freezing weather, it could be started from cold and move off within 30 seconds, and once fully warmed could be relied upon to reach speeds in excess of 90 miles per hour (140 km/h). In recent years Doble cars have been run at speeds approaching 120 mph (190 km/h), this without the benefits of streamlining, and a stripped-down version of the Series E accelerated from 0–75 mph (121 km/h) in 10 seconds. Its fuel consumption, burning a variety of fuels (often kerosene), was competitive with automobiles of the day, and its ability to run in eerie silence apart from wind noise gave it a distinct edge. At 70 mph (110 km/h), there was little noticeable vibration, with the engine turning at around 900 rpm.

Contemporary Doble advertisements mentioned the lightness of the engine, which would lead customers to compare it favorably with heavier gasoline engines, but "engine" in a steam car usually refers solely to the expander unit, and does not take into account the complete power plant including boiler and ancillary equipment; on the other hand, clutch and gearbox were not needed. Even so, the overall weight of a Series E was in excess of 5,000 pounds.

== Doble Steam Motors Company ==
The first model E was sold in 1924, and Doble Steam Motors continued to manufacture steam-powered cars for the next seven years.

For all their innovations, Doble cars were hindered by two significant problems. Doble cars were expensive to the point of being a luxury item, and Abner Doble routinely tinkered with designs.

Doble made two further steam engines, designated models G and H. These were larger units and used experimentally in several buses. The first were tested in 1926 by International Harvester, using a Doble Model G engine, and the Detroit Motorbus Co, in a double-decker, with a Doble Model H engine. A second Detroit bus had a Doble steam engine added in 1927, and at least one of them covered some 32,000 miles. In 1929 a Doble Model H was installed in a Yellow Coach for General Motors. This was followed by another Model F in a Fageol bus.

== Successors ==
=== Besler Brothers ===
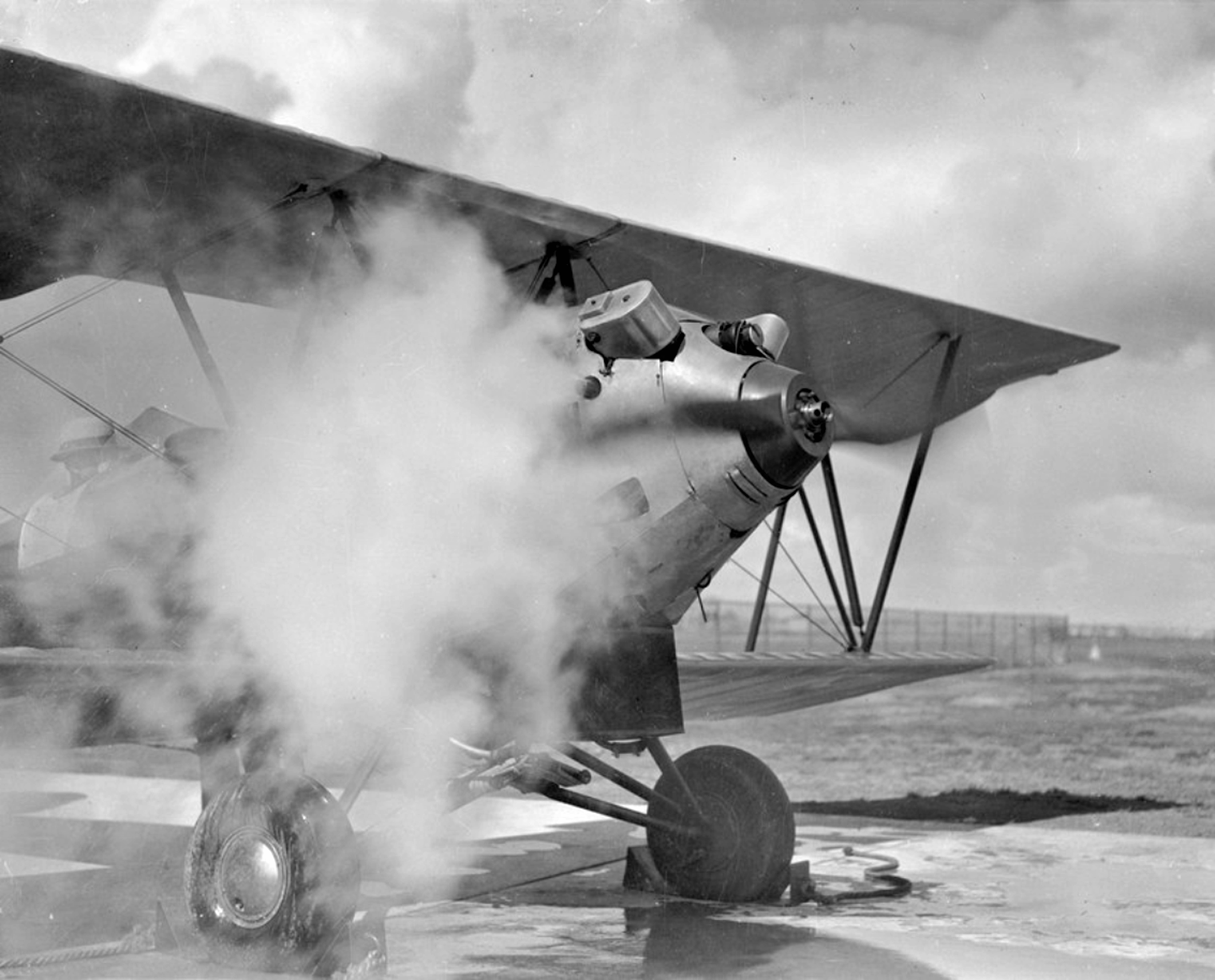
Steam-driven Travel Air 2000 in 1933

George and William Besler of Davenport, Iowa, the sons of William George Besler, acquired much of Doble Steam Motors plant and patents. William also acquired a Doble E series Phaeton, engine number 14, from a Dr Mudd. This car was still in existence in 2010.

They undertook further development work with Abner Doble and created an interurban car, a railcar, and a steam aircraft. The brothers modified a Travel Air 2000 bi-plane by replacing its petrol engine with a steam engine. The plane was successfully test flown on 12 April 1933 at Oakland Municipal Airport, California. In 1936, the New Haven Railroad tested the Besler streamliner, a two-car steam railcar.

In the mid-1950s Henry J. Kaiser asked William Besler to convert his 1953 Kaiser Manhattan to steam. Besler completed this in either 1957 or 1958. The engine was described as a V4 single acting uniflow with trunk pistons. It was a cross compound with piston valves across the high-pressure heads. Kaiser apparently did not take possession of the vehicle, leaving it with Besler.

In 1969, GM introduced two experimental steam-powered cars. One was the SE 124 based on a converted Chevrolet Chevelle, and the other was designated SE 101 based on the Pontiac Grand Prix. The SE 124 had its standard gasoline engine replaced with a 50 bhp (37 kW) Besler steam engine, using the 1920 Doble patents. The SE 101 had a GM-designed steam engine that had been developed in consultation with Besler.

=== Consultancy ===
Following the collapse of their company, Abner & Warren Doble traveled as steam power consultants. Abner first went to New Zealand in March 1930, where he worked for A&G Price on the development of steam buses, while from 1932 to 1933 Warren was in Germany managing a contract for Henschel & Son of Kassel, who went on to build a variety of steam applications including a speedboat, cars, railcars, buses, and trucks. The exact numbers of vehicles built are difficult to determine. Henschel did build 10 articulated steam trucks for Deutsche Bahn railways as delivery trucks. Abner was involved in the development of a steam bus for the Auckland Transport Board while in New Zealand.

From 1931 to 1935, Abner worked with Sentinel Waggon Works of Shrewsbury, England. Several shunting locomotives (switchers) and an undetermined number of railcars were fitted with Doble/Sentinel machinery for sale to customers in Britain, France, Peru, and Paraguay. In 1937, Abner, writing in Autocar, stated that any new steam cars would have to be superlatively good to compete with gasoline-powered cars of the day. He still considered it just possible with good management and a lot of money.

=== Ultimax Engine ===
Abner Doble's last consultancy was in the development of the Paxton Phoenix car, for the Paxton Engineering Division of McCulloch Motors Corporation, Los Angeles. The project was for a low-weight car built around a unique "torque box" chassis based on an aeronautical wing section. The Doble Ultimax steam unit was developed as one of two possible power plants, the other being an original design of two-stroke internal combustion engine. The Ultimax was designed to operate at a pressure of 2,000 psi (137.9 bar) and 1,200 °F (649 °C) and actually ran at about 1,560 psi (107.6 bar) and 900 °F (482 °C) with a nominal boiler pressure of 2,000 psi and flow rate of 900 lb/hr. The engine was a three-crank tandem (or steeple) compound engine with three pairs of vertical single-acting cylinders arranged in such a way as to give a double-acting effect. Its sustained maximum power was 120 bhp (89 kW); peak power was 155 bhp (116 kW) but could not be held due to insufficient steam flow. The expected average water rate was 9 lb/hp/hr. The project was eventually dropped in 1954.
