= Railinc Corporation =

- Industry: Software as a service Rail data as a service
- Founded: 1998; 28 years ago
- Headquarters: Cary, North Carolina, United States
- Area served: North America
- Key people: E. Allen West, President and CEO
- Products: Umler System, DDCT System, Embargoes System, RailSight Track & Trace, Interline Settlement System, EHMS, Car Hire
- Number of employees: 265 (2012)
- Parent: Association of American Railroads
- Website: http://www.railinc.com

Railinc Corporation (pronounced "rail-link") provides rail data and messaging services to the North American freight railway industry. Railinc is a for-profit subsidiary of the Association of American Railroads.

== Corporate structure ==
Railinc was established as an information technology department within the Association of American Railroads (AAR), and later spun off as a wholly owned, for-profit subsidiary of the AAR in 1998. The nine-member corporate board of directors consists entirely of members of the railroad industry, including all of the Class I railroads in North America and the AAR.

Railinc headquarters is located in Cary, North Carolina. Railinc's headquarters was relocated from joint operations in Chicago, Illinois and Washington, D.C., in 1999. Locations also considered were Denver, Colorado, Tampa, Florida, and Austin, Texas.

Railinc employs nearly 300 full-time and contractor employees, approximately ten percent of whom are certified project managers.

== Products and services ==
Railinc processes and delivers rail data as a service (DaaS) and provides software as a service (SaaS) to the freight rail industry. Because many of the company's IT systems are required by formal railroad operating rules, the company’s applications and services can be found embedded in critical operations and financial systems throughout the industry.

Key Railinc services include:

- Umler - The Umler system is the rail industry's official source for rail equipment information, including freight cars of all varieties, locomotives and end of train devices. This system replaced the legacy U.M.L.E.R. database, an acronym for Universal Machine Language Equipment Register. The name was changed in 2009 with the launch of the new Umler system in favor of the lower case spelling and trademarked name.
- RailSight - Railsight provides tracking and tracing data, known as car location messages (CLMs). The messages provide car locations to rail equipment owners, shippers, and third-party logistics providers. The data is used for fleet management and to track and trace the movement of freight and freight cars throughout North America to ensure goods are delivered on-time or to track the progress of their movement. The RailSight engine delivers more than 7.5 million rail events each day from more than 530 Class I, Class II and Class III railroads and shops across the United States, Canada and Mexico.
- Damaged and Defective Car Tracking - The Damaged and Defective Car Tracking (DDCT) system is used to identify and track damaged and defective rail cars to ensure their proper handling on the railways. This system, launched in 2011, replaced paper defect cards. Paper defect cards were used to aid in maintaining a record of the identified defects on each car, where the defects originated, and to determine the responsibility for each defect.

== Corporate memberships ==
The company is part of the Surface Transportation Board information sharing and analysis center (ST-ISAC).
