= ENSCO =

American engineering company

ENSCO, Inc.
- Type: Privately held company
- Industry: Engineering; Research and Development; Defense; Transportation; Space; Intelligence
- Founded: March 31, 1969; 57 years ago
- Founder: Paul W. Broome
- Headquarters: Merrifield, Virginia (Vienna, Virginia address); United States
- Key people: Jeffrey M. Stevens, President; Thomas DeFrank, CFO
- Services: Engineering services; Avionics and aerospace technology; Transportation technology; Meteorological analysis technology
- Number of employees: 700+
- Website: ensco.com

ENSCO, Inc. is an American company that provides engineering, science, and technology products and services to government and private sector customers in the aerospace, national security, and surface transportation sectors. The company was founded with a focus on research and development, and is most known for its signal processing work for the U.S. Department of Defense and for its railroad inspection equipment and processing that senses good and bad railroad tracks for the U.S. Department of Transportation. ENSCO is also known for work in the meteorological realm. The company's headquarters have been situated at several locations within the general Fairfax County, Virginia area.

== Founding and corporate history ==
2600 Park Tower Drive, Vienna VA

With a focus on research and development, ENSCO, Inc. was established in 1969 by Paul W. Broome (1932–2018). A graduate of Carnegie Tech/Carnegie Mellon University, with bachelors, masters, and doctoral degrees in electrical engineering all from there, Broome had previously worked at General Dynamics, Pan American World Airways, and Teledyne before starting his own company.

ENSCO, Inc.-labeled mail from 1975

The company was based in the vicinity of Springfield, Virginia during the 1970s and 1980s. Specifically, the corporate headquarters were physically located in the Ravensworth census-designated place in unincorporated Fairfax County, Virginia, with a Springfield postal address.

In 1982, Francesco A. Calabrese became president and chief operating officer of the company, while Broome remained as chief executive officer. The search for the president's position was unusually public. In any case, the following year Calabrese was replaced by Norm Bush.

By the early 1980s, the firm had revenues of $18 million.

In 1997, Broome was said to have retired as chief executive officer of the company, although a decade later some news stories would still refer to him as being in that role.

By 2005, the company's headquarters were in the vicinity of Falls Church, Virginia. Specifically, the headquarters were physically located in Annandale CDP in unincorporated Fairfax County, with a Falls Church postal address.

Ensco had annual revenues of about $100 million in the mid-2000s.

In 2011, the company acquired the IData and IGL 178 product lines from the computer graphics company Quantum3D.

In 2024, the company moved its headquarters again, this time to the vicinity of Vienna, Virginia. Specifically, ENSCO's corporate headquarters are physically located in Merrifield, Virginia, with a Vienna, Virginia postal address.

== Department of Defense and related work ==
Based upon a suggestion given during an infrasound course at ENSCO, an Air Force technician at Patrick Air Force Base in Florida works on a small geodesic dome designed to collect hydroacoustic data, part of operating and maintaining a global network of sensors to detect nuclear explosions

From its early years, Ensco has done work on signal processing for the Department of Defense. Employees engaged in such work have often needed a United States security clearance. So central has the work been that the Washington Post once identified Ensco simply as "a Springfield high-technology signal processing firm."

Well into the 21st century, Ensco has continued to work on signal processing technologies. In 2019, for instance, Ensco partnered with DeepSig to use artificial intelligence to enhance signal processing in support of national security objectives.

In addition to signal processing, Ensco has also engaged in systems integration and other engineering services for the Defense Department.

In 2005, the company opened an office in Watervliet, New York, for work related to the Watervliet Arsenal.

For much of the 2010s and 202s, Ensco developed high-precision radio frequency wireless technologies, which were useful for navigational applications.

In 2017, the company was awarded a $74 million contract by the U.S. Air Force to provide modeling software and engineering support, with the work to be done at ENSCO's facility in Melbourne, Florida.

ENSCO was given a share of the Space Systems Command's $57 million program for the Department of Defense and the National Reconnaissance Office, announced in 2023, towards modernizing the Satellite Control Network and otherwise improving the telemetry, tracking, and command, control, and communications aspects of the network, with Modern Technology Solutions as the prime contractor.

== Department of Transportation work ==
=== Early contracts and rail research cars ===
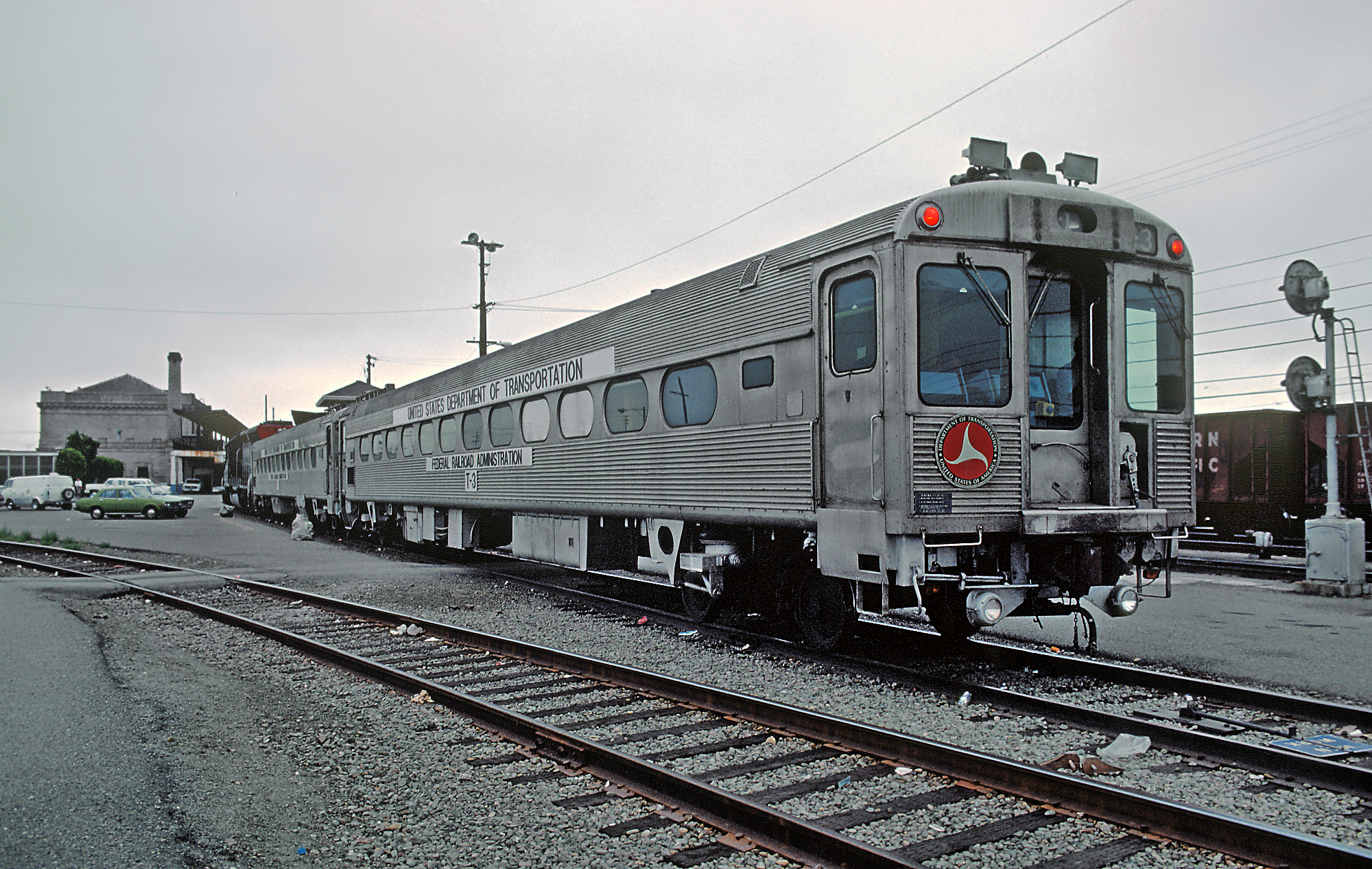
The T-3 railroad research car, operated by ENSCO on behalf of the U.S. Department of Transportation

One of ENSCO's first contracts came in 1970 and was with the Federal Railroad Administration, part of the U.S. Department of Transportation, for improved testing methods using the department's rail research cars. Valued at $570,000, the contract involved several different aspects, including enhanced instrumentation, data collection, and computer programming to process and analyze the data.

ENSCO's contracts with the Federal Railroad Administration continued in subsequent years. Beginning in the early 1970s it was active at the FRA's Transportation Technology Center in Pueblo, Colorado, working in several areas, including using measured train data to validate computer models for rail car behavior. During the 1970s, Ensco operated the T-1 and T-3 railroad research cars on behalf of the Department of Transportation, and measuring and capturing track information at high speeds. In general, the company was placed in charge of ensuring that track safety monitoring equipment was functioning correctly.

"U.S. Transit Track Restraining Rail: Volume II: Guidelines", 1981 report from ENSCO, Inc. for the Urban Mass Transportation Administration

By the mid-1980s, Ensco was operating the T-10 automated track inspection vehicle, which was a self-propelled track geometry car, for the Federal Railroad Administration. The company also used cars with instrumented undercarriages that were pulled behind regular passenger trains. The company's survey directors were electronics engineers who rode the rails for up to a thousand miles a week.

=== Subsequent work ===
By mid-2000s, Ensco was working in conjunction with Plasser American on the T-18, a self-propelled car with a gauge restraint measurement system. and by the end of the decade, ENSCO was working on using machine vision technologies to assist in monitoring track conditions, coming up with a system that used a high-resolution line-scan camera with a laser sensor. Products that Ensco marketed included the Laser Gauge and Rail Profile Measurement System and the Joint Bar Inspection System.

In April 2017, the company was awarded a contract by the Federal Railroad Administration for the Automated Track Inspection Program.

=== Management of the Transportation Technology Center ===
Logo of the U.S. Department of Transportation, Federal Railroad Administration, Transportation Technology Center, operated by ENSCO, Inc.

In March 2021, the FRA awarded a US$571 million "care, custody, and control" contract to ENSCO to assume responsibility for operations and maintenance of the Transportation Technology Center in Pueblo. The transition from the former contractor, Transportation Technology Center, Inc., was completed as scheduled in October 2022, The contract has a five-year base period and three five-year renewal options.

In addition, ENSCO was charged with expanding the use of the center to support more general ground transportation research. Accordingly, ENSCO announced the formation of the Center for Surface Transportation Testing and Academic Research (C-STTAR) consortium, including eight universities and academic research centers, to assist with research "across all modes of surface transportation" at the Transportation Technology Center. Other members of the C-STTAR consortium include:

- Center for Urban Transportation Research (at University of South Florida, consortium lead)
- Colorado State University Pueblo
- University of Hawaiʻi
- Michigan State University
- Michigan Tech
- Mineta Transportation Institute (at San Jose State University)
- University of Nebraska–Lincoln
- Oregon State University

== Meteorological work ==
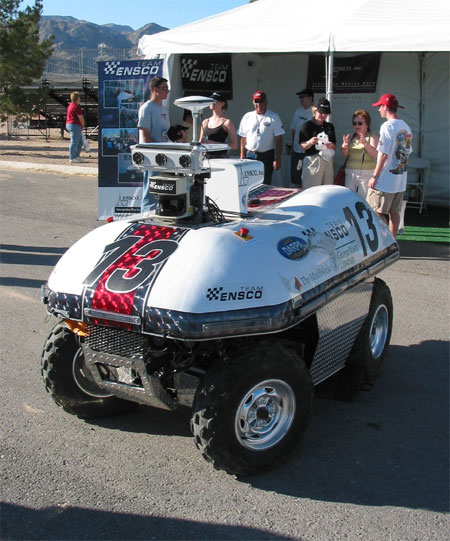
Team ENSCO vehicle from the DARPA Grand Challenge in 2004

Beginning in 1991, Ensco had a contract for operating the Applied Meteorology Unit, a tri-agency cooperative effort between NASA, the United States Air Force, and the National Weather Service. The emphasis was on weather tracking and monitoring along the Space Coast in Florida, with Ensco establishing a meteorological operation in Cocoa Beach. In particular, the unit had a focus on assisting Space Shuttle operations, and other aspects of the space program, by adapting new research into techniques for improving actual weather forecasting and analysis. In 1995, the Kennedy Space Center gave its Small Business of the Year award to Ensco for the quality of its work.

The contract was re-competed and re-awarded to Ensco at five-year intervals thereafter.

During 2005, Ensco expanded its meteorological operations by taking over weather tracking and forecast dissemination for United Airlines in Chicago, with the change being announced in early 2006.

Around the same time, Ensco began doing additional work for the National Weather Service, by being part of a multi-vendor team, led by Raytheon Information Solutions, operating that agency's Advanced Weather Interactive Processing System.

== Past presidents ==
As of 2024, ENSCO's headquarters are in 2600 Park Tower Drive adjacent to the Dunn Loring–Merrifield station of the Washington Metro

ENSCO Presidents
Name	Year Began	Year End
Paul Broome	1969	1982
Frank Calabrese	1982	1983
Norm Bush	1983	1994
Greg Young	1994	2006
Boris Nejikovsky	2014	2022
Jeff Stevens	2022	Present
