= Steam Wheel Tank =

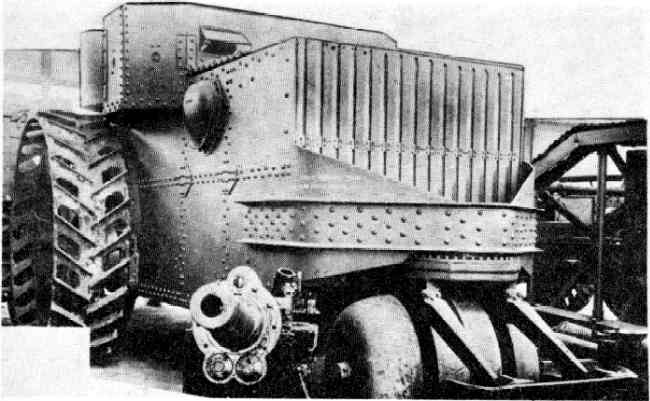
- The Steam Wheel Tank
- Place of origin: United States

Specifications
- Mass: 17 tons
- Length: 22 ft 3 in (6.78 m)
- Width: 10 ft 1 in (3.07 m)
- Height: 9 ft 10 in (3.00 m)
- Crew: 6
- Armor: 0.23–0.63 in (5.8–16.0 mm)
- Main armament: 2× 6-pounder (57 mm) cannons
- Secondary armament: 2× machine guns
- Engine: 2 steam

The Steam Wheel Tank was a U.S.-produced, prototype armoured fighting vehicle built by the Holt Manufacturing Company (now Caterpillar Inc.). Developed sometime between late 1916 and early 1917, it was the third tank to be designed in the U.S. The prototype was completed in February 1918 and was evaluated between March and May 1918 at Aberdeen Proving Ground. It performed poorly and was not developed further.

== Design ==
Although it is often assumed that the vehicle was a tadpole configuration (with two driving wheels at the front), a senior Holt executive and the Aberdeen Proving Ground's report state that it was a delta configuration (with the large wheels at the rear), and that the vehicle drove like a conventional agricultural tractor.

The two driving wheels were 8 feet (2.4 m) in diameter with 3-foot-wide (0.91 m) treads, and a 4 feet (1.2 m) diameter roller, used for steering, was sited at the front. The rear wheels were made from pressed-steel sheet, the same as those used on Holt agricultural machinery of the period. A small plate was attached to the roller to assist in crossing trenches. Each rear wheel was driven by a Doble two-cylinder 75 hp (56 kilowatts) steam engine and a Doble kerosene-fired boiler.

The vehicle's armament comprised 2 6-pounder (57 mm) cannons, mounted in sponsons, and two machine guns. Its riveted armour plating was between six and fifteen millimetres thick.

== See also ==
- Steam powered tracked tank
