= MxV Rail =

Railroad testing and training facility

Coordinates: 38°26′04″N 104°17′06″W

- Industry: Railroad equipment testing and training
- Predecessor: Transportation Technology Center, Inc.
- Founded: 1998; 27 years ago
- Headquarters: Pueblo, Colorado, United States
- Area served: North America
- Key people: Kari Gonzales, CEO and President
- Number of employees: 300
- Parent: Association of American Railroads
- Website: mxvrail.com

MxV Rail (full legal name: Transportation Technology Center, Inc.) is a subsidiary of the Association of American Railroads (AAR) which conducts railroad equipment testing and training for member railroads.

From 1982 until October 2022, AAR managed operations at the Transportation Technology Center (TTC) as part of public-private partnership between AAR and the TTC's owner, the Federal Railroad Administration (FRA). The TTC is a railroad equipment testing facility located northeast of Pueblo, Colorado. AAR formed its Transportation Technology Center, Inc. (TTCI) subsidiary in 1998, and TTCI assumed the contract.

In March 2021, TTCI lost the contract to operate the TTC, effective October 2022. In March 2022, AAR rebranded TTCI as MxV Rail, as it works to establish its own testing facility in Pueblo.

== History ==
The facility operations and maintenance for TTC has been the responsibility of a contractor since July 1972. Due to reduced funding that threatened to close TTC, the FRA entered a public-private partnership with AAR in 1982, who would take over "care, custody, and control" of the facility. AAR formed its TTCI subsidiary to administer the contract in 1998 and the contract was renewed periodically as a single-source award.

In March 2021, the FRA awarded the operations and maintenance contract to ENSCO, who assumed responsibility for research and development, testing, engineering, and training services at TTC from TTCI starting in October 2022. In addition, ENSCO plans to expand the use of TTC to support more general ground transportation research.

In April, TTCI announced plans to build a new, independent research facility in Pueblo after reaching an agreement with the Pueblo Economic Development Corporation (PEDCO). The new facility would be in the PuebloPlex industrial park (site of the former Pueblo Chemical Depot), just south of the TTC.

In March 2022, the AAR announced that TTCI would be rebranded into MxV Rail, a name based on the mathematical formula for momentum: mass x velocity.

== Facilities ==
At the PuebloPlex, MxV Rail plans to build a high-tonnage loop for accelerated service testing and curve negotiation loops, along with related infrastructure to support certification testing by the AAR.
