= Davenport Locomotive Works =

American locomotive manufacturer

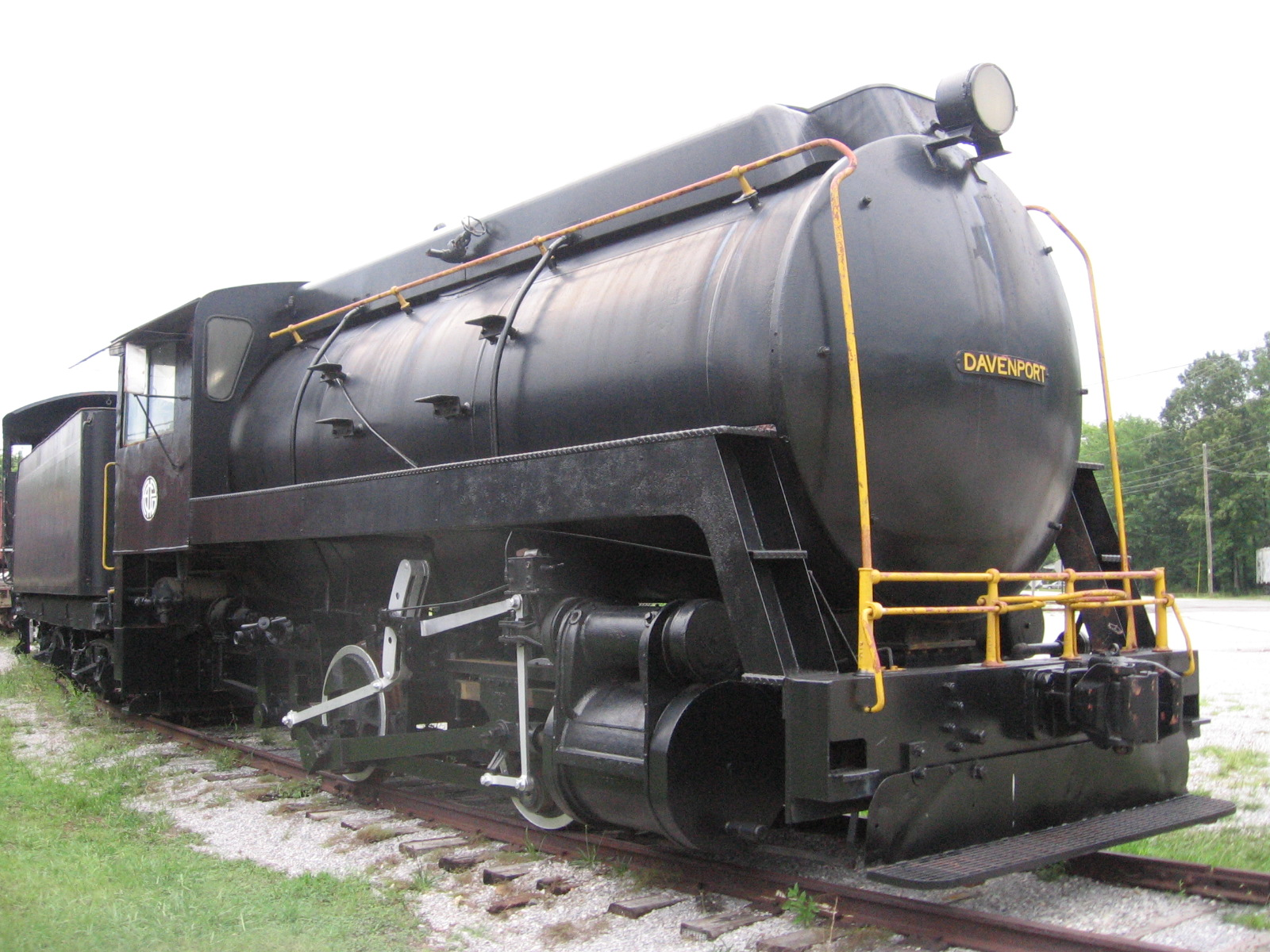
Alabama Power Company fireless locomotive No.40 built by Davenport in 1953 at the Heart of Dixie Railroad Museum.

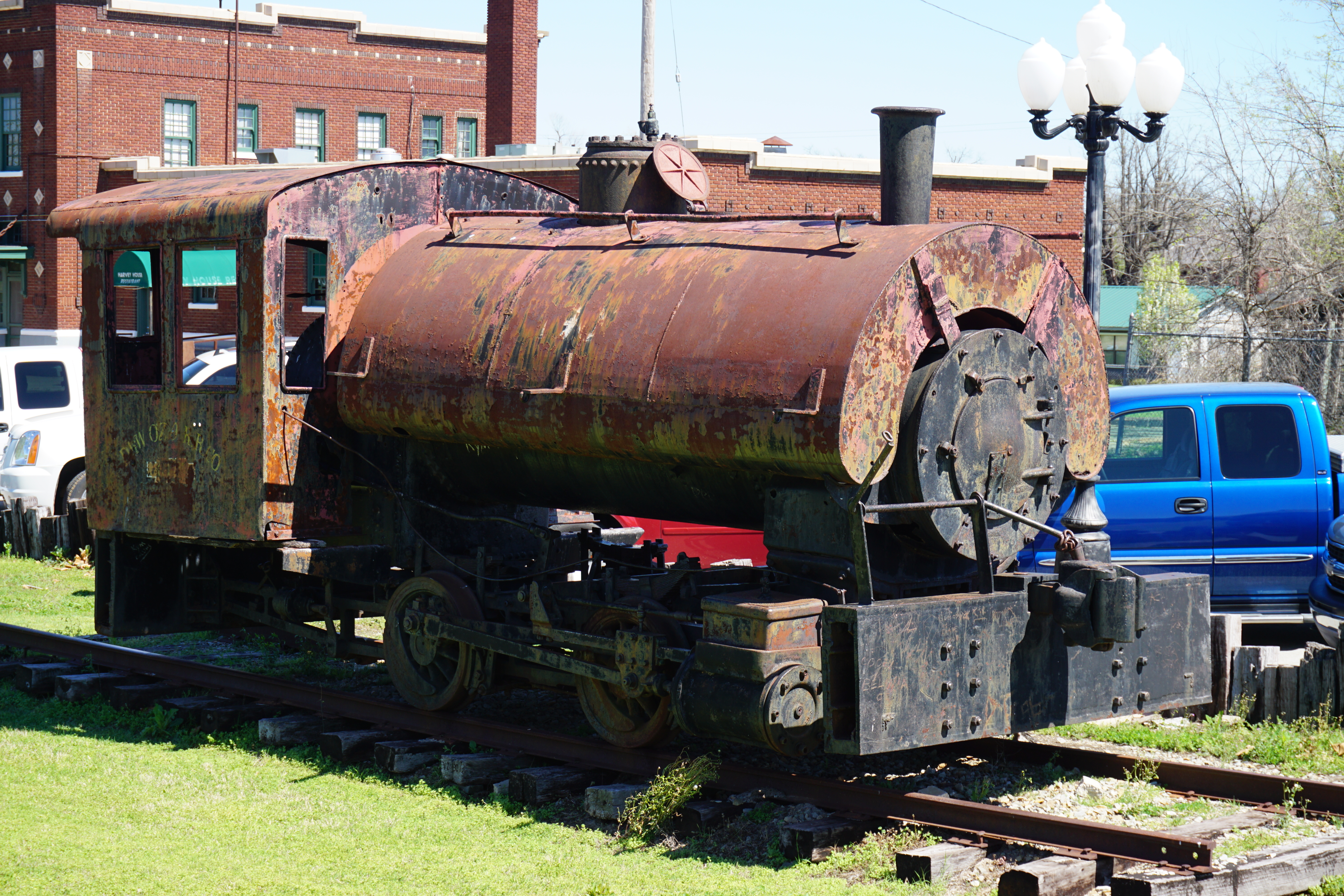
Davenport-built DkW OZA 0-4-0ST No. 1907 on display outside the Frisco Depot Museum in Hugo, Oklahoma

The Davenport Locomotive Works, of Davenport, Iowa, USA, was formed as the W W Whitehead Company in 1901. In 1902, the company commenced building light locomotives. The Company was renamed the Davenport Locomotive Works in 1904.

In late 1930, Davenport was licensed to assemble and market R G LeTourneau Inc products under the Davenport-LeTourneau brand. The agreement is believed to have ended in 1935 when LeTourneau moved to Peoria, Illinois. Davenport also sold Davenport-Winchell three-wheel roller conversions of industrial wheel tractors, Davenport-Frink snow plows, which were built in license from Frink Sno-Plows Inc, and Reynolds patented Mov-Mor rotary scrapers.

In 1933, the company was again restructured and renamed the Davenport-Besler Corporation, which continued in business until 1956. William George Besler was a director at the time of the restructuring. The company acquired the locomotive business of H. K. Porter, Inc. in 1950 and from then on produced Porter designs as well as its own. The Canadian Locomotive Company acquired Davenport-Besler in 1955, closing it the following year.

The company had built small steam locomotives early on; its first gasoline-fueled internal combustion engined locomotive was built in 1924 and its first diesel locomotive in 1927, a 30-short-ton (26.8-long-ton; 27.2 t) diesel-electric for the Northern Illinois Coal Company of Boonville, Indiana.

An extensive range of diesel locomotives in all industrial sizes followed, utilizing either mechanical torque converter or electric transmission, the former for the smaller locomotives. Most were used by a variety of industrial customers, but some railroads also bought Davenport locomotives, particularly the 44-short-ton (39.3-long-ton; 39.9 t) size: being the largest locomotive then allowed by union rules to be operated by one person. Railroad buyers included the Rock Island, Milwaukee Road, Santa Fe, Frisco, and Missouri Pacific. In 1963, that rule was relaxed and railroads ceased buying industrial-sized locomotives for light switching.

Davenport built a number of locomotives for the United States Army including World War I trench railways, the USATC S100 Class 0-6-0 of World War II, and eighteen larger switcher locomotives during the 1950s, two of which were adjustable in gauge: One could operate on broad gauges up to 5 ft 6 in (1,676 mm), and one on narrow gauges—the latter (3 ft or 914 mm) operating for a period on the Denver & Rio Grande Western Railroad.

Three Davenport 500 HP locomotives (built in 1952) of the State Railway of Thailand are still in service as of March 2023.

Various Davenport locomotives are preserved in the US as well as in other parts of the world.

== Preservation ==
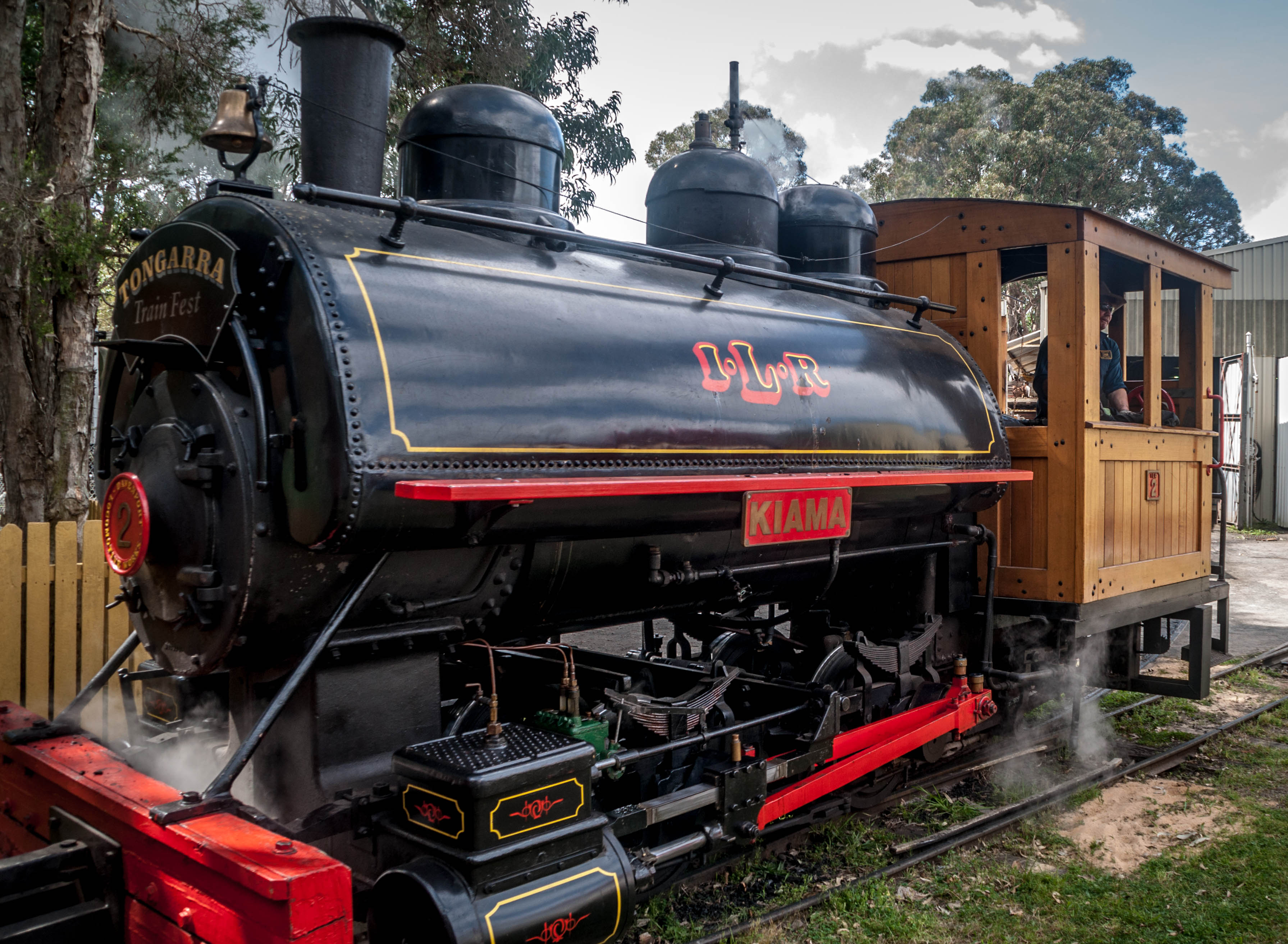
Davenport #1597 preserved by Illawarra Light Railway Museum

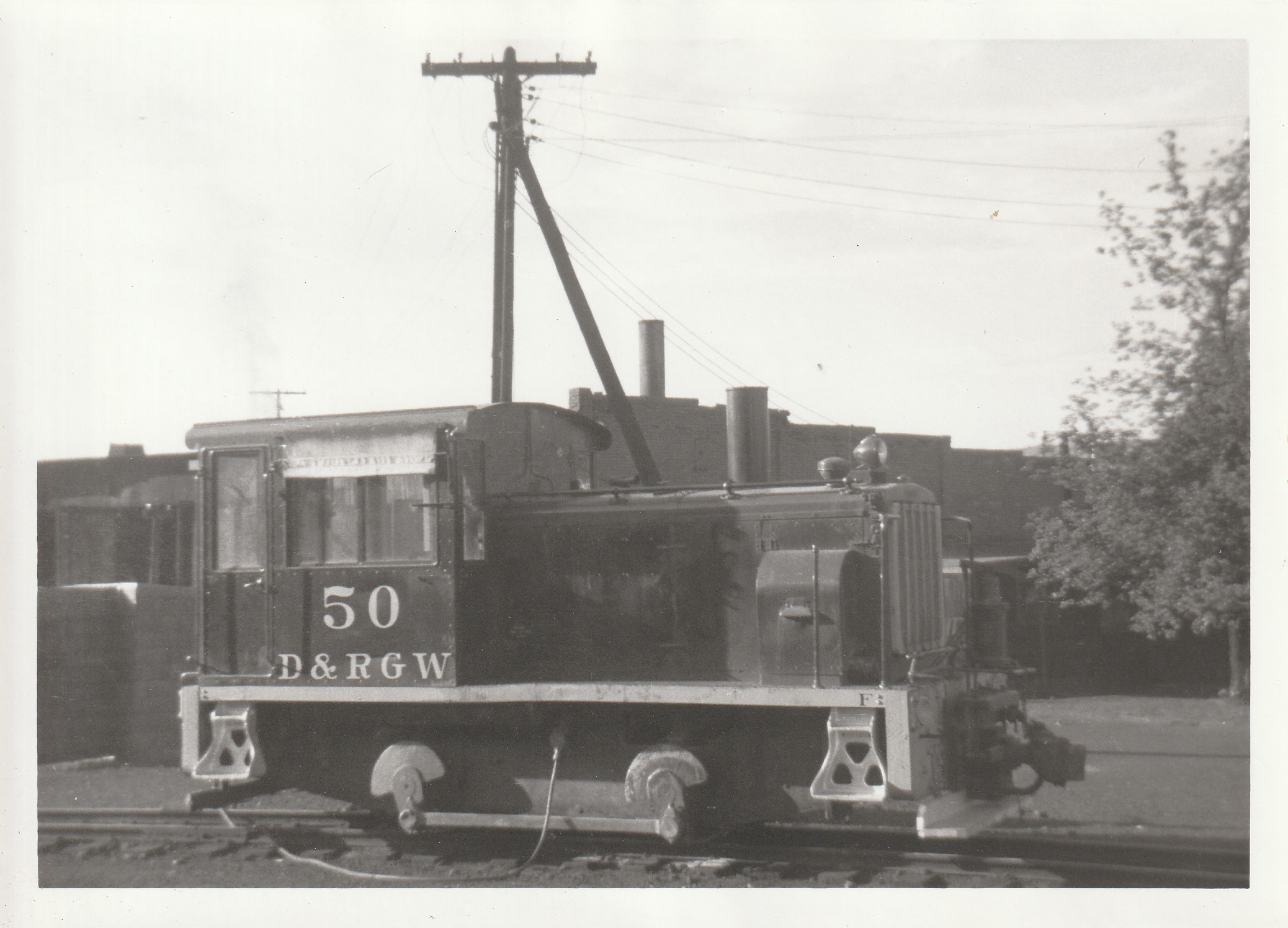
Davenport #2245 narrow gauge diesel switcher at Durango, Colorado in August 1964

- Davenport #1597 Kiama an 0-4-0ST Locomotive of 1917 at the Illawarra Light Railway Museum
- Davenport-Besler #2245 - a 30 ton 3 ft (914 mm) gauge 0-4-0 Diesel switcher of 1937, D&RGW number 50, at the Colorado Railroad Museum
- Davenport #2240 30 ton 4 ft 8 1/2 in (1,435 mm) standard gauge 0-6-0 Switcher, 1936, used on the US Construction Railroad during the construction of the Hoover Dam and kept at the Nevada State Railroad Museum, Boulder City, Nevada
- Davenport Locomotive Narrow Gauge (painted Wayne County Roads No 7) is on display at the John D. Dingell Transit Center in Dearborn, Michigan.
- Davenport #5240 - a 2-6-2T First world war trench engine in 2 ft (610 mm) gauge. Restored to working order in Arroyo Grande, CA
