= Transportation Technology Center =

Railroad equipment testing facility near Pueblo, Colorado, US

Coordinates: 38°26′04″N 104°17′06″W

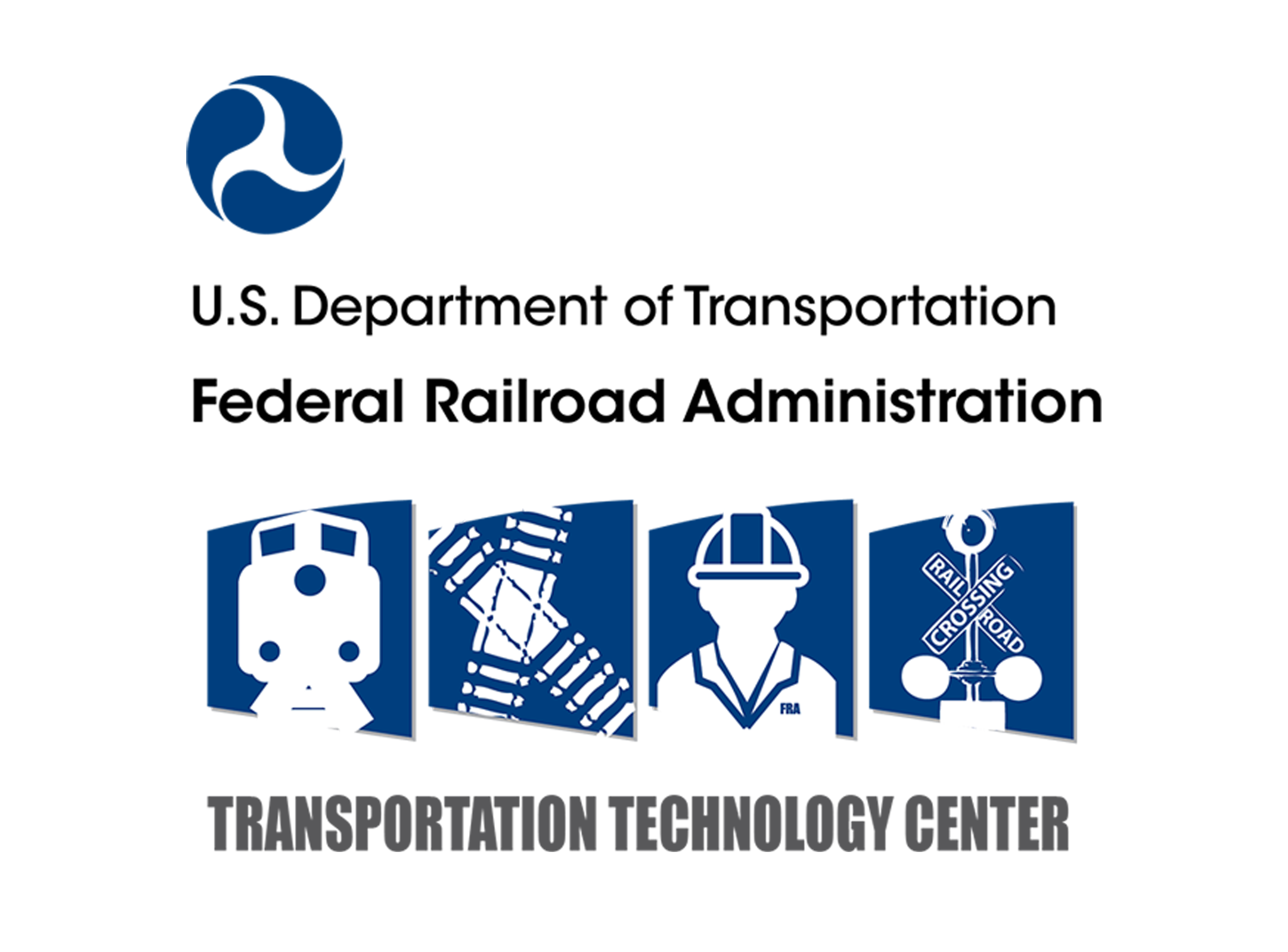

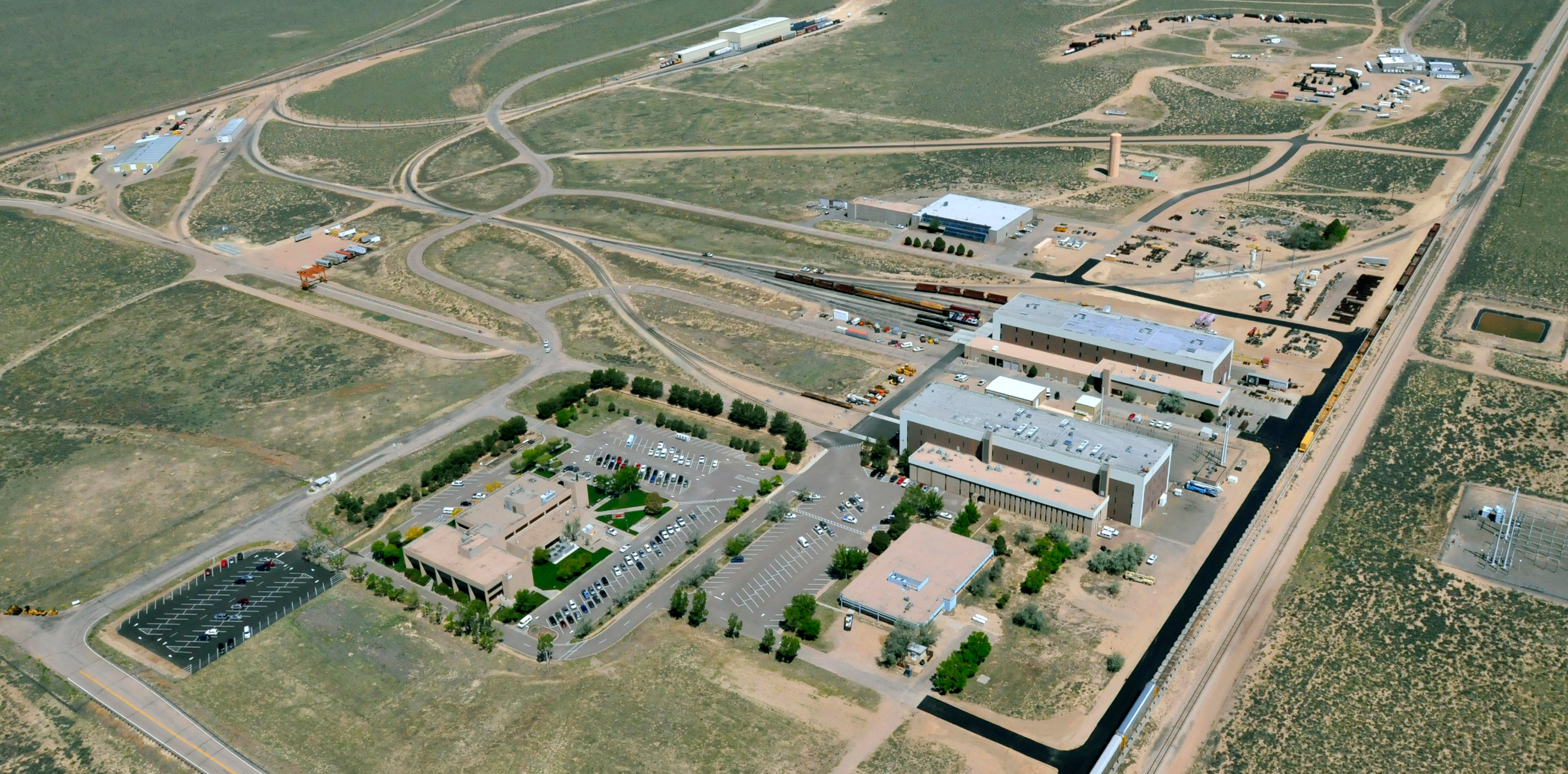
- Aerial view of Transportation Technology Center, facing approximately north-northwest. The prominent buildings on the right side of the photograph are the RDL (foreground) and CSB (background).
- Industry: Railroad equipment testing and training
- Predecessor: High Speed Ground Test Center
- Founded: May 19, 1971; 55 years ago
- Headquarters: Pueblo, Colorado, United States
- Area served: North America
- Owner: Federal Railroad Administration
- Website: railroads.dot.gov/program-areas/testing-facilities-equipment/testing-facilities-equipment

The Transportation Technology Center (TTC) is a railroad equipment testing and training facility located northeast of Pueblo, Colorado, owned by the Federal Railroad Administration (FRA). It was built in 1971 as the High Speed Ground Test Center (HSGTC) for the Department of Transportation (DOT) and its original purpose was to test several hovertrain concepts. When those projects were completed in the 1970s, the site was handed to the FRA.

Since October 2022, operations at the TTC have been managed by ENSCO under a "indefinite duration, indefinite quantity" (IDIQ) contract establishing responsibility for research and development, testing, engineering, and training services at the TTC.

== History ==
=== Site selection ===
Two United States Department of Commerce initiatives are credited with the genesis of the HSGTC: the Northeast Corridor Transportation Project (1964) and the High Speed Ground Transportation Act of 1965, which created the Office of High Speed Ground Transportation (OHSGT). OHSGT was absorbed by the FRA, part of the DOT, following that agency's creation in 1967. At the time, OHSGT, whose charter was to research and develop high speed rail transit, was investigating the use of magnetic or air cushion levitation of rail vehicles, but there were no suitable test sites. The 1968 amendment to the High Speed Ground Transportation Act authorized the Secretary of Transportation to acquire a test site. A proposed test site was investigated at the former Lowry Air Force Base near Denver, Colorado, but abandoned as the terrain was too rough; further site evaluation led the United States Secretary of Transportation to select the site for HSGTC near Pueblo in December 1969. The Pueblo site offered the advantage of varied weather conditions, with average mean temperatures ranging from 14 to 92 °F (−10 to 33 °C) and annual precipitation of 11.84 in (301 mm), including 31.7 in (810 mm) of snow.

Minimum site dimensions were dictated by the distance and geometry required for the high-speed trains under development to reach their top speeds of 250 to 300 mph (400 to 480 km/h); the minimum specified radius of curvature was 2.5 mi (4.0 km), making the planned test track/guideway oval approximately 5 mi × 8 mi (8.0 km × 12.9 km). Secretary John A. Volpe officially designated the site in January 1970; a 50-year lease was signed by the DOT and the State of Colorado on August 22, 1970. The state land board acquired several small parcels to assemble a contiguous site, and under the terms of the lease, the cost was $10 and had two renewal options. Grading, soil stabilization, and storm drain construction began that August. Access was initially provided by a county-owned gravel road, extended by 6 mi (9.7 km); later, a 19 mi-long (31 km) paved road was built from the Pueblo Memorial Airport. The first extension has been exercised and the lease has been extended through August 22, 2070.

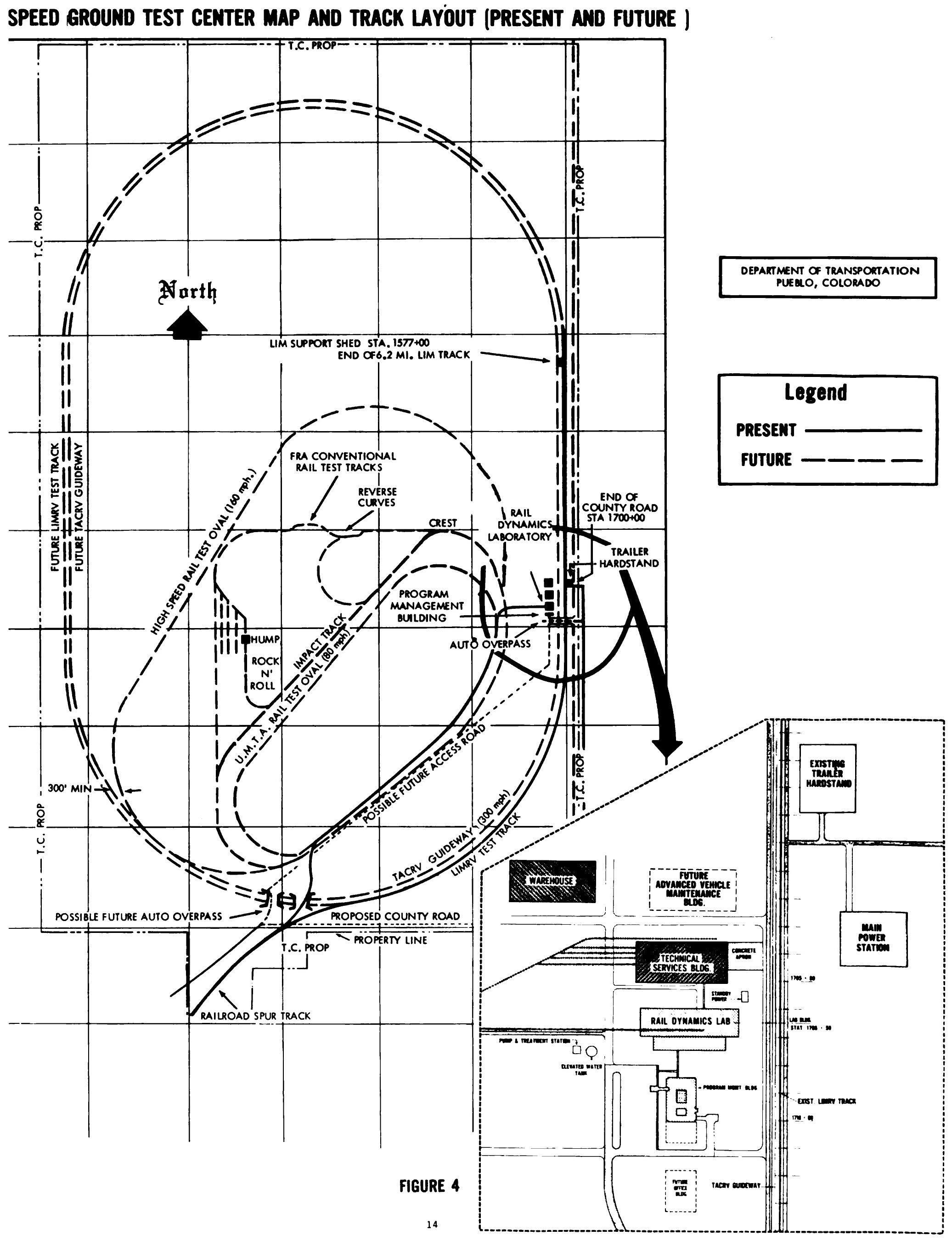
(1971); 1 square = 1 mi (1.6 km)

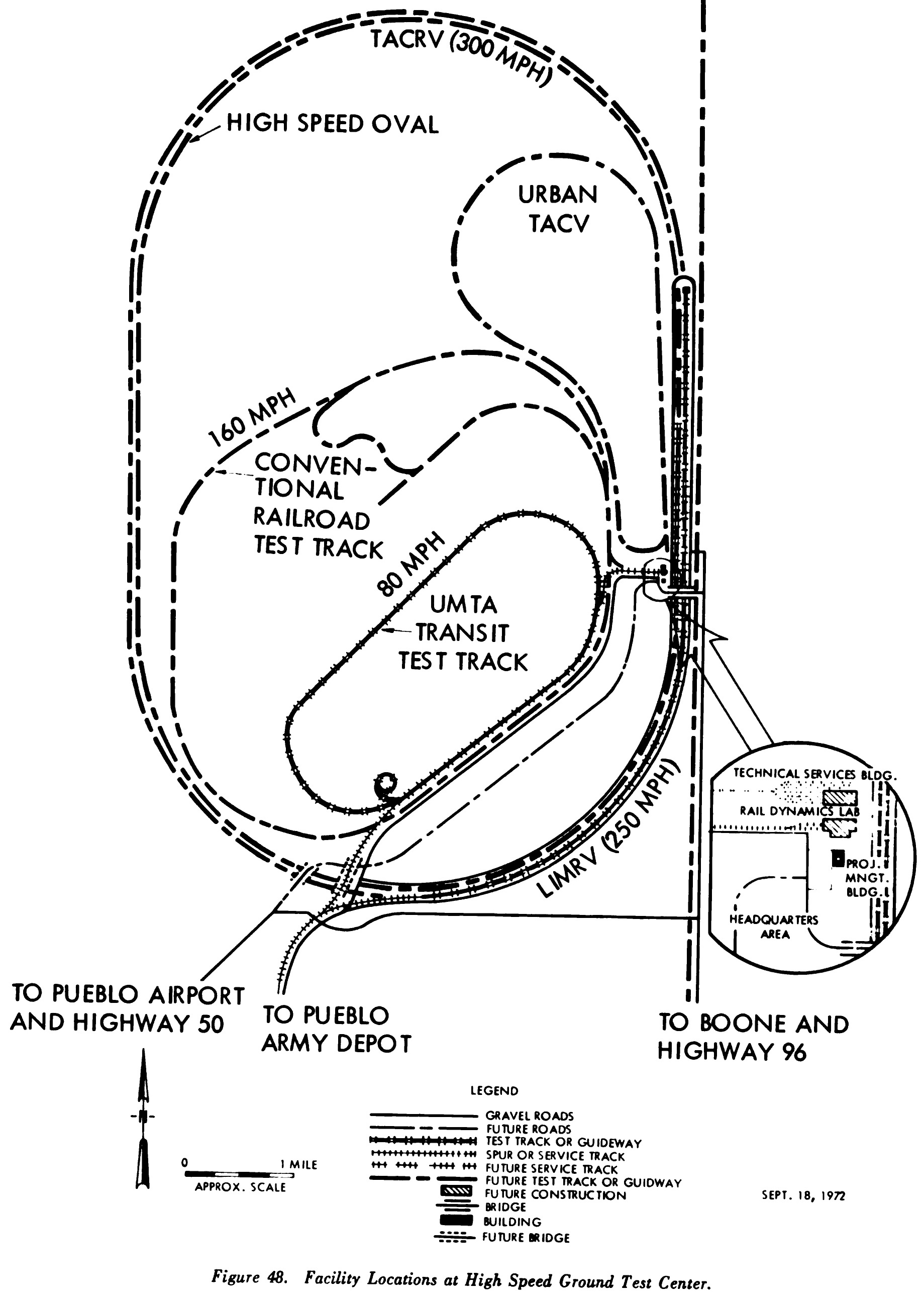
(1972)

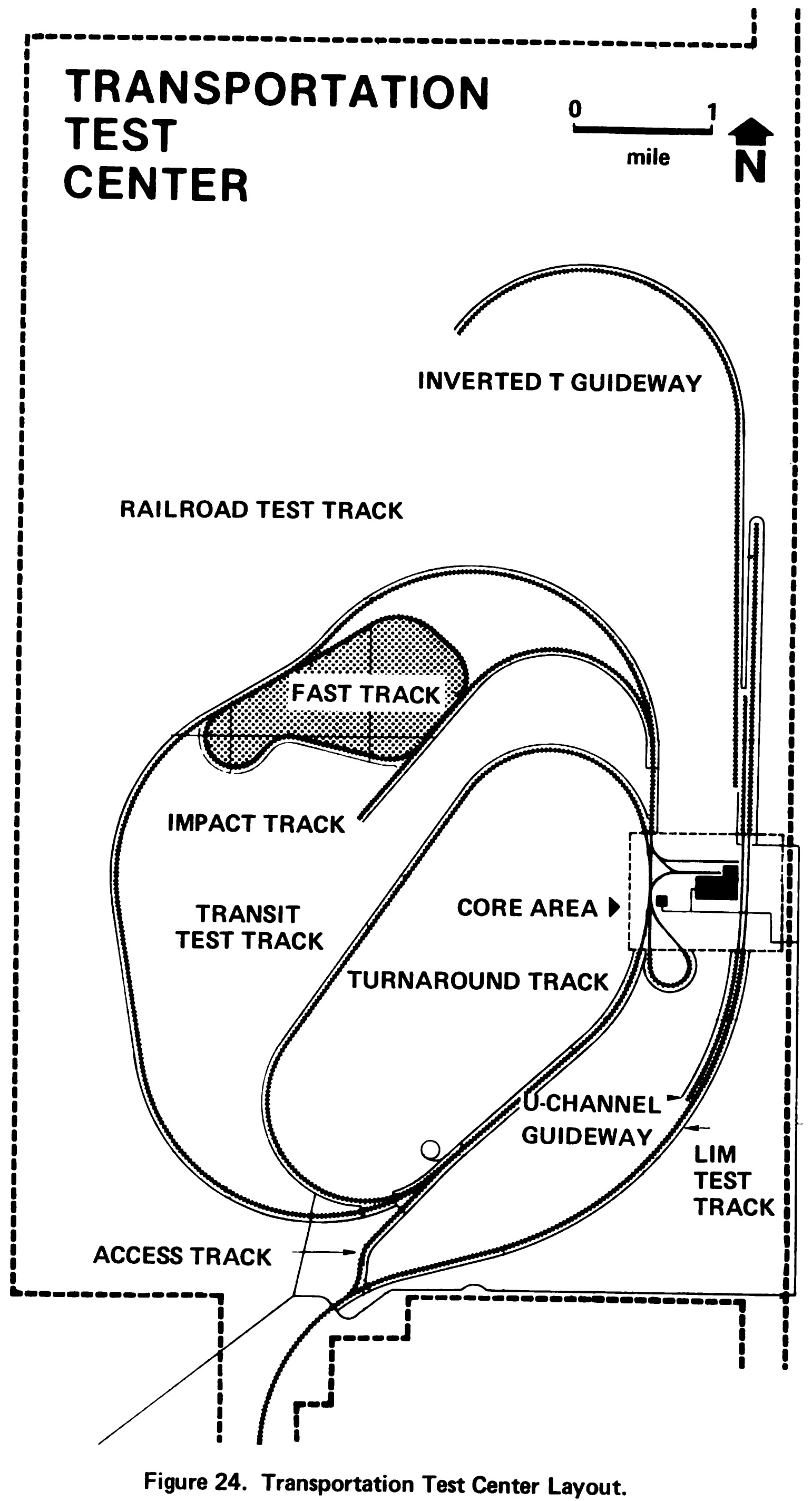
(1977)

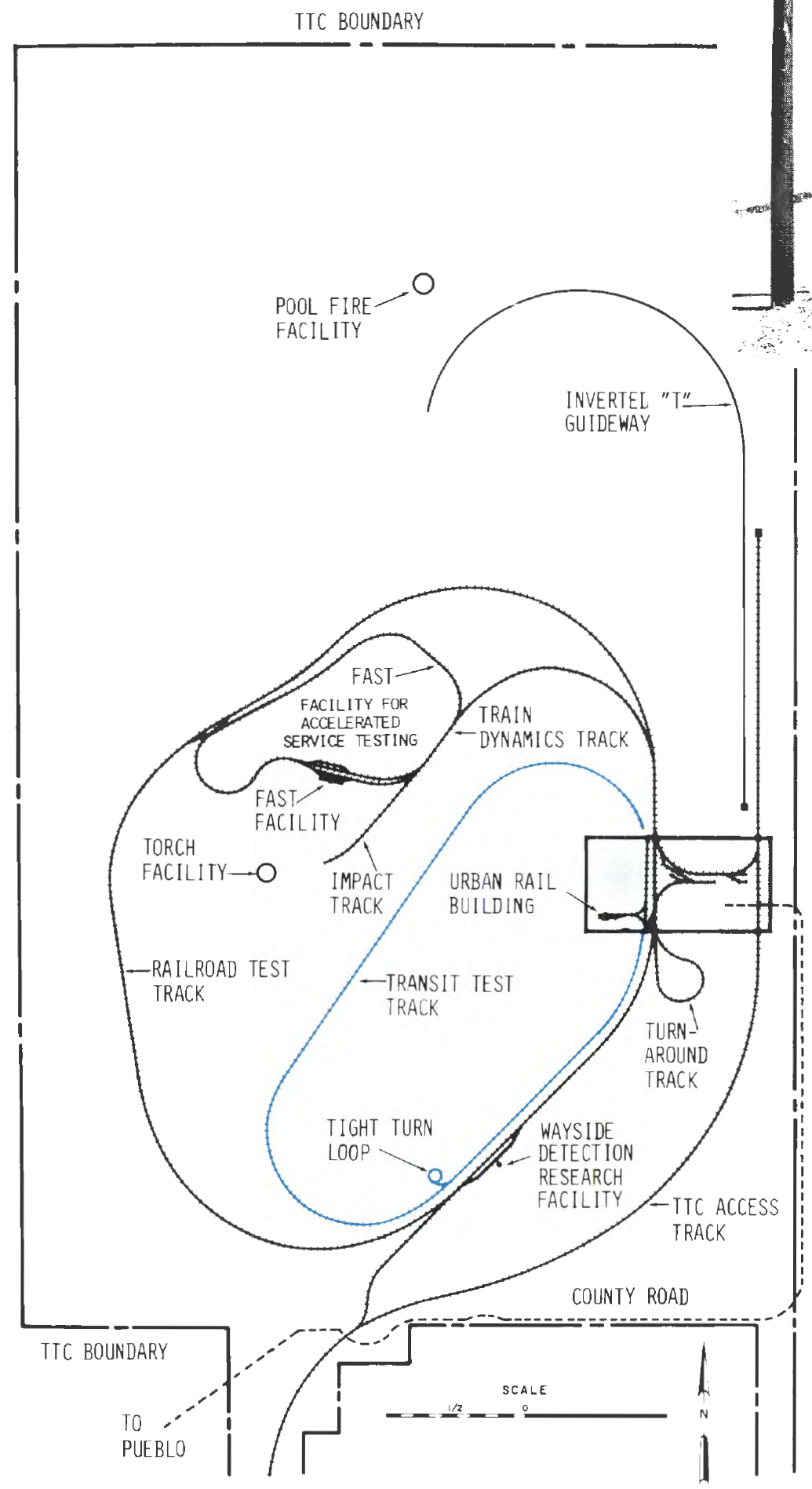
(1981); map below shows buildings

=== Initial construction ===
The first track to be started onsite was an initial 6 mi (9.7 km) segment of the planned Linear Induction Motor Research Vehicle (LIMRV) test track, built by Morrison-Knudsen; it was anticipated that the initial segment would later be extended to a full 21.8 mi-long (35.1 km) oval and a parallel oval guideway would be completed for the Tracked Air Cushion Research Vehicle (TACRV). In addition, preliminary design work continued for the Suspended Vehicle System (SVS) and the Tube Vehicle System (TVS); SVS was designed to take advantage of existing rights-of-way and be capable of greater roll angles (and higher speeds), and TVS was expected to operate in all weather conditions at speeds up to 500 mph (800 km/h). The TACRV program was planned to be further developed into an Urban Tracked Air Cushion Vehicle (UTACV), with two separate designs by Vought (using a U-Channel guideway) and Rohr, Inc. (using an inverted-T guideway) operating at speeds up to 150 mph (240 km/h).

The initial segment of the LIMRV Test Track and a temporary Maintenance Shed were completed in April 1971; the HSGTC was dedicated on May 19, 1971, marked by a ceremony and ridealong by Secretary Volpe in the LIMRV. Although the FRA retained overall management of the facility, other government agencies were encouraged to participate, and the Urban Mass Transportation Administration (UMTA) constructed the Rapid Transit Test Track (TTT) onsite to test transit cars; the initial 2.4 mi (3.9 km) segment of a planned 9.1 mi (14.6 km) oval was started in March 1971 and completed in August by Morrison-Knudsen. The remaining 6.7 miles (10.8 km) were completed in September 1972 and checked on September 8 using locomotive DOTX 001 and two NYCTA R42 subway cars. DOTX 001 was a 3,000 hp (2,200 kW) GE U30C locomotive, the first rolling stock purchased for the HSGTC in FY1971. It is now retired and in the collection of the Pueblo Railway Museum. The R42 cars were designated Test Car T-2 and T-3.

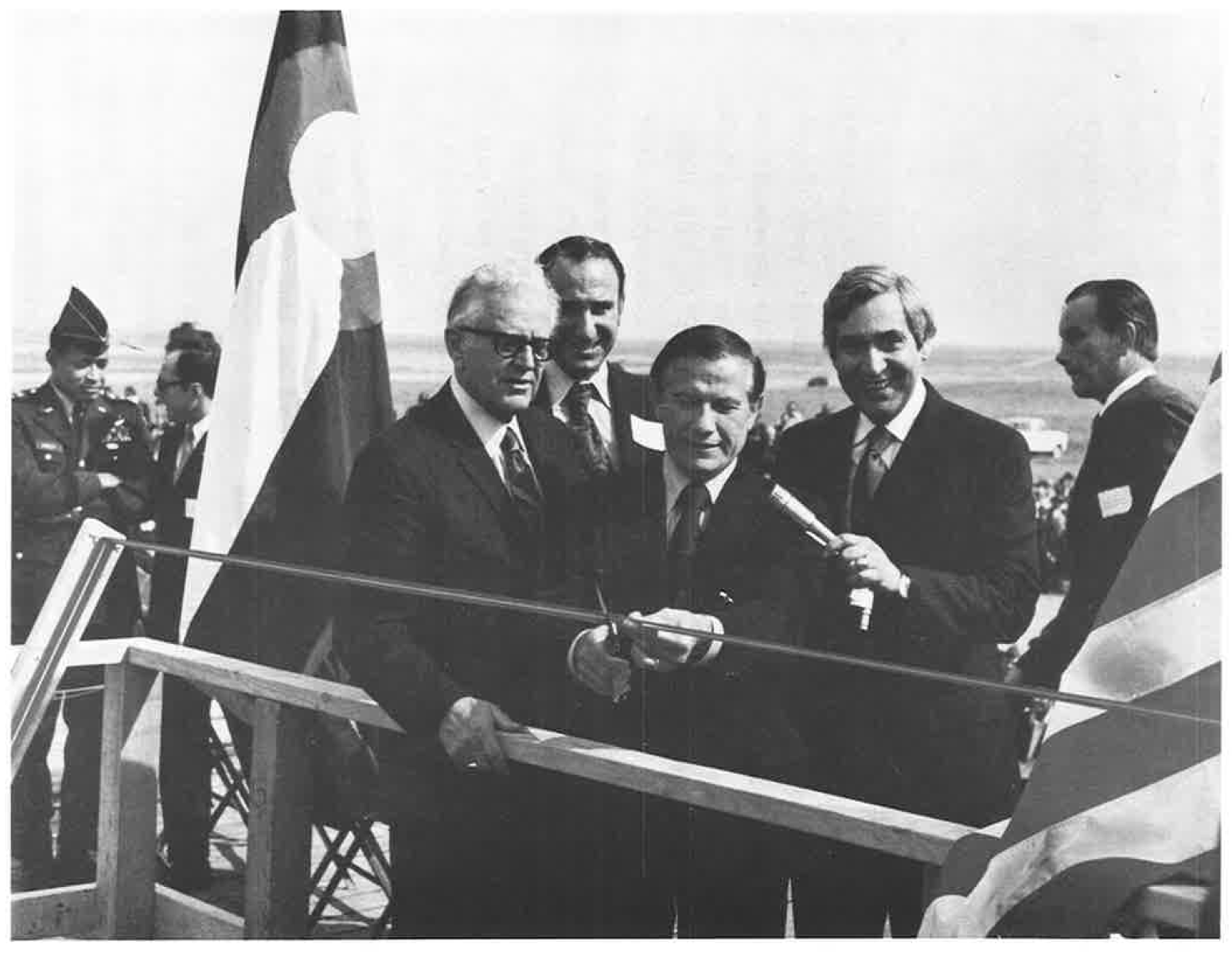
TTT dedication at the HSGTC (Oct 12, 1972). L–R: Sen. Gordon Allott, Cong. Frank Evans, Transportation Sec'y John Volpe, and UMTA Administrator Carlos Villarreal

The TTT was dedicated on October 12, 1972, during a ceremony that also included the unveiling of the State-of-the-Art Car (SOAC); the principal speaker was Secretary Volpe. By 1972, plans to complete the LIMRV test track oval had been dropped, although a similarly sized oval would be built for the TACRV guideway, and plans for an 11 mi (18 km) oval guideway for the UTACV had been added. In addition to SOAC testing, other early tests conducted at HSGTC included the evaluation of the US Standard Light Rail Vehicle (US SLRV). TTT initially offered testing with an electrified third rail; overhead catenary wire was added to TTT in summer 1975 to test the US SLRV.

Temporary site headquarters and personnel offices initially were set up in five trailers to support early testing; the Program Management Building (PMB) was the first permanent structure to be completed, housing administrative personnel, designed by Bertrum Bruton Associates (of Denver); the PMB was completed and occupied in February 1972. The East Auto Overpass was completed in July 1972, spanning the LIMRV test track. The Rail Dynamics Laboratory (RDL), the first laboratory building onsite, was designed by Wyle Laboratories in 1970 and construction began in July 1972, by Houston Construction/Wilkins Construction. A well and water storage tank were completed in January 1973. Work on the Center Services Building (CSB) began in 1973, and design of an Operations building also started that year to relieve overcrowding in the PMB. The RDL was completed and occupied by April 1974, but the simulator had not yet been installed; multiple issues with development led to the simulator being redesigned to a double-ended vertical shaker and separate rolling unit without vibration. The CSB and Ops building were completed in January and August 1975, respectively.

=== Renaming ===
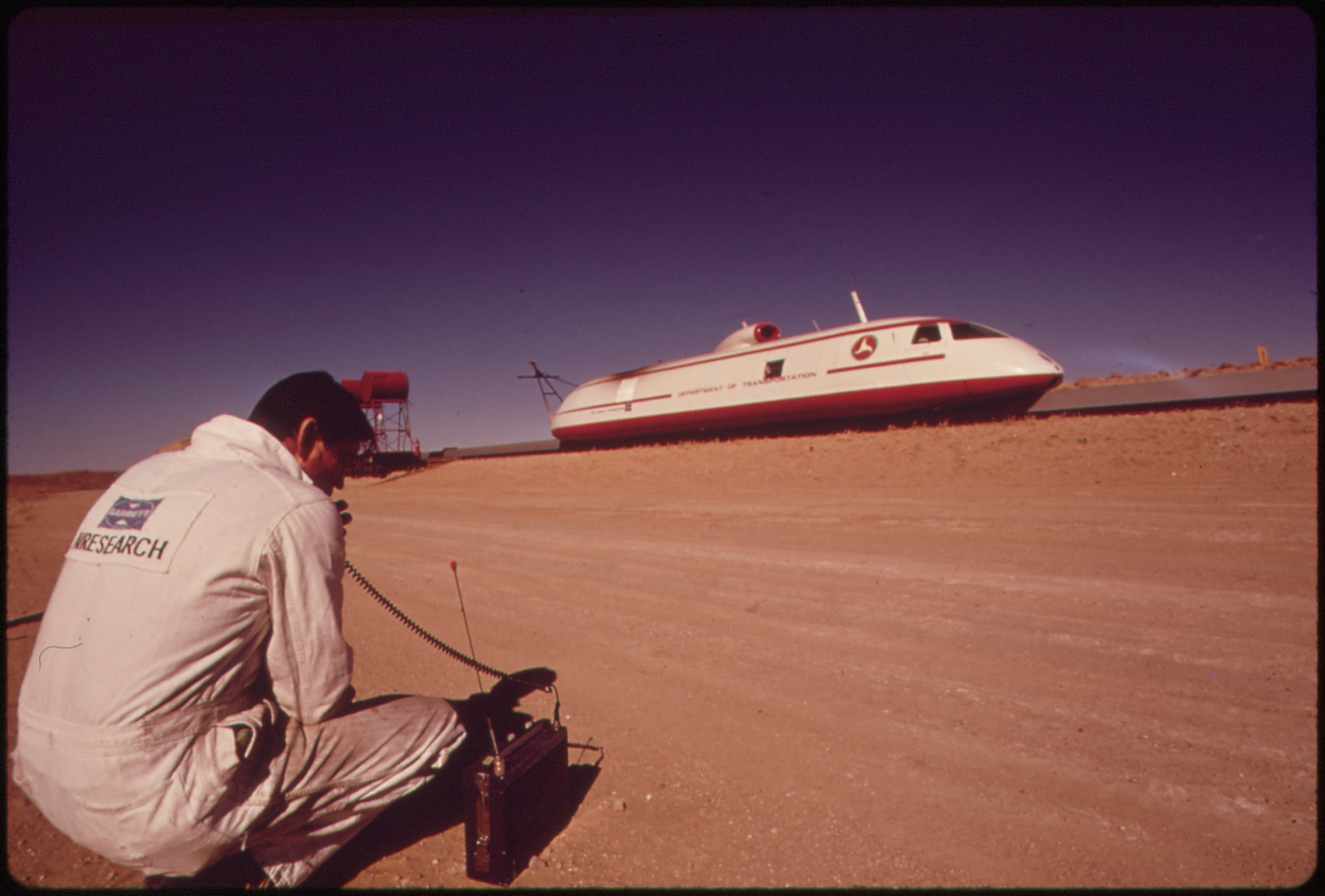
LIMRV testing at HSGTC

The LIMRV set a world record for rail vehicle speed at HSGTC on August 14, 1974, 255.4 mph (411.0 km/h). The site had cost $55 million to construct to-date, and plans were advancing to continue research on hovertrains. Meanwhile, the first 1.5 mi (2.4 km) segment of TACRV guideway was completed in March 1973, and a second segment of equal length was completed in November 1973. The UTACV program selected Rohr to build a Prototype Tracked Air Cushion Vehicle (PTACV), and construction of an inverted-T guideway began in May 1973.

However, the high-speed aspect of rail transportation began to be de-emphasized and the HSGTC was renamed to the Transportation Test Center (TTC) in December 1974 to reflect its new mission. A contract was let in 1972 to begin grading the route for the Railroad Test Track (RTT), a planned 14 mi (23 km) high-speed loop operating conventional rail vehicles up to 160 mph (260 km/h); within the high-speed loop, a Dynamics Track sub-loop 9.9 mi (15.9 km) long would investigate passenger and freight train dynamics at slower speeds. The first portions of RTT completed were the Impact Track, 0.76 mi (1.22 km) long, and a segment of the Dynamics Track, which totaled 5.7 mi (9.2 km) long at full build. Work on the high-speed loop was started in 1975. A static facility was added to test tank car thermal insulation, named the Tank Car Torch Test Facility.

The Facility for Accelerated Service Testing (FAST) is a dedicated facility to study wear and fatigue of railroad track; it first was recommended in September 1975. Tracks were laid for FAST within the RTT loop at TTC starting in spring 1976 and the first train began operating over the FAST loop on September 22, 1976. Trains operated at relatively low speeds up to 35 mph (56 km/h) for 16 hours a day; one early conclusion was that steel railroad ties were impractical, as they began to crack after bearing 26 million gross tons of freight. In June 1985, a cut-off track was completed, shortening the FAST loop from 4.78 to 2.72 mi (7.69 to 4.38 km), its present length; the shortened loop was renamed the High Tonnage Loop (HTL). Typically, TTC operated 100-ton cars over the HTL, so named for their loading capacity; with an empty car weight of 31.5 short tons (28.6 t), the total weight of 131.5 short tons (119.3 t) translates to a per-axle load of 33 short tons (30 t). In 1988, 125-ton cars were added to consists, better reflecting actual loads and capacities in the United States. The 125-ton car has a tare weight of 33 short tons (30 t) and an axle load of 39 short tons (35 t). This change was implemented as the Heavy Axle Load (HAL) program.

In Fiscal Year 1995, the TTC received its most recent name change to the Transportation Technology Center, reflecting "a major consolidation of activities and broadening of functions conducted at TTC".

=== Public-private partnership ===
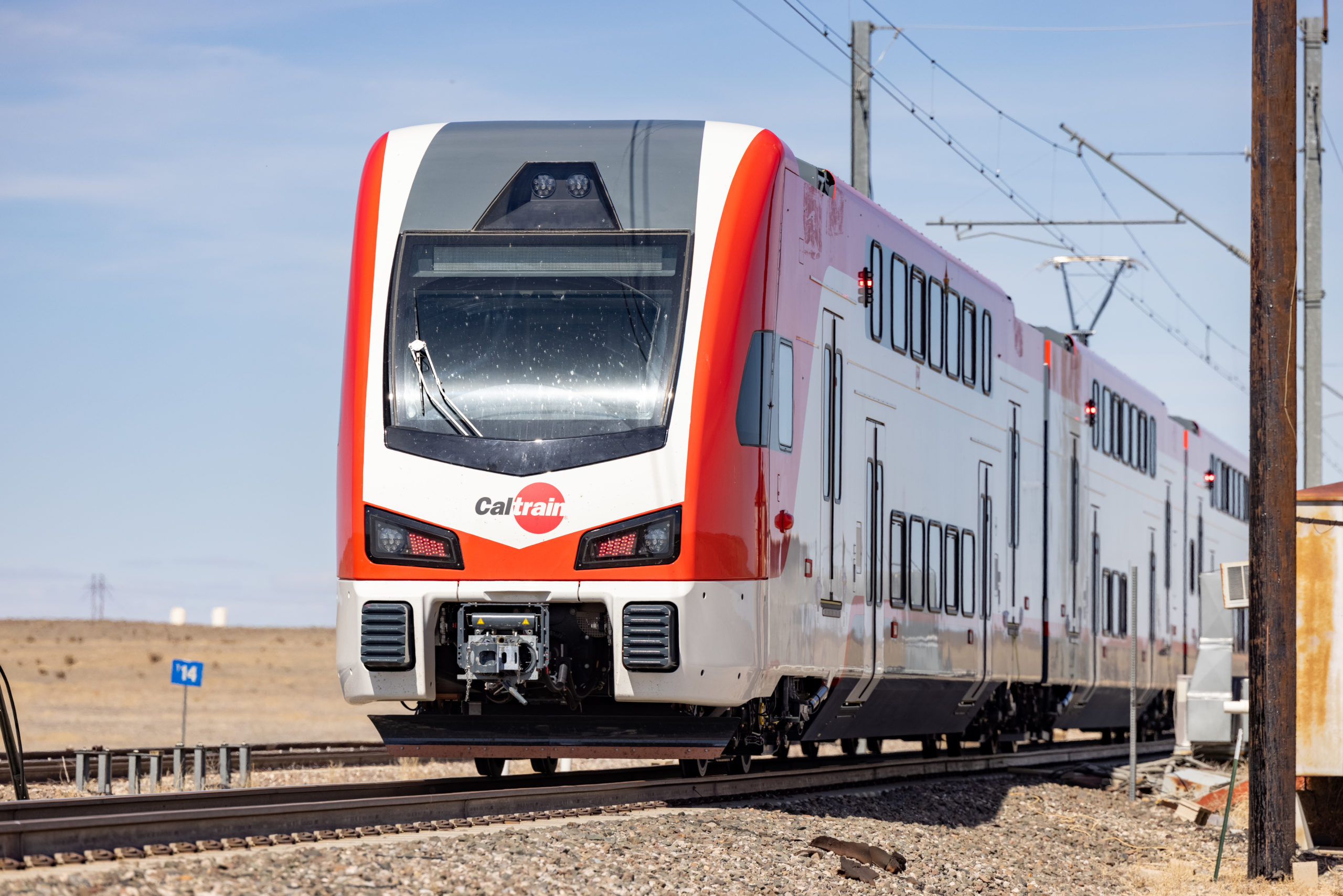
A Caltrain Stadler KISS EMU undergoing testing at the TTC in April 2021.

Operations and maintenance (O&M) of the site typically has been supported by a contractor since the first permanent buildings were completed; a request for proposals was issued in Fiscal Year 1971, soliciting bids for an operations contractor, which would support test contractors, provide test track maintenance, and housekeeping services. The first O&M contractor was Kentron-Hawaii, Ltd., starting from July 1972. Dynelectron won a competitive re-bid for the O&M contract in 1976. Due to reduced funding that threatened to close the facility, the FRA entered a public-private partnership with AAR in October 1982, who would take over "care, custody, and control" of TTC. AAR consolidated its Research & Test Department at TTC from 1995 to 1997 and formed its TTCI subsidiary to administer the contract on January 1, 1998 and the contract has been renewed periodically as a single-source award since then.

In March 2021, the FRA awarded the "care, custody, and control" contract to ENSCO, who assumed responsibility for operations and maintenance of TTC in October 2022. In addition, ENSCO will expand the use of TTC to support more general ground transportation research. The former TTCI was subsequently renamed as MxV Rail in March 2022.

== Facility ==
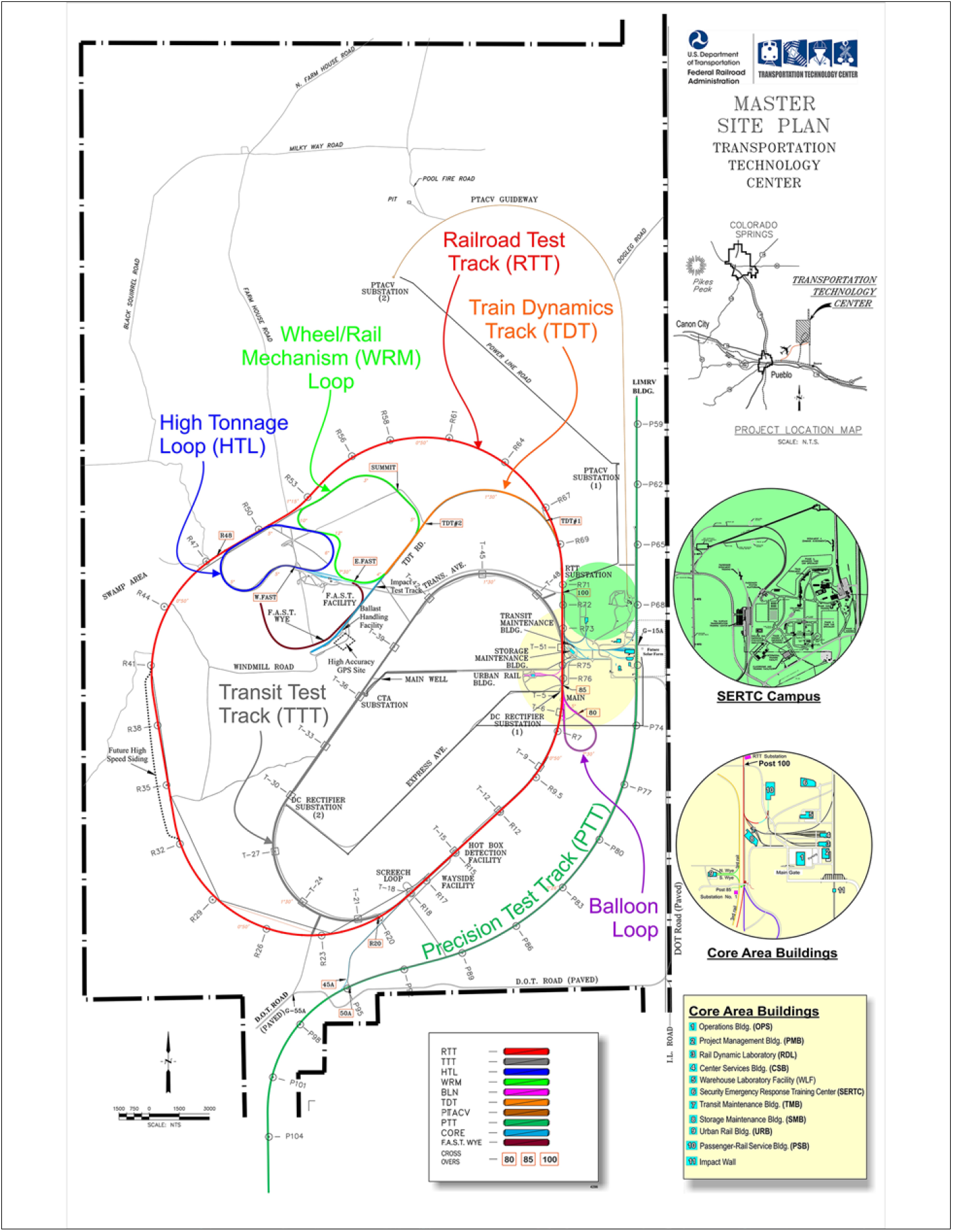
2015 as-built plan

The Transportation Technology Center occupies a 30,000-acre (12,000 ha) site northeast of Pueblo, Colorado and just north of the US Army's Pueblo Chemical Depot. The site has laboratories and approximately 48 miles (77 km) of railroad track used to test locomotives, vehicles, track components, and signaling devices. The tracks are designed to replicate conditions seen on service environments, varying from precisely engineered high-speed tracks to track intentionally designed with irregularities.

=== Tracks and guideways ===
- Railroad Test Track (RTT): 13.5-mile (21.7 km) loop permitting speeds of 165 miles per hour (266 km/h) and equipped with overhead catenary capable of supplying power at 12.5 kV, 25 kV, and 50 kV. The RTT is used to test the performance and endurance of vehicles at high speeds. The track has one 1,525-metre (5,003 ft) radius curve, four 800-metre (2,600 ft) radius curves, and a balloon loop to turn trains around and test a tighter curve. The RTT also has a section of track called the High Speed Adjustable Perturbation Slab (HS-APS) or Precision Geometry Slab Track, which can be adjusted to introduce irregularities.
- Transit Test Track (TTT): 9.1-mile (14.6 km) loop permitting speeds of 80 miles per hour (130 km/h) and equipped with a DC electrified third rail capable of supplying power at up to 1,150 volts and up to 12,000 amps. It was initially built for the UMTA as the Rapid Transit Test Track and is completely contained within the RTT. It incorporates six different types of construction to simulate track conditions at various rail transit agencies, with grades ranging up to 1.4665%.
  - The TTT also has a section of track called the Tight Turn Loop (also known as the "screech loop"), with a 150-foot (46 m) radius, used to investigate wheel noise and car curving performance.
- Facility for Accelerated Service Testing (FAST): Initially completed in 1976 as a 4.8 mi (7.7 km) test loop, then split in 1983 to form the HTL and WRM.
  - High Tonnage Loop (HTL): 2.7-mile (4.3 km) loop designed to quickly test both rolling stock and track components, such as rail, ties, switches, ballast, and bridges. As part of the FAST program, a full-scale train with three EMD SD70 locomotives and 110 cars each loaded with 315,000-pound of weight regularly operates over the HTL at speeds of up to 40 miles per hour (64 km/h). The equipment used is on loan from AAR member railroads, and the program is funded by AAR member railroads and railroad suppliers often contribute their components for testing. Since 1976, the FAST program has operated up to 140-million gross tons per year over the HTL.
  - Wheel/Rail Mechanism Track (WRM): 3.5-mile (5.6 km) loop designed to test vehicle performance over track that has several different types of curves and intentional irregularities designed to induce poor performance.
- Precision Test Track (PTT): 6.2-mile (10.0 km) segment designed with intentional irregularities to test vehicles for dynamic pitch and bounce, dynamic twist and roll, and dynamic yaw and sway. It was initially used as the LIMRV Test Track.
- Train Dynamics Track (TDT) and the Impact Facility or Impact Track: Track designed for crash-testing to determine crashworthiness and crash energy management. Facility is built to withstand loads of 3,000,000 lbs as vehicles impact a stationary object. Two trains can also be crashed into each other at the facility. Other sections of the TDT evaluate rail vehicle dynamic responses to grades, curves, switches, humps, and yard tracks. The TDT is 1.7 mi (2.7 km) long and the Impact Track is 4,400 ft (1.3 km) long.

In addition, there are two leftover guideways constructed during the HSGTC period:

- Prototype Track Air Cushion Vehicle Guideway: Inverted-T guideway, designed for operation at 150 mph (240 km/h), 5.7 mi (9.2 km) long.
- Tracked Levitated Air Cushion Vehicle Guideway: U-shaped concrete channel, used between 1973 and 1976. The channel is 18 ft 7 in (5.66 m) wide and 5 mi (8.0 km) long. A Vehicle Impact Wall capable of withstanding an impact load of 3,000,000 lbf (13,000,000 N) was built on the site of the TLRV guideway in October 2008.
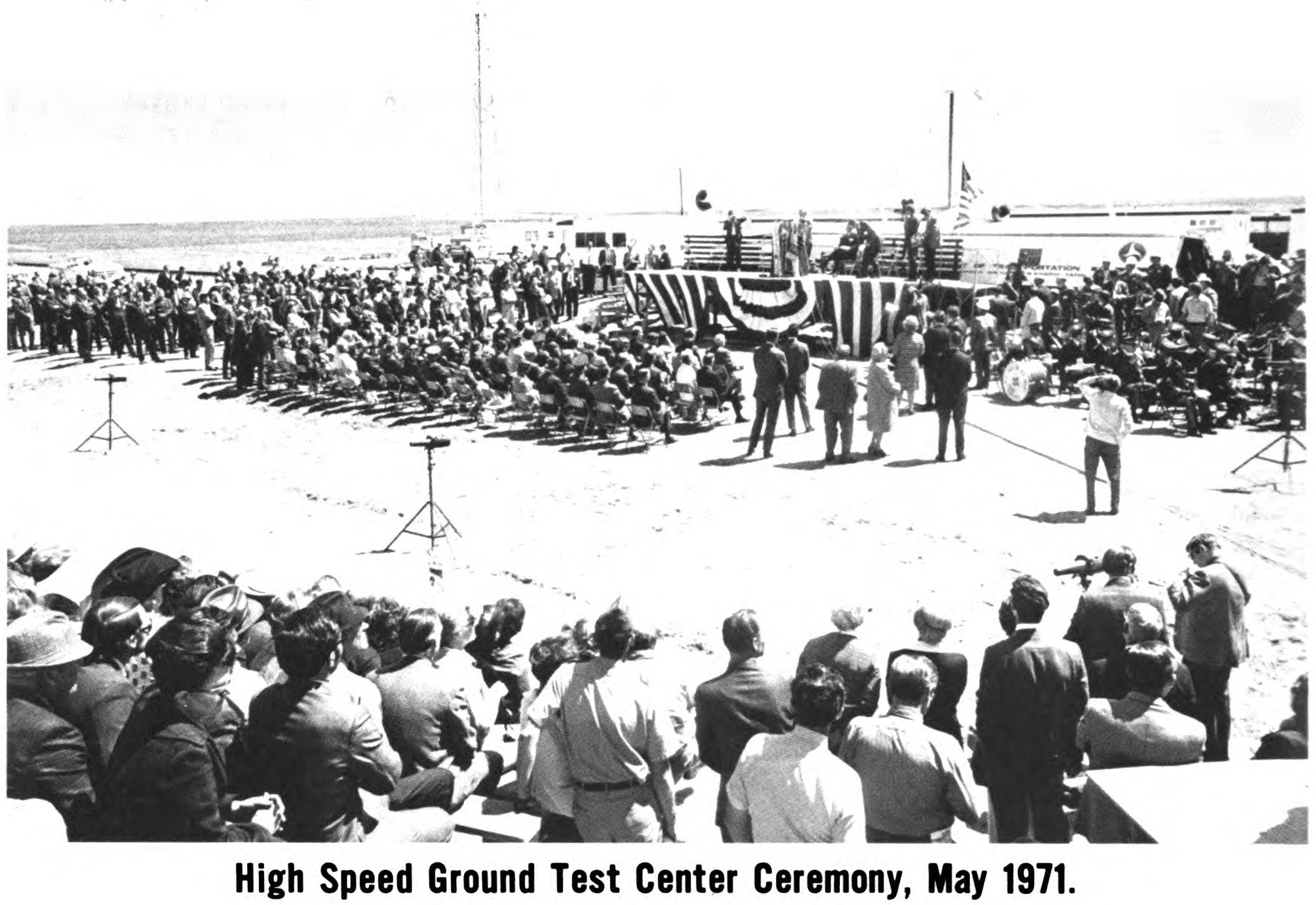
LIMRV Test Track dedication (May 19, 1971)

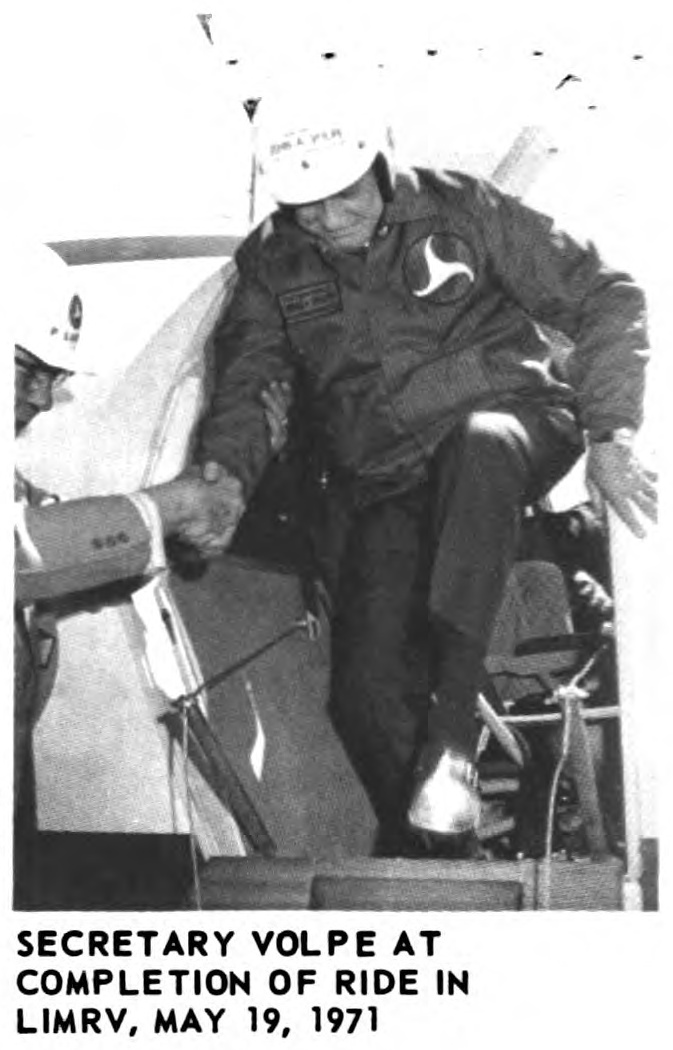
Secretary Volpe exits the LIMRV (1971)

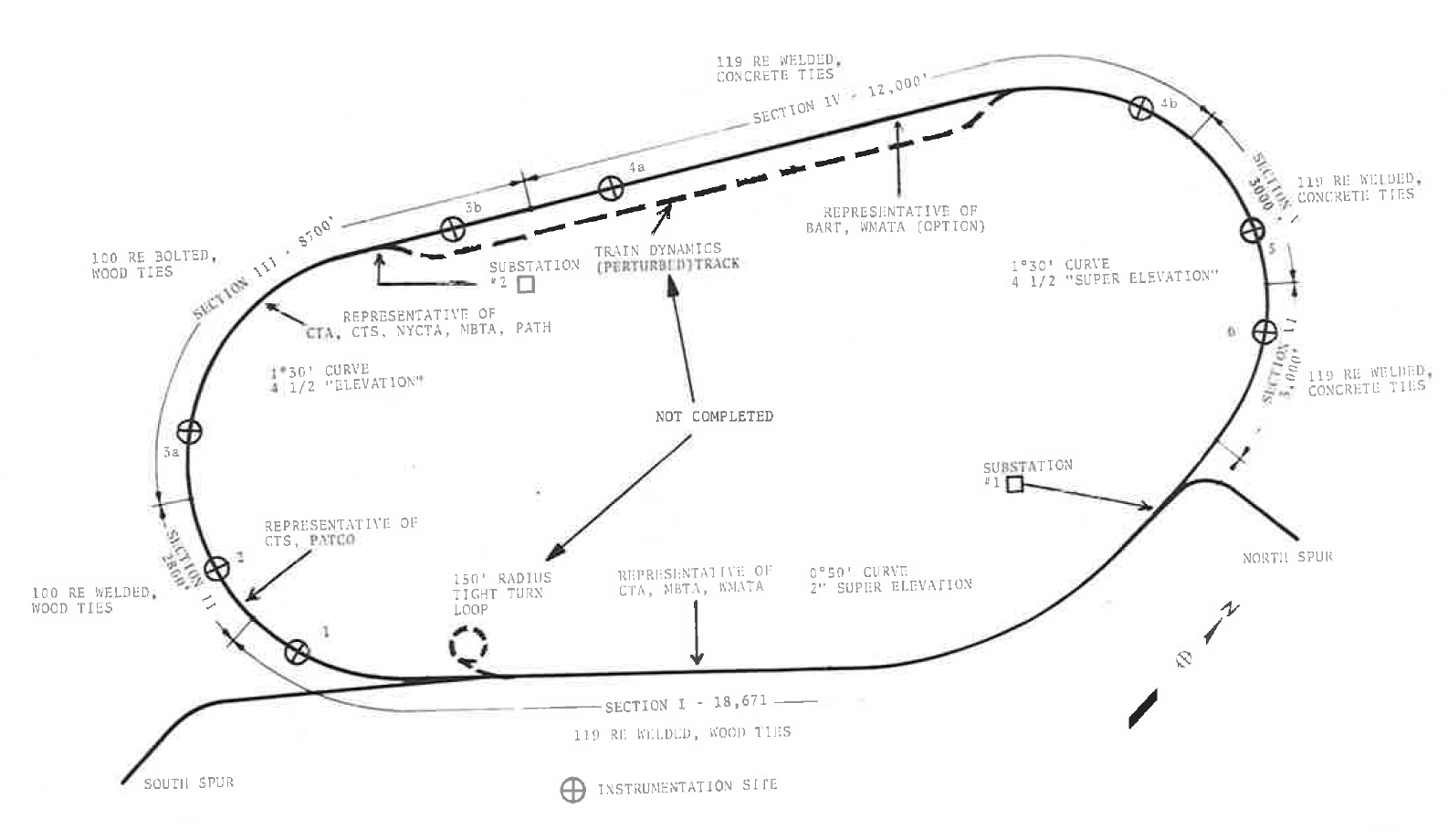
Plan of the TTT, first test loop at TTC (1972)

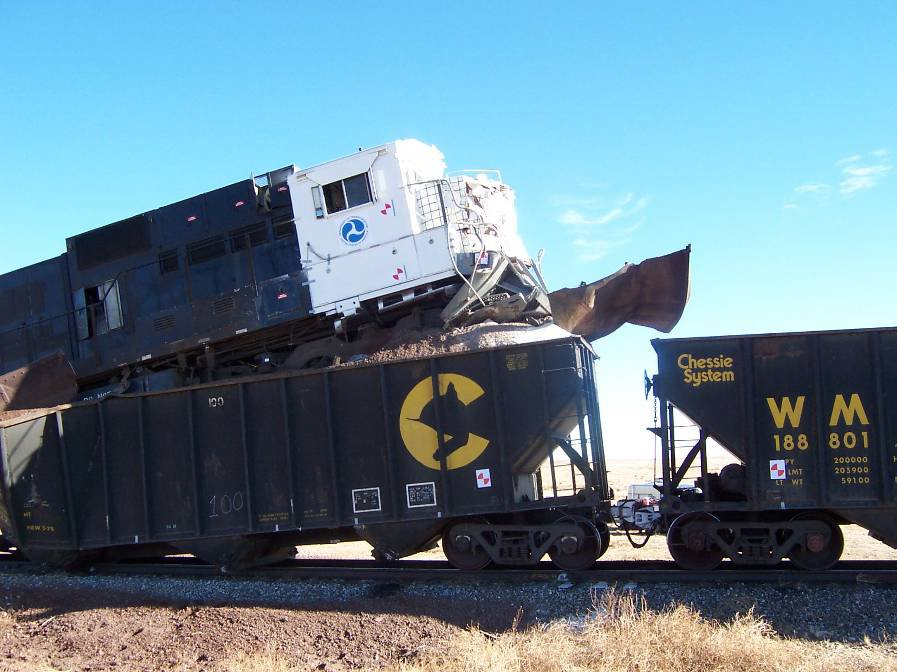
Aftermath of a test at the TTC in which a locomotive intentionally hit a hopper car

=== Buildings and structures ===
Selected buildings at the Transportation Technology Center
1 Operations Building
2 Project Management Building
3 Rail Dynamics Laboratory
4 Center Services Building
5 Warehouse/Laboratory Facility and Components Test Laboratory
6 Security and Emergency Response Training Center
7 Transit Maintenance Building
8 Storage & Maintenance Building
9 Urban Rail Building
10 Passenger Rail Services Building

In addition to the test tracks, there are several buildings at the site.

- 1 Operations Building (OPS) and 2 Project Management Building (PMB): administrative offices, including the center's cafeteria. OPS was completed in 1976 and expanded in 1980, and has a total interior floor area of 54,487 ft^{2} (5,062.0 m^{2}). The PMB, completed in 1972 at 17,400 ft^{2} (1,620 m^{2}) of space, was abandoned in 2007 due to the presence of asbestos-containing ceiling materials.
- 3 Rail Dynamics Laboratory (RDL): evaluates rail vehicle dynamic responses to simulated track irregularities, including the Vibration Test Unit, which can accommodate vehicles up to 180 feet (55 m) in length with axle loads up to 80,000 pounds (36,000 kg) on a curve radius as short as 100 feet (30 m), using actuators to simulate dynamic loads on a static vehicle. The other major machine within RDL is the Roll Dynamics Unit, which is a dynamometer that simulates travel over perfectly smooth rails at more than 144 mph (232 km/h). Two bridge cranes are used to move rail vehicles between the two machines. The high bay at RDL measures 330 ft × 112 ft × 60 ft (101 m × 34 m × 18 m) (L×W×H)
- 4 Center Services Building (CSB): includes equipment for maintenance and repair of rail vehicles and test equipment, including a wheel truing machine. CSB also has a high bay, measuring 367 ft × 100 ft × 50 ft (112 m × 30 m × 15 m) (L×W×H).
- 5 Warehouse (WLF) and Components Test Lab (CTL): mechanical, metallurgical, instrumentation, and metrology laboratories. The two buildings jointly contain 53,428 ft^{2} (4,963.6 m^{2}) of floor space and were completed in 1979 and 1980.
- 6 Security and Emergency Response Training Center (SERTC): originally built as the PTACV maintenance facility in 1974 as a prefabricated metal building; training in hazardous material response began in 1985 and four more classrooms were added in 1995.
- 7 Transit Maintenance Building (TMB): the original building completed in 1973 to support operations on the TTT, largely duplicating equipment and facilities from the URB. It is a prefabricated metal building measuring 40 ft × 192 ft (12 m × 59 m) (W×L).
- 8 Storage and Maintenance Building (SMB): Also a prefabricated metal building, completed in 1973, measuring 130 ft × 277 ft (40 m × 84 m) (W×L).
- 9 Urban Rail Building (URB): a 20,000 ft^{2} (1,900 m^{2}) building within the TTT oval that has complete maintenance facilities for transit vehicles. There are two 190-foot (58 m) long service tracks through the building, a maintenance pit under one of the service tracks, and a 600V DC power supply. The URB is the permanent maintenance facility for TTT, completed in 1980.
- 10 Passenger Rail Services Building (PSB): completed as the Japan Rail Facility in 1999 and 2000, a prefabricated metal building; renamed to PSB during the completion of the second phase (2005–08) which added a high bay facility.

== Rolling stock ==
In addition to its test tracks and laboratories, TTC also operates several locomotives, including:

Locomotives at TTC
Name	Mfr.	Model	Year	Notes
DOT 203	EMD	GP40-2	1978	Built new for the DOT; 3,000 hp (2,200 kW) capable of speeds up to 107 mph (172 km/h) with modified trucks and gearing
DOT 004	EMD	GP9	1954	Originally built for Union Pacific as No. 205; retired 1978 and sold to Precision National Corporation; rebuilt in 1980 for DOT; 1,850 hp (1,380 kW) capable of speeds up to 65 mph (105 km/h)
AAR 2000	EMD	GP40	1966	Geared for 107 mph (172 km/h)
TTCI 2001	EMD	GP40-2	1977	Geared for 107 mph (172 km/h). Ex-DOT 003
DOTX 4113	EMD	F40PH-2CAT	1977	Geared for 107 mph (172 km/h)
DOT 928	EMD/ Alstom	AEM-7AC	1981/2002	Ex. Amtrak, used for the testing of high speed equipment
DOT 942	EMD/Alstom	AEM-7AC	1982/2002	Ex. Amtrak, used for the testing of high speed equipment
EMDX 169	EMD	SDP40F	1973-1974	Ex-Amtrak, heavily modified by EMD to test the EMD 710 prime mover, currently used on the FAST loop
EMDX 218	EMD	SDP40F	1973-1974	Ex-Amtrak, heavily modified by EMD to test the EMD 710 prime mover, currently used on the FAST loop

Similar to DOT 004, DOT 005 and 006 also were ex-UP EMD GP9s (No. 147 and 162, respectively) that were sold to Precision National in 1979 and rebuilt for the Department of Transportation.
