= American Railway Association =

US industry trade group

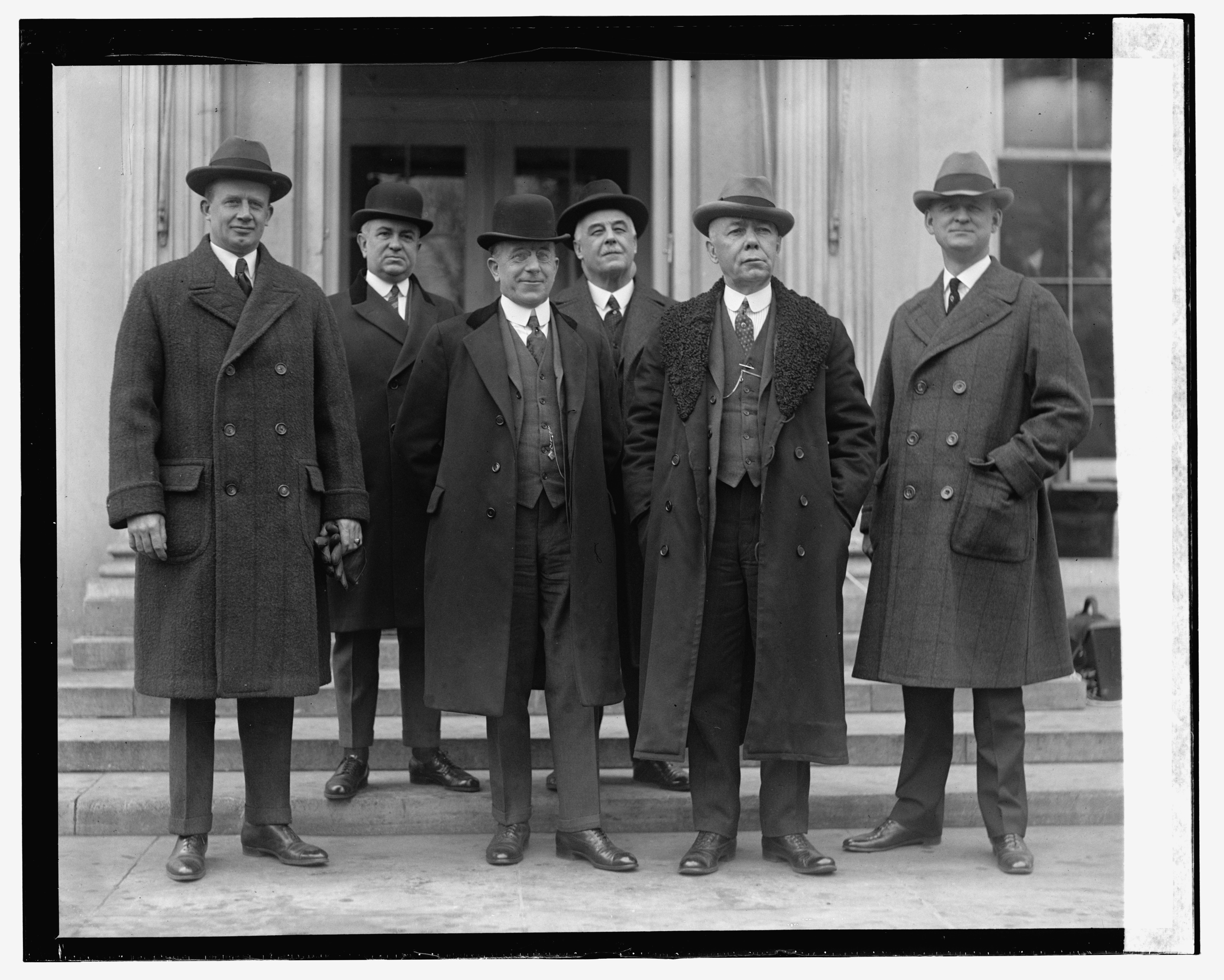
- Members of the American Railway Association in 1924
- Abbreviation: ARA
- Formation: 1892
- Dissolved: 1934
- Type: Trade Association
- Legal status: Defunct
- Purpose: Advocate for railroad industry
- Location: United States
- Region served: North America
- Members: Railroads and associates
- Official language: English

The American Railway Association (ARA) was an industry trade group representing railroads in the United States. The organization had its inception in meetings of General Managers and ranking railroad operating officials known as Time Table Conventions, the first of which was held on October 1, 1872, at Louisville, Kentucky. In 1875, the group changed its name to General Time Convention and in October 1892, to American Railway Association. In January 1919, ten separate groups of operating officers were amalgamated with the association and carried on their activities as divisions, sections or committees of the larger group.

On October 12, 1934, the ARA ceased to exist, having joined with several other railroad industry trade groups to merge into the Association of American Railroads.

== Officers ==
- 1890–1896, Henry S. Haines, President
- 1907, W. C. Brown, President
- 1915, J. T. King, President
- 1917, W. W. Atterbury, President
- 1921, Daniel Willard, Chairman of the Board
- 1921, R. H. Aishton, President

== See also ==
- American Railway Engineering and Maintenance-of-Way Association (AREMA)
- Association of American Railroads
- History of rail transport in the United States
- Railroad chronometer
