= List of Amtrak rolling stock =

Amtrak operates a fleet of 1,957 railway cars and 332 locomotives for revenue service and railroad operations, collectively referred to as its rolling stock. Notable examples include the GE Genesis and Siemens Charger diesel locomotives, the Siemens ACS-64 electric locomotive, the Amfleet and Viewliner series of single-level passenger cars, the Superliner series of double-decker passenger cars, and Acela Express and Avelia Liberty high-speed trainsets. In addition, Amtrak operates 196 locomotives and railcars that are wholly owned by its state partners.

The railroad is currently undertaking a fleet replacement effort, buying 28 NextGen Acela (Avelia Liberty) trainsets for its flagship Acela service and 83 Amtrak Airo trainsets for other Northeast Corridor services. Separately, California and a consortium of Midwestern states have purchased Siemens Venture trainsets for use on Amtrak-operated routes within their regions; these began entering service in 2022. In 2023, Amtrak issued a request for proposals to replace hundreds of bilevel railcars used on long-distance routes, and a similar RFP for single-level long-distance railcars was issued in 2025. Both RFPs were cancelled in early 2026 in favor of a standardized single-level long-distance fleet.

== Current ==
=== Locomotives ===
Amtrak operates diesel, electric, and dual-mode (diesel or electric) locomotives. Its electric locomotives are confined to the Northeast Corridor and the Philadelphia to Harrisburg Main Line, dual-mode locomotives are only used in the Empire Corridor between Albany and New York, and the diesel locomotives are used in all other areas across the United States.

Model	Thumbnail	Road numbers	Active fleet	Year	Power type	Owner
Road power
GE Dash 8-32BWH		500–519	20	1991	Diesel	Amtrak
GE Genesis P42DC		1–207	155	1996–2001	Diesel	Amtrak
GE Genesis P32AC-DM		700–717	17	1995	Dual-mode	Amtrak
Siemens ACS-64		600–665, 667–670	67	2014	Electric	Amtrak
Siemens Charger ALC-42		300–424	83 (125)	2021	Diesel	Amtrak
State-owned road power
GE Dash 8-32BWH		2051, 2052	1	1991	Diesel	Caltrans
EMD F59PH		1776, 1810, 1859, 1869, 1893	5	1988	Diesel	NCDOT
EMD F59PHI		1755, 1797, 1871, 1984	4	1998	Diesel	NCDOT
EMD F59PHI		2001–2009	8	1994	Diesel	Caltrans
EMD F59PHI		2010–2015	3	2001	Diesel	Caltrans
Siemens Charger SC-44		1400–1401, 1403–1408	8	2016	Diesel	WSDOT
Siemens Charger SC-44		2101–2124	24	2016	Diesel	Caltrans
Siemens Charger SC-44		4601–4633	33	2016	Diesel	IDOT
Non-revenue/switcher locomotives
EMD SW1		787 (Note: Renumbered from 737 in January 2024. The number 737 is now used by a GP38-3.)	1	1941	Diesel	Amtrak
EMD SW1000R		794, 796	2	1952	Diesel	Amtrak
EMD MP15DC		530–539	8	1970	Diesel	Amtrak
EMD SW1500		541	1	1970	Diesel	Amtrak
EMD GP38H-3		520–527	8	1966–68 (Note: Originally built as GMD GP40TC locomotives for GO Transit. They were acquired by Amtrak in 1988, and rebuilt to GP38H-3 locomotives in 2005 by the Altoona Works)	Diesel	Amtrak
EMD GP38-3		720–724	5	1976	Diesel	Amtrak
EMD GP38-3		725–754	30	1960s/70s (Note: Upgraded to GP38-3 standards by Progress Rail 2022–2025)	Diesel	Amtrak
MPI GP15D		570–579	10	2004	Diesel	Amtrak
MPI MP14B		590	1	2010	Diesel genset	Amtrak
MPI MP14B		592, 593	2	2013	Diesel genset	Amtrak
MPI MP21B		591	1	2010	Diesel genset	Amtrak
NRE 2GS12B		599	5	2014	Diesel genset	Amtrak
NRE 2GS12B		597	5	2015	Diesel genset	Amtrak
NRE 2GS12B		792, 793	5	2018	Diesel genset	Amtrak
NRE 2GS12B		798	5	2020	Diesel genset	Amtrak
NRE 2GS12B		790, 791	5	2026	Diesel genset	Amtrak

=== Railcars ===
As of late 2026, Amtrak rostered 1,957 passenger cars of various types. These include coaches, lounges, dining cars, sleeping cars, baggage cars and crew/dormitory cars.

Model	Thumbnail	Road numbers	In service	Year built	Owner
Ex-Metroliner cab car		9632–9651	15	1967–1970 (Note: Originally built as Budd Metroliner electric multiple units; converted to control cars from 1987 to 1988)	Amtrak
Amfleet I		43346–48196, 81500–82999	447	1975	Amtrak
Amfleet II		25000–28024	136	1981	Amtrak
Superliner I		31000–38034	228	1979	Amtrak
Superliner II		32070–39046	175	1993	Amtrak
Horizon		53501–58108	4	1988	Amtrak
Viewliner (prototype)		8400	1	1987	Amtrak
Viewliner I		62000–62049	45	1995	Amtrak
Viewliner II		61000–69009	122	2015	Amtrak
Surfliner		6300–6908	47	2000	Amtrak
Ex-F40PH NPCU		90200–90413	14	1977–1981 (Note: Originally built as EMD F40PH locomotives; converted into Non-Powered Control Units (NPCUs) from 1996 to 2007, except for Amtrak 406, which was converted in 2011. 406 would later be renumbered to 90406 in 2023 to avoid duplicate numbering with the ALC-42 locomotives.)	Amtrak
HHP-8C NPCU		9750–9752	3	1999 (Note: 9750 was originally built as HHP-8 #661, renumbered 691 upon retirement. Converted between 2021 and 2023.)	Amtrak
P42C NPCU		9700–9717	10 (18)	1996–2001 (Note: 9700 was originally built as Amtrak 184, a GE P42DC. It was converted into a P42C in 2024, and it will be the first of 20 P42Cs.)	Amtrak
Autorack		9200–9279	77	2005	Amtrak
State-owned cars
California Car		8001–8814	65	1996	Caltrans
Surfliner		6351–6965	21	2002	Caltrans
Comet IB		5001–5014	14	1968 (Note: Originally built for Penn Central Transportation Company and NJDOT as Arrow I electric multiple units. They were converted to Comet IB locomotive-hauled coaches by Morrison–Knudsen from 1987 to 1988, for use by NJ Transit Rail Operations. These cars were purchased by Caltrans in 2008, and after a second rebuild, entered service on the San Joaquins in 2013.)	Caltrans
North Carolina Fleet		400001–400205	20	1952–1965	NCDOT
Ex-F40PH NPCU		90252–90253, 90340	3	1977, 1980 (Note: Originally built for Amtrak as EMD F40PH locomotives; converted to Non-Powered Control Units (NPCUs) in the late-1990s and early-2000s. They were purchased by the Oregon Department of Transportation in 2009, and leased to Amtrak for use on the Amtrak Cascades.)	ODOT
Ex-F59PH NPCU		101–105	5	1988–1990 (Note: Originally built for GO Transit rail services as EMD F59PH locomotives; now owned by the North Carolina Department of Transportation, they were converted to Cab Control Units (CCU) in 2019 for use on the Piedmont.)	NCDOT
Siemens Venture		4001–4022, (Note: Single coaches with a traditional gangway at each end. All 20 of the original batch of coaches are in service, with an additional 2 Wisconsin-bought unit, 4021 and 4022, being scheduled to enter service on the Hiawatha in mid-2026.) 4101–4136, (Note: Married pairs, with a coach attached to a cafe car or a business class car. All 34 of the original batch of units delivered, with an additional 2 Wisconsin-bought unit, 4035 and 4036, being scheduled to enter service on the Hiawatha in mid-2026.) 4201–4219, (Note: Married pairs, with a coach attached to a combined coach/business class car. All 17 units from the original batch are in service, with an additional 2 Wisconsin-bought unit, 4018 and 4019, being scheduled to enter service on the Hiawatha in mid-2026.) 4301–4317 (Note: Married pairs, with a coach attached to a lounge/cafe car. 1 unit delivered, but not yet in service.), 4501–4503 (Note: Three Wisconsin-bought cab cars scheduled to enter service on the Hiawatha in mid-2026)	88 (97)	2022	IDOT

=== Trainsets and multiple units ===
Model	Sets in service	Thumbnail	Road numbers	Year introduced	Notes	Owner
Acela Express	5		2000–2039	2000	2 electric power cars per trainset.	Amtrak
Acela Express	5		3200–3559	2000	6 unpowered cars per trainset.	Amtrak
Talgo Series 8	2		7110–7911	2013	13 unpowered cars per trainset.	ODOT
Avelia Liberty	16 (28)		2100–2155	2025	2 electric power cars per trainset; 9 unpowered cars per trainset. Branded as NextGen Acela.	Amtrak
Avelia Liberty	16 (28)		3250–3927	2025	2 electric power cars per trainset; 9 unpowered cars per trainset. Branded as NextGen Acela.	Amtrak
Siemens Venture	7		9001–9814	2023	Seven-car unpowered trainsets, includes a cab car, hauled by diesel-electric locomotives.	Caltrans
Amtrak Airo	7 (8)		7001–7077, 7900 series, 71001–79361	2026	Six-car trainsets including a cab car. 5 sets are unpowered and paired with a SC-44 locomotive. 2 sets are paired with ALC-42E locomotives.	Amtrak
Amtrak Airo	(26)		7001–7077, 7900 series, 71001–79361	(2028)	Six-car trainsets including a cab car and an APV.	Amtrak
Amtrak Airo	(32)		7001–7077, 7900 series, 71001–79361	(2027)	Eight-car trainsets including a cab car and an APV.	Amtrak
Amtrak Airo	(8)		7001–7077, 7900 series, 71001–79361	(2031)	Ten-car trainsets hauled by two refurbished ACS-64s.	Amtrak
Amtrak Airo	(17)		7001–7077, 7900 series, 71001–79361	(2029)	Six-car trainsets including a cab car and a battery car.	Amtrak
FLIRT	10			(2027)	Not yet in service. Hydrogen multiple units for use on the Gold Runner.	

=== Business cars ===
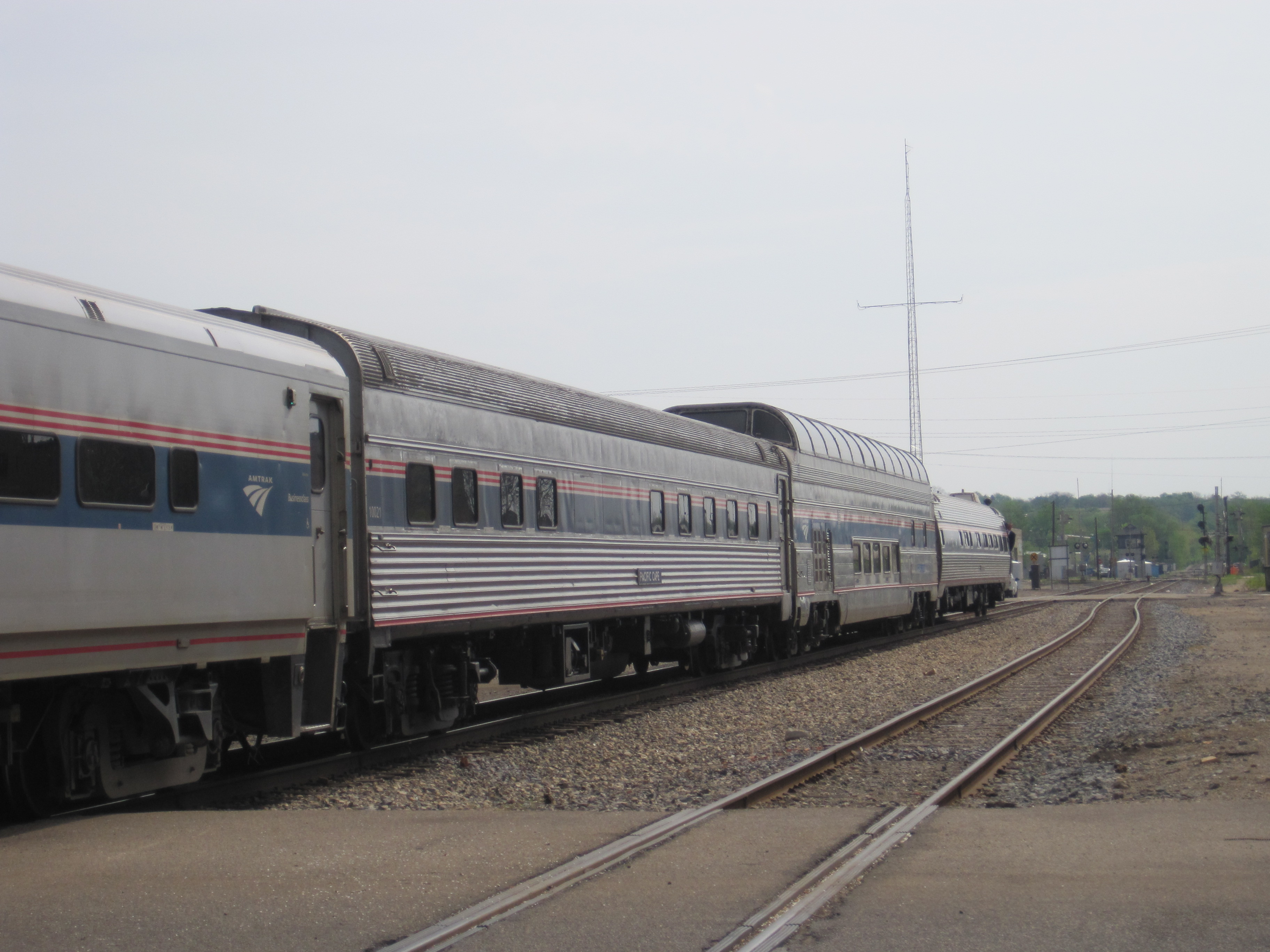
Three of Amtrak's business cars on the back of the Blue Water in 2011: the Pacific Cape, Ocean View, and Beech Grove

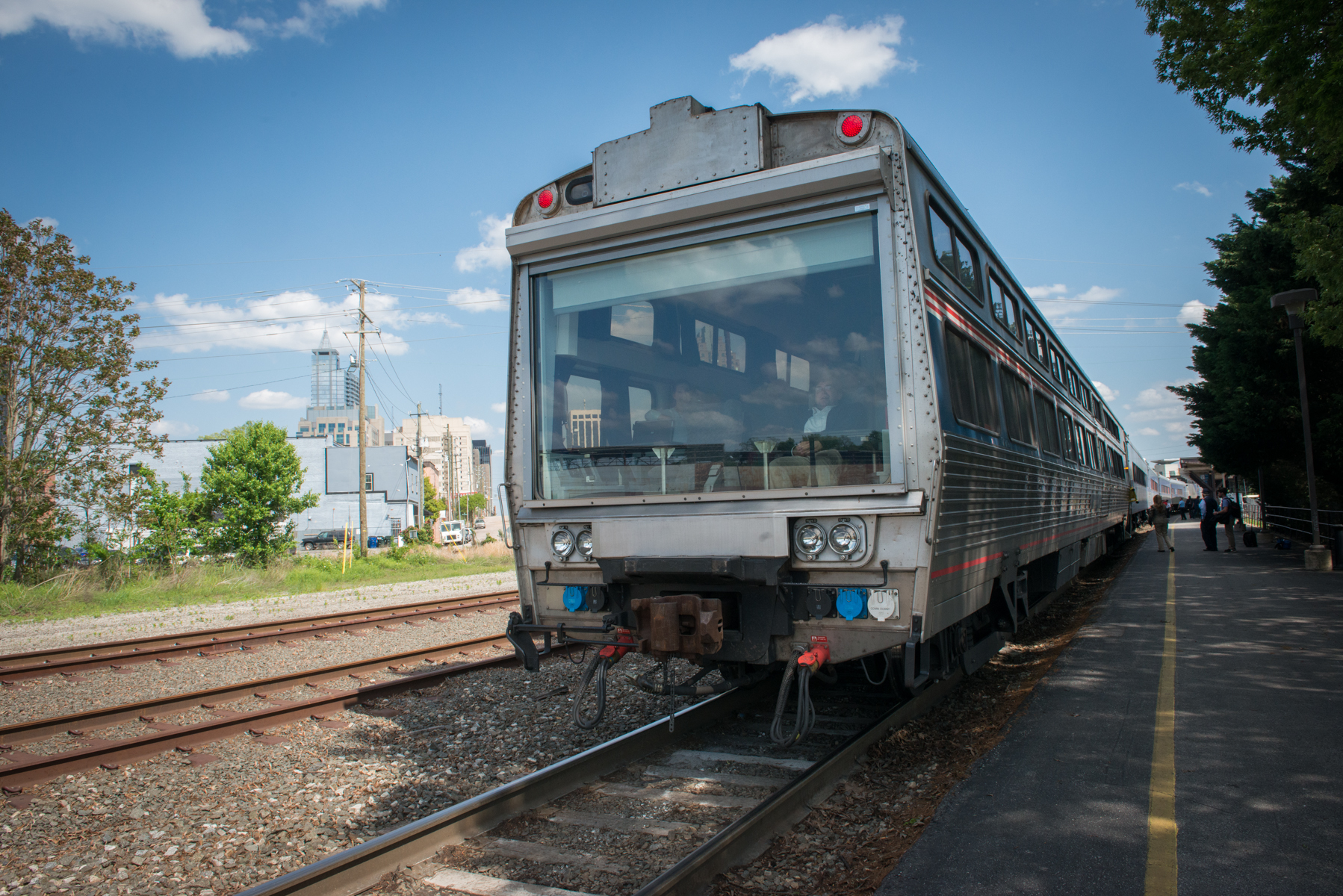
Amtrak's American View business and inspection car

In addition to its regular fleet, Amtrak owns several business and track geometry cars:

- #9800 Metroliner, a former Metroliner electric multiple unit cafe converted to be used as a first-class conference car. Primarily used on charter services on the Northeast Corridor. The car is broken up into three areas, one end of the car has 12 business class seats in a 2+1 configuration, the middle has a cafe, and the other end has conference areas (a large private conference room with eight seats around a large table, two medium-sized semi-private conference sections with four seats around a table and two small semi-private conference sections with two seats around a table). At one time, the car had cab controls that have since been removed.
- #10001 Beech Grove, an "Amfleet office car" used for official business by the Amtrak president and other VIPs. This unique car has an open observation platform, lounge seating area, dining room, kitchen and two sleeping accommodations, as well as lights, GPS equipment and a camera to inspect tracks for defects. The car was repurposed in 2020 with a LiDAR Laser Measurement System.
- #10002 Corridor Clipper, an Amfleet I-based track geometry car. It is periodically attached to the end of a diesel or electric revenue-running train or is hauled by a locomotive only. The car previously had a special pantograph that was used to test and measure overhead lines.
- #10003, an Acela-based track geometry car. It is periodically inserted into an Acela Express consist between a power car (locomotive) and the nearest end car, resulting in a train with two power cars and seven intermediate cars rather than the normal six.
- #10004 American View, a Viewliner-based "inspection car" with rear-facing seats and large glass window at the end of the car that allows passengers to observe the tracks. The car can also be used by maintenance crews to visually inspect the tracks for defects and by the Amtrak president and other executives for official purposes. Originally numbered #2301, the American View is one of the three prototype Viewliner cars and was the last passenger railcar produced by Budd.
- #10005, a catenary measurement car. Like car #10002 Corridor Clipper, this car has a special pantograph that is used to test and measure overhead lines.
- #10006 Corridor View, a Viewliner based track geometry car. Like other Amtrak business cars, the car was attached to the end of a diesel or electric revenue-running train or is hauled by a locomotive only. Originally numbered #2300, the Corridor View is one of the three prototype Viewliner cars and was refurbished in November 2025, receiving its Phase VII paint scheme.
- #10020 Pacific Bend, a heritage Pacific-series 10-6 sleeper formerly owned by Union Pacific, now converted for Amtrak crew use on special trains. Four roomettes remain for staff use, five roomettes have been converted to storage areas and one has been converted into a shower. The bedrooms have been removed and replaced with a crew lounge.
- #10021 Pacific Cape, a heritage Pacific-series 10-6 sleeper now converted for crew use on special trains. It is usually used along with the Beech Grove for official business by the Amtrak president and other VIPs.

== Former (Amtrak purchased) ==
This is a partial listing of locomotives and rolling stock formerly operated by Amtrak. This does not include equipment inherited from private railroads (see below).

=== Locomotives ===
Builder	Model	Thumbnail	Road numbers	Years of service	Power type
Road power
EMD	SDP40F		500–649	1973–1987	Diesel
GE	P30CH		700–724	1975–1991	Diesel
EMD	F40PH		200–229; 410–415 (Note: 410–415 ex-GO Transit)	1976–2003	Diesel
EMD	F40PHR		230–409	1977–2003	Diesel
EMD/Siemens	F69PHAC		450–451	1989–1993	Diesel
GE	E60		600–610, 620, 621, 950–975	1974–2003	Electric
Bombardier/Alstom	HHP-8		650–664 (Note: Renumbered to 680-694 upon retirement)	1999–2014	Electric
EMD/ASEA	AEM-7		900–953	1978–2016	Electric
EMD	F59PHI		450–470	1998–2019	Diesel
GE	P40DC		800–843	1993–2025	Diesel
Switchers
ALCO	RS-1		44, 46, 47, 59, 62		Diesel
ALCO	RS-3		100–144		Diesel
ALCO	S-2		746		Diesel
EMD	SW1		730–745	1976	Diesel
EMD	SSB1200		550–567	1984–2008	Diesel
EMD	CF7		575–599	1984–2003	Diesel
EMD	GP7		760–762, 769, 771–784		Diesel
EMD	GP9		763–768, 770		Diesel
EMD	GP40		650–664	1991–1993	Diesel
EMD	SW8		1, 3, 747–750		Diesel
GE	45t		7		Diesel
GE	65t		5, 6		Diesel
Railpower	GG20B		599	2006–2008	Diesel
GE	80t		1100	–2025 (Note: Ex-US Army; sold to Hudson Terminal Rail Services in Denver in 2025.)	Diesel

=== Trainsets ===
Builder	Model	Image	Road numbers	Years of service	Power type	Notes
ANF	Turboliner		58–69	1973–1995	Gas turbine	Semi-permanently coupled trainset.
Rohr	Turboliner		150–163	1976–2002	Gas turbine	Semi-permanently coupled trainset.
Bombardier	LRC		38, 39 (power cars)	1980–1982	Diesel	Leased by Amtrak, returned to Bombardier.
Talgo	Series VI		7100–7905 (52 cars)	1998–2020	Unpowered (locomotive-hauled)	Five 13-car trainsets for Amtrak Cascades, Two trainsets (Mt. Hood and Mt. Olympus) owned by Amtrak, three (Mt. Adams, Mt. Baker and Mt. Rainier) owned by WSDOT. Mt. Adams trainset destroyed in 2017 Washington train derailment, others retired on recommendation of the NTSB.

=== Passenger cars ===
Builder	Model	Thumbnail	Road numbers	Year built	Notes
Pullman	Gallery Car		9600–9624	1958	Ex-CNW, acquired by Amtrak in 1974. Retired in the 1990s. Several units sold to Florida Fun Train in the 1990s, and now on the Alaska Railroad as Ultra Domes.

=== Express cars ===
Amtrak has fielded four different types of specialized cars to support its mail and express business. These included material handling cars (MHCs), roadrailers, express boxcars, and ExpressTrak refrigerator cars. Although express cars are traditionally called "head end" cars; the MHC express boxcars were the only cars equipped with lines for head end power, allowing them to be located between the locomotive and passenger cars. All others were found on the rear of the train, behind the last passenger car. Most of the fleet was retired in 2003 when Amtrak exited the express business, save for parcels carried in baggage cars.

Builder	Model	Thumbnail	Road numbers	Years of service	Notes
Thrall Car Company	Material Handling Cars (MHC)		1400–1479, 1500–1569	1986–2003	
Pacific Car and Foundry	Express Boxcars		70000–70049	1997–2003	Built 1976, ex-SP
Trenton Works	Express Boxcars		71000–71199	1999–2003	
Trinity Industries	Express Boxcars		71200–71299	2001–2003	
	ExpressTrak		74000–74109	2000–2006	Refrigerator cars, rebuilt from existing boxcars

== Former (inherited) ==
=== Locomotives ===
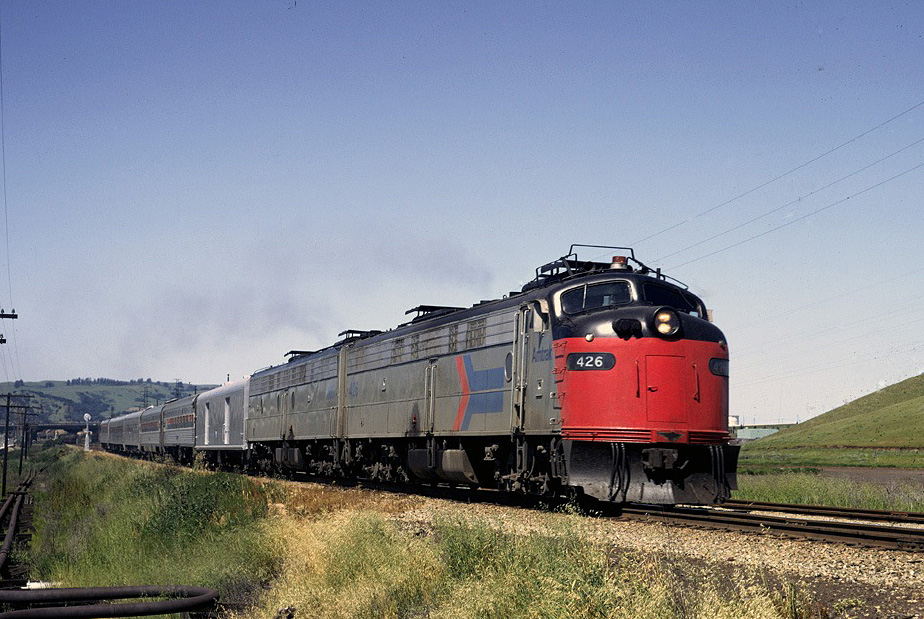
EMD E9 "A" and "B" units with the San Joaquin in 1974

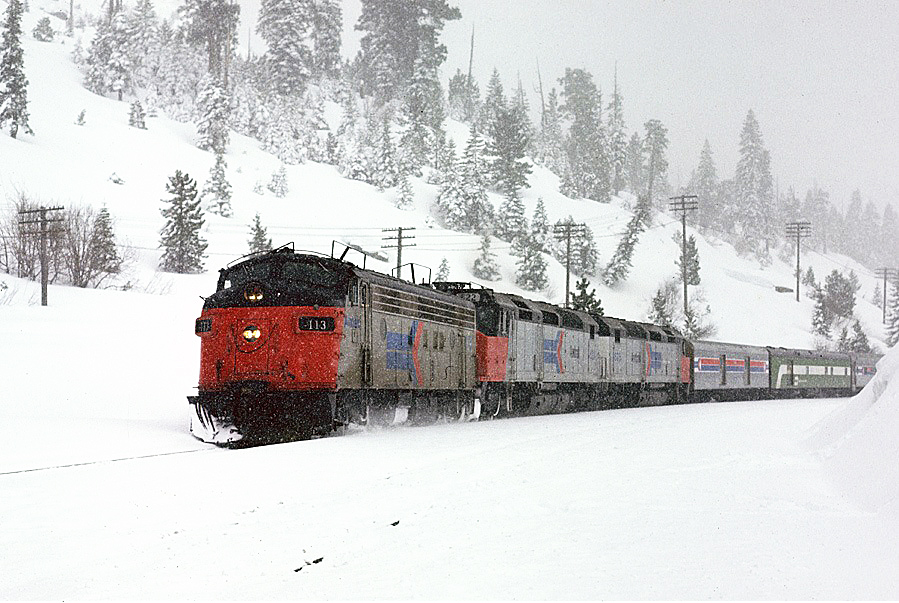
An EMD FP7 leading the San Francisco Zephyr in 1975

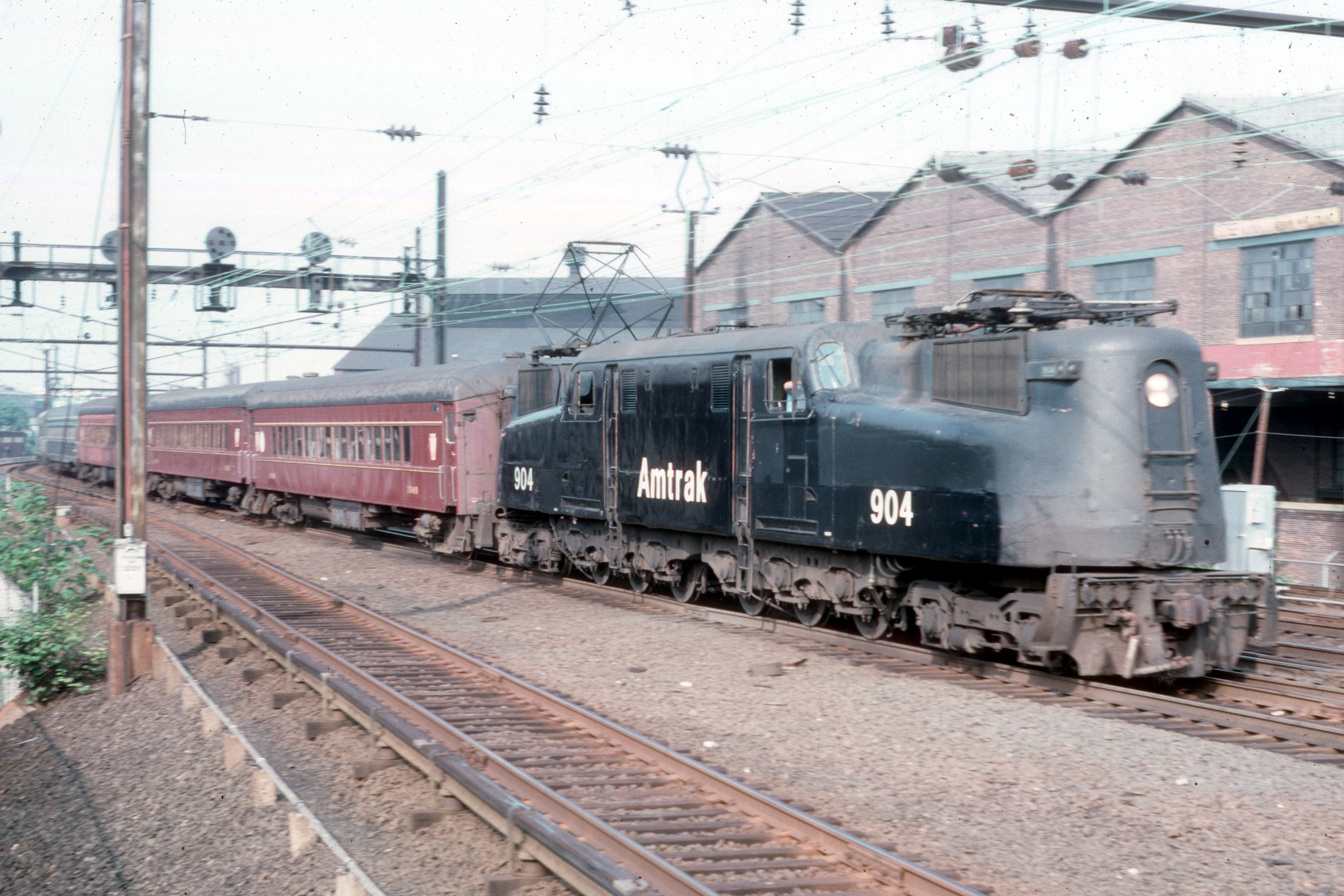
GG1 #904 westbound at Harrison, New Jersey in June 1975

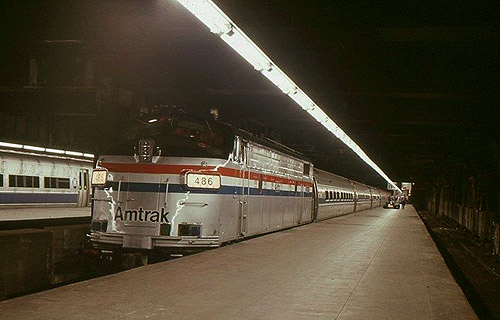
An EMD FL9 #486 at Grand Central Terminal in 1991

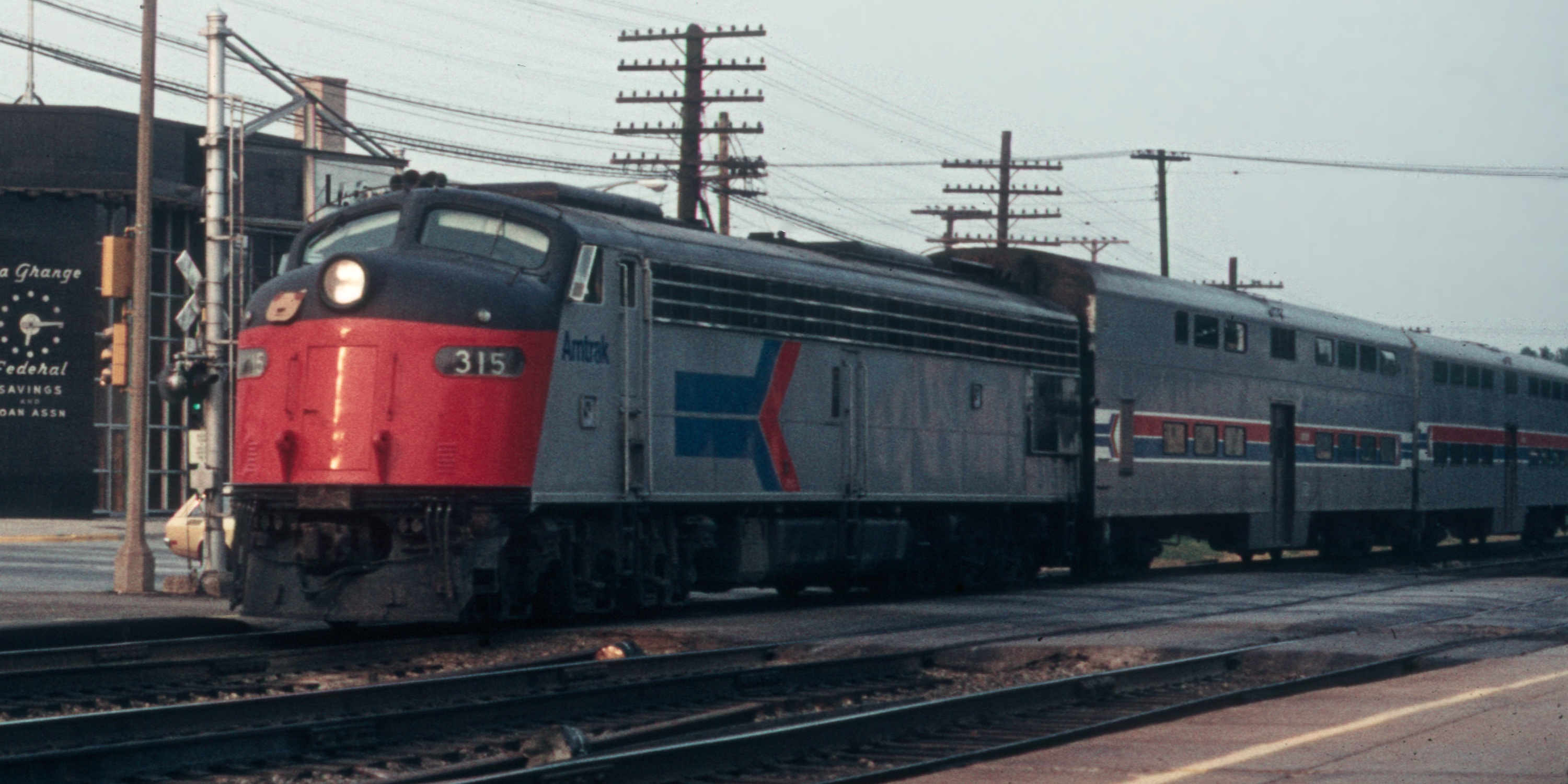
EMD E8A #315 leading the Illinois Zephyr in 1975

Amtrak inherited numerous locomotives from private railroads on its formation in 1971. Most of these were retired by the end of the decade, if not earlier. These locomotives are enumerated below, with their original owners.

Builder	Model	Road numbers	Years of service	Notes
EMD	F3A			Ex-BN, NP
EMD	F3B	155–156	1971–1975	Ex-BN, NP
EMD	F3B	660–665	1971–1975	Ex-BN
EMD	F7A	100–107	1971–c. 1977	Ex-BN, NP
EMD	F7B	150–151	1971–c. 1977	Ex-BN, GN
EMD	F7B	152–154	1971–c. 1977	Ex-BN, NP
EMD	F7B	160–164	1971–c. 1977	Ex-SP
EMD	FP7A	110–123	1971–c. 1975	Ex-SP
EMD	E8A	200–210	1971–c. 1979	Ex-BO
EMD	E8A	211–212	1971–c. 1979	Ex-BO, CO
EMD	E8A	213–223	1971–c. 1979	Ex-RFP
EMD	E8A	224–225	1971–c. 1979	Ex-LN
EMD	E8A	226–227	1971–c. 1979	Ex-LN, SLSF
EMD	E8A	230–231	1971–c. 1979	Ex-SCL, FWD
EMD	E8A	232–237	1971–c. 1979	Ex-SCL, ACL
EMD	E8A	238–245	1971–c. 1979	Ex-SCL, ACL, MKT
EMD	E8A	246–254	1971–c. 1979	Ex-SCL, SAL
EMD	E8A	255–276	1971–c. 1979	Ex-PC, NYC, PRR
EMD	E8A	277–324	1971–c. 1979	Ex-PC, PCC
EMD	E8A	325–331	1971–c. 1979	Ex-UP
EMD	E8A	332–352	1971–c. 1979	Ex-BN, CBQ
EMD	E8A	436	1971–c. 1979	Ex-IC
EMD	E8B	370–374	1971–c. 1979	Ex-UP
EMD	E9A	400–403	1971–1980	Ex-BO
EMD	E9A	404	1971–1980	Ex-SCL, SAL
EMD	E9A	405–410, 434–435	1971–1980	Ex-MILW
EMD	E9A	411–433	1971–1980	Ex-UP
EMD	E9B	446, 453–470	1971–1980	Ex-UP
EMD	E9B	450–452, 471–472	1971–1980	Ex-MILW
EMD	FL9	231–242 (Note: Later renumbered 480-491.)	1971–c. 1996	Dual-mode. Ex-PC, CR, NH
GE	E44	500–507	1987–1991 (Note: These units were acquired from NJ Transit in 1987, with the intention of using them for Northeast Corridor maintenance of way trains. However, these units never entered service, and were officially retired in 1991, when the GE Dash 8-32BWHs used the 500 series. One unit, ex-Amtrak 502, is now at the Railroad Museum of Pennsylvania, restored to its original appearance as PRR 4465.)	Ex-NJT, Ex-PC, PRR
GE	GG1	900–929	1971–1980	Ex-PC, PRR

=== Trainsets and multiple units ===
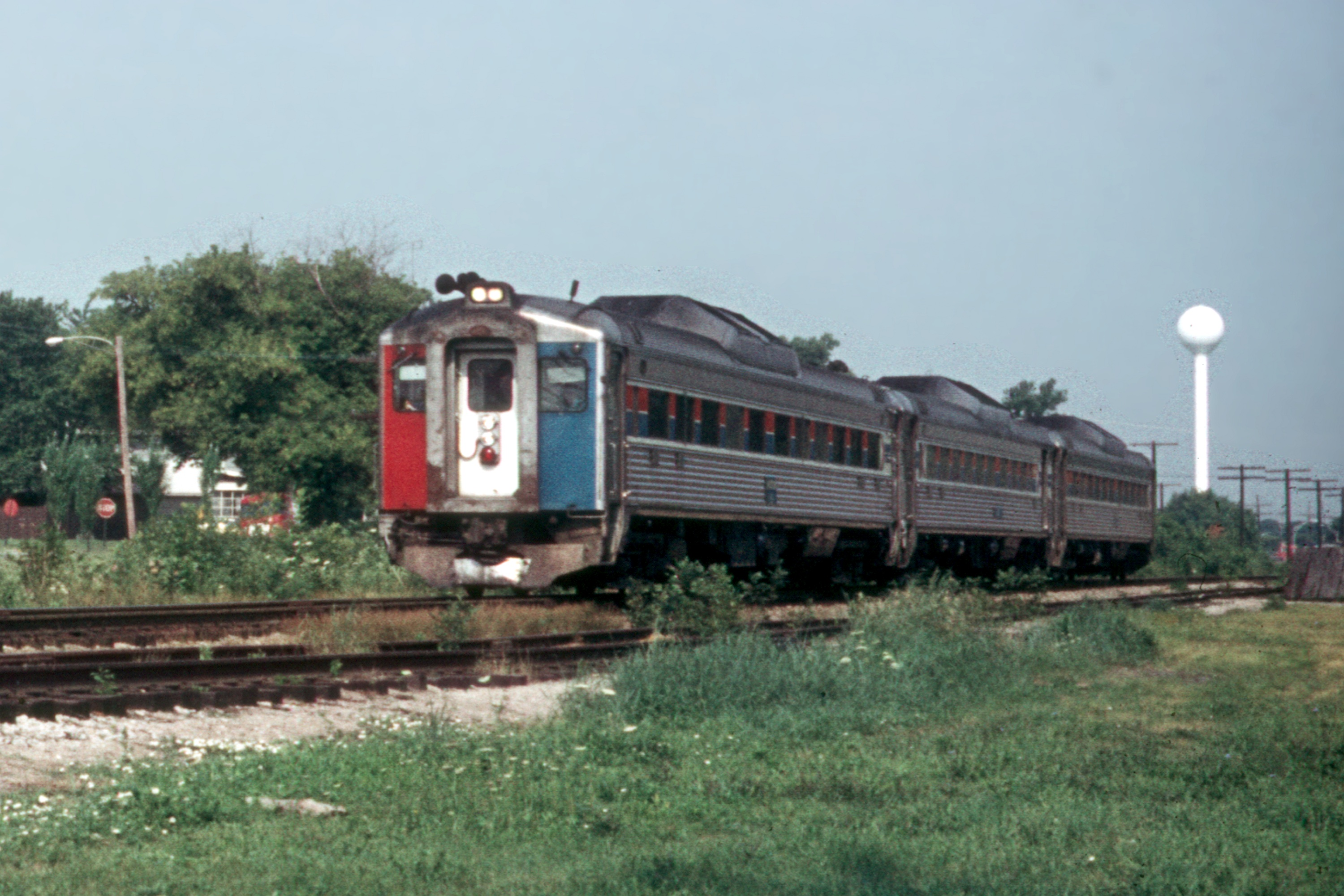
Budd RDC #15 on a Black Hawk service in 1975

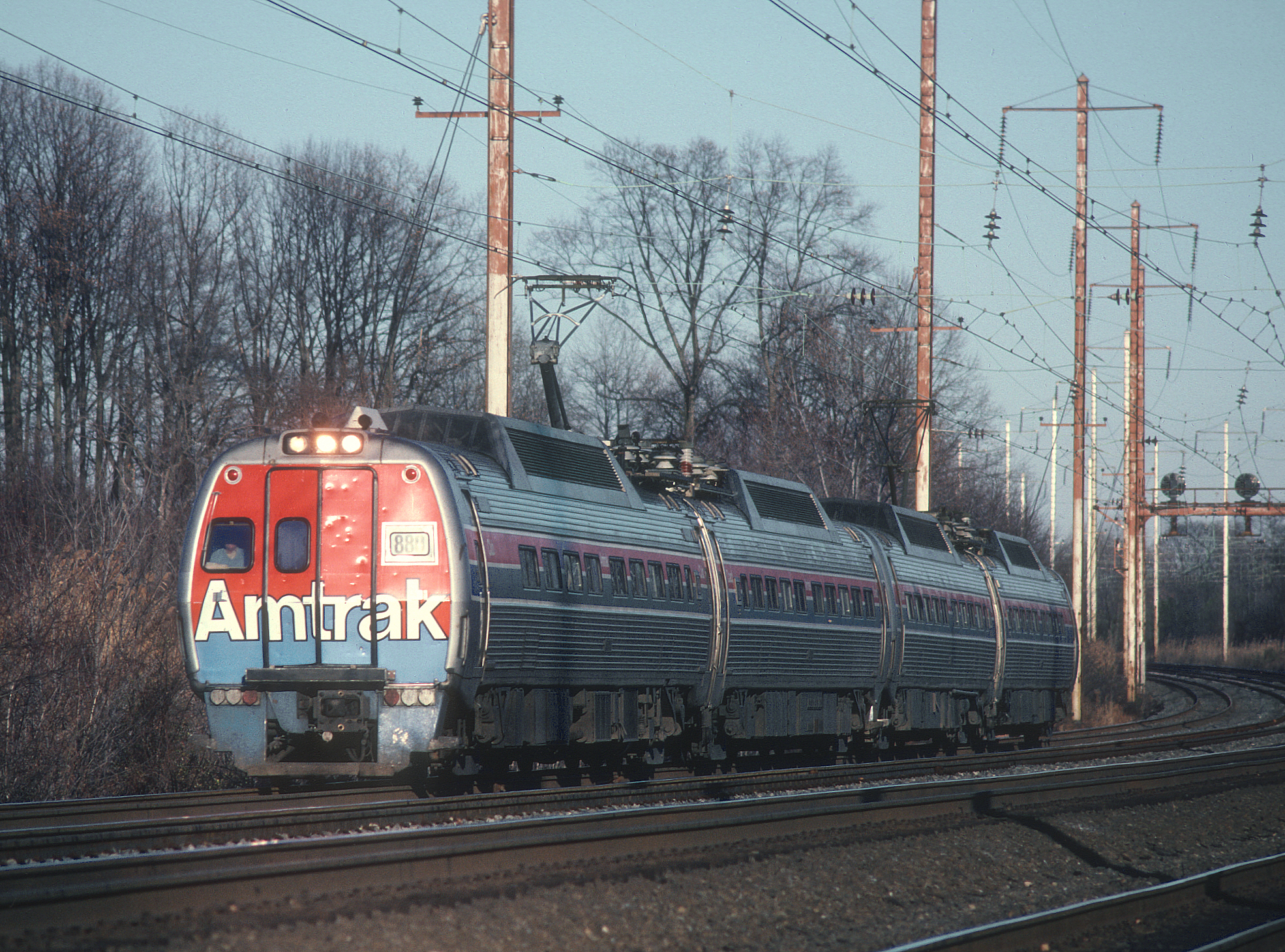
Budd Metroliner car #880 leading a Metroliner service in 1980

Builder	Model	Road numbers	Original owner	Years of service	Notes
UAC	TurboTrain	50–53	USDOT via NYC, PC	1971–1976	Gas turbine trainset.
Budd	RDC	10–20, 27–29, 36	NH via PC		Diesel multiple unit
Budd	RDC	30–32, 40–42	Ex-BN, NP		Diesel multiple unit
Budd	RDC	34	Ex-PC, NYC		Diesel multiple unit
Budd	RDC	43	Ex-BN, GN		Diesel multiple unit
Budd	Metroliner	800–830, 850–869, 880–889	PC	1971–1988	Electric multiple unit. 860 preserved. Many remain active as de-motored cab cars.

=== Passenger cars ===
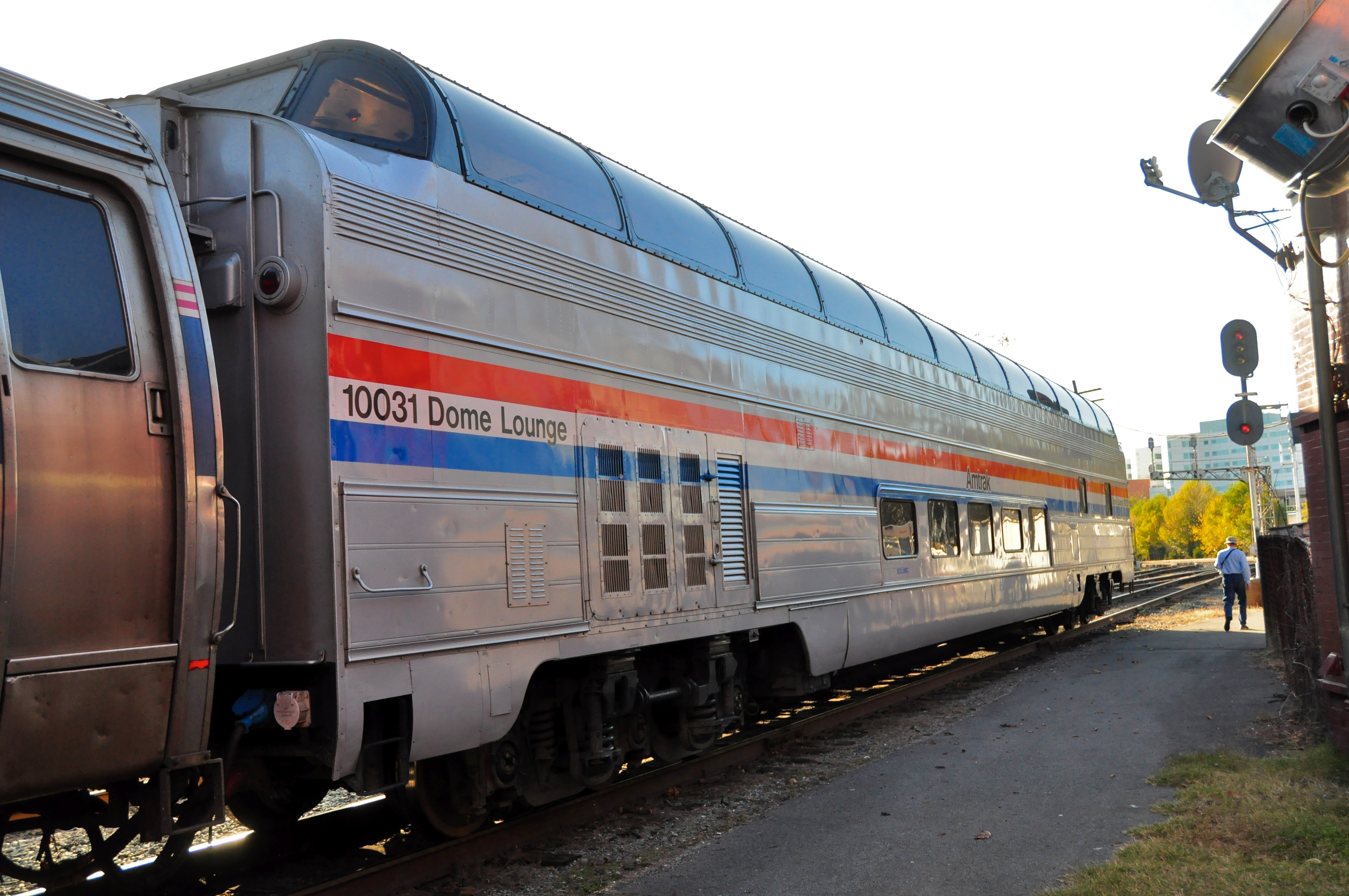
The Ocean View, Amtrak's former dome car, on the Cardinal in 2011

Builder	Model	Road numbers	Years of service
Various	Baggage cars	1000 series	1971–2017
Budd Company / American Car & Foundry; Pullman Standard / St Louis Car Company	Sleeping cars	2000 series	1971–2007
Budd Company / American Car & Foundry; Pullman Standard / St Louis Car Company	Lounge cars	3000 series	1971–2000
Budd Company / American Car & Foundry; Pullman Standard / St Louis Car Company	Coach cars	4000–7000 series	1971–2002
Budd Company / American Car & Foundry; Pullman Standard / St Louis Car Company	Dining cars	8000 series	1971–2017
Budd Company / American Car & Foundry; Pullman Standard	Dome cars	9000 series	1971–2019
Budd Company	Hi-Level cars	9000 series 39000 series	1971–2018

=== Generator cars ===
In its early years, Amtrak also rostered some generator cars rebuilt from older locomotives and rolling stock.

Original builder	Model (as built)	Type (on Amtrak)	Road numbers	Years of service	Notes
EMD	E8A	Steam generator car	672–676		Ex-Amtrak, (Note: Converted from locomotives used by Amtrak) PC, PRR
ACF	Baggage car	Head-end power car	693–696	Mid-late 1970s	Ex-PC, NYC
St. Louis	Kitchen car	Head-end power car	1300, 1304–1307 (Note: Later renumbered to 1290–1295, then to 685–689)	Mid-late 1970s	Ex-US Army
PS	Coach	Head-end power car	1297–1299 (Note: Later renumbered to 690–692)	Mid-late 1970s	Ex-UP
EMD	F3B	Steam generator car	1910–1915 (Note: Later renumbered 660–665)	1971–1975	Ex-BN, NP
EMD	E9B	Steam generator car	1916–1921 (Note: Later renumbered 666–671)		Ex-Amtrak, ex-UP

== See also ==
- Amtrak paint schemes
- Budd SPV-2000, Connecticut-owned diesel multiple units which Amtrak operated in the 1980s–1990s
