= MPI MP20B =

Type and origin
- Power type: Diesel-electric
- Builder: MotivePower
- Model: MP20B
- Build date: 2007-2008
- Total produced: 21
Specifications
- Configuration
  - UIC: B-B
- Gauge: 4 ft 8 1/2 in (1,435 mm)
- Length: 59 ft 2 in (18.03 m)
- Loco weight: 277,000 lb (126,000 kg)
- Prime mover: MTU-Detroit Diesel 12V4000; Caterpillar 3516C
Performance figures
- Maximum speed: 70 mph (113 km/h)
- Power output: 2,000 hp (1,490 kW)
- Tractive effort: 85,000 lbf (380 kN) starting 55,000 lbf (240 kN) continuous

The MPI MP20B is a diesel-electric locomotive designed and built by MotivePower in Boise, Idaho.

== Specifications ==
The MP20 has a 2,000 hp (1,490 kW) MTU-Detroit Diesel 12V4000 engine. It weighs approximately 277,000 lb and is 59 ft 2 in long. It has a maximum speed of 70 mph (113 km/h). It also includes a B-B wheel arrangement and an optional dynamic brake. It includes a continuous tractive effort of 55,000 lbf (240,000 N) and a starting tractive effort of 85,000 lbf (380,000 N).

Union Pacific MP20Bs were powered by a Caterpillar 3516C.

== Owners ==
Owner	Built	Quantity	Notes
Pacific Harbor Line	2008	2	Rebuilt from EMD GP40 and EMD GP38
New Jersey Transit	2007-2008	5	Rebuilt from EMD GP40FH-2s
Union Pacific	2008	13	Rebuilt from EMD GP50s
