= MPI MP14B =

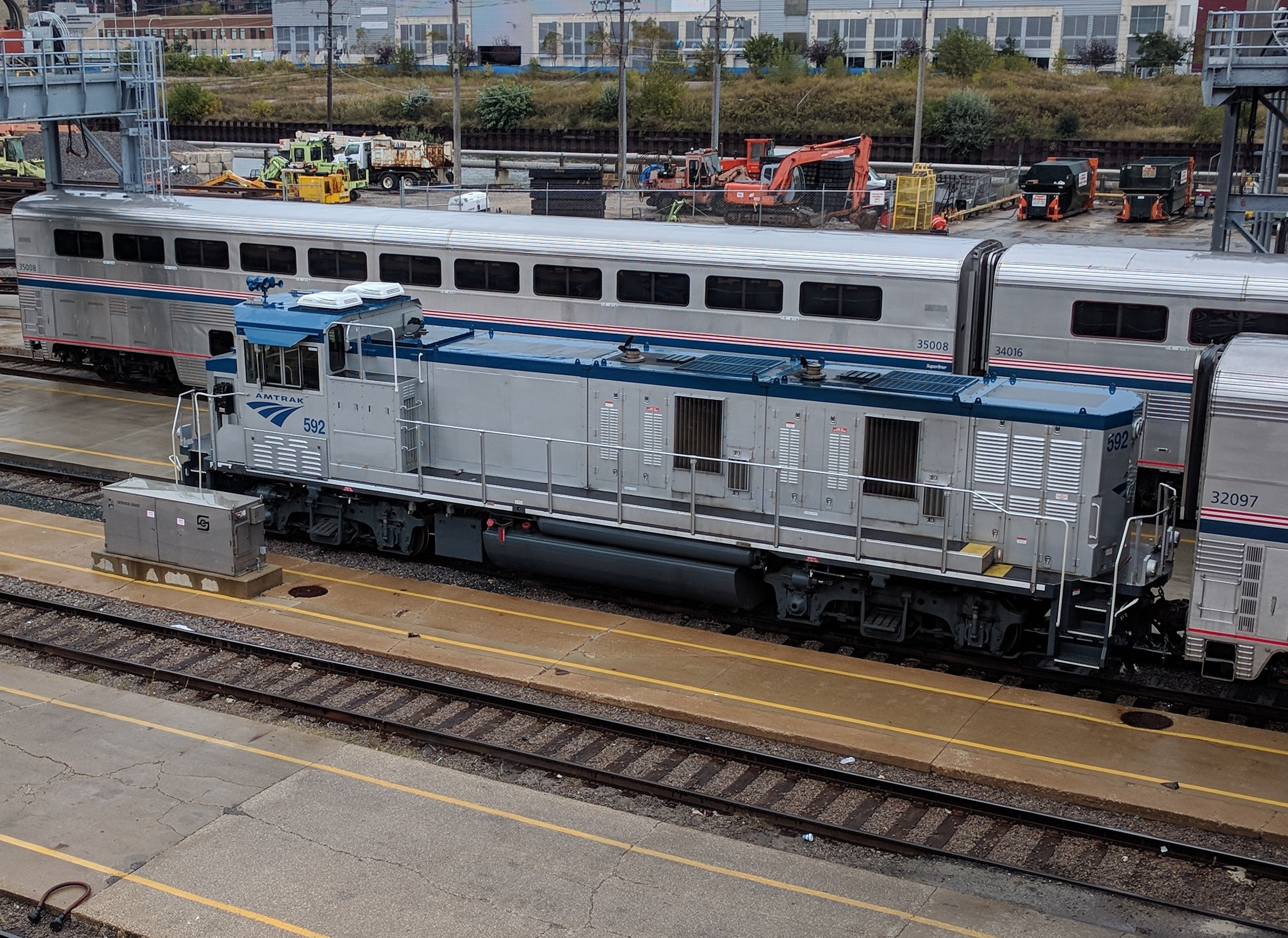
- Amtrak #592, one of 7 units produced, in 2018
Type and origin
- Power type: Diesel-electric
- Builder: MotivePower
- Model: MP14B
- Build date: 2008
- Total produced: 7
Specifications
- Gauge: 4 ft 8 1/2 in (1,435 mm) standard gauge
- Prime mover: Cummins QSK19C (×2)
- Engine type: Straight-six engine
- Aspiration: Turbocharger
- Cylinders: I6 (×2)
Performance figures
- Power output: 1,400 hp (1,040 kW)
Career
- Operators: Amtrak

The MPI MP14B is a low-emissions diesel switcher locomotive built by MotivePower. It is powered by two Cummins QSK19C I6 engines with each one developing 700 horsepower (522 kW) and creating a total power output of 1,400 horsepower (1,040 kW).

The MPI MP14B is nearly identical to the MPI MP21B except that it has one fewer engine.

== See also ==
- Genset locomotive
