= MPI MP20C =

Type and origin
- Power type: Diesel-electric
- Builder: MotivePower
- Model: MP20C
- Build date: 2007
- Total produced: 14
Specifications
- Configuration
  - UIC: Co-Co
- Gauge: 4 ft 8 1/2 in (1,435 mm)
- Length: 68 ft 2 in (20.78 m)
- Loco weight: 390,000 lb (180,000 kg)
- Prime mover: MTU-Detroit Diesel 12V4000
Performance figures
- Maximum speed: 70 mph (110 km/h)
- Power output: 2,000 hp (1,490 kW)
- Tractive effort: 128,000 lbf (570 kN) starting 82,000 lbf (360 kN)
Career
- Operators: Pacific Harbor Line

The MPI MP20C is a switcher diesel locomotive designed and built by MotivePower in Boise, Idaho.

== Specifications ==
It has a 2,000 hp (1,490 kW) MTU-Detroit Diesel 12V4000 engine. It weighs approximately 390,000 lb and is 68 ft 2 in (20.78 m) long. It has a maximum speed of 70 mph (110 km/h). It also includes a C-C wheel arrangement and an optional dynamic brake. It includes a continuous tractive effort of 82,000 lbf (360 kN) and a starting tractive effort of 128,000 lbf (570 kN). It is built on an EMD SD40 frame.

== Owners ==
Owner	Built	Quantity	Notes
Pacific Harbor Line	2007-2009	14	Rebuilt from EMD SD45s and EMD SD40s
