= EMD GP40-based passenger locomotives =

Passenger diesel locomotive class

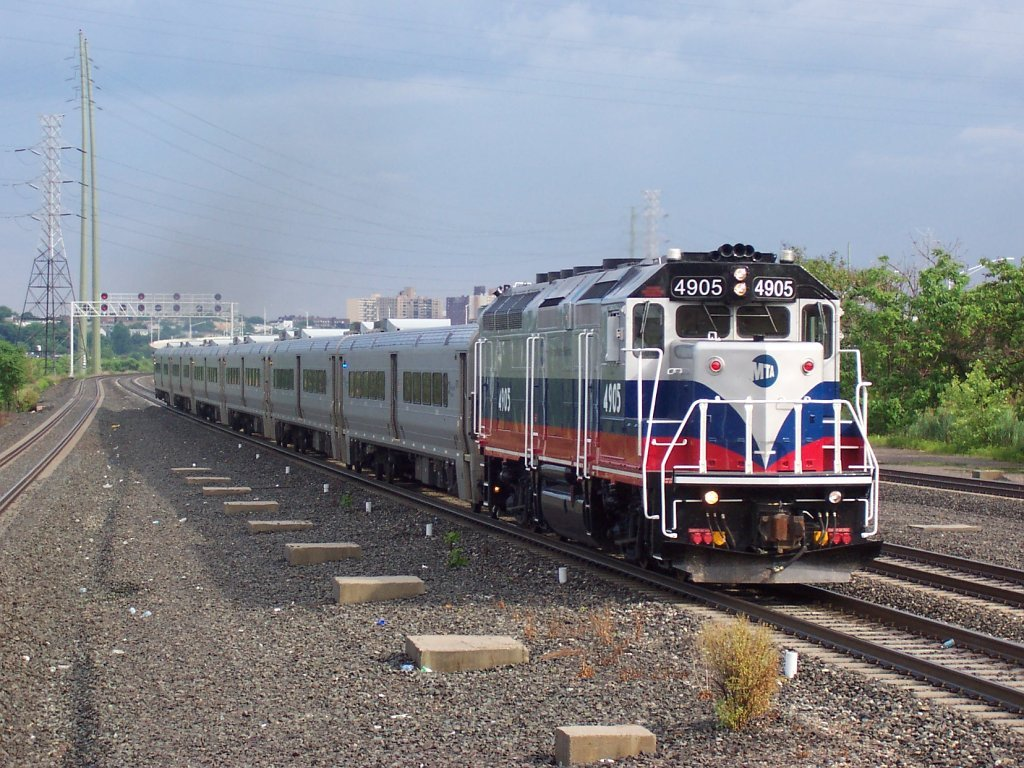
- A Metro-North Railroad GP40FH-2 locomotive entering Secaucus Junction
Type and origin
- Power type: Diesel-electric
- Builder: Electro-Motive Diesel (EMD)
Specifications
- Configuration
  - AAR: B-B
  - UIC: Bo'Bo'
  - Commonwealth: Bo-Bo
- Gauge: 4 ft 8 1/2 in (1,435 mm) standard gauge
Performance figures
- Maximum speed: 77–105 mph (124–169 km/h)
- Power output: 2,000–3,000 hp (1,491–2,237 kW)
Career
- Locale: North America

Passenger locomotives derived from the EMD GP40 diesel-electric locomotive have been, and continue to be, used by multiple passenger railroads in North America. For passenger service, the locomotives required extra components for providing steam or head-end power (HEP) for heating, lighting and electricity in passenger cars. Most of these passenger locomotives were rebuilt from older freight locomotives, while some were built as brand new models.

== GP40TC ==
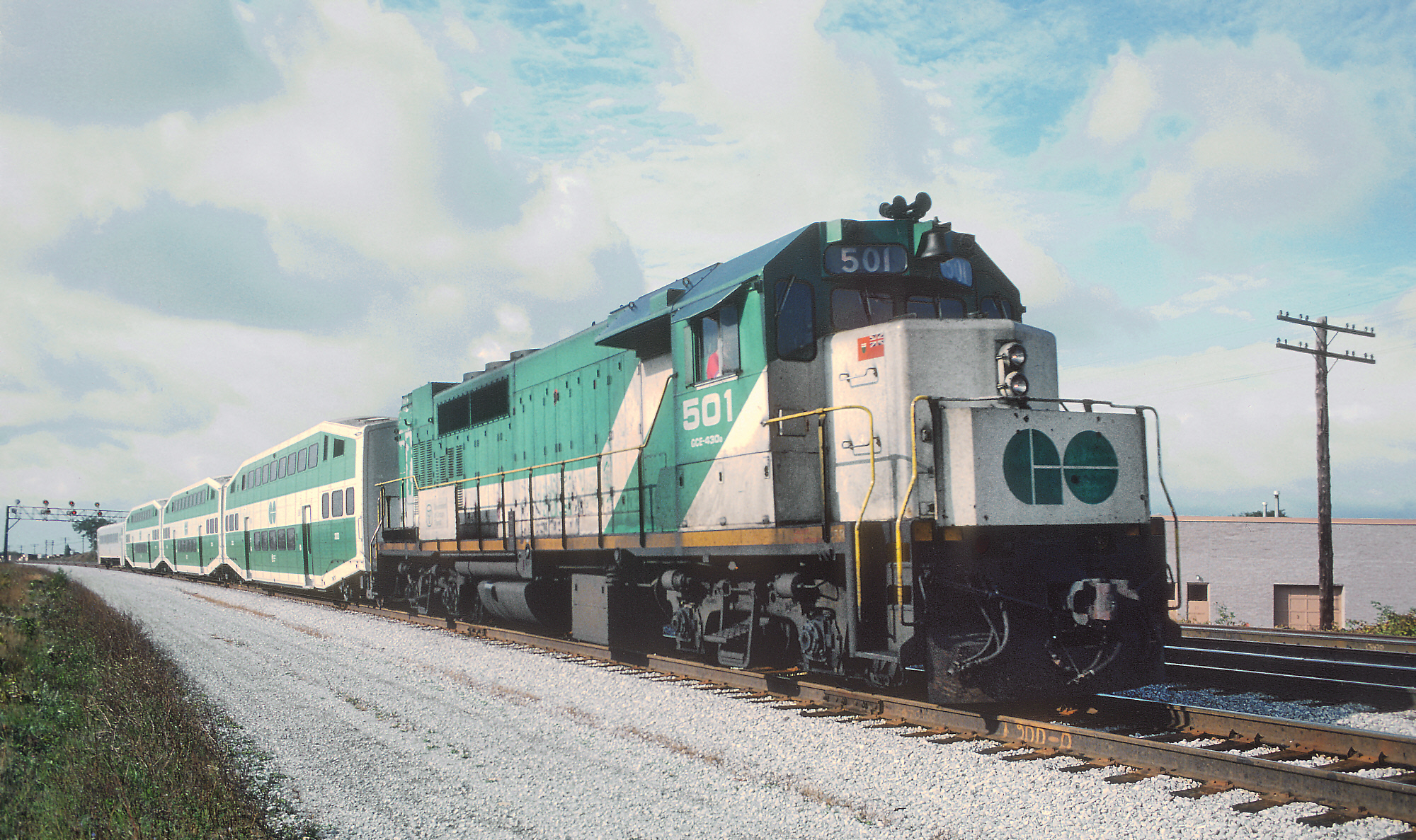
GO Transit GP40TC No. 501 with Bombardier Bi-Level Coaches in October 1980

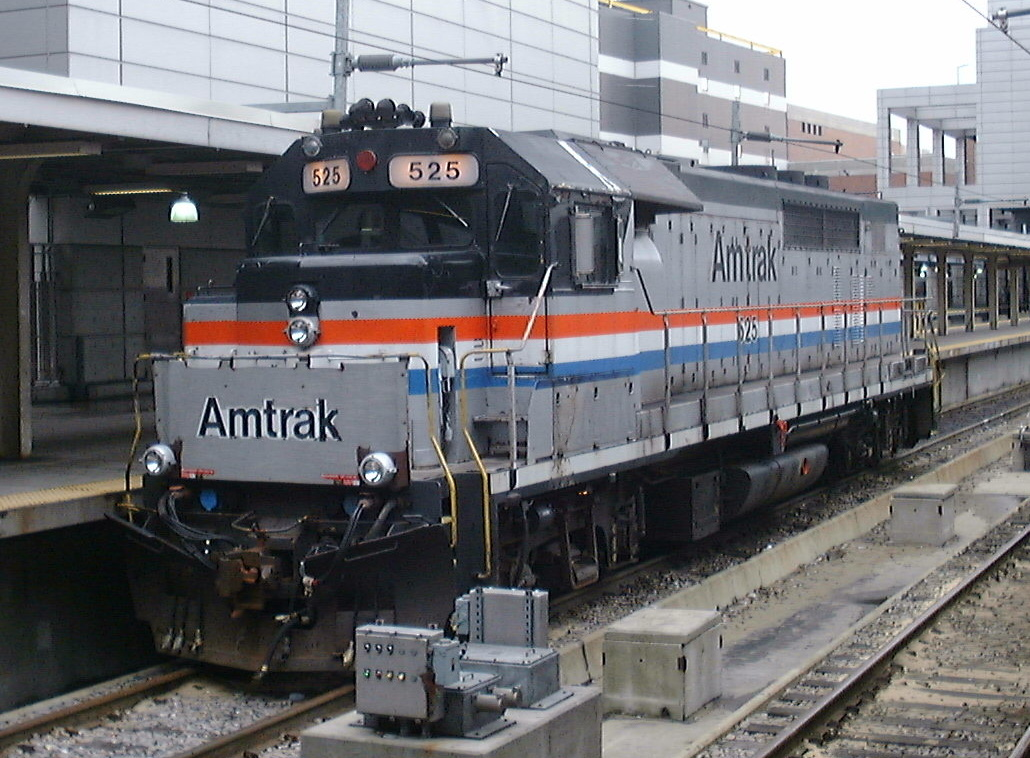
Amtrak GP40TC No.525 at Boston South Station in March 2002

The GMD GP40TC was built by General Motors Diesel (GMD), for GO Transit in Toronto. Eight units were manufactured between 1966 and 1968. They were built on an extended frame to accommodate a head-end power generator. GO Transit sold the fleet to Amtrak in 1988, where they were based in Chicago and used on short-haul trains.

In 2005, the Norfolk Southern Railway rebuilt all eight GP40TC locomotives at its Juniata Shops in Altoona, Pennsylvania. These are now classed as GP38H-3, and work as maintenance-of-way trains or standby power for Downeaster trains.

== GP40P ==
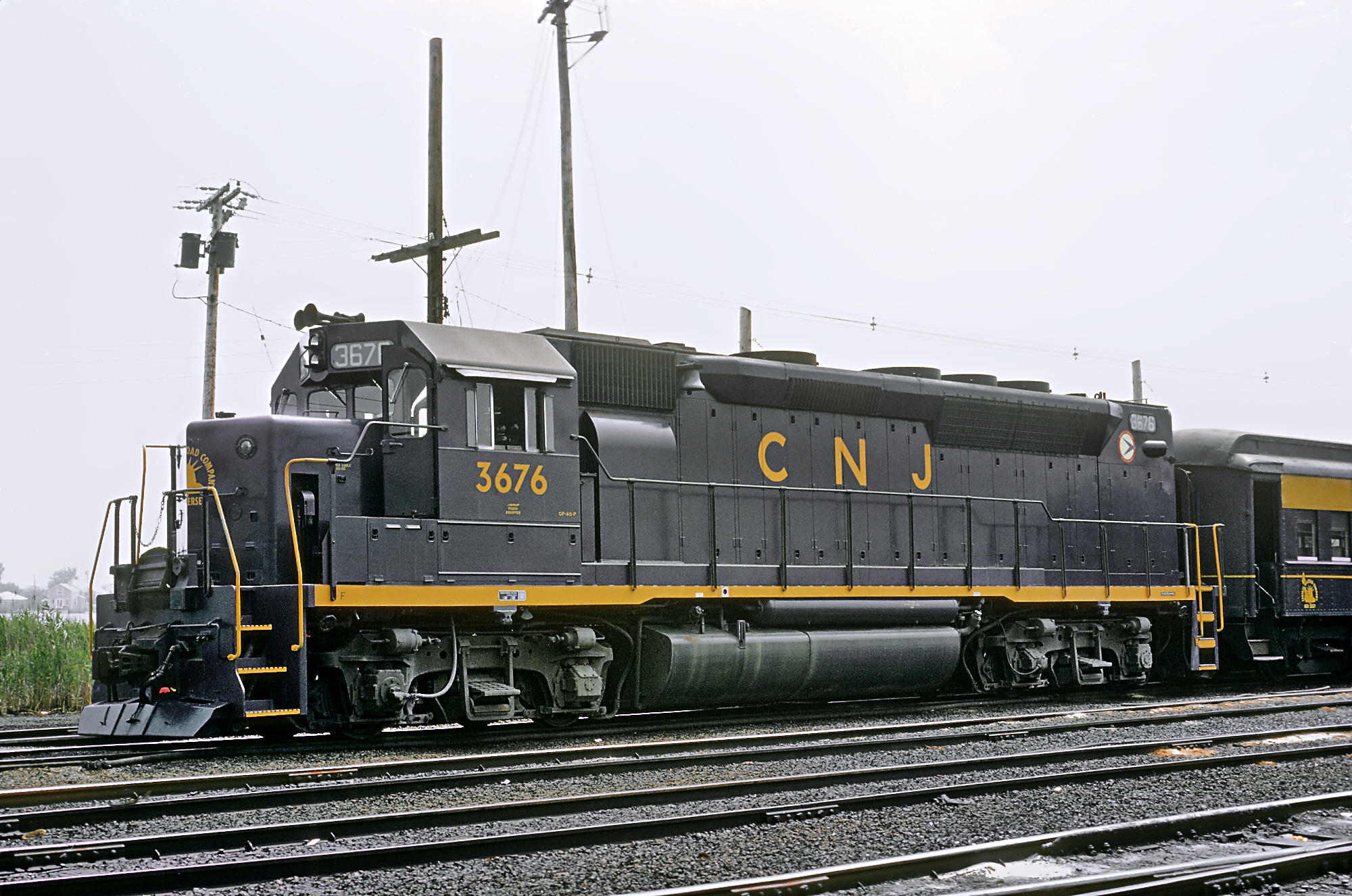
GP40P 3676 operating on the Central Railroad of New Jersey.

Thirteen GP40Ps were built in October 1968 for the Central Railroad of New Jersey (CNJ) and paid for by the New Jersey Department of Transportation (NJDOT). The CNJ put the units in service on the Raritan Valley Line and the North Jersey Coast Line.

The CNJ's passenger operations were transferred to NJDOT in 1976 (with Conrail operating them under contract), and in 1983 NJ Transit assumed operating passenger rail service in the state. Shortly after, the steam generator, which had occupied the flat end of the locomotive's long hood, was replaced with a diesel HEP generator, and the units were reclassified as GP40PH. They were later rebuilt as GP40PH-2 units in 1991–92.

=== GP40P-2 ===
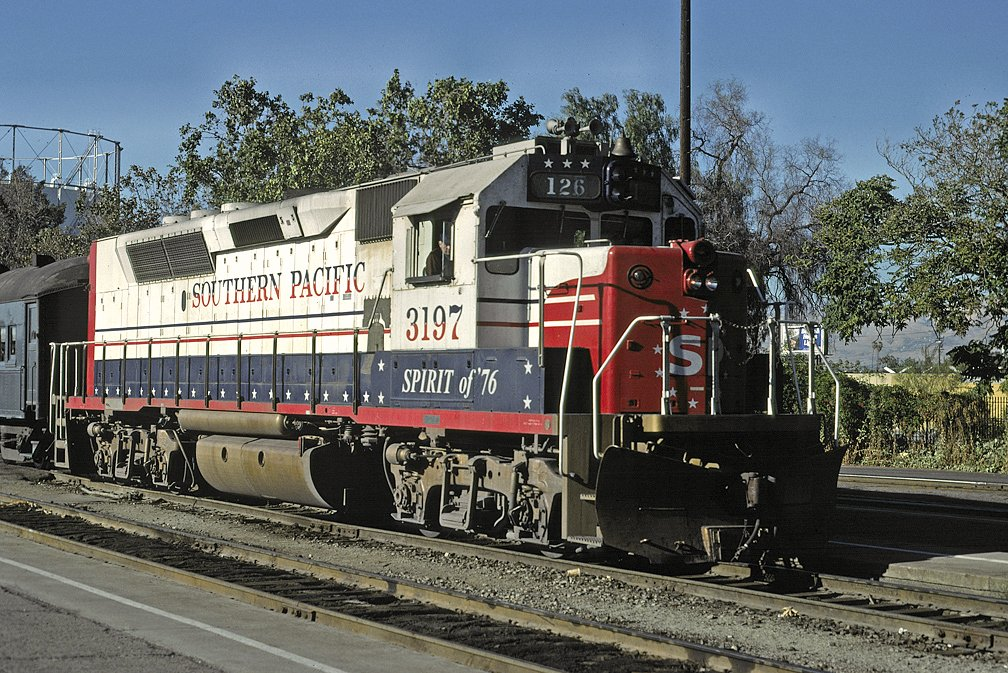
SP GP40P-2 #3197 painted to commemorate the United States Bicentennial. This unit is currently in service as Indiana Harbor Belt Railroad 4010.

The Southern Pacific Railroad ordered a Dash-2 variant of the GP40P; only three of these were ever built, all of which were initially used on the Peninsula Commute. These units were originally numbered 3197-3199. After the conclusion of passenger service, they were repurposed for freight use and renumbered 7600-7602.

Following SP's merger into the Union Pacific Railroad, the GP40P-2s were renumbered to UP 1300, 1373, 1375.

All three units are still in service, with 1373 and 1375 being retained by the Union Pacific Railroad and the remaining one, 1300, being sold to the Indiana Harbor Belt Railroad as IHB 4010.

== GP40FH-2 ==
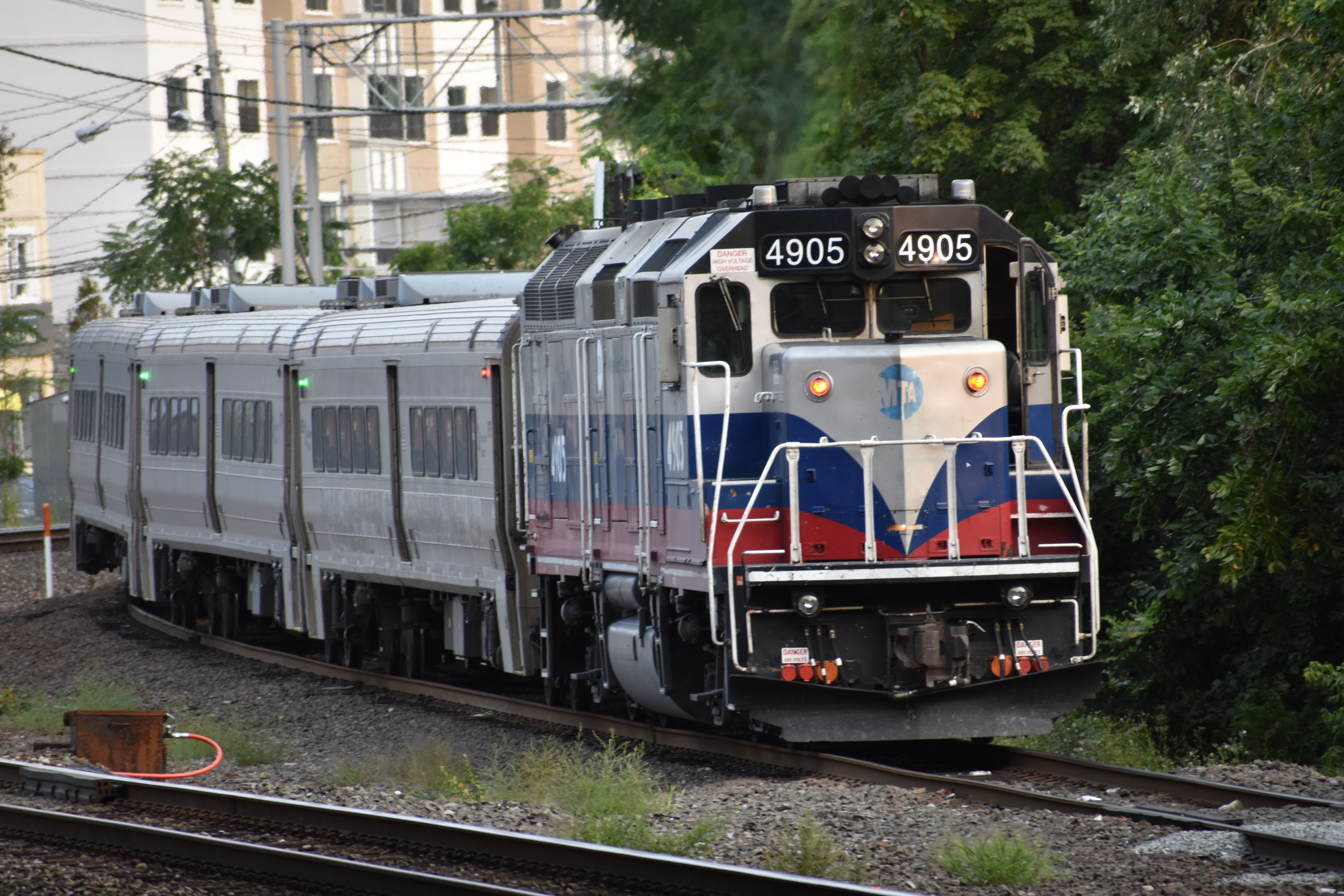
Metro-North Railroad GP40FH-2 No. 4905 at Suffern Yard

In 1987, New Jersey Transit and Metro-North ordered a set of GP40 locomotives called GP40FH-2s, which were completed by Morrison Knudsen between 1987 and 1990. These locomotives combine the standard cab and frame of a GP40 with the cowl from an ex-Burlington Northern F45 locomotive. A total of 21 units of this type were built; 15 were delivered to New Jersey Transit, and the remaining six were for Metro-North.

As of late 2016, only the Metro-North units remain in service, rebuilt as GP40FH-2Ms. All NJT GP40FH-2 locomotives have been retired following the delivery of the ALP-45DP. Five units were rebuilt into MPI MP20B switchers in 2008. Seven NJT units were purchased by Iowa Pacific Holdings and three of those were designated for use on the Hoosier State between Chicago and Indianapolis before Amtrak took over operations again on January 30, 2017. The rest of the units have been sold to various other operators.

== GP40PH-2 ==
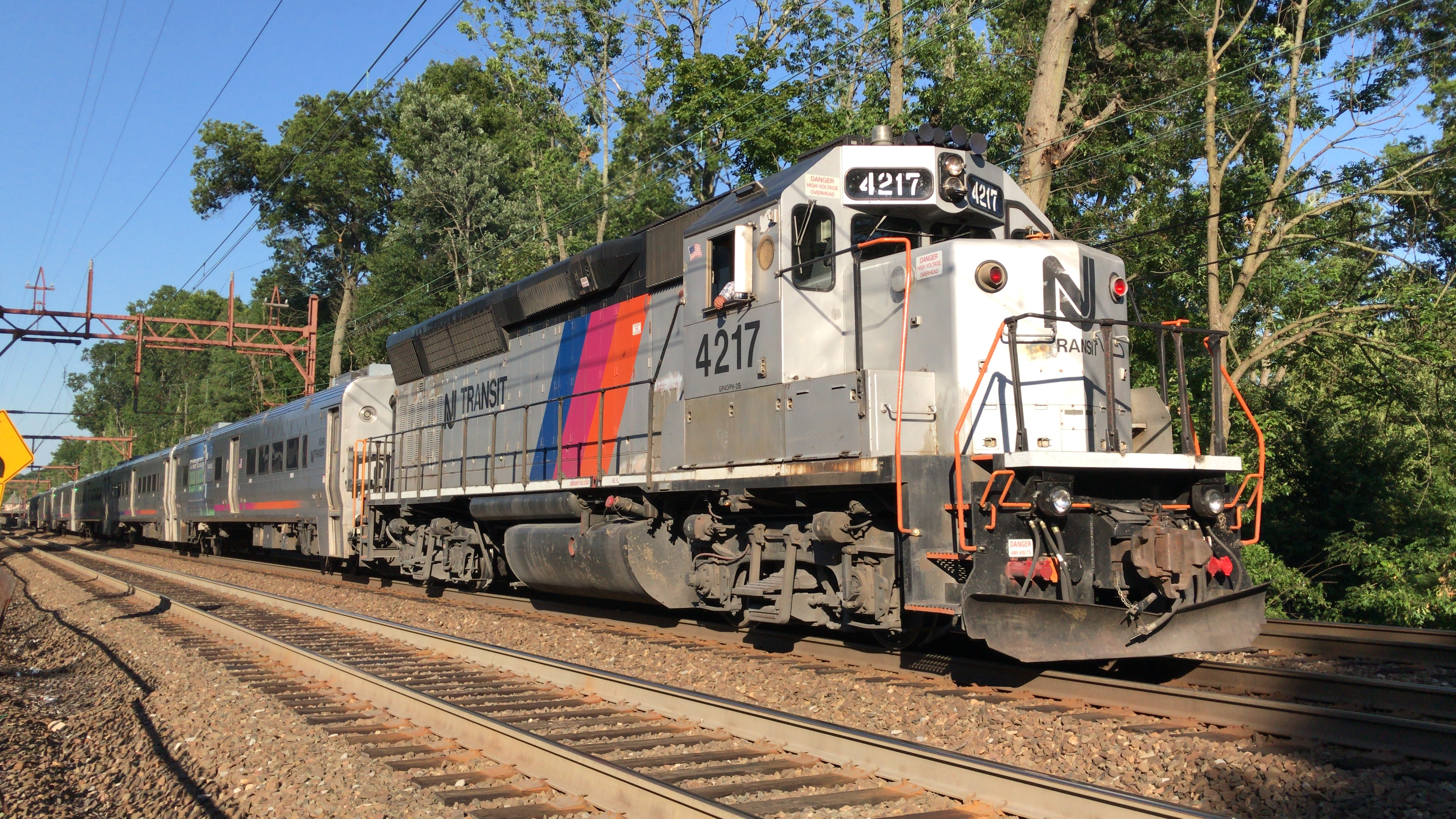
NJ Transit GP40PH-2B No. 4217 heads west out of Maplewood

In 1991–92, NJ Transit sent its ex-CNJ GP40PH units out for rebuilding. The units were rebuilt as GP40PH-2 locomotives.

New Jersey Transit later ordered two more sets of GP40PH-2 units; these units were rebuilt from former freight GP40 units. The first order in 1993 consisted of six units rebuilt by Morrison-Knudsen which are designated GP40PH-2A. The second order in 1993–94 was for 19 former Penn Central units rebuilt by Conrail, which are classified as GP40PH-2B.

Metro-North ordered a single GP40PH-2 unit, numbered 4906. It was rebuilt by Conrail in 1992 and is classified as a GP40PH-2M.

Starting in 2014, all but three of NJ Transit's original GP40PH-2s have entered an in-house rebuild program by NJ Transit for a mechanical conversion into a standard GP40-2 for non-revenue service. The HEP motor was removed, unlit number boards were drilled in, the rear ladders were removed and replaced with steps, and LED markers were applied to the rear end of the locomotive, replacing their original tri-color class lights. As of 2026, locomotives 4100, 4101 and 4109 are the only ex-CNJ locomotives that remain in service, alongside NJ Transit's GP40PH-2Bs and Metro-North's GP40PH-2M. All GP40PH-2A units were retired and scrapped in March 2026, except for one unit, 4145, which was sold to MARC in 2019.

In December 2017, New Jersey Transit purchased 17 additional ALP-45DPs to replace the remaining GP40PH-2B locomotives that are still in service. However, in July 2020, NJ Transit decided to use the ALP-45As to replace older locomotives of the PL42AC fleet instead of the GP40PH-2Bs, due to the PL42AC's unreliability and inability to be upgraded to meet new Environmental Protection Agency standards.

== GP39H-2 ==
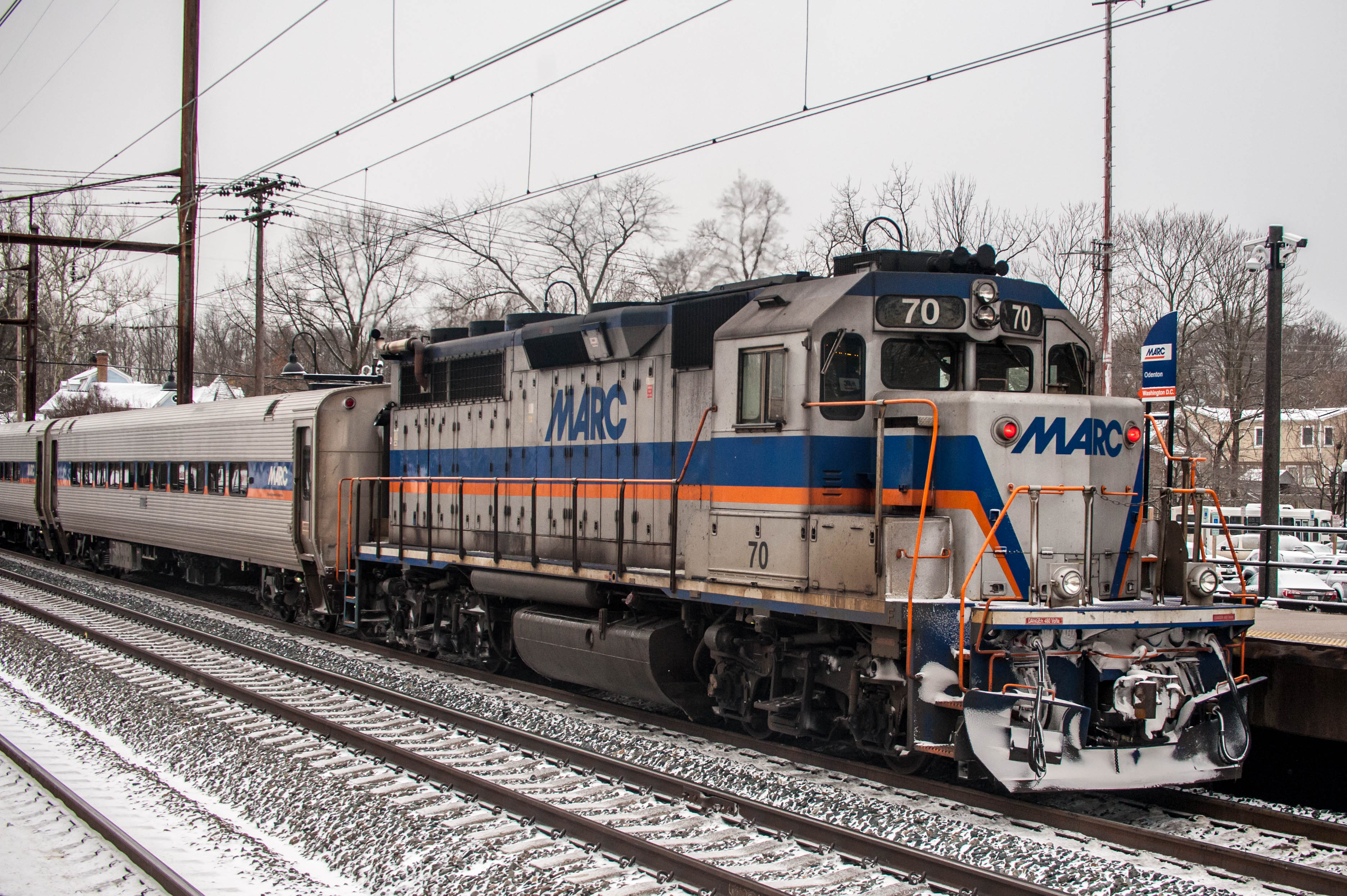
MARC GP39H-2 No. 70 at Odenton

In the late 1980s, Morrison-Knudsen rebuilt six GP40s into 12-cylinder GP39s for MARC. They were downgraded from 3,000 horsepower (2,200 kW) to 2,300 horsepower (1,700 kW), and re-equipped with 4-stroke Cummins HEP generators. As of 2023, all were rebuilt as GP39PH-3Cs, and they continue to be used by MARC for smaller train sets and work train duty.

== GP40WH-2 ==
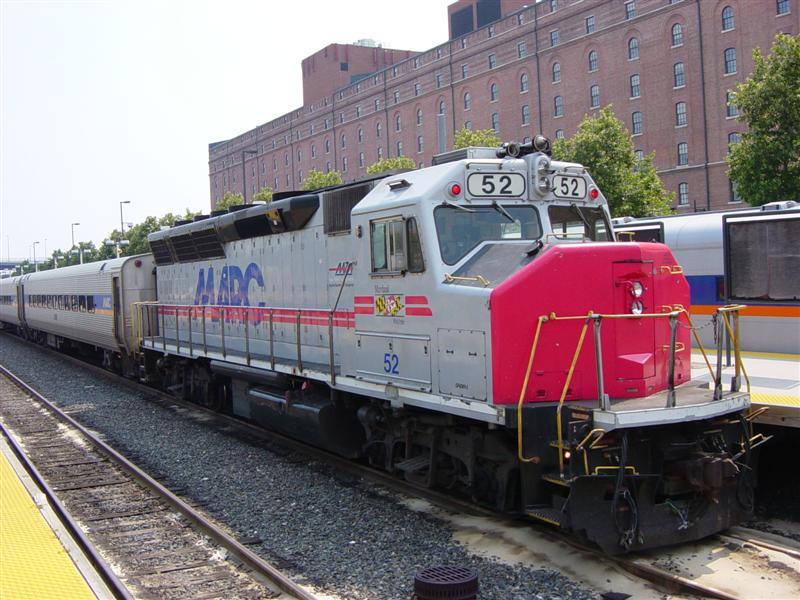
MARC GP40WH-2 No. 52 at Camden Station, Baltimore, Maryland

In 1993, Morrison-Knudsen was contacted by the Maryland Transit Administration to assemble a fleet of GP40s for use on MARC. They entered service in 1994. GP40WH-2s are equipped with a Cummins head-end power generator. The Federal Railroad Administration exempted these units from the "triangular light pattern" rule because the engines were ordered with Gyralites before the mandatory use of ditch lights.

Between 2009 and 2011, MARC retired all of their GP40WH-2 locomotives in favor of new MP36PH-3C locomotives, except for unit 68, which remains for non-revenue work duty and rescue use. Five units were leased to the MBTA in 2011 until 2012, and one unit was sent to CSX Transportation for use on their track geometry train. The remaining units have been rebuilt by MotivePower into MP32PH-Q locomotives for use on SunRail or sold to various leasing firms.

== GP40-2H ==
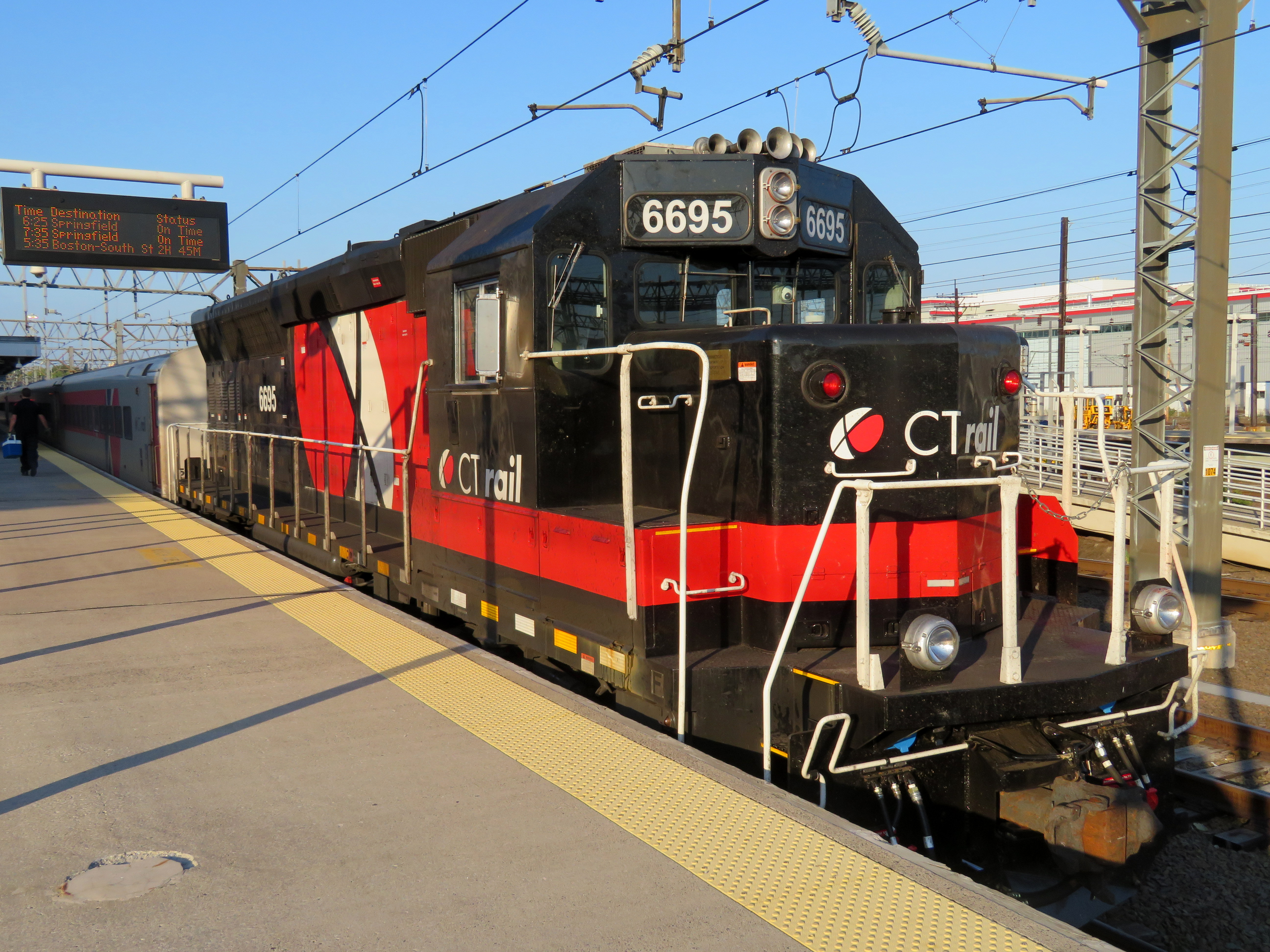
CTrail GP40-3H No. 6695 at New Haven Union Station

In 1996, AMF Technotransport rebuilt six freight locomotives into passenger locomotives for the Connecticut Department of Transportation for use on Shore Line East service. The locomotives, designated GP40-2H, were rebuilt from ex-CSX Transportation EMD GP38s and EMD GP40s. The rebuild included an EMD 645 prime mover, producing 3,000 hp (2,200 kW), and a separate head-end power (HEP) generator.

Between 2017 and 2018, the GP40-2H locomotives received an overhaul performed by National Railway Equipment and were reclassified as GP40-3H. They were subsequently transferred to the newly established Hartford Line service, where they remain in service as of June 2018. In 2022, the remaining Shore Line East equipment was moved into service on the Hartford Line after CTDOT introduced M8 electric multiple units to operate on Shore Line East service.

== GP40MC ==
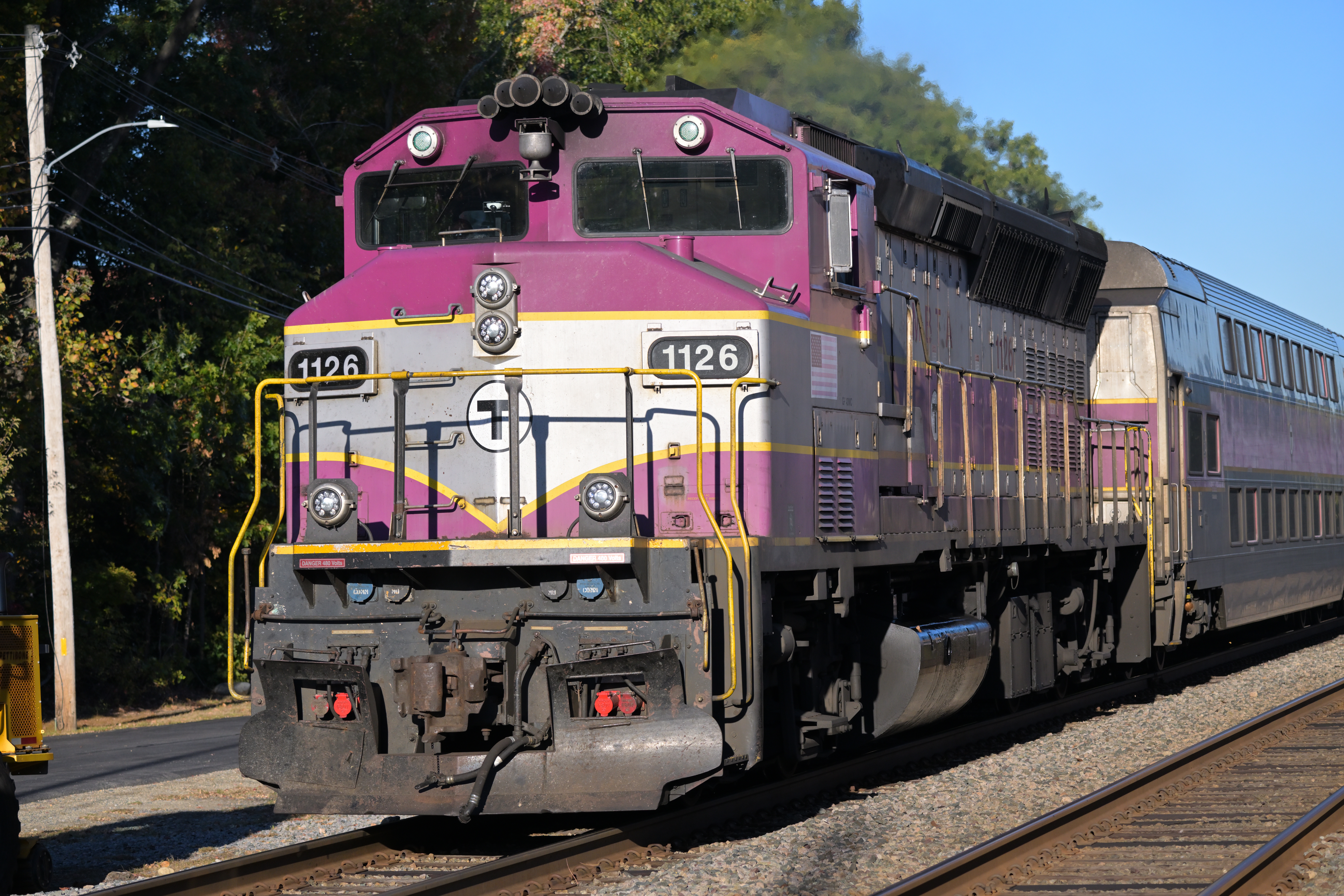
MBTA GP40MC No. 1126 leading a Fitchburg Line train through Waltham in 2025

The Massachusetts Bay Transportation Authority currently owns and operates a set of 25 GP40 passenger diesels known as GP40MCs, used on the MBTA Commuter Rail system. They were originally built by General Motors Diesel as GP40-2LWs for Canadian National in 1973–75. In 1997–98, these units were extensively rebuilt by AMF. Although they have been principally used on the lines from North Station, these locomotives can also be seen commonly on the South Station lines.

== Other locomotives ==
Other passenger locomotives based on the GP40 locomotive include the following:

- EMD/M-K RP39-2C, operated by the Virginia Railway Express. 10 units, now retired since 2010. All sold to other operators.
- EMD/M-K RP40-2C, operated by Virginia Railway Express. Two units, now retired since 2010 and sold to other operators.
- EMD/AMF GP40H-2, operated by Virginia Railway Express. Three units, now retired since 2010 and since sold to other operators.
- EMD/AMF GP40PH-2 (not to be confused with the NJT-operated units), operated by the North Carolina Department of Transportation for the Piedmont service. Two units, now retired. One was sold to Virginia Railway Express (since retired), other retired after a wreck.
- EMD/MAC GP49H-3, operated by Tri-Rail. 6 units were rebuilt by Mid American Car in 2006 after being purchased from Norfolk Southern Railway in 2001. Three units have been retired, remaining units are expected to be retired in 2029.

== See also ==
- List of GM-EMD locomotives
- List of GMD Locomotives
