= MotivePower =

American locomotive manufacturer

MotivePower, Inc.
- Type: Division (1972–1993)* Public (1994–1999)
- Industry: Transport
- Founded: 1972; (As a division of Morrison-Knudsen); 1994; (As an independent company)
- Defunct: 1999
- Fate: Merged with WABCO to form Wabtec in 1999
- Successor: Wabtec
- Headquarters: Boise, Idaho, U.S.
- Products: Diesel locomotives
- Parent: Morrison–Knudsen (1972–1993)
- Website: wabteccorp.com/motivepower

MotivePower, Inc. (MPI) was an American manufacturer of diesel-electric locomotives. The company was founded as a division of Morrison–Knudsen (MK) in 1972. After MotivePower spun-off from MK, the company merged with the air brake manufacturer WABCO to form "Wabtec" in 1999, remaining as a brand of it. The company was headquartered in Boise, Idaho, where it had its main facilities, although it also previously maintained an operation in San Luis Potosí, Mexico.

== History ==
Morrison–Knudsen established a separate rail division, MK Rail, in 1972. Morrison–Knudsen spun-off the division in 1993; it became a publicly traded company in 1994. After Morrison–Knudsen's bankruptcy in 1996, MK Rail renamed itself "MotivePower Industries", doing business as "Boise Locomotive". The company merged with Westinghouse Air Brake Company (WABCO) in November 1999 to form Wabtec.

Wabtec renamed the Boise Locomotive division to "MotivePower" in 2000. MotivePower continues as a wholly owned subsidiary of Wabtec. On September 18, 2019, several months following Wabtec's merger with GE Transportation, Wabtec announced the MotivePower Boise plant would close in early 2020 and production was shifted to Wabtec's legacy GE Transportation plant in Erie, Pennsylvania.

== Products ==
MotivePower's flagship product is the MPI MPXpress passenger locomotive. Over two hundred locomotives have been built for commuter rail operators in the United States and Canada.

- MPXpress
- MPE^{X} Switchers (MP14B, MP20B, MP20C, and MP21B)
- HSP46
- MP8AC-3 (R156)
- CBH class (MP27CN, MP33CN, and MP33C)

== Services ==
Completed at the Wabtec Erie shop in Erie, Pennsylvania, MotivePower also does overhaul work for several agencies throughout the US. These include:

- CTrail
- CSX
- New Mexico Rail Runner Express
- Norfolk Southern
- MBTA Commuter Rail
- Metro-North
- Union Pacific
- SunRail
