= EMD GP40 =

4-axle diesel-electric locomotive built by General Motors' Electro-Motive Division

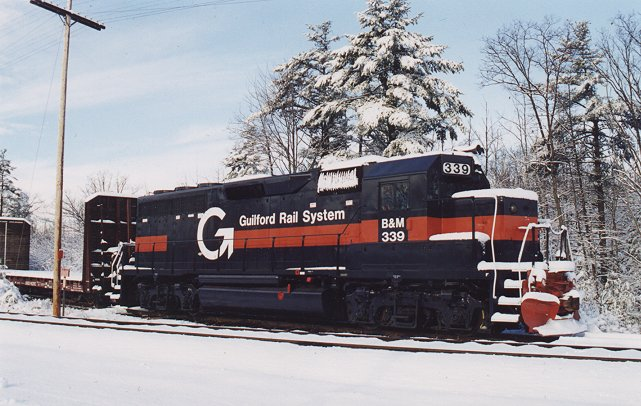
- A Guilford Rail System GP40 in Wells, Maine.
Type and origin
- Power type: Diesel-electric
- Builder: U.S., General Motors, Electro-Motive Division (EMD); Canada, General Motors Diesel (GMD)
- Model: GP40, GP40P, GP40TC
- Build date: November 1965 – December 1971
- Total produced: 1,242
Specifications
- Configuration
  - AAR: B-B
  - UIC: Bo'Bo'
- Gauge: 4 ft 8 1/2 in (1,435 mm) standard gauge
- Prime mover: EMD 16-645E3
- Engine type: V16 diesel
- Cylinders: 16
Performance figures
- Power output: 3,000 hp (2.24 MW)
Career
- Locale: North America

The EMD GP40 is a 4-axle diesel-electric locomotive built by General Motors' Electro-Motive Division between November 1965 and December 1971. It has an EMD 645E3 16-cylinder engine generating 3,000 hp (2,240 kW).

The GP40 is 3 feet (0.914 m) longer than its EMD 567D3A-engined predecessor, the GP35, and distinguished visually by its three 48-inch radiator fans at the rear of the long hood, while the GP35 has two large fans and a smaller one in between. It was built on a 55 ft (16.76 m) frame; the GP35 was built on a 52 ft (15.85 m) frame - as was the GP7, 9, 18, and 30. The difference in length can be seen in the GP40's ten handrail stanchions compared to the GP35's nine.

1,187 GP40s were built for 28 U.S. railroads; 16 were built for one Canadian carrier, Canadian National; and 18 were built for two Mexican carriers, Ferrocarril Chihuahua al Pacífico and Ferrocarriles Nacionales de México. 60 units were built with high-short-hoods and dual control stands for Norfolk & Western Railway. Two passenger versions, the GP40P and GP40TC, were also built, but on longer frames to accommodate steam generators and HEP equipment.

On January 1, 1972, the GP40 was discontinued and replaced by the GP40-2, which has a modular electrical system and a few minor exterior changes.

== Images ==
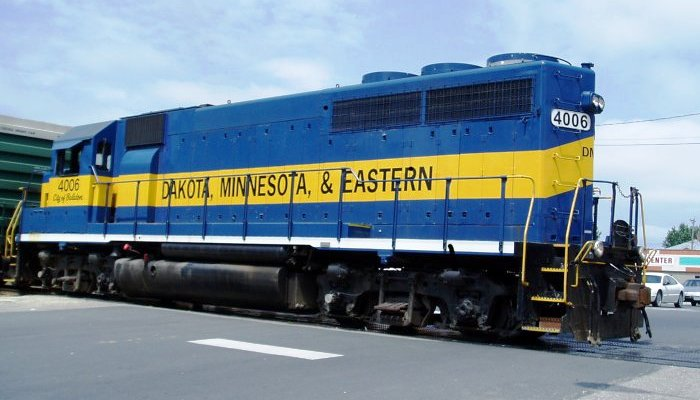
A Dakota, Minnesota and Eastern Railroad GP40 running long hood forward

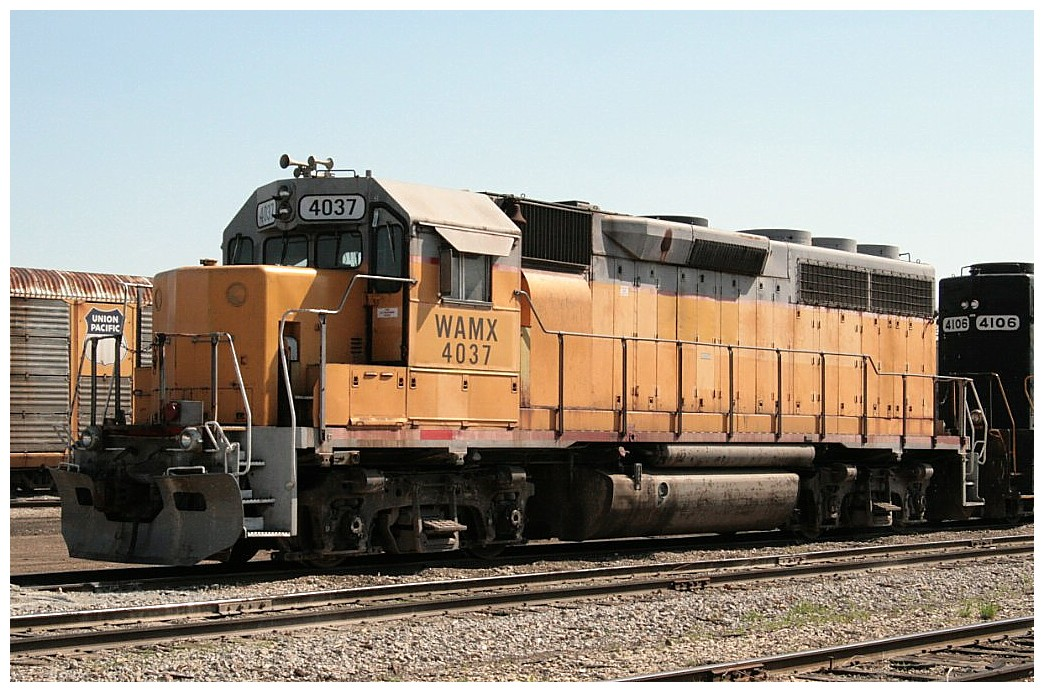
A GP40 of Union Pacific Railroad heritage, now owned by Webb Asset Management

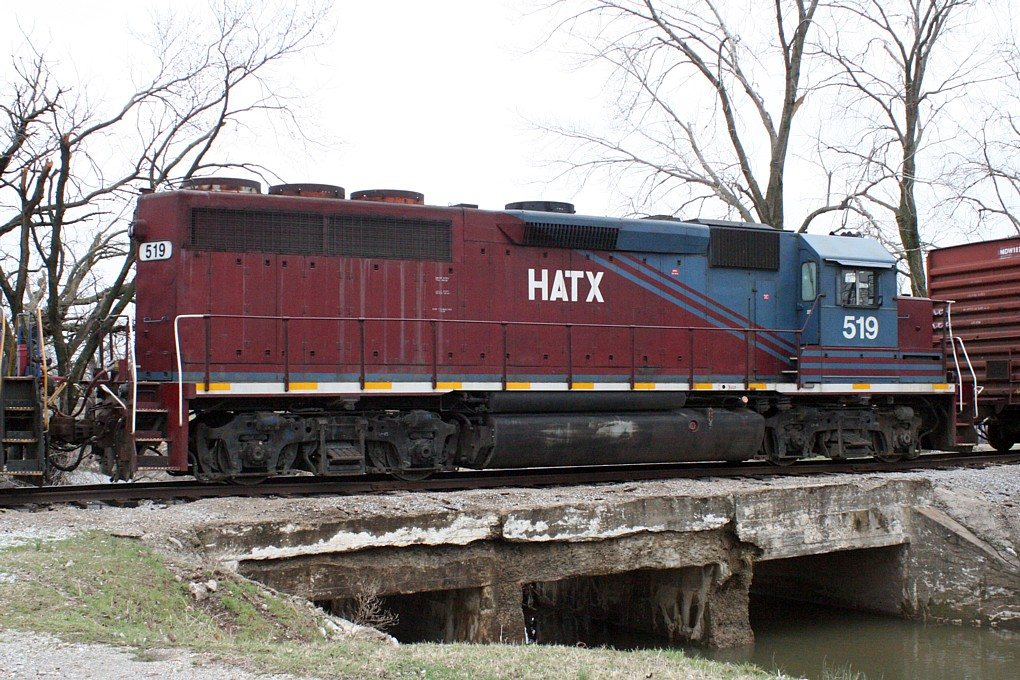
A GP40 owned by Helm Locomotive Leasing

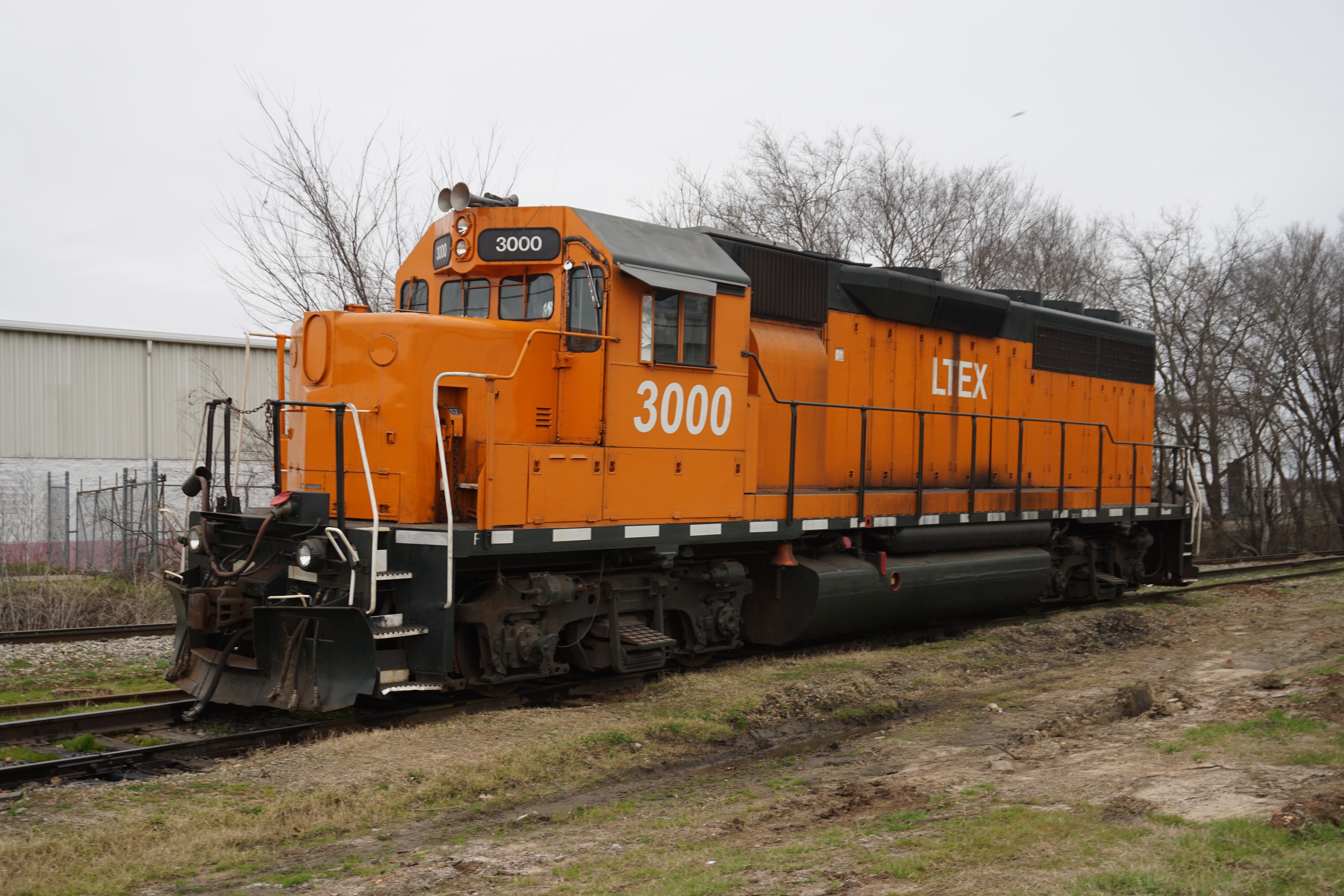
A GP40 owned by Larry's Truck & Electric (LTEX)

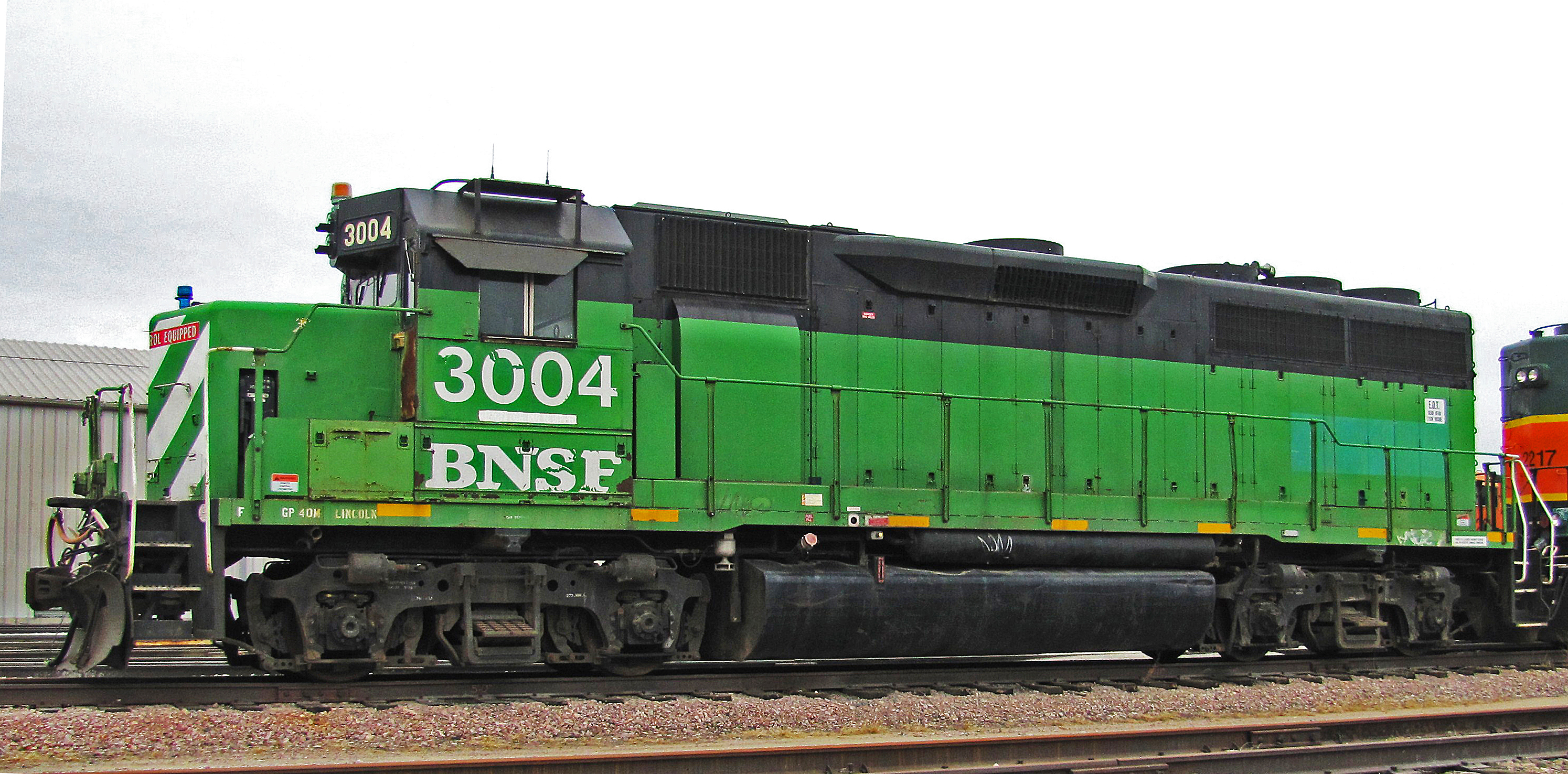
Ex-Burlington Northern GP40M No. 3004 at Lincoln, Nebraska in 2011

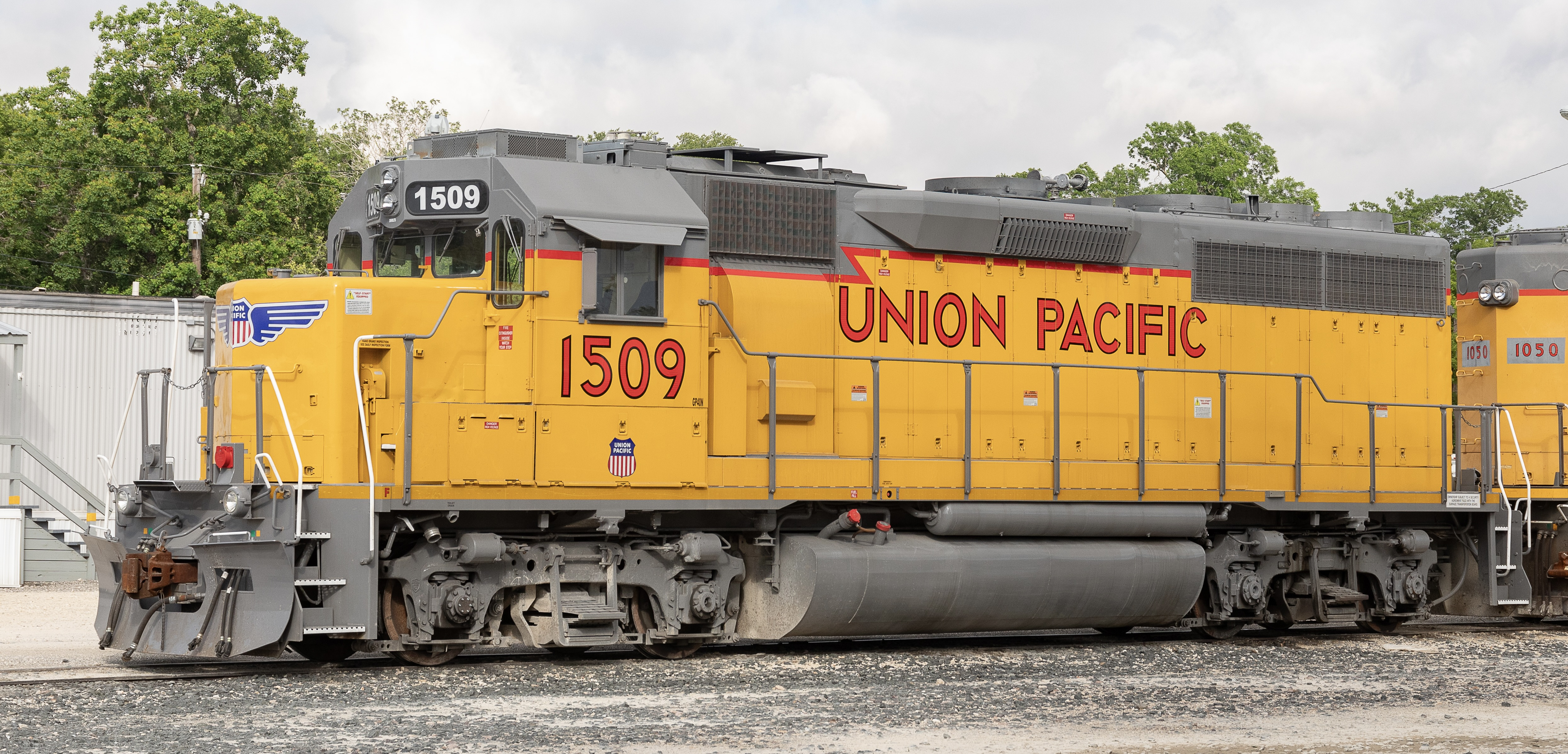
Union Pacific No. 1509 is designated as a GP40N and is rebuilt from a GP40

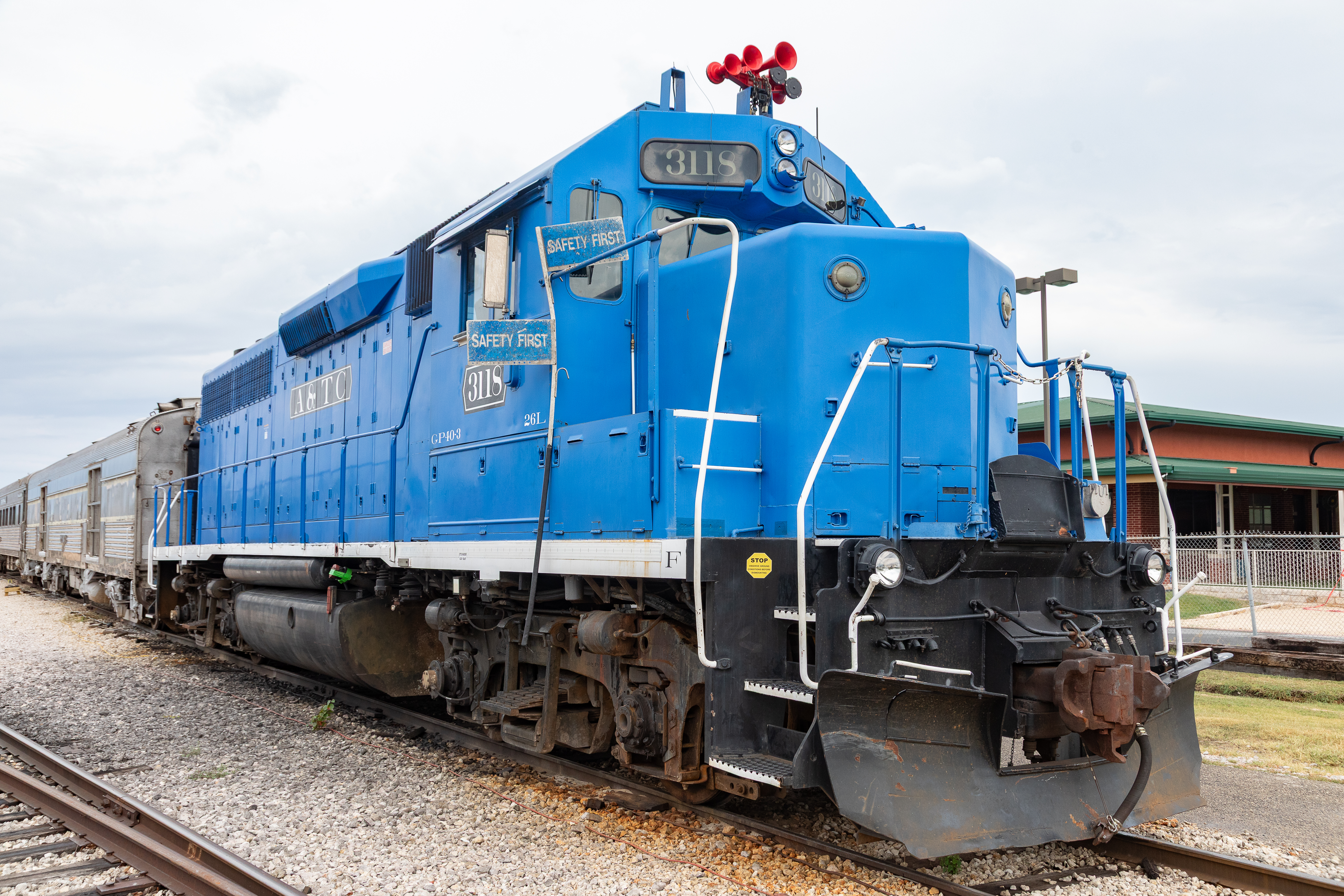
Austin Steam Train Association (ATCX) No. 3118 is a GP40-3, rebuilt from a Penn Central GP40.

== Original owners ==
Railroad	Quantity	Road Numbers	Notes
Atlanta and West Point Railroad	7	726-732	
Atlantic Coast Line Railroad	15	915-929	To Seaboard Coast Line 1500-1514
Baltimore and Ohio Railroad	161	3684-3779, 4000-4064	
Chesapeake and Ohio Railway	50	3780-3794, 4065-4099	3794 was the last GP40 built
Ferrocarril Chihuahua al Pacífico	8	1000-1007	
Chicago, Burlington and Quincy Railroad	40	170-189, 620-639	
Canadian National Railway	16	4002-4017	Built by General Motors Diesel (GMD) for use in Canada
De Queen and Eastern Railroad	1	D-7	
Denver and Rio Grande Western Railroad	43	3051-3093	
Detroit, Toledo and Ironton Railroad	6	400-405	All to the GTW renumberd 6400–6405 all to Canadian National
Florida East Coast Railway	10	401-410	
Georgia Railroad and Banking Company	4	751-754	
Illinois Central Railroad	75	3000-3074	
Louisville and Nashville Railroad	30	3000-3029	
Milwaukee Road	72	153-199, 2047-2071	2068-2071 were EMD warranty loaners
Missouri–Kansas–Texas Railroad	61	170-230	
Norfolk and Western Railway	60	1329-1388	High-nose
Ferrocarriles Nacionales de México	10	8400-8409	
New York Central Railroad	105	3000-3104	3036 was the first GP40 built. To Penn Central.
Penn Central Transportation Company	170	3105-3274	3260-3274 were EMD warranty loaners 11-26
Richmond, Fredericksburg and Potomac Railroad	7	121-127	
Chicago, Rock Island and Pacific Railroad	77	340-396, 4700-4719	Financed by Union Pacific, because of the proposed UP-RI merger
Seaboard Air Line Railroad	51	600-650	To Seaboard Coast Line 1515-1565
Seaboard Coast Line Railroad	70	1566-1635	
Soo Line Railroad	4	732-735	
St. Louis Southwestern Railway (Cotton Belt)	8	7600-7607	All were rebuilt into the model GP40R and renumbered 7960-7967.
Texas, Oklahoma and Eastern Railroad	3	D-12 - D-14	
Toledo, Peoria and Western Railway	1	1000	Ex-EMD warranty loaner
Western Railway of Alabama	7	701-707	
Western Maryland Railway	5	3795-3799	
Western Pacific Railroad	44	3501-3544	3501-3516 built with large Pyle single headlight
Totals	1,221		

GP40P

Railroad	Quantity	Road numbers	Notes
Central Railroad of New Jersey	13	3671-3683	
Totals	13		

GP40TC

Railroad	Quantity	Road numbers	Notes
Canadian National Railway	8	600-607	
Totals	8		

== Rebuilds ==
=== GP40N ===
Union Pacific has rebuilt 129 of their GP40's and GP40-2's into GP40N's at their Jenk's shop. These units received a microprocessor control system to increase adhesion, control options, and extend the life of the locomotive.

=== GP40R ===
The St. Louis Southwestern Railway (Cotton Belt) ordered eight locomotives from EMD but rebuilt all eight of them into GP40R's between January and June of 1982.

=== GP22ECO ===
The GP22ECO is a locomotive built from recycled GP40/GP40-2 parts. The frame, trucks, and carbody are refurbished, while the 16-645 engine is replaced with a new 8-710-ECO engine. The electrical system is replaced with a modern microprocessor-based system. Horsepower is reduced to 2,150 due to the smaller engine.

== Preservation ==
- Baltimore & Ohio #3684 is preserved at the National Museum of Railroad History & Innovation in Baltimore, Maryland.
- Penn Central #3118 is operational at the Austin Steam Train Association (ASTA) as ATCX #3118. The locomotive currently wears a blue paint scheme from its previous owner (Horizon Rail). It has also been updated with a microprocessor, making it a GP40-3.

== See also ==
- EMD GP40-based passenger locomotives
- List of GM-EMD locomotives
- List of GMD Locomotives
