= MPI MP21B =

Type and origin
- Power type: Diesel-electric
- Builder: MotivePower
- Model: MP21B
- Build date: 2008
- Total produced: 1
Specifications
- Gauge: 4 ft 8 1/2 in (1,435 mm) standard gauge
- Prime mover: Cummins QSK19C (×3)
- Engine type: Straight-six engine
- Aspiration: Turbocharger
- Cylinders: I6 (×3)
Performance figures
- Power output: 2,100 hp (1,570 kW)
Career
- Operators: Amtrak

The MPI MP21B is a low-emissions diesel switcher locomotive built by MotivePower. It is powered by three Cummins QSK19C I6 engines with each one developing 700 horsepower (522 kW) and creating a total power output of 2,100 horsepower (1,570 kW). One MP21B locomotive was manufactured, currently operated by Amtrak.
