= F-125 =

F-125 or F125 may refer to:

- F-125T, a type of film stock
- F125-class frigate, a type of German warship
- EMD F125, a diesel passenger locomotive
- HMS Mohawk (F125), a Tribal-class frigate launched in 1962 and sold for scrapping in 1980
- Mercedes-Benz F125, a concept car model
- UIM F-125, a type of International powerboat race
