= MP36 =

MP36 can refer to:

- A prototype of the MP 40 submachine gun
- A variant of the MPI MPXpress passenger locomotive
- A Megatron action figure released as number 36 of the Transformers Masterpiece toyline released by Takara Tomy.
