= Siemens Charger =

North American passenger locomotive family

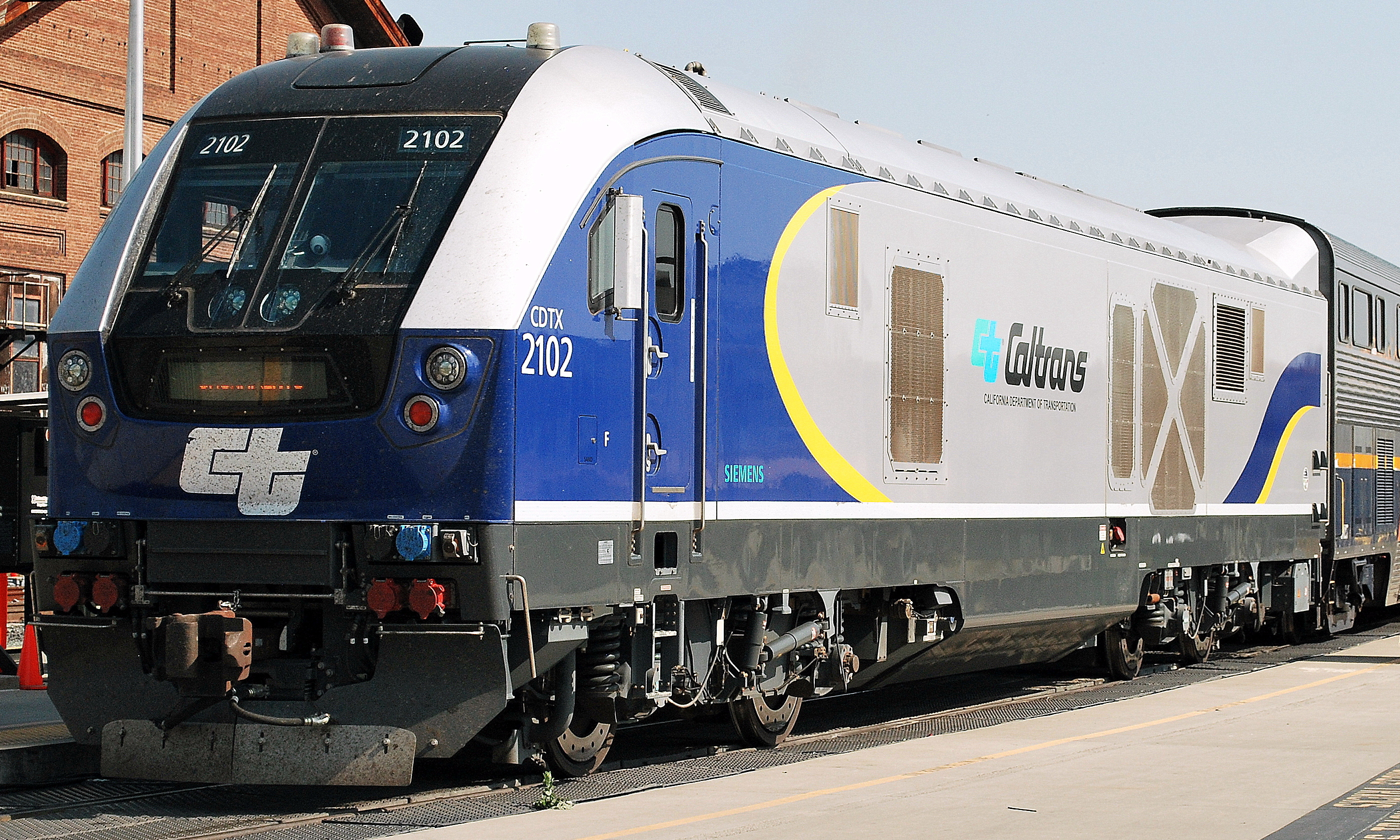
- No. 2102, a Caltrans-owned SC-44, operating on the Amtrak Capitol Corridor
Type and origin
- Power type: Diesel–electric, electric/diesel dual-mode, or battery/electric dual-power
- Builder: Siemens Mobility
- Model: ALC‑42; ALC‑42E; EC‑42; SC‑42DM; SC‑44; SCB‑40; SCD‑42E; SCV‑42
- Build date: 2016–present
- Total produced: 467 (includes units on order; see Customers section for details)
Specifications
- Configuration
  - AAR: B-B
  - UIC: Bo′Bo′
- Gauge: 4 ft 8 1/2 in (1,435 mm) standard gauge
- Trucks: Siemens model SF4
- Wheel diameter: 49–46 in (1,250–1,160 mm) (new–worn)
- Minimum curve: 250 ft (76 m)
- Wheelbase: 9.8 ft (3 m) per truck; 40.8 ft (12.436 m) between truck centers
- Length: 71.5 ft (21.793 m)
- Width: 10 ft (3.048 m)
- Height: 14.4 ft (4.39 m)
- Axle load: 67,500 lb (30,600 kg)
- Adhesive weight: 100%
- Loco weight: 260,000 lb (120,000 kg)
- Fuel type: Diesel
- Fuel capacity: SC-42DM: 1,100 US gal (4,200 L; 920 imp gal); SC-44/SCB-40: 1,800 US gal (6,800 L; 1,500 imp gal); ALC-42/SCV-42: 2,200 US gal (8,300 L; 1,800 imp gal)
- Electric system/s: Third rail, 750 V DC; Overhead line: 25 kV 60 Hz AC; 12.5 kV 60 Hz AC; 12 kV 25 Hz AC
- Current pickups: SC-42DM: Contact shoe; ALC-42E: Pantograph on Auxiliary Power Vehicle; B+AC: Pantograph
- Prime mover: Cummins QSK95
- RPM range: 600–1,800
- Engine type: 45° V16, four stroke cycle
- Aspiration: Turbocharger
- Displacement: 95 L (5,800 cu in)
- Traction motors: Four Siemens 3-phase AC induction motors; 978 hp (729 kW) each
- Head end power: 660 or 1,000 kW; 3φ, 60 Hz, 480 V AC
- Cylinders: 16
- Cylinder size: 5.9375 L (362.33 cu in)
- Transmission: AC–DC–AC
- Loco brake: Dynamic, regenerative, electropneumatic
- Train brakes: Electropneumatic
- Safety systems: Positive train control: ACSES II, I-ETMS
Performance figures
- Maximum speed: 125 mph (201 km/h)
- Power output: -40 models: 4,000 hp (3,000 kW); -42 models: 4,200 hp (3,100 kW); -44 models: 4,400 hp (3,300 kW); SC-42DM on third rail: 2,100 hp (1,600 kW); ALC-42E w/APV on electric mode: 5,700 hp (4,300 kW)
- Tractive effort: Starting (Diesel): 290 kN (65,000 lbf); Continuous (Diesel): 275 kN (62,000 lbf) @ 16 mph (26 km/h); Starting (third rail): 250 kN (56,000 lbf) to 12 1/2 mph (20 km/h); Starting (Airo w/APV): 365 kN (82,000 lbf)
- Factor of adh.: 4.07 (24.57%)
- Data refers to the following except where noted

The Siemens Charger is a family of passenger locomotives built by Siemens Mobility for use in North America. The Charger family includes several variants developed for specific operators and service types including long-distance, inter-city and commuter rail, as well as different power sources including diesel, overhead wire, third rail, and batteries.

The diesel SC-44 model is used primarily for state-supported inter-city routes and commuter rail services. The SCB-40 variant was developed for Brightline in Florida, while the SCV-42 is used by Via Rail in Canada. Amtrak operates the ALC-42 for its long-distance routes and has ordered the ALC-42E, a dual-mode version capable of operating on externally-supplied electric power, for routes that travel over portions of the Northeast Corridor; Charger-family locomotives will eventually replace the aging GE Genesis fleet. A third rail dual-mode version, the SC-42DM, is also available, as well as a battery-electric model, the Charger B+AC.

The first production Charger locomotive, an SC-44, was unveiled on March 26, 2016, and began revenue service on August 24, 2017.

== Design ==
The locomotive shares much of its overall design with the Siemens Vectron diesel and electric locomotives used in Europe and the Siemens ACS-64 electric locomotive built for Amtrak. However, unlike these locomotives which have two cabs, Charger has an asymmetrical, single-cab design, like many North American diesel locomotives.

Diesel models of the Charger are powered by a Cummins 16-cylinder QSK95 4-stroke high speed diesel engine, which meets United States Environmental Protection Agency's more stringent Tier 4 emissions standards that took effect in 2015. Power output varies by model: the SCB-40 produces 4,000 hp (3,000 kW), the SC-44 produces 4,400 hp (3,300 kW), and the ALC-42, SCV-42, SC-42DM (in diesel mode) produce 4,200 hp (3,100 kW). The maximum speed in service is 125 mph (201 km/h).

Four Insulated-gate bipolar transistor (IGBT) power inverters carry electric current to each of the four AC traction motors. A static inverter off of the main prime mover supplies head-end power (HEP). The locomotive also features dynamic braking with regenerative capability, allowing the locomotive to divert power generated by dynamic braking away from the resistor grids to HEP and onboard locomotive auxiliary power demands.

Dual-mode SC-42DM locomotives have contact shoes on their trucks and DC line filters connected to the traction converter cubicle. Locomotives are capable of operating on a 650V/750V DC third rail power with onboard energy storage for use by Metro-North and the Long Island Rail Road, as well as intercity service on Amtrak's Empire Corridor. Locomotive also has a cubicle with ultracaps for shunting operations without a train at low speeds in the maintenance and workshop area, without using a third rail and without starting its own diesel engine.

California's SC-44s have aerodynamic "spoilers" on the rear of their roofs that match the height of bi-level California and Surfliner railcars.

The diesel Charger competes with other Tier 4-compliant passenger locomotives, including the EMD F125 and MPI MPXpress MP54AC. However, as of 2026, Metrolink is the only operator to purchase the F125, receiving 40 units, while GO Transit was the only customer for the MP54AC, purchasing 16 units. By comparison, more than 400 Charger locomotives have been ordered. As of 2026, the F125 and MP54AC are no longer listed as in production by either manufacturer.

B+AC Charger locomotives can draw power from overhead catenary wires or a 3.1 megawatt-hour (MWh) onboard battery. They produce up to 4.0 megawatts (5,400 hp) under catenary power and 3.3 megawatts (4,400 hp) in battery mode, with a top speed of 125 miles per hour (201 km/h). The claimed battery range is 100 miles (160 km), depending on train configuration and route conditions. The battery can be charged by the overhead line while underway, plugging into a 480 V charger while stopped for an extended period, or by energy recovered through regenerative braking.

Siemens Venture trainsets; showing cab cars (left) and their respective Charger locomotives (right), as well as Via Rail trainsets with SCV-42 cab design (top) and Amtrak Airo traisets with ALC-42 cab design (bottom)

Charger locomotives are often paired with Siemens Venture passenger cars to form trainsets with a cohesive exterior design. Most Venture trainsets use a push–pull configuration, with a cab car at one end featuring an operator's compartment similar to that of a Charger locomotive. An exception is Brightline, which operates Venture trainsets in a double-ended configuration, with a Charger locomotive at each end.

The Venture-based Amtrak Airo trainsets for the Northeast Corridor use a hybrid configuration consisting of a Charger locomotive and an adjacent auxiliary power vehicle (APV) or battery car, connected by high-voltage cables. The APV has pantographs and a transformer to collect power from the overhead line and supply it to the locomotive, as well as powered axles to provide additional traction on electrified lines. The battery car stores electricity, allowing the locomotive to operate with its diesel engine off and eliminating engine emissions during battery-powered operation.

== Service history ==
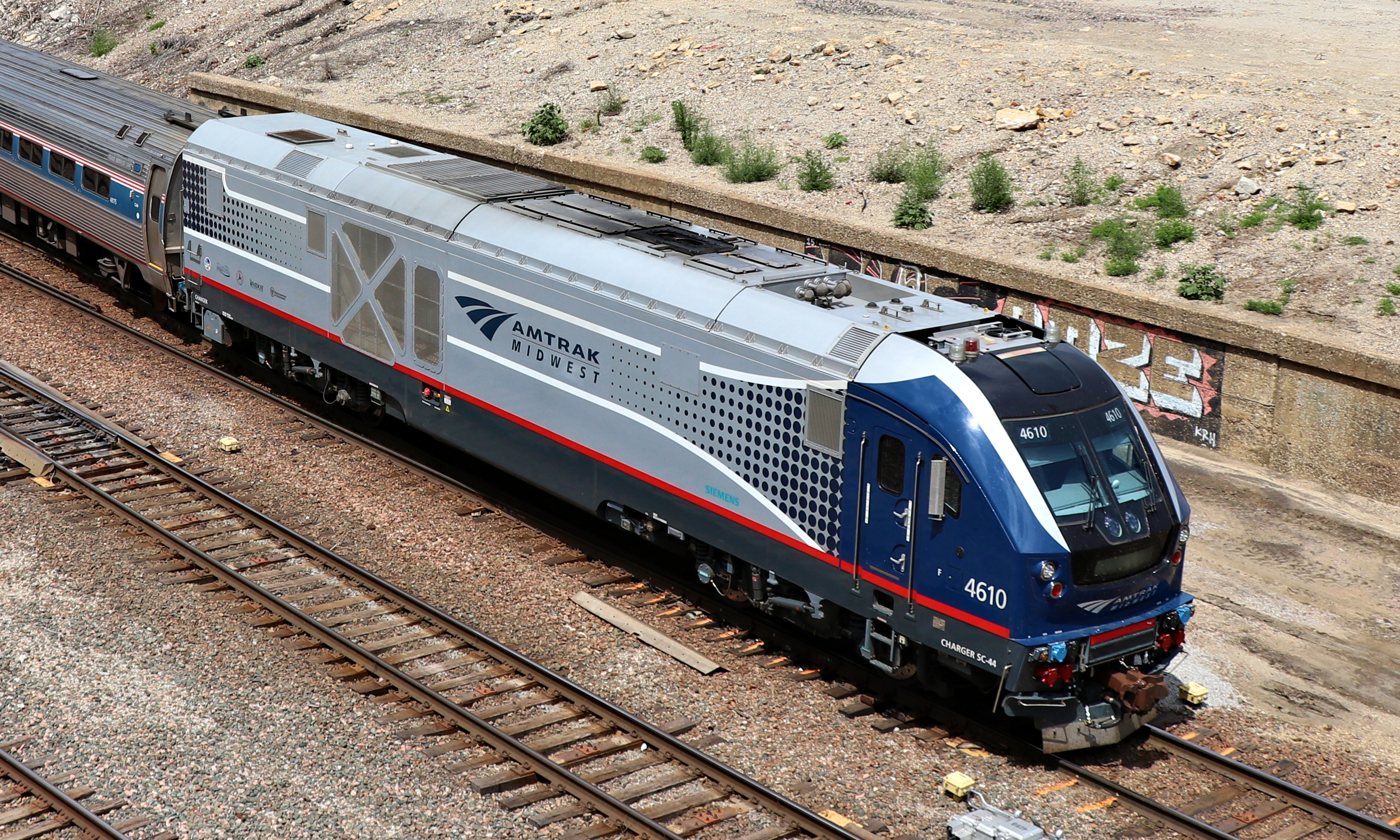
Charger leading a Missouri River Runner train in June 2018

The first production SC-44 unit was unveiled on March 26, 2016. The first two Charger locomotives to leave Siemens's factory in Florin, California, were transported to the Transportation Technology Center (TTC) in Pueblo, Colorado, in June 2016 and underwent testing of performance metrics such as acceleration and braking. The first Brightline SCB-40 locomotives were delivered in December 2016 to undergo testing in Florida.

In February 2017, Amtrak and the Washington State Department of Transportation began testing one of the Midwest-bound SC-44 locomotives along the Cascades corridor in the Pacific Northwest for federal certification. Additional test runs were conducted on the Midwest and Northern California routes in April and May. Testing at up to 135 miles per hour (217 km/h) was conducted at TTC and on the Northeast Corridor in September 2016 which resulted in federal certification for 125-mile-per-hour (201 km/h) operations.

Revenue testing on the Capitol Corridor and San Joaquins routes in Northern California began on May 25, 2017. During these tests, the trains operated with a second locomotive in case of failure. The Northern California units were formally accepted and approved for solo service on October 23, 2017. The SC-44 entered revenue testing on the Midwest routes in July 2017, with solo revenue service beginning on a Hiawatha train on August 24, 2017. Revenue service on the Cascades route began in November 2017.

Brightline began revenue operations with its SCB-40 locomotives on January 13, 2018. The first Chargers for MARC began testing that month, and revenue service began on April 5, 2018. Pre-revenue testing began on the Pacific Surfliner in October 2018; revenue service began later that year.

The first ALC-42 for Amtrak's long distance trains was put into service on the westbound Empire Builder on February 8, 2022, after extensive testing in the Midwest and on the Empire Builder route. Of the two units on the inaugural service, one was Amtrak's "Day 1" heritage unit No. 301.

Winter weather unique to the Americas has caused problems for the Charger series. A Federal Railroad Administration spokesman said that "the light-dry snow of the midwest was not anticipated by Siemens." The air filters of the dynamic brake system allowed the snow to enter, causing ground faults that would stop the train. This issue was remedied in 2023.

== Customers ==
Owner	Model	Qty.	Notes
Altamont Corridor Express	SC-44	6	
Amtrak	ALC-42	125	
Amtrak	ALC-42E	78	Locomotives for Amtrak Airo. Primary diesel mover + optional electrical power pick up from Auxiliary Power Vehicle in adjacent coach.
Amtrak Midwest	SC-44	33	
Brightline	SCB-40	21	
California Department of Transportation	SC-44	24	
Coaster	SC-44	9	
Connecticut Department of Transportation	SC-42DM	6	Diesel + third rail. For service on Metro-North.
Exo	EC-42	10	
Long Island Rail Road	SC-42DM	44	Diesel + third rail. To be delivered by 2031
MARC	SC-44	8	
Massachusetts Bay Transportation Authority	TBD	10	Diesel model.
Massachusetts Bay Transportation Authority	TBD	10	Overhead catenary + battery model. Order includes options for up to 50 additional locomotives
Metro-North Railroad	SC-42DM	27	Diesel + third rail. To be delivered by 2027.
Metro-North Railroad	TBD	13	Overhead catenary + battery model. To be delivered by 2030.
Ontario Northland	SC-42	3	
Trinity Railway Express	SCD-42E	5	
Tri-Rail	SC-42	7	Order includes options for up to 22 additional locomotives.
Via Rail	SCV-42	32	
Washington State Department of Transportation	SC-44	9	No. 1402 scrapped after derailment
Total		480	

=== Altamont Corridor Express ===
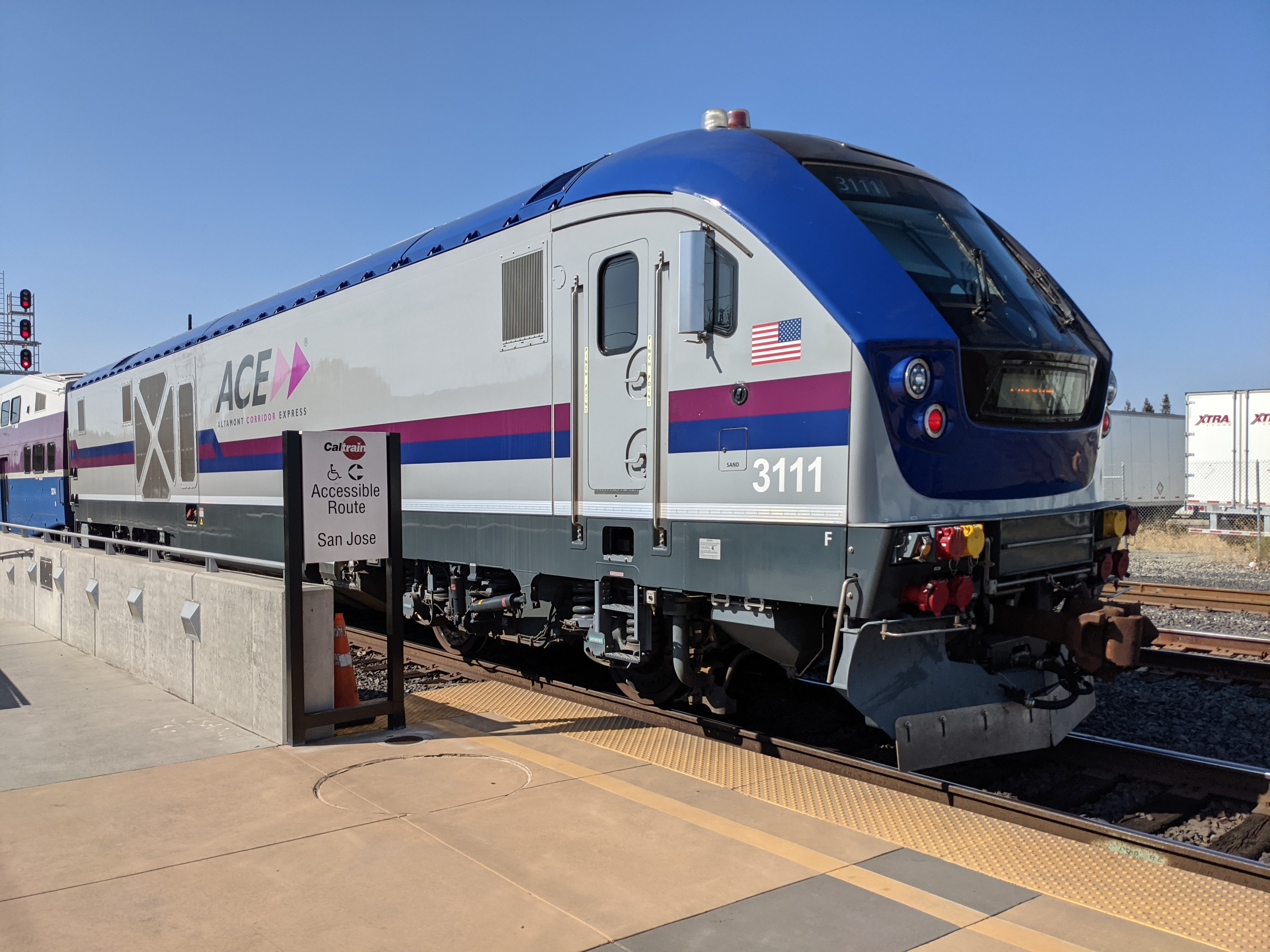
ACE SC-44 No. 3111 at Santa Clara station

California regional commuter line Altamont Corridor Express ordered four SC-44 locomotives in April 2018, with deliveries beginning in December 2019. They entered revenue service in 2020.

=== Amtrak ===
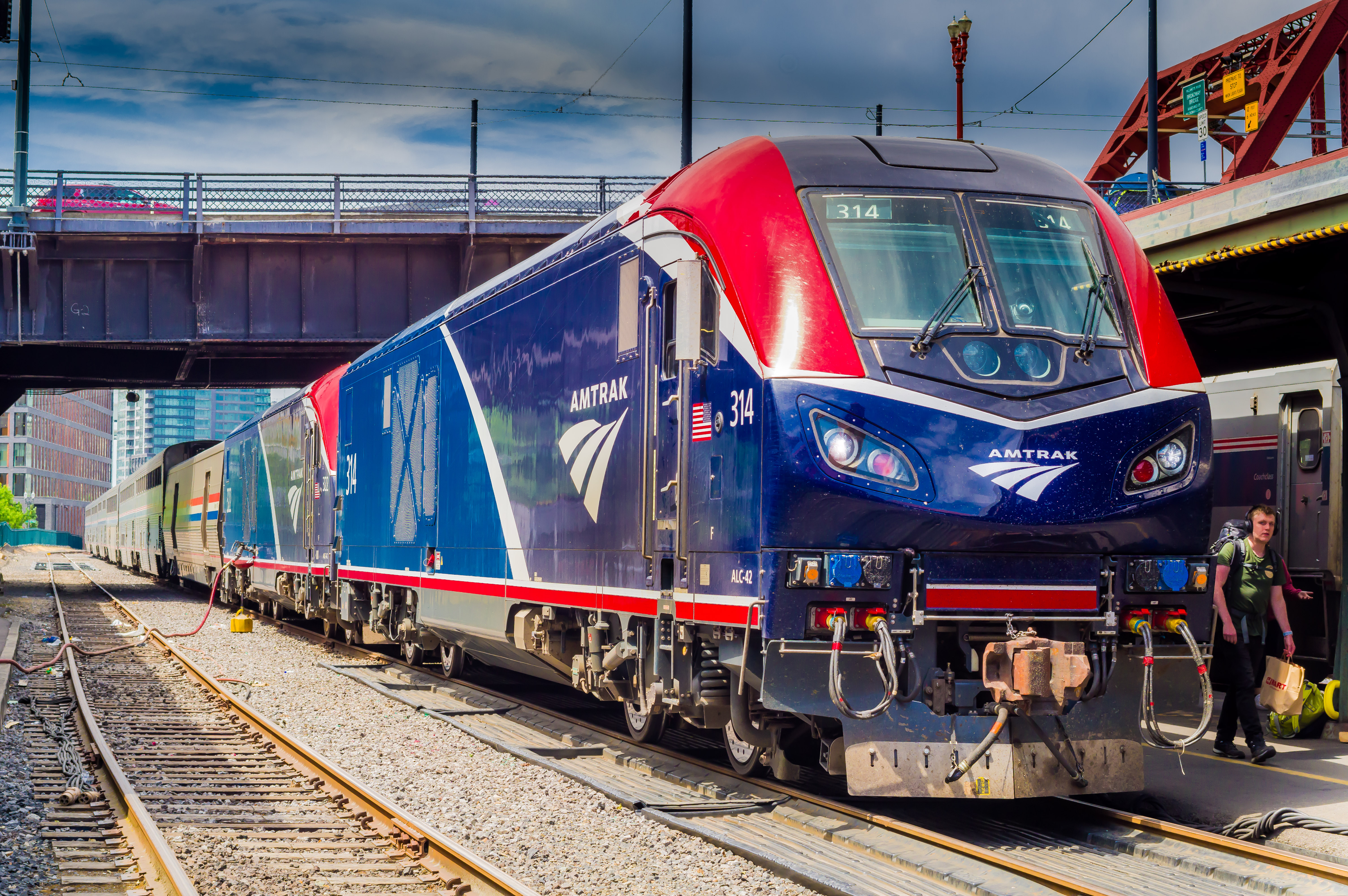
ALC-42 No. 314 and 322 double heading at Portland Union Station

==== National network ====
On December 21, 2018, Amtrak ordered 75 ALC-42 locomotives with options for an additional 100. The first locomotive entered service in February 2022, with the last expected by 2024.

Compared with the SC-44, changes were made to the ALC-42 to make it more suitable for long-distance service: additional positive train control systems for nationwide service, a larger 2,200-U.S.-gallon (8,300 L) diesel fuel tank (instead of 1,800 U.S. gal [6,800 L]), a larger diesel exhaust fluid tank, a larger sandbox, a more powerful 1,000-kilowatt head-end power generator (up from 600 kW), an extended nose section for easier repair in the event of minor front-end collision, and a prime mover de-rated to 4,200 horsepower (3,100 kW) to lengthen maintenance intervals.

Assembly of the first ALC-42 began in March 2020. On August 5, 2020, Amtrak announced that one of the first six locomotives will be painted in a replica of the "Day 1" livery to commemorate 50 years of Amtrak service, while the other five will feature a preliminary "Phase VI" paint scheme. The remainder of the fleet will introduce a new "Phase VII" livery. By February 2021, 12 units had begun production, with the first locomotive, AMTK 300, delivered to Amtrak on June 17. The first ALC-42 locomotives entered revenue service on the Empire Builder on February 8, 2022. On the same day, Amtrak announced that they had ordered an additional 50 ALC-42s, bringing the total number of locomotives ordered to 125.

==== Amtrak Airo ====
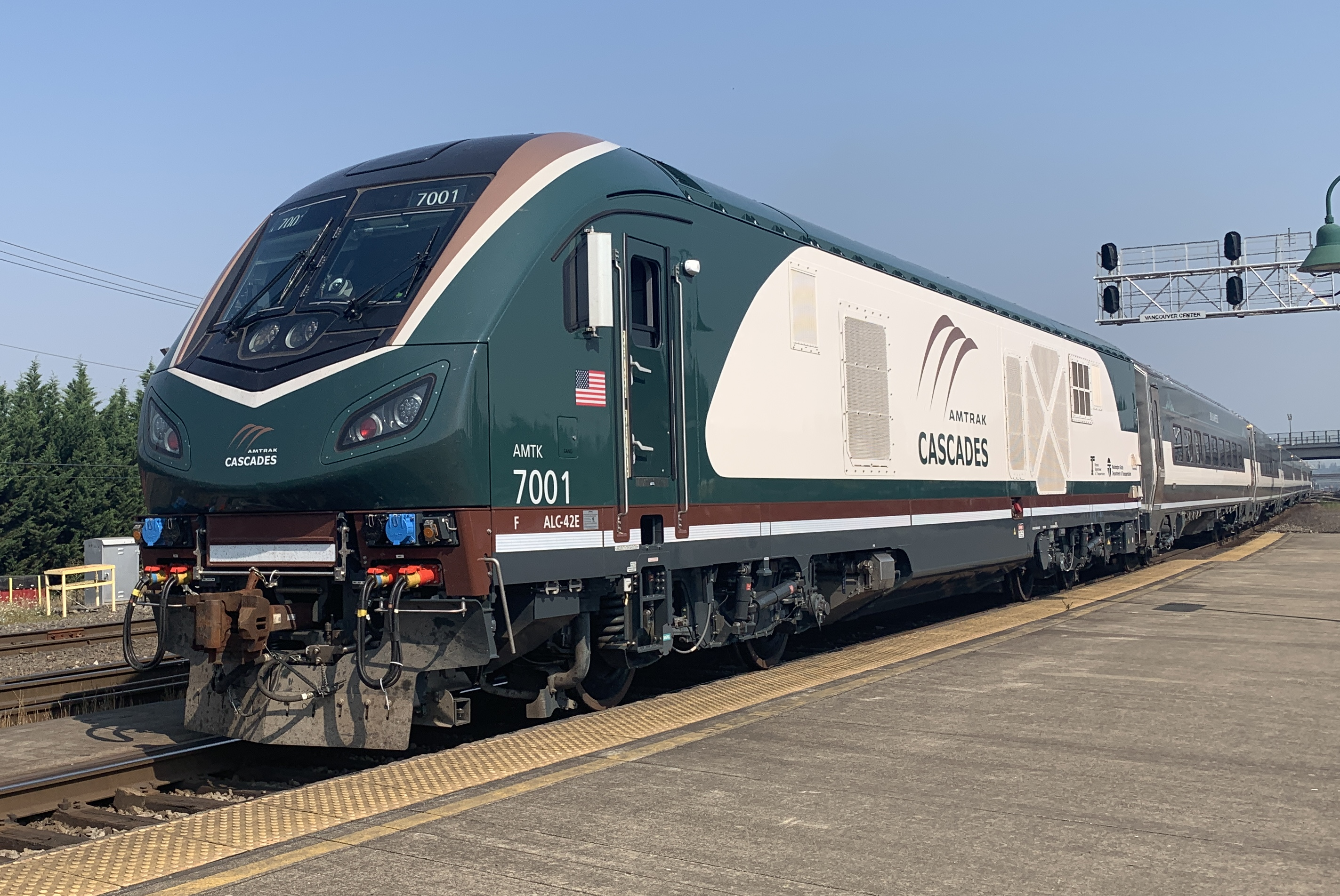
First ALC-42E No. 7001 with Airo trainset for the Cascades service

Amtrak purchased 78 ALC-42E locomotives for 83 trainsets as part of its Amtrak Airo procurement, including 75 trainsets for Northeast Corridor and 8 trainsets for the Amtrak Cascades service.

Most Amtrak Airo trainsets are designed to operate on both electrified and non-electrified lines without the need to change locomotives. This is achieved through a hybrid configuration using a ALC-42E locomotive and either an Auxiliary Power Vehicle (APV) or a battery car. However, only three of the eight trainsets for the Amtrak Cascades service have been delivered with ALC-42E locomotives; while the five remaining trainsets will be operated using the existing fleet of SC-44 locomotives.

In diesel mode, the ALC-42E works like a typical diesel–electric locomotive, using its diesel engine to generate electricity for its motors. In electric mode, the ALC-42E uses either an APV or a battery car to send electricity to the locomotive, as it does not have its own pantographs to draw power from overhead lines.

The first locomotive with fleet number 7001 (initially numbered as 70001) for the Amtrak Cascades service entered into revenue service on September 30, 2026. As of August 2026, three ALC-42E locomotives with fleet numbers 7001, 7002 and 7004 have been delivered. The first dual-mode trainset, ALC-42E No. 7003 (along with APV No. 71301, and cab car No. 79001), was completed on May 28, 2026. The set has begun testing in Pueblo, CO in June 2026.

==== State-supported corridors ====
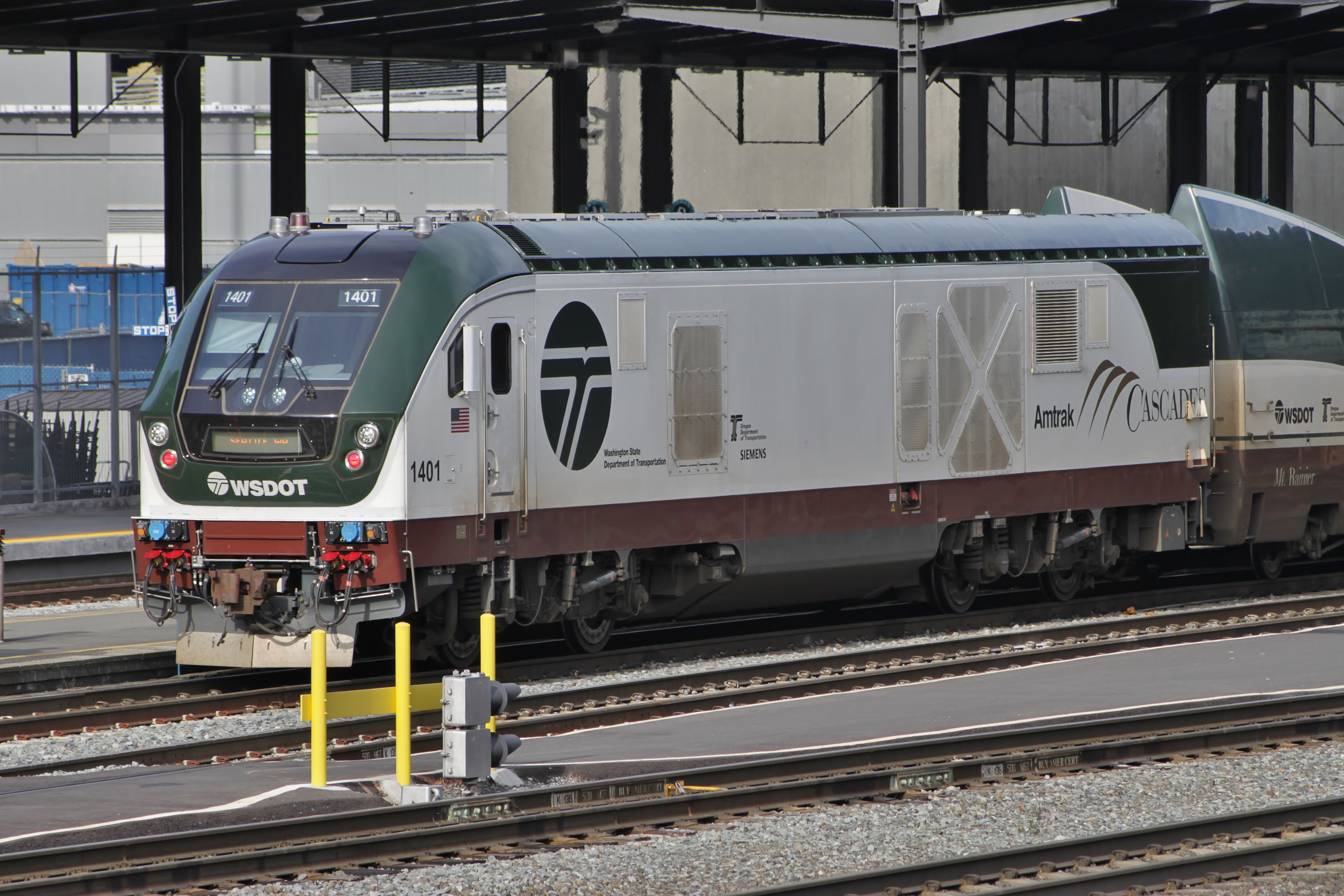
WSDOT SC-44 No. 1401 in Seattle

The Illinois Department of Transportation (IDOT), in conjunction with its counterparts in California, Michigan, Missouri and Washington, purchased 32 SC-44 locomotives for state-supported corridor services, operated by Amtrak under contract.

The $225 million order placed in March 2014 included options for an additional 75 corridor-configured locomotives In 2015, IDOT ordered 12 additional units for use on the upgraded Lincoln Service corridor. California ordered 16 additional units in November 2015 for use on the Pacific Surfliner beginning in 2018, plus two more units in 2016 for the Northern California services. Washington state ordered an additional unit to replace locomotive 1402, which was lost in the 2017 Washington train derailment and two more in connection with its purchase of new Siemens trainsets.

A total of 68 locomotives (32 base and 36 options) were ordered for Amtrak state corridors in this contract: 24 for California, 11 for Washington state, and 33 for the Midwest states. Another eight options were exercised by MARC, bringing total contract orders to 76.

=== Brightline ===
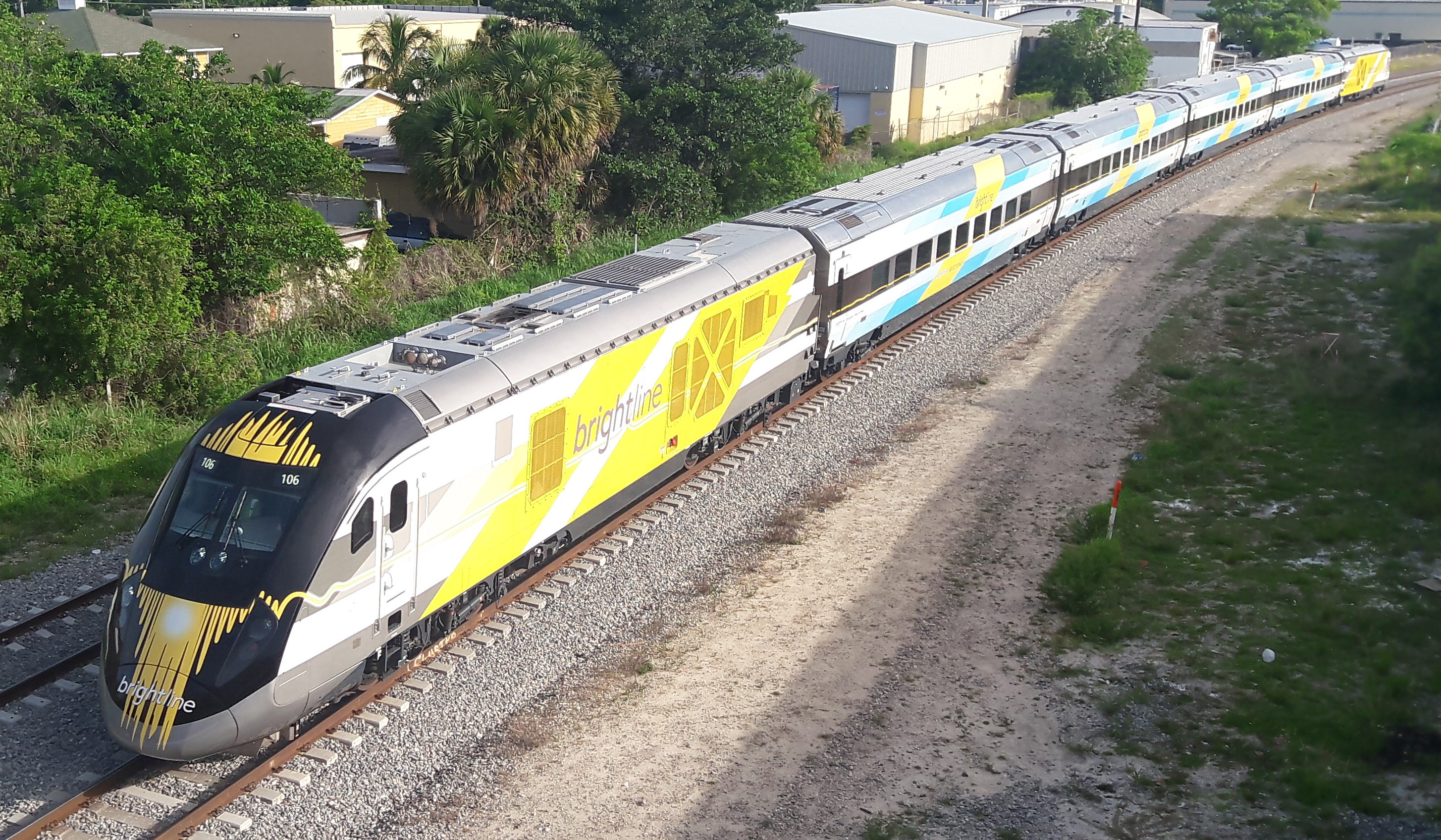
A double-ended Brightline train with SCB-40 No. 106 leading a test train with Venture cars and another SCB-40 in the rear

In September 2014, Brightline purchased ten SCB-40 locomotives with options for an additional eleven. The locomotives are used in pairs, bookending four passenger cars (expandable to seven) on Brightline's Miami–Orlando service. The SCB-40s have a streamlined front end that conceals the front coupler behind a removable nose cone and produce a maximum of 4,000 hp (3,000 kW) instead of the 4,400 hp (3,300 kW) on the SC-44. Brightline later ordered five additional trainsets and one extra locomotive (eleven locomotives total) for use on the extension to Orlando, with delivery between September 2021 and 2023. These locomotives have been able to reach speeds of up to 130 mph. As of February 19, 2023, all trainsets and the spare locomotive have been delivered to Brightline.

=== Coaster ===
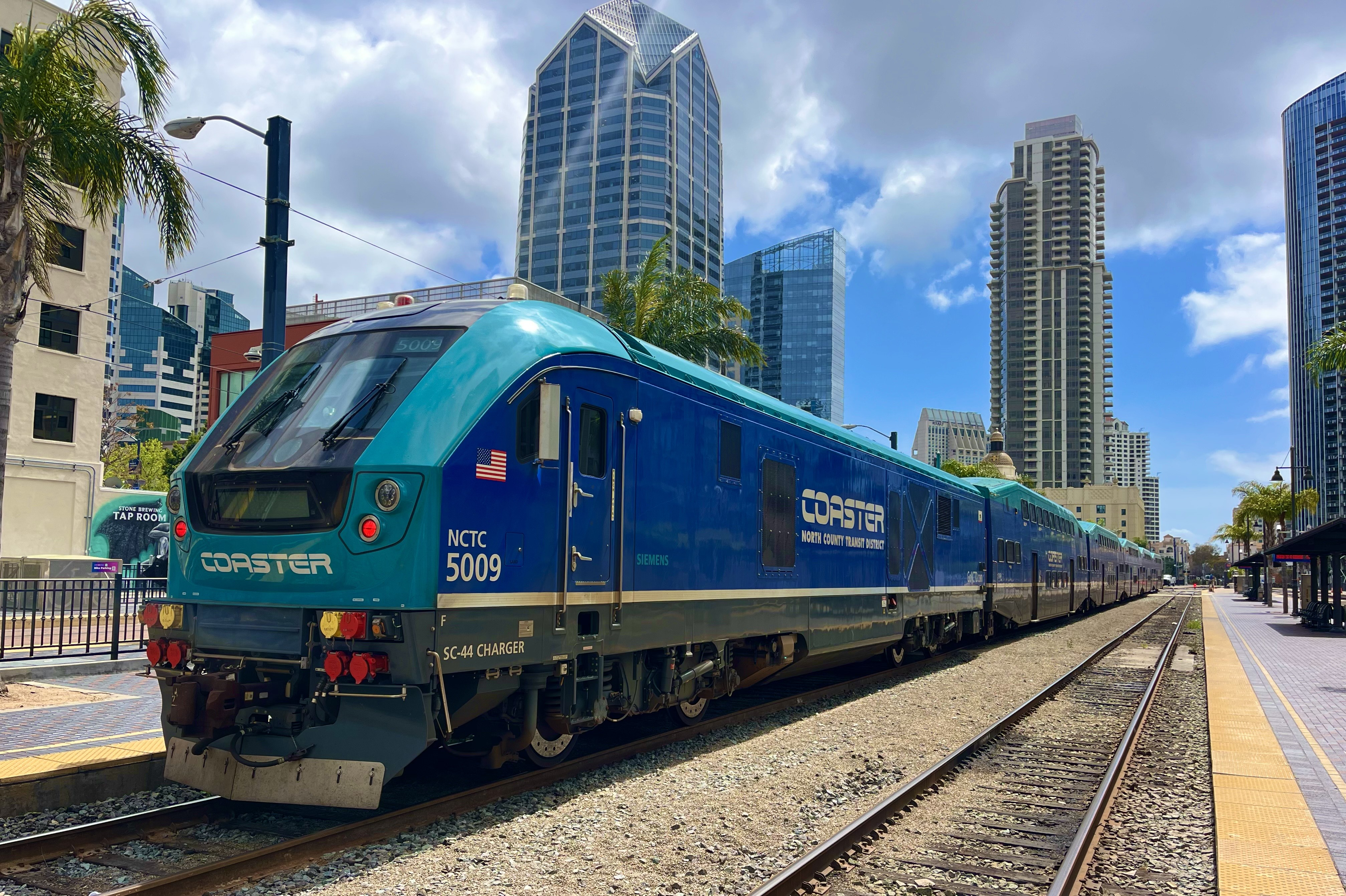
Coaster SC-44 No. 5009 at Santa Fe Depot (San Diego)

In June 2018, the North County Transit District Board of Directors approved the purchase of five SC-44s for its San Diego-area Coaster commuter rail service, replacing five older F40PH locomotives. Deliveries began in August 2020 and are expected to conclude in the spring of 2021. Two additional units were approved in June 2019, and another two in September. These additional locomotives replaced two F59PHI locomotives and will allow for increased service levels. The first five locomotives entered revenue service on February 8, 2021. Two more units were approved in 2020, and the last four entered service in 2023.

=== Exo ===
Exo EX-42 No. 1406 at Sainte-Rose station

In January 2022, Montreal's Exo ordered ten Siemens Chargers to update their commuter rail fleet. They are planned to replace the aging F59PH locomotives and can haul ten double-deck passenger coaches instead of eight.

The locomotives are designated as EC-42 and painted in black and silver livery. On November 18, 2024, the first unit was delivered and began tests around July 2025. The first locomotive, 1400, entered service on November 3, 2025. Locomotives are used on the Saint-Jérôme and Vaudreuil-Hudson lines with Bombardier and CRRC double-deck passenger coaches. The remaining locomotives will be gradually delivered throughout 2026.

=== MARC ===
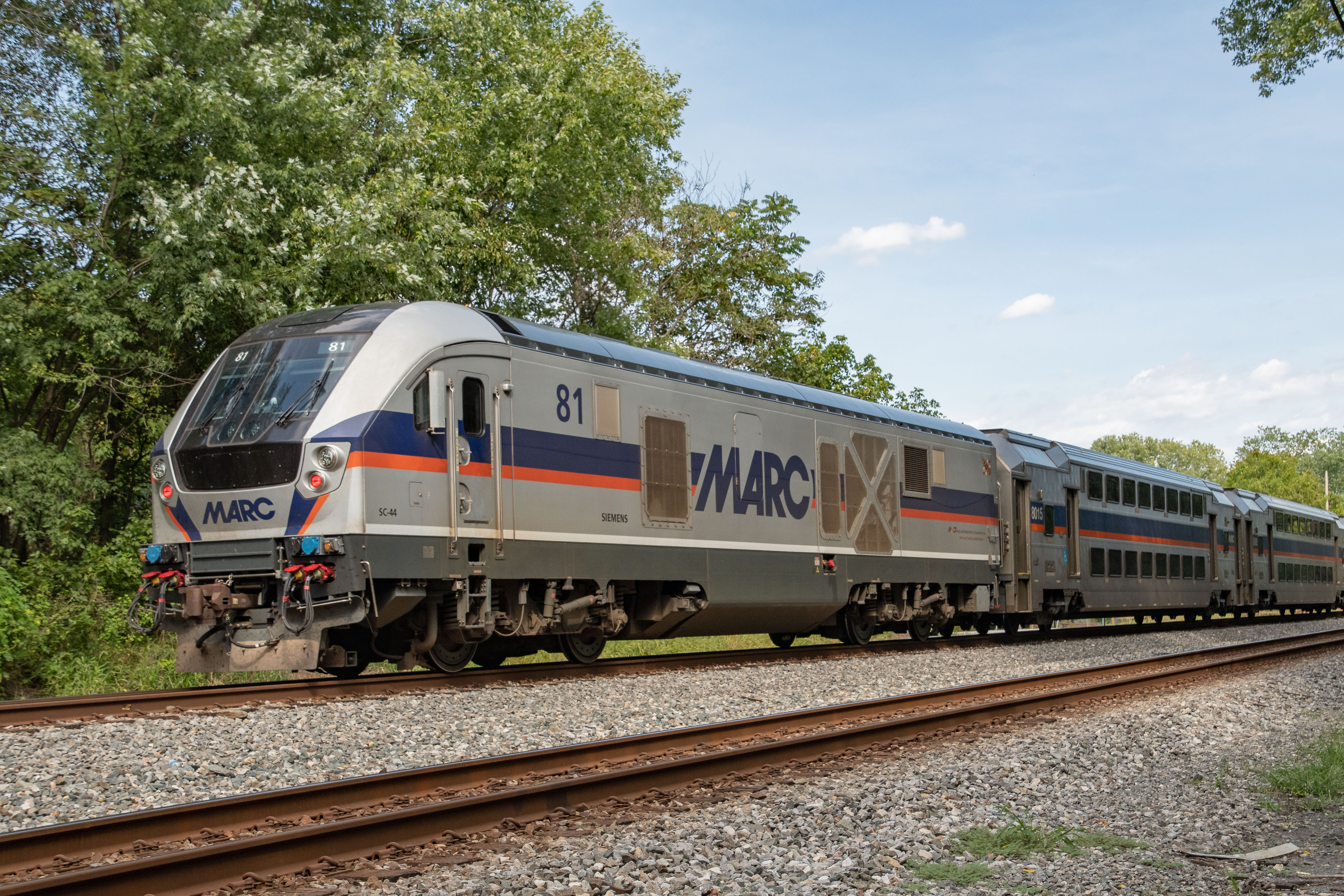
MARC SC-44 No. 81

MARC announced in August 2015 that it was seeking $58 million to purchase eight locomotives to replace their aging electric-powered AEM-7 units, with deliveries planned for late 2017. The purchase was approved by the Maryland Board of Public Works on September 16, 2015. The MARC order uses part of the Amtrak state-corridor options. The first MARC Charger was shipped from the Siemens factory in early December 2017, and began testing in mid-January 2018.

=== MBTA ===
In October 2026, the Massachusetts Bay Transportation Authority announced plans to procure 20 Siemens Charger locomotives to replace aging F40PH-3C and GP40MC locomotives, reduce emissions, and improve regional rail reliability. The order consists of ten diesel locomotives and ten dual catenary/battery electric locomotives for use on the MBTA's electrified Providence/Stoughton Line, as well as options for 50 additional locomotives of either type.

=== Long Island Rail Road/Metro-North Railroad/CTDOT ===
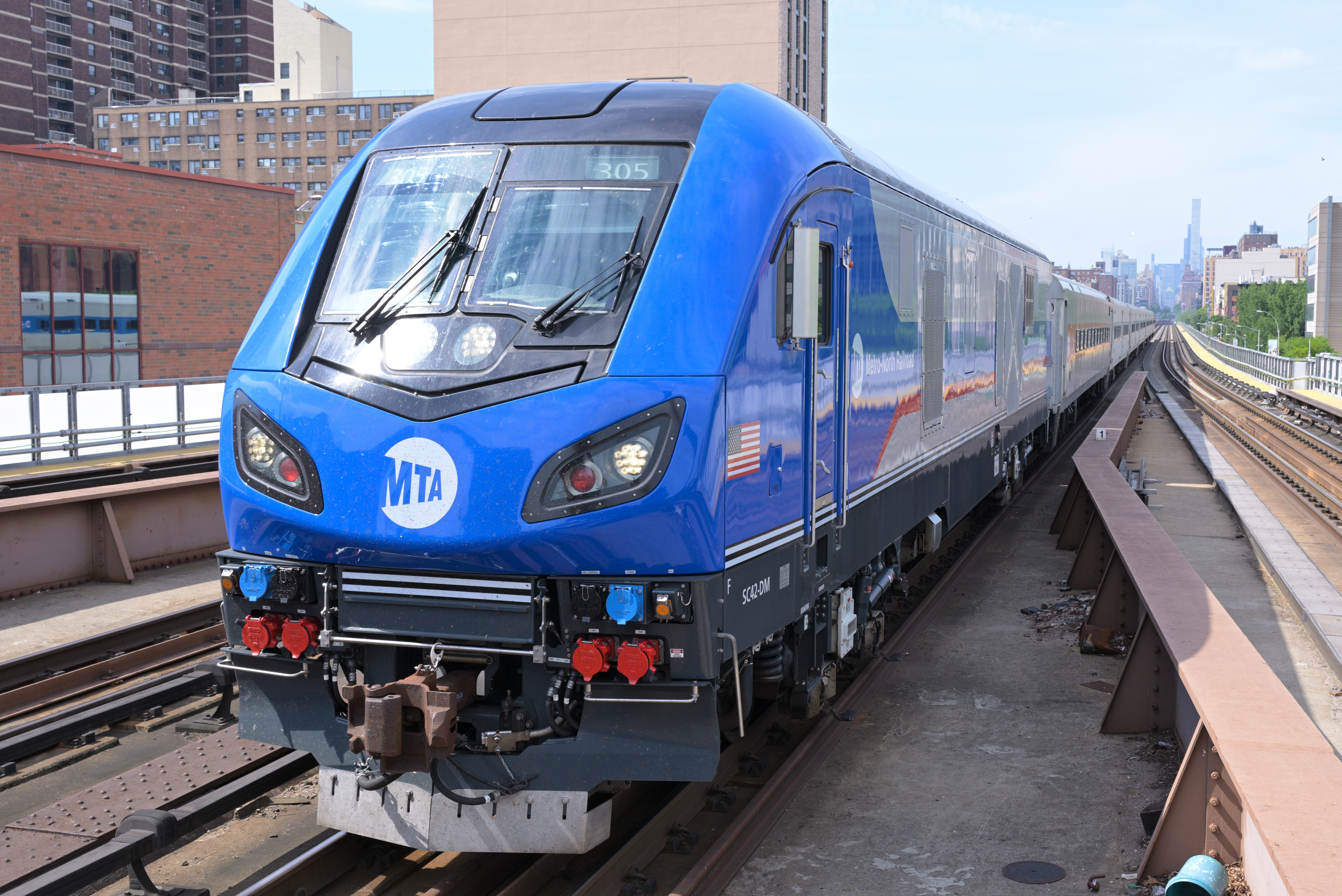
Metro-North Railroad SC-42DM No. 305 approaching Harlem–125th Street station

In December 2020, New York's Metropolitan Transportation Authority (MTA) approved a Federal Transit Administration-funded contract for 19 dual-mode locomotives based on the Charger platform. The locomotives were ordered to replace the existing GE Genesis fleet used on Metro-North Railroad's Hudson Line, Harlem Line, and Danbury Branch. Unlike the GE Genesis P32AC-DM locomotives they replace, which can only operate in electric mode for about 10 minutes due to thermal limitations, the new locomotives are designed for continuous operation using third rail electric power, reducing diesel use in electrified territory.

The contract included options for up to 144 additional locomotives: 40 for Metro-North, 66 for the Long Island Rail Road (LIRR), 20 for the New York State Department of Transportation (NYSDOT) for use on Amtrak's Empire Service, and 25 for the Connecticut Department of Transportation (CTDOT).

Immediately after the contract award, Metro-North exercised options for eight additional locomotives, while CTDOT ordered six units for branch line service. These additional orders increased the total to 33 locomotives and were intended to allow the full replacement of the P32AC-DM fleet while supporting expanded service on the Danbury and Waterbury branches. Delivery of the initial 33 locomotives was expected to be completed in 2027.

The first two locomotives were delivered in October 2024, and the first units entered revenue service in September 2025.

In December 2024, LIRR announced it would exercise its option to purchase 44 additional dual-mode locomotives, intended to replace the aging EMD DE30AC and DM30AC fleet.

On January 24, 2025, Metro-North issued a sole-source procurement notice for up to 16 additional Siemens Charger locomotives for use on the future Penn Station Access service. On February 26, 2025, the MTA Board voted to exercise its option to purchase 13 additional B+AC battery-electric dual-mode locomotives at a cost of $304.9 million. These locomotives are a specialized "B+AC" dual-power battery-electric variant designed to operate in two electric modes: drawing power from overhead AC electrification or from the onboard batteries, eliminating the need for a diesel prime mover. In electrified territory, electricity from the overhead wire will directly power the traction motors while also recharging the locomotive's 3.1-megawatt-hour (11 GJ) battery. Beyond electrified territory, the locomotives will operate on battery power alone, with a range of approximately 100 miles (160 km).

=== Ontario Northland ===
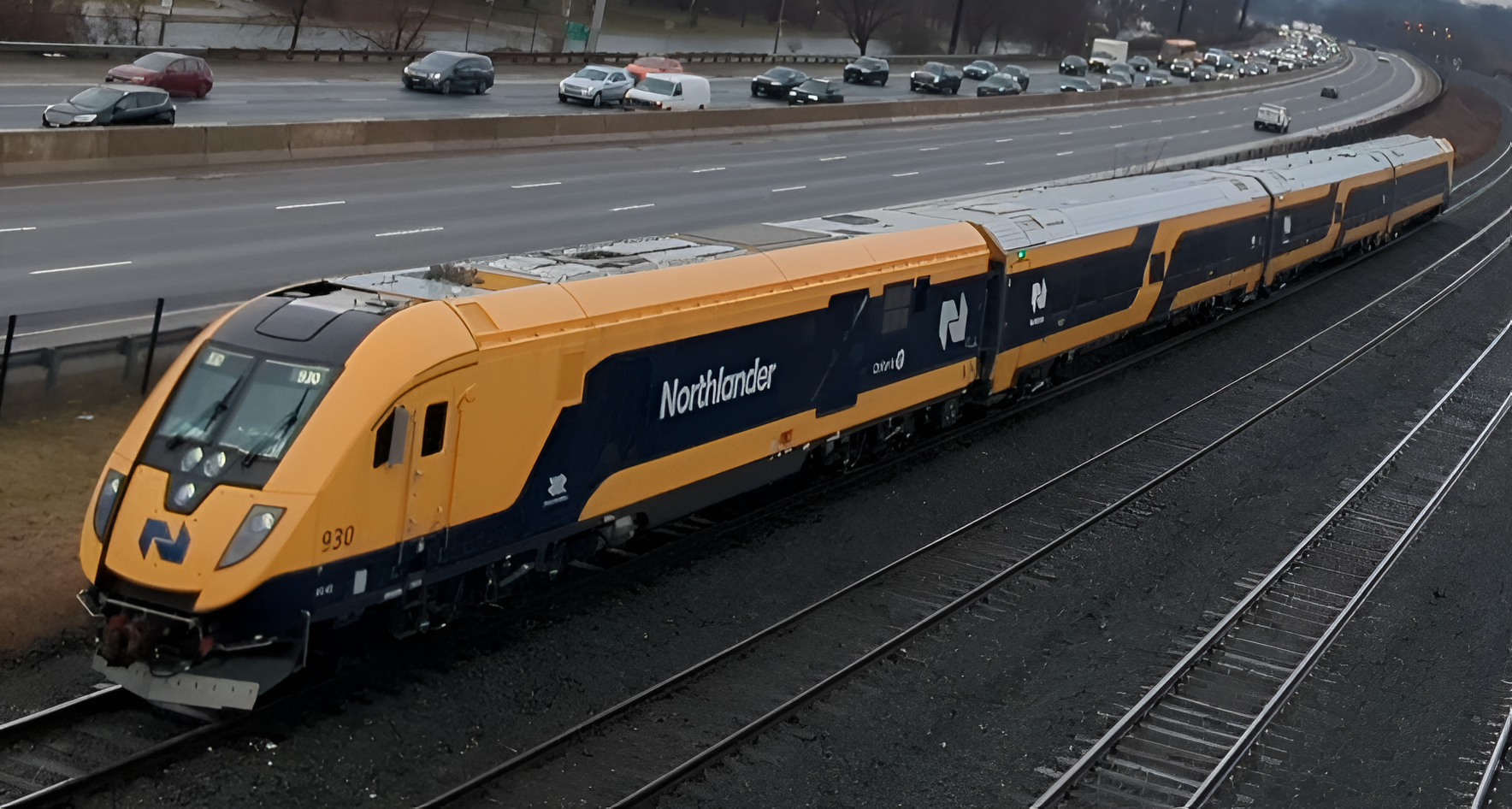
A Northlander train with SC-42 No. 930 and Venture coaches in Toronto

In December 2022, the Government of Ontario and Ontario Northland announced a CA$139.5 million investment to reinstate the Northlander passenger service between Timmins and Toronto. The government news release mentioned that the three new trainsets (each with three Siemens Venture passenger cars) will be built by Siemens Mobility and paired with Charger locomotives that will meet the latest EPA Tier 4 diesel emission standards.

=== Trinity Railway Express ===
In February 2024, five locomotives were purchased for use on the Trinity Railway Express (TRE) commuter rail service operating in the Dallas/Fort Worth area. Delivery of the first locomotives is expected around summer 2026. The five locomotives are intended to replace the oldest units in the existing TRE fleet. TRE has the option to purchase up to six additional locomotives under the contract. These locomotives have been assigned the SCD-42E designation.

=== Via Rail ===
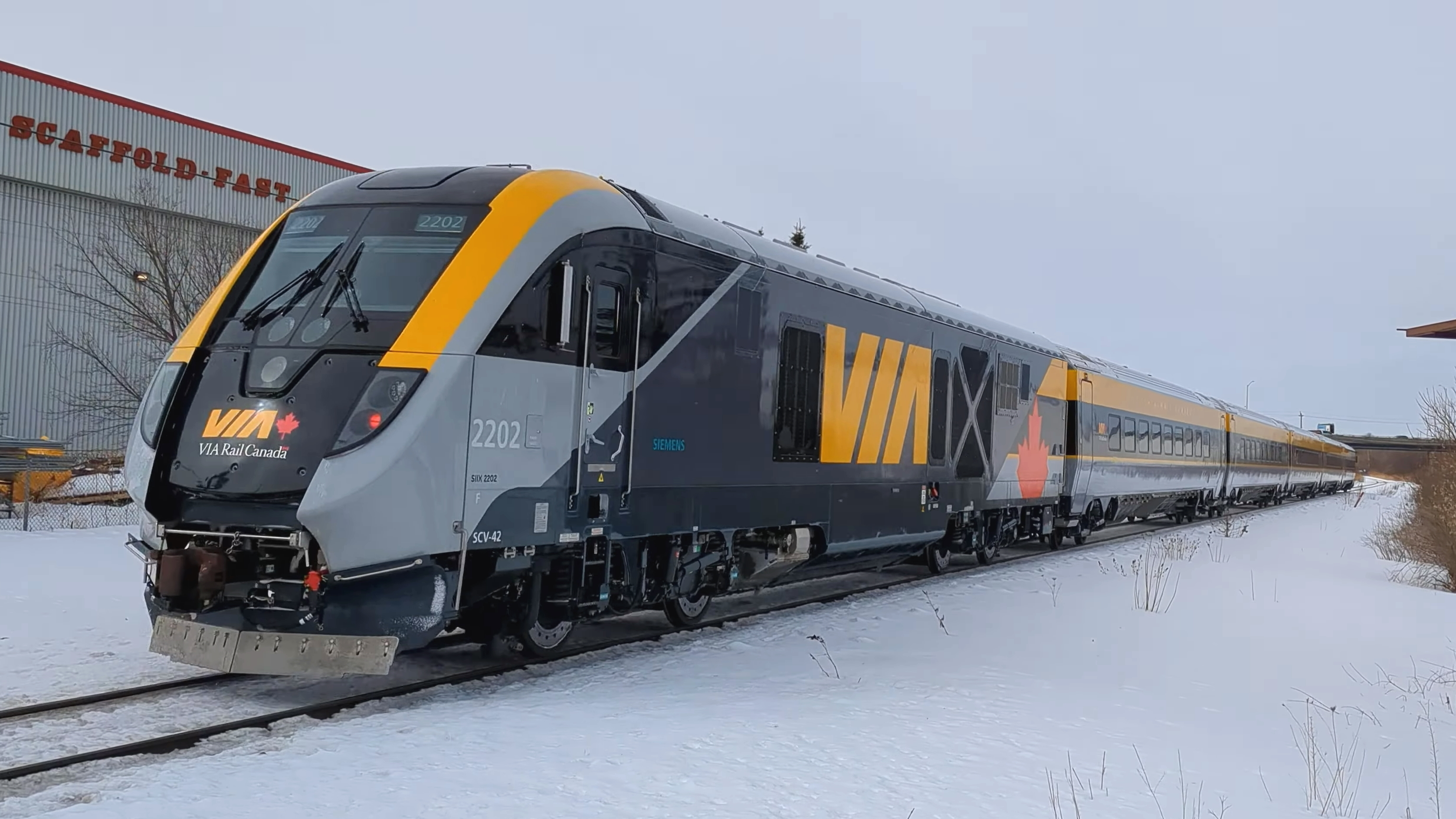
Via Rail SCV-42 No. 2202 and Venture cars in Ottawa

In December 2018, Via Rail ordered 32 bi-directional trainsets each powered by one SC-44 locomotive for use on the Quebec City–Windsor Corridor. As with several other orders, the trainsets use Siemens Venture passenger cars.

The first of Via Rail's trainsets were delivered on September 29, 2021, to Via Rail in Montreal, crossing into Canada via Sarnia, Ontario. When the locomotives' final paint scheme was unveiled by Via Rail in May 2021, the locomotive was designated as an SC-44, but when delivered the locomotives' designation had been changed to SCV-42. The trainsets entered service in 2022.

== See also ==
- EMD F125 – competing Tier 4 passenger locomotive
- MPI MPXpress MP54AC – competing Tier 4 passenger locomotive
