= EMD F125 =

Diesel-electric passenger locomotive model

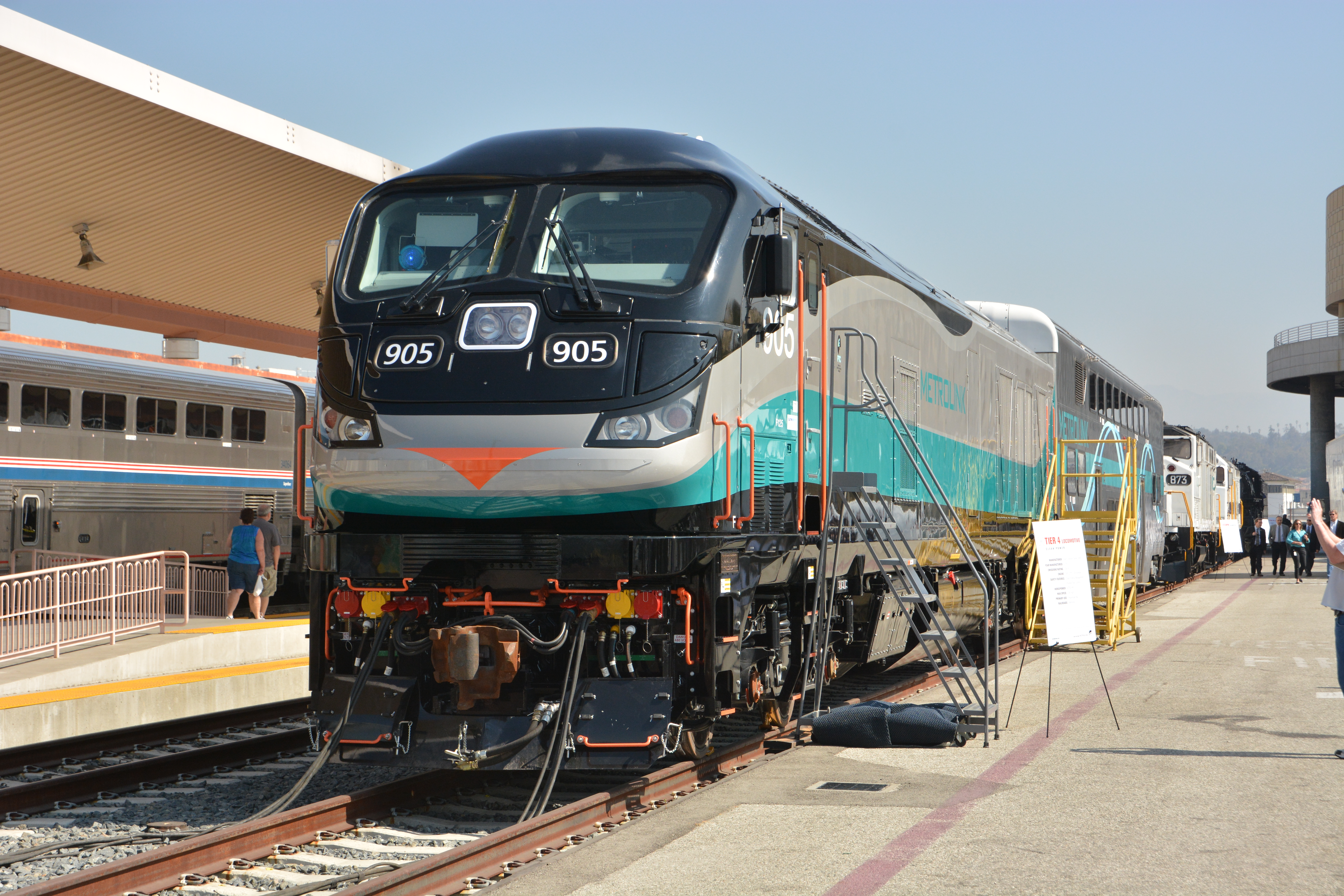
- SCAX 905, the first F125 delivered to Metrolink, on display at Los Angeles Union Station
Type and origin
- Power type: Diesel-electric
- Builder: Electro-Motive Diesel (EMD)
- Model: F125
- Build date: 2015–2021
- Total produced: 40
Specifications
- Configuration
  - AAR: B-B
  - UIC: Bo′Bo′
- Gauge: 4 ft 8 1/2 in (1,435 mm)
- Wheel diameter: 40 in (1,016 mm) (New)
- Minimum curve: 250 ft (76 m) radius/ 23°
- Wheelbase: Locomotive: 42 ft 4 in (12.90 m) (between truck centers); Truck: 9 ft 7 in (2.92 m)
- Length: 69 ft 0 in (21.03 m)
- Width: 10 ft 0 in (3.05 m)
- Height: 14 ft 6 1/2 in (4.432 m)
- Axle load: 71,250 lb (32,318 kg)
- Adhesive weight: 100%
- Loco weight: 285,000 lb (129,274 kg) (Nominal)
- Fuel type: Diesel
- Fuel capacity: 2,350 US gal (8,900 L; 1,960 imp gal)
- Lubricant cap.: 180 US gal (680 L; 150 imp gal)
- Coolant cap.: 291 US gal (1,100 L; 242 imp gal)
- Sandbox cap.: Four boxes @ 6.25 cu ft (177 L) each
- Prime mover: Caterpillar C175-20
- RPM range: 800-1,800
- Engine type: 45° V20, four stroke cycle
- Aspiration: Turbocharged
- Displacement: 105.8 L (6,460 cu in)
- Alternator: Kato AK30-8
- Traction motors: EMD AC Traction Motors, model A2921-5; 1,000 hp (750 kW) each
- Cylinders: 20
- Cylinder size: 5.29 L (323 cu in)
- Transmission: AC-DC-AC
- MU working: Yes
- Train heating: Locomotive supplied Head end power (inverters rated between 600-1000 kW)
- Loco brake: Dynamic / Regenerative / Electropneumatic / Blend Brake
- Safety systems: I-ETMS positive train control
Performance figures
- Maximum speed: 125 mph (201 km/h) (Optional); 100 mph (160 km/h) (79:22 gear ratio)
- Power output: At Alternator: 4,560 hp (3,400 kW); At Wheels: 4,000 hp (3,000 kW) max
- Tractive effort: Starting: 71,000 lbf (316 kN); Continuous: 47,000 lbf (209 kN) @ 32 mph (51 km/h)
- Factor of adh.: 4.014
- Brakeforce: 47,200 lbf (210 kN) from 20 mph (32 km/h) to 1 mph (1.6 km/h)
Career
- Operators: Metrolink (California)
- Number in class: 40
- Numbers: 903–942
- Nicknames: Spirit

The EMD F125 "Spirit" is a four-axle passenger diesel locomotive manufactured by Electro-Motive Diesel (EMD) for the North American market since 2015. It is powered by a Caterpillar C175-20 V20 diesel engine rated at 4,700 hp (3,500 kW). The locomotive is capable of traveling at a maximum in-service speed of 125 mph (201 km/h) pulling consists of up to 10 cars. It was EMD's first new passenger locomotive for the North American market in 15 years, with the most recent predecessor passenger locomotive being the EMD DE30AC and DM30AC built for the Long Island Rail Road. Metrolink is the only customer of the F125.

Features of the F125 include Tier 4 emissions compliance (with exhaust after-treatment), AC traction systems, extended-range blend and dynamic brakes with HEP regeneration capabilities, advanced crash energy management (CEM) technology, and a streamlined body design, designed by Vossloh of Spain.

== History ==
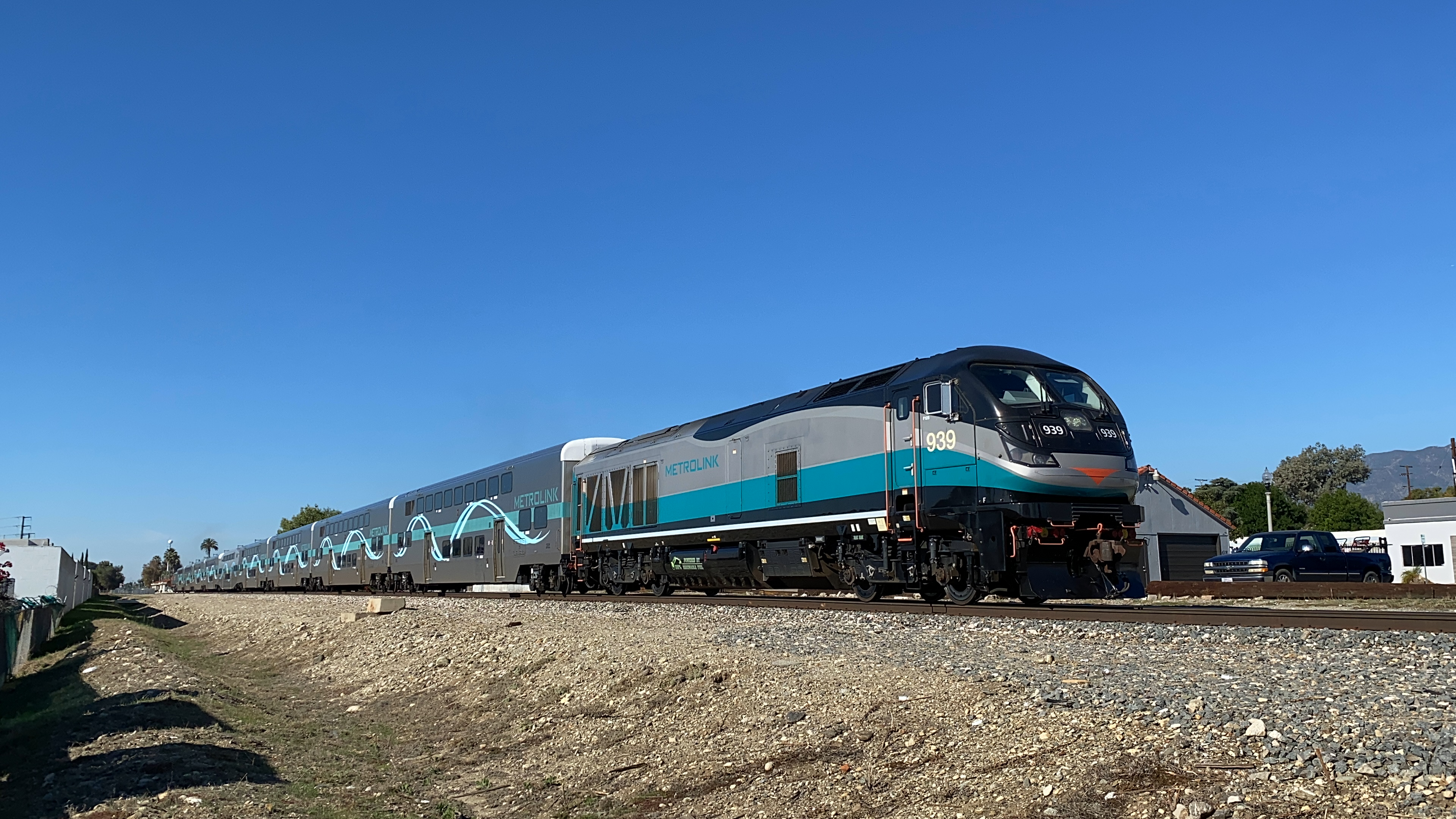
SCAX 939 powers the Metrolink Holiday Express train in Upland, California, in 2023.

The Los Angeles commuter rail agency Metrolink was the launch customer for the EMD F125, with an order for 40. The cost of the base order of 10 units with an option of additional 10 was estimated at $150 million, with delivery commencing in 2016. The base order was signed on May 31, 2013, for 10 locomotives with an option for additional 10, which has since been exercised. Additional orders were exercised as funding became available. They replaced the EMD F59PH and F59PHI.

The first locomotive began testing in the first quarter of 2016 and was shown to the public on July 18, 2016, at Los Angeles Union Station during a special event, and had its first mainline run on June 10, 2017.

The bulk of the order was expected to be delivered by April 2017, but major problems with the locomotives had prevented their full acceptance by Metrolink. In November 2018, Metrolink announced that only five locomotives had been accepted, and the project was two years behind schedule. As of 2022, all F125 locomotives had been delivered to Metrolink and placed in service.

The F125 competes with other Tier 4 compliant locomotives, such as the Siemens Charger series and the MPI MPXpress MP54AC. Both the F125 and MP54AC have struggled to find customers, unlike the Charger series, which has sold more than 450 units including large orders from Amtrak and Via Rail.

In March 2026, Metrolink announced a 20% reduction of its schedule, due to the poor reliability and high maintenance costs of the F125 locomotives.

As of April 2026, EMD no longer lists the F125 for sale on its website.
