= MPI MPXpress =

Line of diesel-electric passenger locomotives

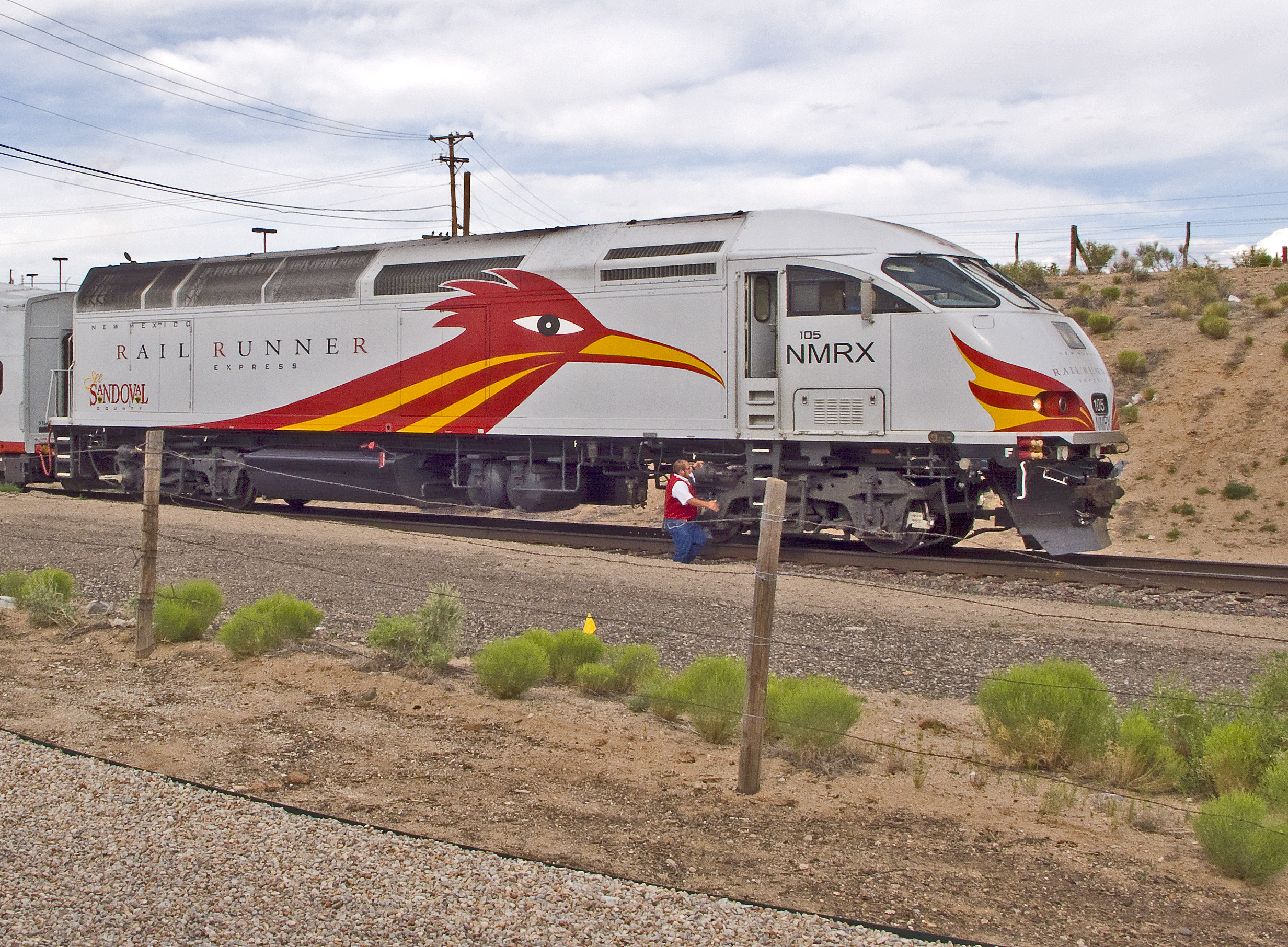
- MP36PH-3C of New Mexico Rail Runner Express
Type and origin
- Power type: Diesel-electric
- Builder: MotivePower
- Build date: 2003–2024
- Total produced: 227: MP36PH-3S: 27; MP36PH-3C: 103; MP40PH-3C: 70; MP32PH-Q: 11; MP54AC: 16
- Number rebuilt: MP36PH-3S: 27 (to MP36PH-3C); MP40PH-3C: 1 (to MP54AC)
Specifications
- Configuration
  - AAR: B-B
  - UIC: Bo'Bo'
- Gauge: 4 ft 8 1/2 in (1,435 mm) standard gauge
- Wheel diameter: 3 ft 4 in (1,020 mm)
- Minimum curve: 248 ft (76,000 mm)
- Wheelbase: 9 ft 0 in (2,740 mm) (original); 9 ft 4 in (2,840 mm) (new)
- Length: 68 ft (20.73 m)
- Width: 10 ft 7.5 in (3,238 mm)
- Height: 15 ft 6 in (4,720 mm)
- Loco weight: 285,000 to 295,000 lb (129,000 to 134,000 kg)
- Prime mover: EMD 16-645F3B (MP36PH-3S, MP36PH-3C); EMD 16-710G3B-T2 (MP40PH-3C); EMD 16-645E3C (MP32PH-Q); (2x) Cummins QSK60 (MP54AC)
Performance figures
- Maximum speed: 82–102 mph (132–164 km/h) (MP36PH-3C, MP32PH-Q); 93 mph (150 km/h) (MP40PH-3C); 110 mph (177 km/h) (MP54AC)
- Power output: 3,600 hp (2,700 kW) (MP36PH-3S, MP36PH-3C); 4,000 hp (3,000 kW) (MP40PH-3C); 5,400 hp (4,000 kW) (MP54AC); 3,200 hp (2,400 kW) (MP32PH-Q)
- Tractive effort: 72,500–85,000 lbf (322–378 kN) (MP36PH-3C, MP36PH-3S); 85,000 lbf (380 kN) (MP40PH-3C); 70,000 lbf (310 kN) (MP32PH-Q); 82,900 lbf (369 kN) (MP54AC)
Career
- Operators: See list

The MPI MPXpress is a line of diesel-electric locomotives built by MotivePower (a subsidiary of Wabtec) for commuter rail service. There are five MPXpress models: MP36PH-3S, MP36PH-3C, MP40PH-3C, MP32PH-Q, and MP54AC.

MPXpress locomotives were built with a high percentage of re-manufactured parts including diesel engines, major electrical components, trucks, and frames. Cabs, fuel tanks, electronics, HEP package, and other replaceable parts such as wheels and couplers were new when delivered. The re-manufactured components kept the price of locomotives down while providing like-new components with full warranty protection. The new cabs also made the MPXpress the first production passenger locomotive that met U.S. federal crashworthiness requirements.

The MPXpress line has kept pace with increasingly stringent EPA locomotive emissions regulations, having provided the first—and in some cases, only—passenger locomotive for each of the four emission levels (tiers) that were specified by the EPA between 2002 and 2015.

While the MPXpress is used by numerous public transit agencies in Canada and the United States—GO Transit has the most, with 93—Wabtec no longer lists the MPXpress in its locomotive portfolio.

== Models ==
=== MP36PH-3S ===
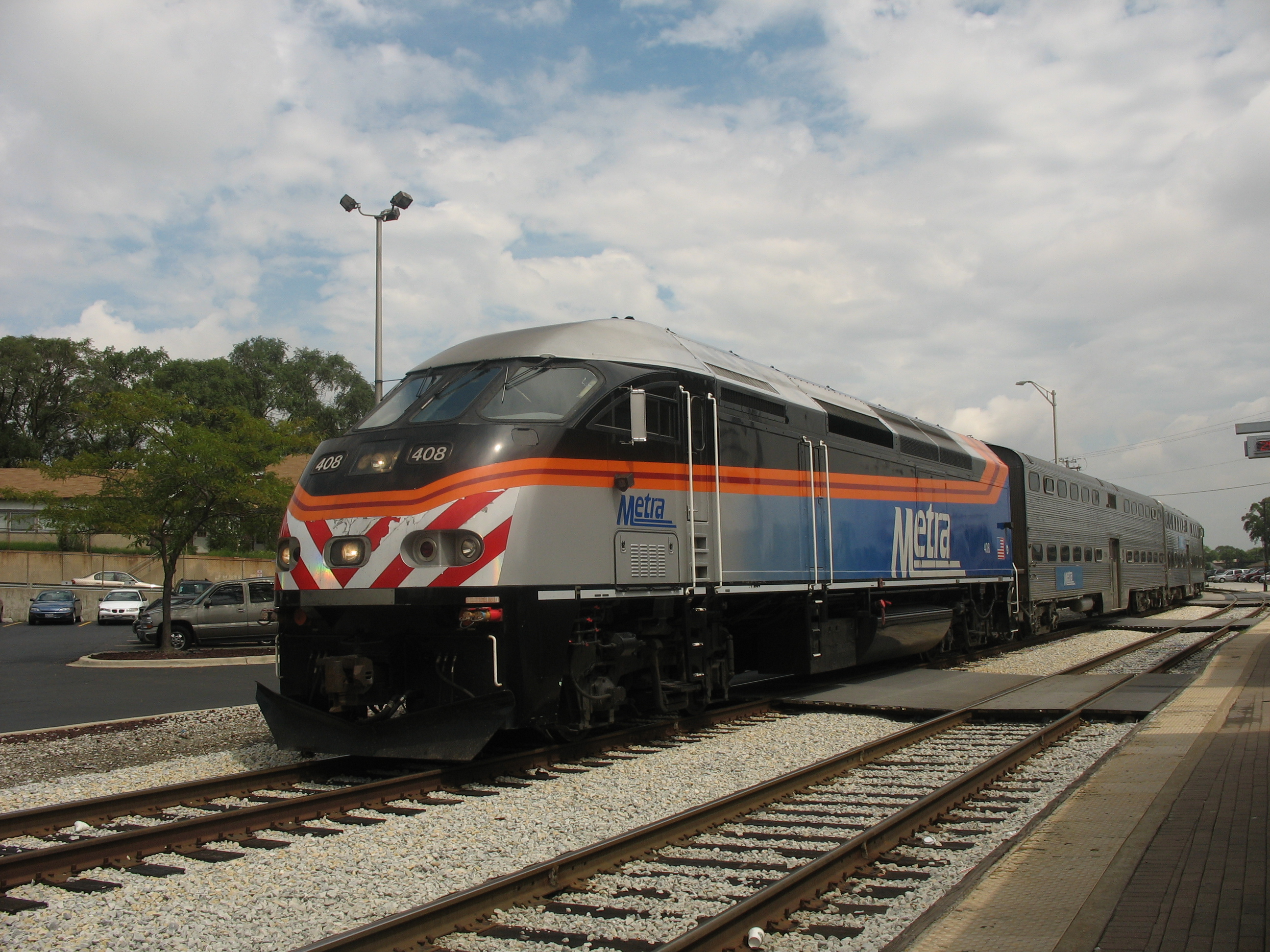
A Metra MP36PH-3S in Blue Island. Metra is the only railroad that ordered this model.

The MP36PH-3S used a 16-cylinder EMD 645F3B diesel engine as its prime mover, capable of generating 3,600 hp. Head-end power (HEP) was generated by a static inverter that received its power through connections to the prime mover (hence the "S" (static) designation). Compared to a locomotive with a separate HEP generator, the prime mover had to constantly maintain a higher RPM in order to supply power to the passenger cars. The setup was simpler but led to higher noise levels and higher fuel consumption.

When providing the maximum 500 kW HEP load, maximum traction power is reduced to 2,930 hp since HEP generation diverts some power from the prime mover.

The MP36PH-3S was the first variety of MPXpress locomotive to be built and the launch customer was Metra, a commuter railroad in the Chicago area. Metra ordered 27 of these locomotives in 2001, which were built and delivered between 2003 and 2004. Fourteen were to replace the railroad's aged F40C fleet, while the rest were for fleet expansion. Until May of 2020, when the 3S variants were converted to 3C's, Metra was the only operator of the MP36PH-3S variant of the MPXpress.

When the locomotives were first delivered, the onboard computer systems proved problematic. At one point in 2004, because Metra had so many MPXpress locomotives out of service, two F40Cs had to be placed back into service for a short time.

==== Conversion to MP36PH-3C specification ====
Starting in 2015, Metra began converting its MP36PH-3S locomotives to the MP36PH-3C specification by removing the static inverter and replacing it with a separate HEP generator. Metra's MP36PH-3C locomotives all have extended radiators to supply the extra cooling for the new Caterpillar generators. Locomotive No. 417 was the first one to be converted and was sent to MPI in Boise. The rest were rebuilt at Metra's 47th Street shops on the South Side of Chicago. As of 2020, all of the MP36PH-3S locomotives have been converted to the MP36PH-3C specification.

=== MP36PH-3C ===
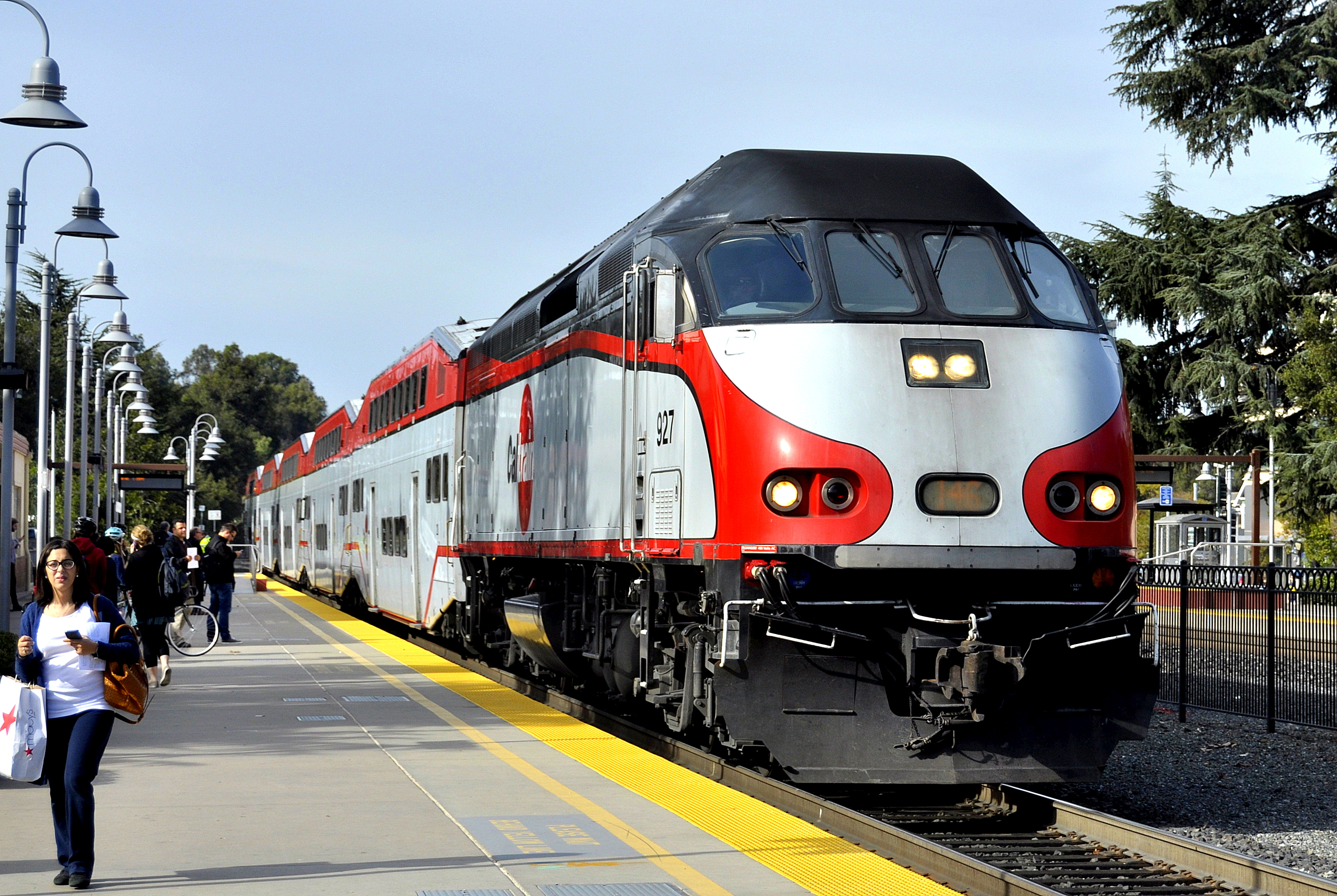
An MP36PH-3C in Caltrain livery. Nine railroads operate this model, with Caltrain being the launch customer.

The MP36PH-3C has the same EMD 645F3B prime mover as the MP36PH-3S model, but with a separate head-end power generator, a Caterpillar C-27 (3412 before 2005).

The launch customer for the MP36PH-3C was Caltrain, a commuter railroad in the San Francisco Bay Area. Caltrain ordered 6 of these locomotives in 2003, which were built and delivered that same year. This locomotive has gone on to become the most popular MPXpress variant, with 100 delivered to nine different customers.

=== MP40PH-3C ===
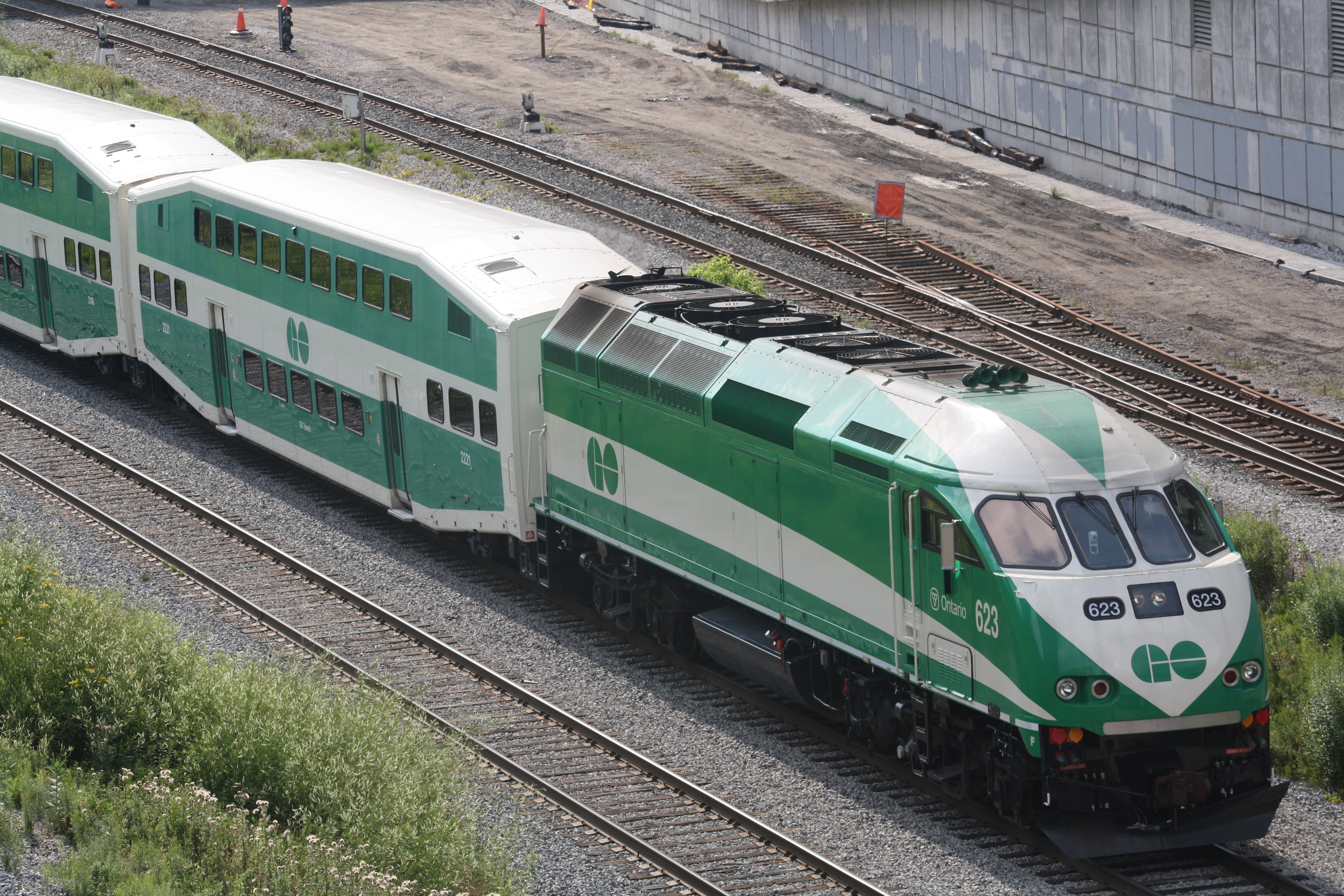
An MP40PH-3C in the old GO Transit livery. GO Transit and Sounder Commuter Rail operate this model.

The MP40PH-3C introduced a new prime mover, the larger 16-cylinder EMD 710G3B series diesel engine, capable of generating 4,000 hp. The MP40PH-3C also uses an EMD alternator and traction motors.

The launch customer for the MP40PH-3C was GO Transit, a commuter railroad in the GTHA (Greater Toronto and Hamilton Area). The MP40PH-3C was developed in response to a bid request from GO Transit for locomotives capable of generating 4,000 hp, hauling 12 passenger cars and traveling at speeds up to 93 mph (150 km/h). MotivePower and GE Transportation responded to the request, with MotivePower being selected as the winning bidder. GO Transit placed an order for 27 locomotives in 2006, which were built and delivered between 2007 and 2008.

In 2011, MotivePower upgraded the MP40PH-3C to comply with the EPA's more stringent Tier 3 emissions standard, which was in effect between 2012 and 2014. Three locomotives meeting this standard were built, all delivered to Sounder commuter rail in the Seattle area. Ten additional locomotives for GO Transit are also Tier 3 compliant.

=== MP32PH-Q ===
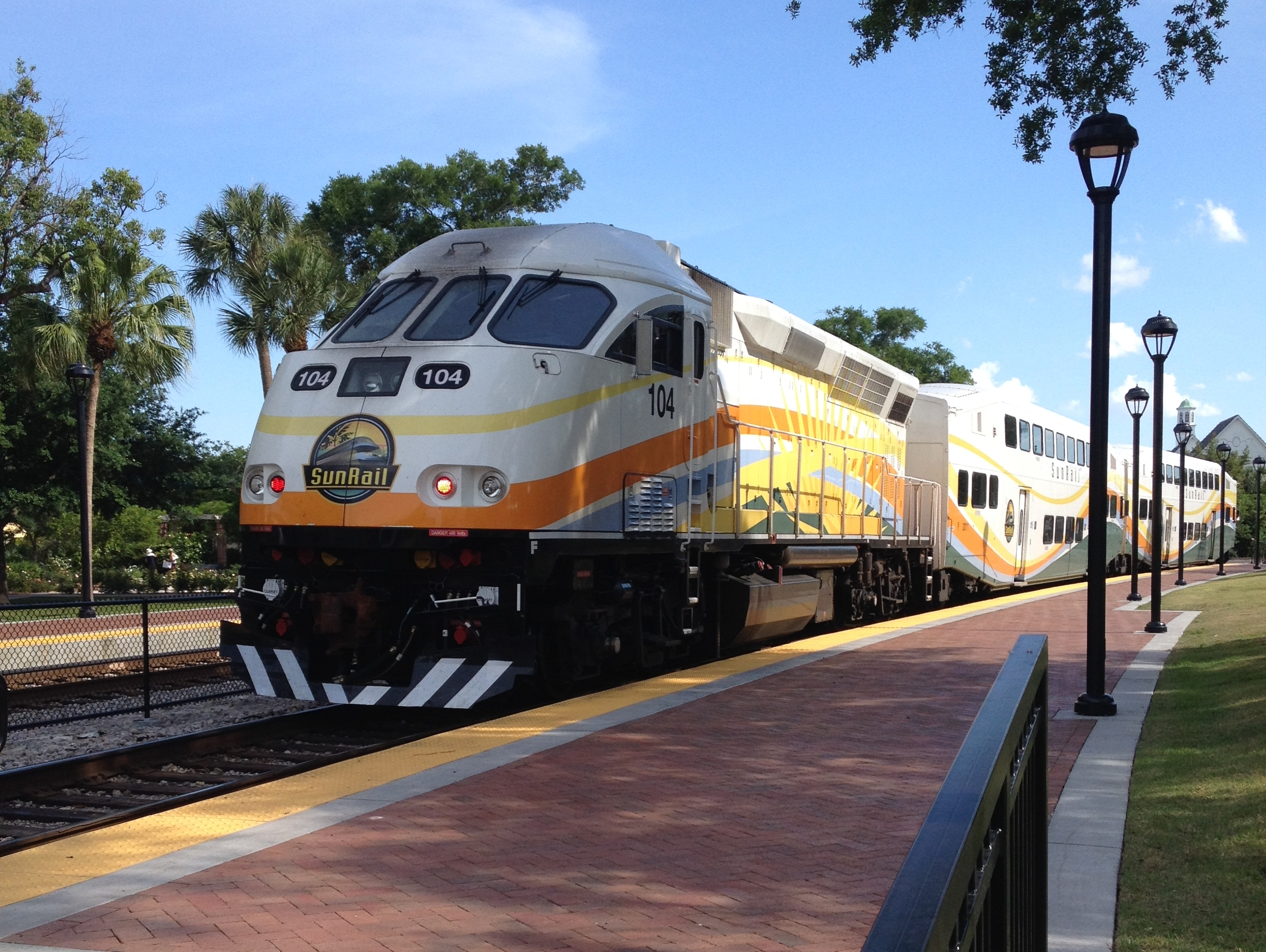
An MPI MP32PH-Q locomotive in SunRail livery. Sunrail is the only operator of the MP32PH-Q.

The MP32PH-Q was built from 2013 to 2017 for SunRail. They have similar specifications as new MPXpress locomotives, but are rebuilt and refurbished from units that had previously operated on MARC as GP40WH-2 locomotives. Inside the locomotive, the EMD 16-645E3C prime mover has been rebuilt and is rated at 3,200 horsepower. Electronics were upgraded using similar systems to those found on other MPXpress locomotives. On the exterior, the MP32PH-Q retains the hood unit layout of the former GP40WH-2, but a new four-window MPXpress cab replaces the original cab.

=== MP54AC ===
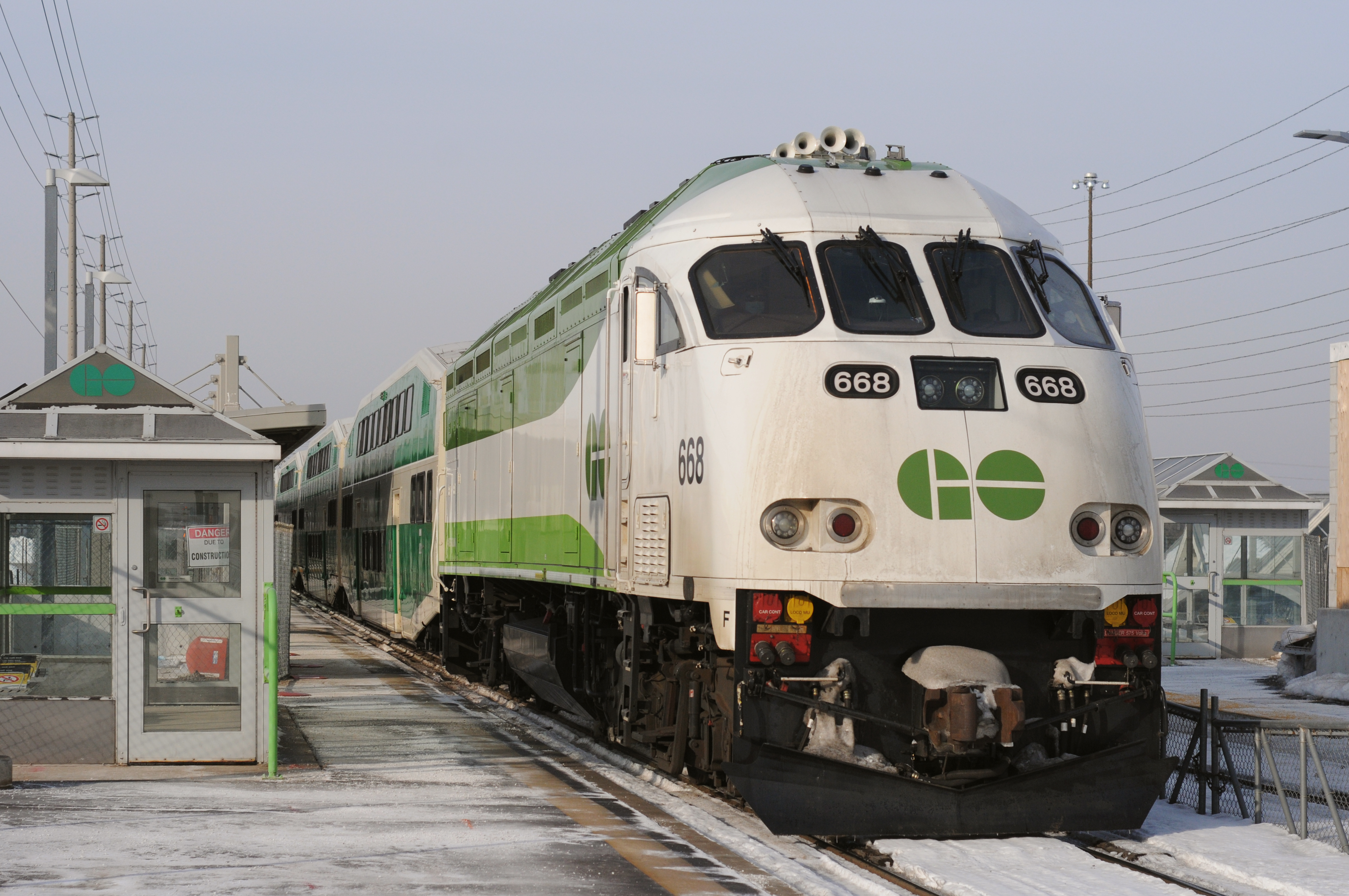
An MPI MP54AC locomotive in the new GO Transit livery. GO Transit is currently the only operator of this model.

The MP54AC (also known as MP40PHTC-T4AC) is the latest locomotive in the MPXpress family and the only model available for sale in the US. It is designed to both meet the EPA's stringent Tier 4 emissions standard and offer higher performance than the MP40PH-3C. The MP54AC is a genset locomotive, using a pair of Cummins QSK60 60-liter, 16-cylinder engines rated at 2,700 hp each (5,400 hp total) and during periods of low power demand, the locomotive can operate on just one engine to reduce noise pollution and boost fuel efficiency. The 5,400 total horsepower qualifies the MP54AC as the most powerful diesel-electric passenger locomotive in North America, both currently and historically.

Currently, the MP54AC can be built as new or by having existing MPXpress locomotives rebuilt to the standard.

GO Transit was the launch customer for the MP54AC. The first prototype unit was built by converting a MP40PH-3C owned by GO Transit (unit 647). MotivePower removed the EMD prime mover and HEP motor and replaced them with the twin Cummins engines. Heavy modifications were made to the body to accommodate extra air intake and exhaust stacks. Unit 647 was delivered to GO Transit late 2015 and was seen under testing on December 12, 2015.

Initially GO Transit had planned to convert a total of ten MP40PH-3Cs to the new MP54AC standard; it later ordered 16 additional newly built MP54AC locomotives instead.

The MP54AC is one of three Tier 4 compliant passenger locomotives, along with the Siemens Charger series and the EMD F125. While the MP54AC and F125 have struggled to find customers, the Charger series has sold more than 450 units including large orders from Amtrak and Via Rail.

== Operators ==
Railroad	Model	Qty.	Notes
Caltrain	MP36PH-3C	6	MP36PH-3C launch customer
FrontRunner	MP36PH-3C	18	One unit sold to Northstar Line; two units sold to MBTA
GO Transit	MP40PH-3C	67	One converted to an MP54AC
GO Transit	MP54AC	16	One converted from MP40PH-3C
MARC	MP36PH-3C	26	
Metrolink	MP36PH-3C	15	
MBTA Commuter Rail	MP36PH-3C	2	Purchased from FrontRunner
Metra	MP36PH-3S	27	Later converted to MP36PH-3C standard
New Mexico Rail Runner Express	MP36PH-3C	9	
Northstar Line	MP36PH-3C	6	Unit 512 purchased from FrontRunner, railroad now defunct
Sounder	MP40PH-3C	3	Later rebuilt with lower-emission (Tier 3) engine.
SunRail	MP32PH-Q	11	
Virginia Railway Express	MP36PH-3C	20	
West Coast Express	MP36PH-3C	1	
Total		227	

== Internal layout ==
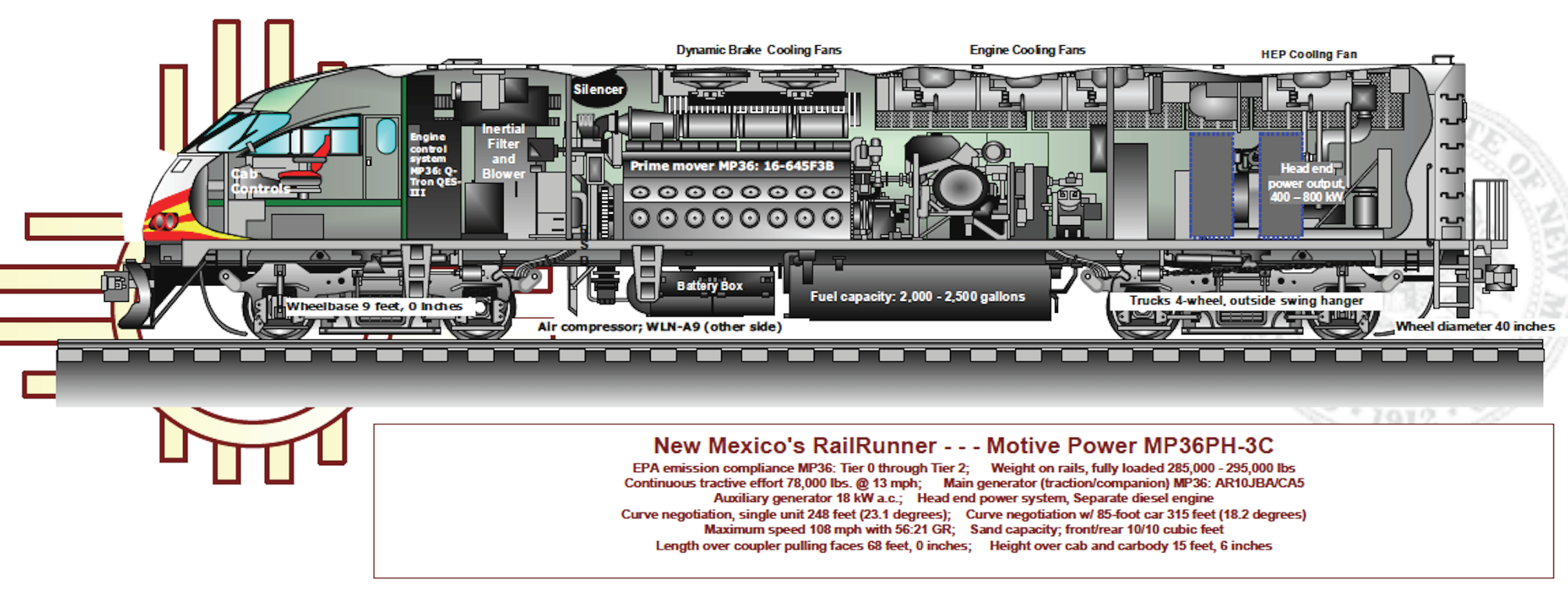
Cutaway drawing of New Mexico's RailRunner MPI MP36PH-3C. This layout varies for other locomotives.
