= Mercedes-Benz F125 =

Electrically driven, hydrogen fuel cell concept car

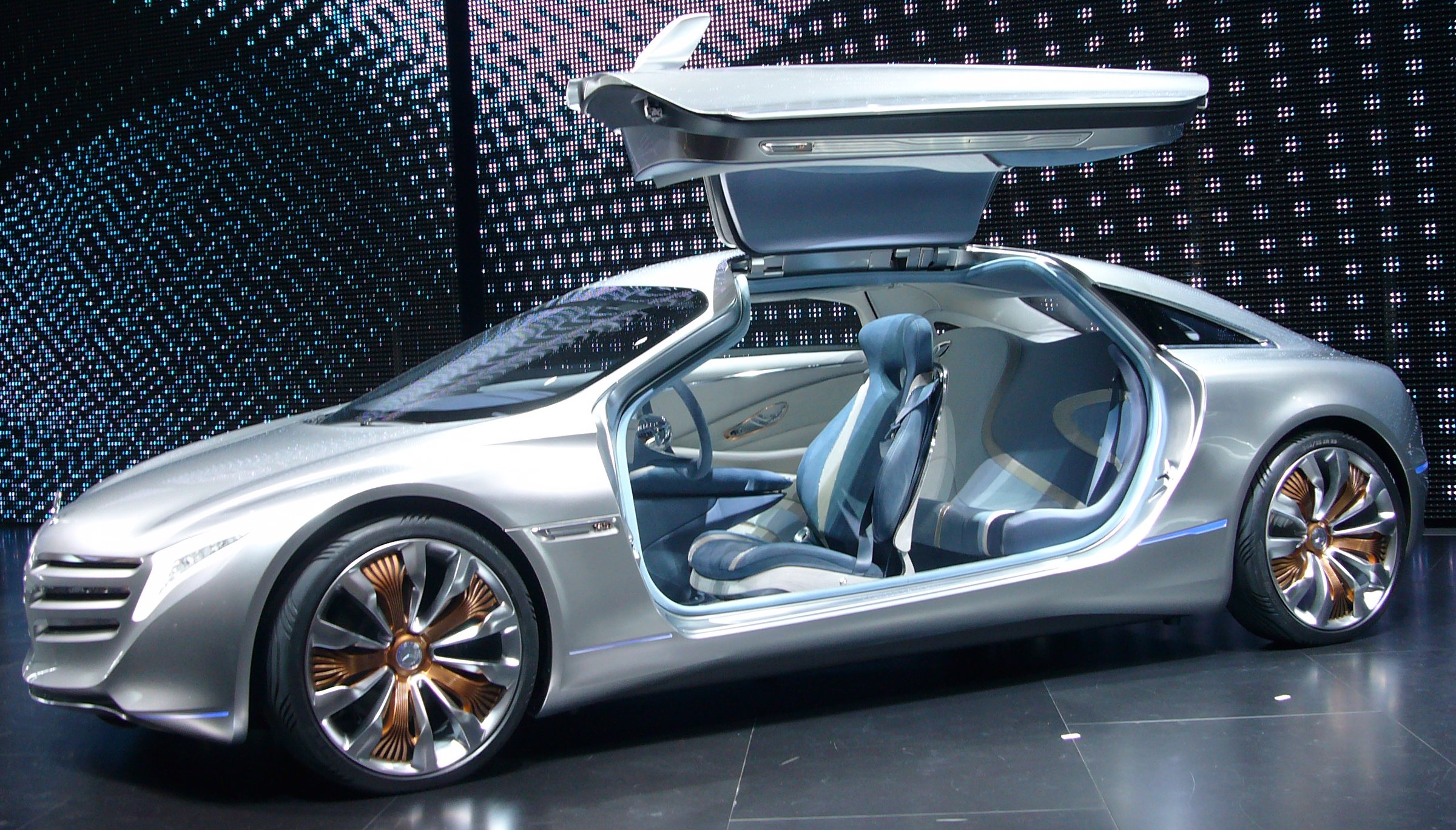

Overview
- Manufacturer: Daimler AG
- Production: 2011 (concept car)
- Designer: Gorden Wagener; Michele Jauch Paganetti; Steffen Koehl; Robert Samson

Body and chassis
- Class: Grand tourer (S)
- Body style: Two-door coupé
- Layout: Front-engine, all-wheel-drive
- Doors: Gull-wing

Powertrain
- Engine: Fuel cell-powered
- Electric motor: 308 bhp (230 kW; 312 PS) wheel-mounted electric motors
- Transmission: 1-speed
- Hybrid drivetrain: Fuel-cell PHEV (F-CELL Plug-in HYBRID)
- Battery: 10-kWh Lithium-Sulpher (Li–S)

Dimensions
- Wheelbase: 131 in (3.33 m)
- Length: 197 in (5.00 m)
- Width: 78 in (1.98 m)
- Height: 56 in (1.42 m)

The Mercedes-Benz F125 (stylized as the Mercedes-Benz F 125! ) is an electrically driven, hydrogen fuel cell concept car unveiled at the 2011 Frankfurt Motor Show. It is named 125 to celebrate the 125th anniversary of Mercedes-Benz.

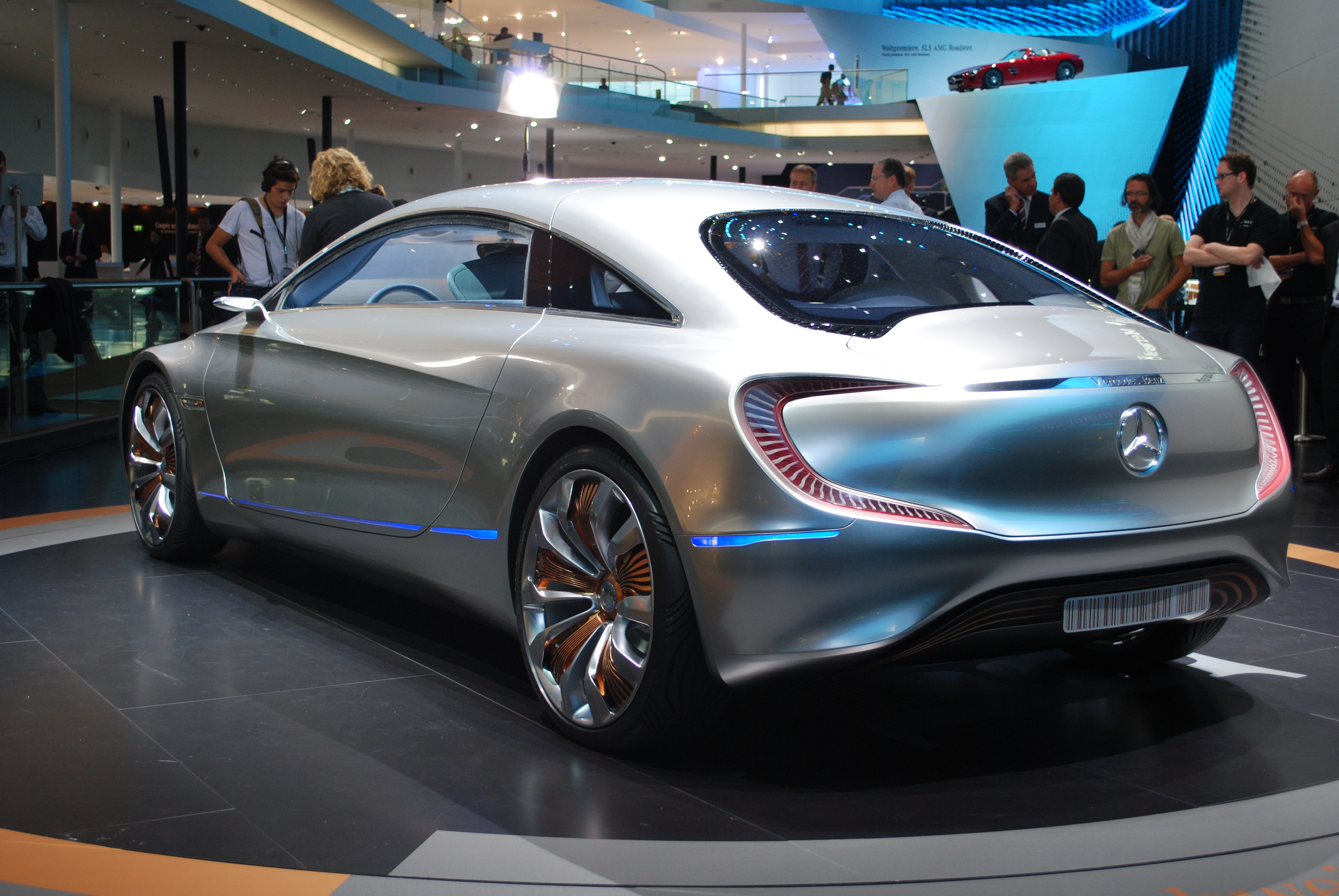
Mercedes-Benz F125 rear

The 197-inch-long (5.00 m) two-door coupé has front gullwing doors that provide access to the front and rear seats.

Each wheel is powered by an electric motor, creating a rear-drive biased four-wheel drive "e4MATIC" system. The front motors provide 67 bhp (50 kW; 68 PS) and the rear 134 bhp (100 kW; 136 PS) with a total peak of 308 bhp (230 kW; 312 PS); the electric motors are powered by a 10-kWh capacity lithium-sulfur battery located in a vertical position behind the rear seats. The batteries are provided energy by a hydrogen fuel cell located between the front wheels.

The F125 has a claimed acceleration time to 100 km/h in 4.9 seconds and a top speed of 220 km/h.
