= List of rail accidents in the United Kingdom =

This lists significant accidents involving railway infrastructure or rolling stock, including crashes, fires and incidents of crew being overcome by locomotive emissions. Indirect railway-related incidents such as the King's Cross fire of 1987 or the 7 July 2005 London bombings are not included. Deaths by suicide in which no other people were casualties are also not included.

== Worst accidents ==
The worst accident was the Quintinshill rail disaster in Scotland in 1915 with 226 dead and 246 injured. (Note: This total comprises 214 soldiers on the troop train, 9 passengers from the 2 passenger trains, 3 railway staff and 4 children, believed to be stowaways on the troop train. Col Druitt's official report into the accident gives the figure as 227 (he did not include the 4 children), but he compiled the report very soon after the accident and gave the number of troops killed as 215 which was later revised downwards by the army to 214, the figure which appears on the memorial in the Rosebank Cemetery in Edinburgh.) The second worst, and the worst in England's peacetime history, was the 1952 Harrow and Wealdstone rail crash, which killed 112 people and injured 340. The death toll from the 1957 Lewisham rail crash was 90; for the 1889 Armagh rail disaster (the worst in Northern Ireland) it was 80; and for the 1879 Tay Bridge disaster it was 75. The worst rail accident in Wales was the 1868 Abergele rail disaster, with 33 dead.

The accident on the London Underground with the highest loss of life was the Moorgate tube crash which occurred on the Northern City Line in 1975 (which was at the time part of the London Underground network), in which 43 died.

== Mainline rail ==
=== Before 1830 ===
Date	Killed	Injured	Type	Details
31 July 1815	16		boiler explosion	1815 Philadelphia train accident, a boiler explosion of "Brunton's Mechanical Traveller" on a plateway killed 16 people, mainly sightseers.

=== 1830–1922: Pre-grouping ===
Date	Killed	Injured	Type	Details
15 September 1830	1	0	Collision with person on track	Parkside: William Huskisson was fatally injured at the opening of the Liverpool and Manchester Railway when he was hit by Stephenson's Rocket. Huskisson is often reported as the first railway fatality, including in ordinarily reliable sources. This is untrue; at least two people were killed on the Liverpool and Manchester Railway before it opened to the public. The earliest recorded fatality caused by a steam locomotive was an unnamed woman, described as "a blind American beggar", fatally injured by a train on the Stockton and Darlington Railway on 5 March 1827.
April 1831			Signalling error	Newton Junction: PC Bates of the Liverpool and Manchester railway police force caused an accident when he failed to change a set of points when asleep at his post; fined £3 by magistrates (equivalent to £270 in 2025).
4 May 1833			Level crossing collision	Bagworth: Collision with farmer's cart on level crossing, led to the implementation of the locomotive whistle.
3 December 1836	3		Derailment due to signalling error	Wetheral train accident: Train on the Newcastle and Carlisle Railway wrongly diverted into a siding at Wetheral, near Carlisle, Cumbria. The train derailed and crushed three people to death.
7 August 1840	5		Derailment	Howden rail crash, East Riding: Large casting fell from wagon and derailed coaches.
25 October 1840	1	4	Train overruning line end	Faringdon Road, Berkshire: Driver asleep at controls.
10 November 1840	2		Boiler explosion	Bromsgrove, Worcestershire: Boiler explosion.
24 December 1841	8	17	Landslip in cutting (collision with)	Railway accident at Sonning Cutting: Train ran into landslide caused by heavy rain.
2 April 1842	4		Tunnel collapse	Wallers Ash tunnel collapse: A section of the 458-metre-long (1,503 ft) Wallers' Ash railway tunnel in Hampshire collapsed.
6 January 1843	1	1	Rear-end collision	Barnsley railway station, North Midland Railway: Luggage train ran into back of Leeds train in fog. "All carriages were smashed to pieces", the head of the only passenger was "cut completely off".
29 March 1844	1		Rear-end collision	Clay Cross Tunnel accident. The driver of a train died as a result of a rear-end collision, which operated with a timed safety system.
5 October 1844	0	23	Rear-end collision	Anerley. Train ran into rear of train in front after signaller's error.
8 October 1844	2		Multiple collision	West Harton rail accident. Multiple collision between two trains and a group of parked carriages in West Harton, South Shields, England. The collision occurred due to the train protection systems that were still very imperfect at the time.
November 1844	2	15	Head-on collision	Beeston, Nottinghamshire. 2 trains collided head-on in heavy fog.
6 October 1845	0	1	Derailment	Penistone: Train derailed by cow.
20 January 1846	1	1	Bridge collapse	Penshurst bridge collapse. A railway bridge between Penshurst and Tonbridge, Kent, collapsed into River Medway when a train was passing over it. The locomotive driver was rescued, but subsequently died. This is the first known railway accident due to a bridge collapse.
24 May 1847	5	9	Bridge failure	Dee bridge disaster: Bridge collapsed into the river at Chester.
24 May 1847	2		Derailment	Southall: Broken locomotive tyre.
5 June 1847	7		Signalling error	Wolverton. Down mail train was switched into sidings in error by signalman where it collided with coal wagons.
10 May 1848	6	13		Shrivenham, Berkshire: Express struck horse-box and cattle-van.
10 February 1849	5			Rockcliffe, Cumbria. Axle failure resulted in derailment and carriages falling down an embankment.
27 June 1849	1			Hemerdon: The boiler of the engine 'Goliah' exploded.
1 August 1850	5	10		Cowlairs, Glasgow. A crowded early morning train passed a signal at danger then stopped before being hit from behind by another train.
30 April 1851	9	30–40		Sutton Tunnel railway accident, Cheshire: Two inadequately-powered trains struggling together to climb gradient in tunnel ran into by third following train due to miscalculations by Executive Committee and staff.
6 June 1851	5	1?		Falmer, Sussex: Train ran down incline without braking derailed by wooden sleeper obstructing track; engine, tender and two coaches ended up on nearby public highway.
6 September 1851	6			Bicester, Oxfordshire: Points were moved under the train by signalman resulting in derailment.
5 February 1852	0	0		Reading, Berkshire: Confusion over signals led to collision between express train and goods train at the junction of the Berks & Hants Branch line.
13 March 1852	2			Basingstoke rail accident: Tyre failure. Driver and fireman killed.
12 July 1852	4	a great number		Burnley Thorneybank, Lancashire.
20 October 1852	0	6		Aynho, Northamptonshire: A special service from Paddington to Birmingham, for the opening of the new line to Birmingham by the GWR loaded with directors of the Railway, ran into the rear end of a slow running Mixed Goods train at Aynho Station. When the driver of the mixed goods saw the special coming at a speed towards the station attempted to pull away. The coupling to the engine broke so its train was left behind. The locomotive "Lord of the Isles" destroyed the rear truck of the Mixed goods and was derailed by a broken axle. The undamaged carriages then struck the tender of the mixed goods locomotive. The mixed goods pulled the rest of its undamaged train to Banbury before returning to take the damaged special to Leamington because the relief engine sent to rescue the special derailed on the way from Birmingham.
4 March 1853	6			Dixon Fold: Derailment on deteriorated track.
6 March 1853	6	Unknown	Boiler explosion	Longsight station, Manchester. Corrosion in the locomotive firebox due to inadequate inspections and maintenance resulted in a boiler explosion.
9 March 1853	2			Mangotsfield: A mail train had stopped to allow an adjustment to the locomotive when another train crashed into it in dense fog at 25 mph (40 km/h). Two passengers were killed, with the deaths attributed to neglect of duty by the mail train's guard.
5 October 1853	18	Unknown		Straffan rail accident, County Kildare, Ireland: Collision of goods train into rear of stationary passenger train.
21 August 1854	3	11	Collision	1854 Croydon rail accident. An excursion train ran into a locomotive taking water. The locomotive of the excursion train and its following brake van derailed and were thrown off the curve. The following carriages telescoped into each other.
12 September 1855	7	7		Reading: Head-on collision between light engine running on wrong line and passenger train.
18 September 1855	3	0		Dinting Viaduct, Manchester, Sheffield and Lincolnshire Railway: Passenger train waiting to enter Dinting Station had to wait for the train ahead to clear, and drew up on the viaduct. The viaduct parapets were of similar height to station platforms and three passengers, believing that they had arrived, stepped from the carriages and fell to their deaths.
27 September 1855	1	9		Summerseat, north of Bury, Lancashire: Accrington-to-Bury passenger train runs into stationary goods train due to faulty signal.
4 August 1856	3	9		Stubbins, north of Ramsbottom, Lancashire: Northbound passenger train derails and overturns due to poorly installed temporary level-crossing.
6 October 1856	2	1	buffer stop collision	Salisbury A crash resulted in 2 deaths and 1 injury and a complete damaged train.
28 June 1857	11	30		Lewisham rail crash (1857), South London: two trains collided
23 August 1858	14	50		Round Oak rail accident: Rear part of train broke away and ran back down line, collision with following train. 170 persons applied for compensation because "of injury to their persons or their clothes".
16 June 1859	0	0		Virginia Water, Surrey. Special train from Ascot ran into the back of another special train.
16 July 1859	1	79		Bishopton, Renfrewshire: Two passenger trains collide in a tunnel at Bishopton.
16 September 1859	0	7		Staines, Surrey. Signal passed at danger resulted in collision between 2 trains.
20 February 1860	7	9		Tottenham station: Locomotive wheel failure led to derailment and collision with station platform.
4 September 1860	11	77		Helmshore rail accident, Lancashire: Rear portion of passenger excursion train became detached and ran back down line where it collided with an on-coming passenger train.
16 November 1860	10			Atherstone rail accident. The Duke and Duchess of Montrose were passengers.
11 June 1861	2			Wooton Bridge Collapse: Freight train, cast iron girders broke.
25 August 1861	23	176		Clayton Tunnel rail crash: Train hit stationary train in tunnel, confusion over signalling.
2 September 1861	16			Kentish Town rail accident: Signalman's error: engineering ballast train draws out of siding into path of passenger train.
23 September 1861	0	12		Mangotsfield: A goods train shunted into sidings broke down while crossing the track, and was subsequently hit by an excursion train.
6 December 1861	1			Portswood rail accident.
13 October 1862	17			Winchburgh rail crash: Collision in deep cutting.
3 August 1863	7			King's Lynn: Derailment.
7 June 1864	7			Egham: A special train passed a signal at danger and collided with the train in front.
11 October 1864	0	unknown		Putney. A passenger train collided with a goods train due to passing an unlit signal at danger.
14 December 1864	5			Blackheath Tunnel.
7 June 1865	11	30		Rednal rail crash: Excursion train failed to see warning flag for track maintenance.
9 June 1865	10	49		Staplehurst rail crash: Train ran over bridge where rails removed for work. Charles Dickens was a passenger.
9 June 1866	2	2		Welwyn Tunnel rail crash: Collision and fire in tunnel.
26 February 1867	2			Yanwath: Collision of goods trains, one carrying gunpowder; subsequent explosion.
29 June 1867	8	33	Rear-end collision	Warrington rail crash.
20 August 1868	33			Abergele train disaster:
18 December 1869		4		Dalton Junction rail crash; axle break derails Night Mail.
9 October 1869	7			Long Eaton: Collision.
20 June 1870	18			Newark rail crash: Excursion and freight train collided.
10 July 1870	5	29		St Nicholas Crossing, south of Carlisle Citadel: Freight train runs into side of up LNWR mail train on level junction.
14 September 1870	3	13		Tamworth rail crash: Signalman's error diverted Irish Mail into siding where it crashed into river.
28 October 1870	1	0		Bishopstoke collision: Stoker Edward Bist aged 24, Cattle Train heavy, wet rails, took longer to stop.
26 November 1870	7			Harrow: Signal overrun in fog.
6 December 1870	5	57		Brockley Whins.
12 December 1870	15	59		Stairfoot rail accident: Train divided.
26 December 1870	8	3	Wheel failure	Hatfield rail crash (1870): Coach wheel failure caused train separation.
5 September 1871	0	30		Reading, Berkshire: Signalman's error results in passenger train colliding with goods wagons.
21 February 1872	2			Whiteball Tunnel. The two packers had incautiously gone up the tunnel on a trolley and were overtaken by the engine.
20 July 1872	0	0		Reading, Berkshire: Coupling failure resulted in mail train colliding with goods train in fog.
2 October 1872	12			Kirtlebridge rail crash. Collision.
2 August 1873	13	30		Wigan rail crash. Facing points moved under train.
2 December 1873	1			Menheniot: Head-on collision on single line. Misunderstood signalman's verbal order.
27 January 1874	16			Bo'ness Junction rail crash: Express and mineral trains collide.
10 September 1874	25	73		Thorpe rail accident: Head-on collision on single-track line.
24 December 1874	34	69		Shipton-on-Cherwell train crash: Coach tyre broke, derailed train on bridge over canal.
28 August 1875	7	40		Kildwick and Cross Hills rail crash.
21 January 1876	14			Abbots Ripton rail disaster: Rear-end collision. Snow stuck slotted signals in clear position.
7 August 1876	15			Radstock rail accident: Head-on collision on single track. Inadequate infrastructure and unqualified staff overloaded by holiday traffic.
23 November 1876		6		Heeley, West Riding: St Pancras-to-Carlisle train derailed at 60 mph (97 km/h).
23 December 1876	5			Arlesey, Bedfordshire: Passenger train struck derailed goods train.
25 March 1877	5	17		Morpeth 1877: Kings Cross-to-Edinburgh train derailed on curve at 25 mph (40 km/h).
19 October 1878	13			Pontypridd station: Collision.
28 December 1879	75 estimate	0		Tay Bridge disaster. Bridge collapsed under train in a gale.
15 January 1880	5–9	n/k		Burscough Junction Station Crash, Lancashire.
11 August 1880	8			Wennington Junction rail crash: Derailment.
8 August 1881	7	67		Blackburn: Collision
27 November 1882	5			Inverythan crash: Bridge collapsed under train.
8 December 1882	0	2		Penistone station: Accident during shunting.
14 May 1883	7	300		Collision at Lockerbie, Dumfriesshire: train from Stranraer on the Dumfries, Lochmaben and Lockerbie Railway passed a signal and collided at low speed with an empty goods train on the Caledonian Main Line north of Lockerbie. Goods train's wagons derailed and southbound express collided with them.
3 June 1884	4	41		Downton, Wiltshire: Derailment caused by excessive speed over poor quality track.
7 June 1884	4	0		Sevenoaks, Kent: Two freight trains collided. Trains worked under time interval system.
16 July 1884	24	60		Penistone (Bullhouse Bridge) rail accident: Engine broke axle, derailed, train fell off embankment.
14 August 1884	0	2		Staines, Middlesex. Special train from Windsor ran into back of empty train due to excessive speed and passing a signal at danger.
1 January 1885	4	18		Penistone (Barnsley Junction): Axle on wagon of coal train broke and vehicle derailed into side of passing excursion train, destroying one carriage and damaging three.
30 August 1886	0	3		Mangotsfield: A goods train was shunting onto the mainline and hit the side of a passing excursion train, causing significant damage to the guard's van and head injuries to the guard.
1 September 1886	0	20		Penistone: Engine hit train too hard when backing onto it to couple up.
16 September 1887	25	94		Hexthorpe rail accident: Express ran into stationary race train.
7 February 1888	1	11		Hoylake, Cheshire: Collision between trains going in opposite directions.
30 March 1889	1	many		Penistone (Huddersfield Junction): Passenger train engine broke axle and derailed on points, then a mail train collided slightly with fallen engine.
12 June 1889	80	260		Armagh rail disaster: Runaway coaches collided with following train.
4 March 1890	4			Carlisle, Cumberland: Brakes misapplied.
10 November 1890	10			Norton Fitzwarren rail crash: two trains collided due to signaller and train crew errors.
1 May 1891	0	1		Norwood Junction crash: Cast-iron under-bridge broke under an express train.
27 May 1892	2	68		Derby Junction rail crash: two passenger trains collided at Derby Junction in Birmingham.
9 June 1892	5			Esholt Junction rail crash: two trains collide at junction, caused by unsafe procedures and a signal obscured by vegetation.
2 November 1892	10	43		Thirsk rail crash (1892): Rear-end collision, mistake by signalman after no sleep due to daughter taken ill and dying. Stated he was unfit to work, and why, but told he must; convicted of manslaughter but given absolute discharge.
12 August 1893	13			Llantrisant rail accident: Train down an embankment.
15 May 1894		5		Reading, Berkshire: Slip coach collided with passenger train.
22 December 1894	14			Chelford rail accident: Wind blew a truck into path of express.
10 November 1895	1	6		St. Neots derailment: Broken rail.
6 April 1896	1			Snowdon Mountain Railway: Runaway on hill derailed.
15 August 1896	1			Preston: Excessive speed on curve.
9 February 1897	12			Menheniot: Reconstruction of Coldrennick Viaduct: workman's platform fell.
11 June 1897	11			Welshampton rail accident, Shropshire: Derailment.
1 September 1897	1	31		Tooths Bank, near Heathfield, Sussex: Excessive speed caused derailment.
10 October 1897	1	2		Penistone station, West Riding: Light locomotive collided with a coach.
15 November 1897	2			Menheniot: Reconstruction of Trevido Viaduct, accident raising a heavy timber.
4 February 1898	7	8		Barassie Junction, South Ayrshire: Mail train and passenger train collided at high speed at junction.
21 March 1898	3	20		St Johns train crash 1898, London: Passenger train ran into the back of another passenger train in thick fog due to oversight by signalman.
18 July 1898	2	0		Acton, London: Passenger train from Windsor to Paddington. Inside connecting-rod of the engine broke and pierced the fire-box. Driver and fireman jumped or were thrown off but died in hospital the following day from burns.
2 September 1898	7	65		Wellingborough rail accident, Northamptonshire: Luggage trolley rolled off platform onto rails and derailed passing express.
17 October 1898	9	26		Wrawby Junction rail crash, Lincolnshire: Passenger train collided with derailed goods wagons hauling tree trunks.
8 December 1899	1	5		Norton Bridge, Staffordshire. The Irish Mail train ran over a bale of cloth fallen from a goods train which derailed some of the rear coaches which were then hit by a goods train, overturning the engine and derailing 16 waggons.
23 December 1899	3	12	Derailment	Between Glassford and Quarter Road on the Strathaven branch of the Caledonian Railway. The inquiry found an insuffiency of ballast led to a shifting of the permanent way which caused the derailment.
23 March 1900	7			Glasgow: Collision.
16 June 1900	5	35		Slough rail accident: Express passed signal at danger and collided with local train standing in station.
1 October 1900	1	2		Virginia Water, Surrey. Signalman forgot that passenger train was on the up platform and allowed a horse box train into the station resulting in a collision.
7 October 1900	0	51		Twickenham. Two trains collided while 4 carriages were being shunted from one train to another due to confusion over signalling.
24 October 1901	0	1		Bowling Tunnel, Bradford, West Riding: Defective coupling causing freight train to divide causing collision.
23 December 1901	6	0		Dingle, Liverpool: Electrical fault, train in tunnel. The insulation of an underfloor drive motor failed, causing arcing. The circuit breaker operated, but was repeatedly re-set by the driver. Eventually the arcing set fire to the wooden body of the coach.
25 April 1902	3	197		Hackney downs, London: Defective axle led to an axle failure and derailment, the train split and collided with a structure.
27 February 1903	0	35		Leven Viaduct near Ulverston: Early morning Carnforth-to-Whitehaven train blown over by high winds (Storm Ulysses) after being stopped on viaduct by fallen telegraph wires dislodging the engine's brake hose, destroying the vacuum and applying the brake.
27 July 1903	16	27		Glasgow St Enoch rail crash: Train ran into buffer stops.
20 February 1904	0	6		Gomshall station, Surrey: Derailment due to track defect.
3 October 1904	5	94		near Llanelli- Derailment due to excessive speed.
2 November 1904	0	2		Downton- Collision- signalman's error.
23 December 1904	4			Aylesbury station, Buckinghamshire: 4 killed were driver, secondman and 2 GPO employees. Mail train in fog and dark before dawn; train too fast on sharp curve entering station. The driver may not have had current route knowledge for that portion of the journey.
19 January 1905	7			Cudworth, West Riding: Collision of two Midland Railway trains with a third, in fog.
27 July 1905	20	48		Hall Road rail accident, Blundellsands, Lancashire: Two Lancashire & Yorkshire Railway electric passenger trains collided due to error on the part of a signalman (authorising the driver to pass an interlocked signal at danger) and the driver disregarding regulations for action in these circumstances.
1 September 1905	11	71		Witham rail crash, Essex: Derailment over track being repaired.
5 December 1905	6			Charing Cross roof collapse, London.
1 July 1906	28	11		1906 Salisbury rail crash: Express passenger train derailed due to speed on a tight curve at Salisbury in the early hours and collided with a milk train.
19 September 1906	13	17		Grantham rail accident, Lincolnshire: Derailment.
24 November 1906	2			Ulleskelf, East Riding: Passenger train overran signals and ran into the rear of a freight train.
28 December 1906	22			Elliot Junction rail accident, Forfarshire: Collision in blizzard.
29 December 1906	0	34		Collision between slip coach and main portion of a passenger train at Marks Tey.
17 April 1907	1			The Clarendon Film Company was filming a short drama at Coulsdon North railway station (Stoats Nest Station), depicting a clever Great Dane preventing a rail accident. The engine driver misunderstood his instructions and did not stop at the right place, killing a performer.
28 September 1907	1	12		Newport rail accident: collision
15 October 1907	18	33		Shrewsbury rail accident: Derailment at speed on curve.
5 March 1909	2	?		Tonbridge, Kent: Signal passed at danger.
21 April 1909	3			Cardiff Docks locomotive shed, Rhymney Railway, Wales: Safety valves, wrongly reassembled after repair, did not open, causing Boiler explosion.
26 October 1907	3	26		West Hampstead: Two passenger trains collided in fog.
1 January 1910	1	0		Braunton Road railway accident, Devon: 1 railwayman killed whilst opening level-crossing gates.
29 January 1910	7	65		Coulsdon North, Surrey: Rolling stock failure and derailment.
24 December 1910	12	17		Hawes Junction rail crash: Train hit 2 light engines; signalman's error: forgot train.
23 January 1911	11			Pontypridd railway accident: Rear collision.
18 November 1911	2	3	Sidelong collision	Dowlais Cae Harris, Glamorgan: Light engine passed signal at danger and crushed passengers alighting from an arriving colliery workers' train.
21 June 1912	4	63	Derailment	Hebden Bridge, West Riding of Yorkshire. Train derailed on a curve; "the general conclusion must be that the derailment was most probably caused by the train being drawn by a heavy tank engine at too high a speed, for that particular type of tank engine, round a moderate curve of 30 chains [2,000 ft; 600 m] radius."
17 September 1912	15	50		Ditton Junction rail crash, Lancashire, (now Cheshire): Train derailed, collided with a structure and then caught fire.
26 February 1913	2	2		Chumhill railway accident: 2 track workers killed; 2 injured.
2 September 1913	14	38		1913 Ais Gill rail accident: Train passed red signal, rear-end collision; underpowered engines and bad coal.
14 April 1914	2	12		Burntisland, Fife. Edinburgh-to-Aberdeen train collided with the Dundee goods train.
17 June 1914	1	9		Reading, Berkshire: Train passed signal at danger leading to collision with a second train.
18 June 1914	5	10		Carrbridge rail crash, Scottish Highlands: Bridge collapsed whilst a train was passing over it following torrential rain.
1 January 1915	10	500+		Ilford rail crash (1915): Driver passed signals at danger.
22 May 1915	226	246		Quintinshill rail crash, 22 May 1915; 226 killed, 246 injured: Troop train hit local standing train and 2 coal trains; another train hit wreckage caused by mistakes by signalmen.
14 August 1915	10	21		Weedon rail crash (1915), Northamptonshire: Detached coupling rod on a moving locomotive damaged adjacent track causing oncoming train to derail. Coaches toppled down an embankment as a result.
17 December 1915	19	82		St Bedes Junction rail crash: Double collision sent trains down embankment and fire consumed some of the wreckage. Procedural failures by driver and signalman.
2 February 1916	0	0		Penistone rail accident, West Riding: Penistone end of the viaduct north of station subsided; embankment and end arch fell, taking a locomotive with it.
3 February 1916	2	1		Torpantau, Brecknockshire: Signal passed at danger.
3 January 1917	12	46		Ratho rail crash, Queensferry Junction, West Lothian: Passenger express train collided with goods engine running light due to human error.
24 September 1917	10	0		Bere Ferrers rail accident, Devon: New Zealand troops just disembarked in the UK after voyage from NZ alighted via wrong side of train and onto track under misapprehension that Bere Ferrers railway station was in fact Exeter St Davids (where they were due to receive food rations) and were hit by another train travelling in opposite direction at 40 mph (64 km/h).
18 January 1918	1	4		Near Oswestry, Shropshire: Signalman's error – head-on collision on single line.
19 January 1918	7	46		Little Salkeld rail accident on Settle-Carlisle line: London St. Pancras to Glasgow express ran into landslip in cutting blocking line at 60 mph (97 km/h).
15 June 1918	1	8		Denburn South Junction, Aberdeen: Glasgow-to-Aberdeen passenger train strikes an engine running light on approaching Aberdeen Joint Passenger Station due to a signalman's error.
5 May 1919	1	1		Paddock Wood, Kent: Two goods trains collided due to excessive speed.
17 November 1919	0	11		Crewe, Cheshire: Chester-to-Crewe passenger train hit buffer stops in bay platform.
29 November 1919	1	4		Haverhill, Suffolk: Passenger train hit buffer stops in siding after leaving station due to error by the train driver and signalman.
17 July 1920	4	148		Lostock Junction, Bolton: Collision between two Lancashire & Yorkshire Railway passenger trains due to signal passed at danger.
4 August 1920	0	13		Littlehampton, West Sussex: Brakes failed, train collided with buffers.
26 January 1921	17	36		Abermule train collision, Montgomeryshire: Head-on collision on single line, inattention to proper procedures.
8 August 1921	0	17		Selby railway station, Yorkshire: Sidelong collision caused by passing danger signal due to driver error.
26 November 1921	3	24		Birmingham New Street. Collision caused by passing danger signal due to driver error, and moist tracks, which caused wheelslip.
19 April 1922	0	0		Ascot, Berkshire. Failure to apply brakes by staff while shunting resulted in light engine running away for approximately 6 miles.
6 December 1922	1	8		Birkenhead Park, Cheshire: Head-on collision between two Wirral Railway trains, failure to see a signal set at danger.

=== 1923–1947: The Big Four (railway companies) ===
Date	Killed	Injured	Type	Details
13 February 1923	3	23		Retford, Nottinghamshire: Driver error
15 April 1923	0	9		Curry Rivel Junction, Somerset: Signalman Error
5 July 1923	4	11		Diggle, West Riding: Driver error
3 November 1924	15	12		Lytham rail crash: Locomotive tyre fracture
20 November 1924	9	11		Whitehouse North Junction, Preston: Collision between a Preston-to-Ormskirk passenger train and a light engine.
12 October 1925	0	21		Llandudno Carnarvonshire: Driver error, signal passed at danger.
7 December 1925	9	6		Fenny Stratford, Buckinghamshire: Collision with road vehicle.
18 February 1926	1			Mangotsfield: A wagon examiner was walking in the sidings when he lurched into the path of a train and was run over.
30 August 1926	9			Naworth level crossing accident: Collision with charabanc on crossing.
19 November 1926	9			Parkgate and Rawmarsh, West Riding: Derailment and collision
14 February 1927	12	24		Hull Paragon rail accident: Head-on collision caused by signalling error.
27 February 1927	0	48		Penistone: Shunting engine passed signal meant for express, collision.
24 August 1927	13			Sevenoaks railway accident: Derailment.
27 June 1928	25	45		Darlington rail crash: head-on collision. Driver misunderstood a calling on signal during shunting and passed home signal at danger.
9 July 1928	2			London Bridge: Driver of light engine misread signals.
9 October 1928	1	14		New Tredegar: During temporary single-line working signalman allowed train up to signal which it failed to stop at, colliding with train running the other way (first passenger fatality on GWR since 1916).
13 October 1928	16	41		Charfield railway disaster, Gloucestershire; Night mail train passed signals at danger hit shunting freight train. The mail train was lit by fuel gas and this ignited shortly after the impact, causing a severe fire.
8 January 1929	4	38		Ashchurch: Signal overrun.
12 February 1929	2	0		Doe Hill: Head-on collision. Signalman's error.
20 November 1929	3			Combe Down Tunnel accident: Train crew overcome by smoke in a tunnel, runaway train crashed into a goods yard.
9 January 1930	0			Lawrence Hill: Rear collision, signalman incorrectly accepted next train.
22 March 1931	6			Leighton Buzzard, Bedfordshire: Train derailed due to driver exceeding speed limit on slow lines.
17 June 1932	4	54		Great Bridgeford, Staffordshire: Excessive speed
25 May 1933	5			Raynes Park, Surrey: Train derailed due to uncompleted track maintenance.
10 July 1933	1	35		Little Salkeld: Signalman's error
6 December 1933	1	6		Altrincham: Signalman's error
19 December 1933	2	1		Hellifield, West Riding: Shunter/guard error caused head-on collision.
19 December 1933	1	0		Swindon: Retired GWR chief mechanical engineer George Jackson Churchward killed while using foot crossing by the Fishguard express.
July 1934	1			Mangotsfield: A platelayer was hit by a train while clearing weeds from the track.
6 September 1934	9	11		Port Eglinton Junction, Glasgow: Head-on collision.
28 September 1934	12			Winwick rail crash: Collision at junction: overloaded signalman, mistake by his assistant lad.
15 June 1935	14	81		Welwyn Garden City rail crash: rear-end collision caused by signalman's error.
15 January 1936	2	10		Shrivenham: Train collided with breakaway wagons.
23 December 1936	0	0		Mangotsfield: Two passenger carriages derailed while shunting after becoming fouled on a set of points.
2 April 1937	10	80		Battersea Park rail crash: Signalling error.
10 December 1937	35	179		Castlecary rail crash: Whiteout in snowy night and snow blocked points, rear-end collision.
21 January 1938	3	46		Oakley Junction, Bedfordshire: Signalman's error
8 April 1938	2	15		Rutherglen: Axle defect.
4 August 1938	1	3		Wishaw South, Lanarkshire: Driver error – excessive speed
22 February 1939	1	161		Glasgow: Passing Signal at danger caused by driver error, rear-end collision with another passenger train at Stobcross West Junction.
4 February 1940	1	6		Watford: Landslide, embankment slid onto track.
4 November 1940	27	56		Norton Fitzwarren rail crash (1940): Driver read wrong signal, drove off end of track at 40 mph (64 km/h).
15 February 1941	1			Mangotsfield: A 15-year-old railway employee was involved in an accident with a train, receiving severe head injuries.
2 July 1941	5	24		Dolphin Junction, Slough: Signalman failed to notice train.
14 September 1941	9	45		Holmes Chapel, Cheshire: Signalman's error.
30 December 1941	23	57		Eccles rail crash: Train passed red signal in fog and wartime blackout, collision on crossing.
2 February 1942	14	54		Cowlairs East Junction collision. Signalman's error: cleared signals on the running line while it was occupied by a stationary light engine. There was a delay in implementing Rule 55, which required the fireman to enter the signalbox to ensure that his engine was protected by signals.
16 January 1944	9	38		Ilford rail crash: Politician Frank Heilgers killed, signal passed at danger in fog.
13 March 1944	1	7		Near Henstridge, Somerset: unconfirmed 1 killed, 7 injured: U.S. road transport vehicle crashed through bridge wall onto passing train.
2 June 1944	2	29		Soham rail disaster: Explosion of ammunition wagon.
16 August 1944	8	61		Upchurch, Kent: V-1 flying bomb destroys a bridge directly ahead of an express train.
10 January 1945	22	27		Ballymacarrett rail crash: Collision caused by driver error; excess speed in fog.
4 February 1945	2	26		King's Cross railway accident: Locomotive slipped to stand in tunnel, train rolled back into station.
30 September 1945	43	64		Bourne End rail crash: excess speed on turnout.
10 November 1945	0	23		Woking crash: Driver and other errors Passenger train collides with rear of second passenger train.
31 December 1945	3	10		Northwood Middlesex: Collision due to excess speed in fog
1 January 1946	20	21		Lichfield rail crash: Signal interlocking failed due to frozen points, goods train collided with rear of stationary passenger train.
5 January 1946	10	18		Browney rail crash: Goods train divided and crashed, the wreckage of which was hit by an express travelling in the opposite direction.
10 February 1946	2	17		Potters Bar rail crash: Driver error and signalman's error caused passenger train to hit buffers. Derailed coaches fouled main line and were hit by two express train.
19 March 1946	1	13		Mottingham: Signaller error. Electric passenger train collided with a stationary light engine that was waiting to move into the sidings.
10 November 1946	0	7		Marshmoor, Hertfordshire: Derailment due to track defects
27 December 1946	0	3		Byfleet, Surrey: Derailment due to track defects
2 January 1947	7	45		Gidea Park: Signalman's error in fog, rear-end collision.
18 May 1947	0	4		Lambrigg Crossing signal box between Grayrigg and Oxenholme: 4 hospitalised. Express driver missed a signal while looking in his food box, hit light engine.
21 July 1947	5	64		Polesworth, Warwickshire: Derailment due to track defects.
9 August 1947	18	118		Doncaster: Signalman's error, rear-end collision.
24 October 1947	32	183		South Croydon rail crash: Signalman's error in fog, rear-end collision.
26 October 1947	27			Goswick rail crash: Excess speed on diversion, driver did not read warning notice.
6 November 1947	4	101		Motspur Park, Surrey: Fogman's error
10 December 1947	1	2		Train of tank wagons carrying petrol ran out of control and crashed through buffers at Manchester Victoria station, caused by misjudgement by the driver.

=== 1948–1994: British Railways/Rail ===
Date	Killed	Injured	Type	Details
17 April 1948	24	30		Winsford rail accident, Cheshire: Glasgow-to-Euston train was stopped by passenger inappropriately pulling communication cord. Following train hit stopped train due to a signalman's error.
19 May 1948	8	34		Wath Road Junction: Buckled track derailed locomotive; train rolled down embankment.
16 October 1948	2	0		Conington level crossing: The 4 pm train from Peterborough to London strikes a car on the level crossing, killing former mayor of Peterborough Arthur Mellows and his dog.
30 November 1948	5	36		Stockport Viaduct, Cheshire/Lancashire: In dense fog, a stationary passenger train from Manchester to Crewe and Disley was run into by following passenger train from Manchester to Buxton, which had passed a signal at danger. Two rearmost coaches of standing train were telescoped.
16 December 1948	1			Mangotsfield: A 16-year-old railway employee was hit by a mail train.
23 June 1949	0	7		Train fire near Penmanshiel Tunnel: two coaches of Edinburgh-to-King's Cross express destroyed by fire.
30 September 1949	1			Mangotsfield: A train fireman was hit by an express train.
4 October 1949	2			Oakley (Bedfordshire): Freight train collides with stationary freight train on viaduct and plunges off it into a meadow
13 May 1950	0	68		Preston, Lancashire: Passenger train from Southport collided with a stationary light engine after passing signals at danger
8 June 1950	5	0		near Beattock Summit: Fire on train.
27 August 1950	6	35		Penmaenmawr crash, north Wales: Up Irish Mail sleeper train from Holyhead to Euston collided with shunting locomotive at night due to signalman's error.
7 September 1950	3	1		Hopworthy, Holsworthy, Devon: Train hit tractor on farm crossing.
16 March 1951	14	29		Doncaster rail crash, West Riding: Southbound express passenger train to London King's Cross partly derailed on a poorly maintained crossover shortly after leaving Doncaster, one coach destroyed.
14 July 1951	0	22		Train fire near Huntingdon: four coaches of King's Cross-to-Leeds express destroyed by fire.
17 August 1951	3	41		Newcastle rail crash between electric units due to starting when signal at danger.
21 September 1951	15	26		Weedon crash, Northamptonshire: Jammed locomotive axlebox caused derailment of Liverpool Lime Street-to-Euston passenger train at speed
18 April 1952	0	34		Blea Moor (Settle-Carlisle Line): Brake rod on locomotive tender detached and derailed train.
8 October 1952	112	340		Harrow and Wealdstone rail disaster, Middlesex: During fog conditions, driver failed to obey signals, his train struck the rear of a stationary train, a third train travelling in the opposite direction struck the wreckage.
25 October 1952	0	3		Crewkerne: Brake rod on locomotive tender detached and debris flew through coach.
5 May 1953	6	0		Ystrad Caron level-crossing near Tregaron: van with six occupants on crossing hit by non-scheduled train.
15 August 1953	10	58		Irk Valley Junction rail crash near Manchester: 5-car EMU train collided with steam-hauled train at Irk Valley Junction, Collyhurst, caused by a signalman's error and driver inattention.
28 October 1953	0	1		Goswick derailment: Glasgow-to-Colchester express passenger train derailed at Goswick.
17 December 1953	1	1		Longniddry station: A section of track fell off a down freight train on to the up line derailing a parcel train from Edinburgh to Kings Cross.
23 January 1955	17	43		Sutton Coldfield rail crash: Train on diversionary route, pilot driver with route knowledge was unfamiliar with type of locomotive, speed on curve, train strewn over platforms.
28 May 1955	3	40		Wormit, Fife: Train derailed at excessive speed in tunnel, overturning onto a platform at Wormit Station. Locomotive fireman and two passengers on footplate killed.
20 November 1955	11	157		Milton rail crash, Oxfordshire: Passenger train from Treherbert to London Paddington derailed whilst passing over a crossover at excessive speed.
2 December 1955	13	35		Barnes rail crash: rear-end collision because signalman error.
22 December 1955	1	50		Luton station accident: Northbound passenger train in rear-end collision with stationary northbound passenger train.
6 September 1956	0	3		Ludlow, Shropshire: Collision due to driver error.
7 January 1957	1	25		Welwyn Garden City rail crash, Hertfordshire: Signals ignored in fog, rear-end collision with another passenger train.
9 February 1957	2			Chapel-en-le-Frith rail crash, Derbyshire: Runaway freight train rear-end collision with another freight train due to brake failure. Deceased driver of runaway train posthumously awarded George Cross.
4 December 1957	90	173		Lewisham rail crash, south-east London: Missed signals in fog, rear-end collision with another passenger train. Overbridge fell on wreckage when bridge's abutment was struck by derailing locomotive and coaches.
30 January 1958	10	89		Dagenham East rail crash: Signal passed at danger in thick fog by passenger train, rear-end collision with preceding passenger train
4 July 1958	0	45		Maze Hill station: Signal passed at danger, head-on collision of 4-car EMU from Gravesend Central to Charing Cross with 9-coach empty passenger stock train being shunted by a steam locomotive
25 August 1958	5	41		Eastbourne station rail crash, 22 serious injuries, 19 minor: Sleeper train from Glasgow passed signal at danger, collided head-on with 12-car EMU from Ore to London Bridge as the latter is leaving platform at the station.
19 November 1958	0	5		Hitchin rail crash, No fatalities, 5 minor injuries: The 3:25 am London-to-Peterborough freight train collided with the rear of the 2:28 am London-to-Peterborough freight train which had been held at the down main 'Home' signal. Some wagons derailed across the up main and were almost immediately hit by the 10:35 pm Leeds-to-London freight train. A stationary light engine on the adjacent up slow was also struck and overturned.
26 October 1959	0	22		Ardsley: Collision due to inadequate signalling arrangements.
21 January 1960	5	9		Settle rail crash: Locomotive slide bar fell off due to failed bolts; connecting rod became detached destroying adjacent track; oncoming goods train derailed into side of passenger train.
24 November 1960	2	26		Between Pontrhydyfen and Cwmavon, Glamorgan: Head-on collision between 3-car passenger DMU travelling from Swansea High Street to Barry Island and a runaway steam-hauled goods train.
2 December 1960	4	1		North Belton level-crossing, near Dunbar, East Lothian: Car with five occupants hit by two freight trains on a level-crossing.
8 February 1961	0	6		Royton, Lancashire: Runaway train crashed through buffers and demolished a pair of terraced houses.
13 February 1961	3	7		Baschurch, Shropshire: Signalman's error caused collision between passenger train travelling at 40–45 mph (64–72 km/h) and freight train locomotive that was shunting its wagons into a siding. The locomotive, tender and a stores van of the passenger train overturned and ended up on the station platform where the stores van burst into flames and burned out.
18 April 1961	2	42		Pitsea, Essex: steam-hauled passenger train from London Fenchurch Street to Shoeburyness overturned after running over catch points.
16 July 1961	7	116		Singleton Bank rail crash, Weeton, Lancashire: signalman let train enter section of line under engineer's possession, collided with ballast train.
3 June 1962	3	7		Lincoln rail crash: Excess speed on curve.
26 December 1962	18	34		Coppenhall Junction rail disaster, Cheshire: Express hit a second express from the rear. Driver passed signal at danger as phone was out of order, hit stationary train in next section.
25 January 1963	2	3		Bracebridge Gas Sidings, Lincoln: 2-car DMU travelling from Grantham to Lincoln Central collided with a stationary steam locomotive.
31 July 1963	1	2		Between Picton and Welbury, North Riding of Yorkshire: Freight train ran into the back of another freight train due to a signal passed at danger.
15 August 1963	3	3		Knowle and Dorridge rail crash: Pullman train from Birmingham Snow Hill to London Paddington ran into freight train being shunted across its path due to signalman's error.
6 December 1963	2	2		Stanton Gate, Stapleford, Nottinghamshire: two freight trains collided due one passing a signal at danger.
13 December 1963	1	31		Shoreditch, east London: Rear coach of a Liverpool Street-to-Gidea Park train derailed shortly after leaving terminus and is struck by a train travelling in the opposite direction.
5 March 1964	2	0		Itchingfield Junction, West Sussex: Collision between up goods train (Brighton to Three Bridges, diverted via Steyning line), which overran signals, and down goods train (Three Bridges to Chichester)
28 May 1964	3	27		Cheadle Hulme, Cheshire: Train derailed crossing a temporary railway bridge over road widening work at well in excess of the temporary 10 mph (16 km/h) speed limit.
3 June 1964	3	17		Bradford Exchange station, West Riding: Driver of DMU train suffered heart attack, train ran out of control on steep downhill approach to station and collided with a stationary mail train at platform.
25 June 1964	1	4		Nantwich station level-crossing, Nantwich, Cheshire: Express passenger train from Plymouth to Manchester passed signal at danger and crashed through level-crossing gates into 2 road vehicles.
5 October 1964	0	1		Finsbury Park: Two passenger trains collided in dense fog when the green signal was given in error. The trains were the 08:20 Kings Cross – Doncaster and 09:00 Kings Cross – Newcastle. The only injury was to the driver, who had to be cut from the train.
10 October 1964	1	4		Millbrook, Bedfordshire: Eight-car DMU from St. Pancras to Bedford travelling at 60 mph (97 km/h) when a fire broke out under the last coach. One passenger died and others injured after jumping from moving train to escape fire.
11 January 1965	1	2		Coton Hill rail crash, Shrewsbury: Driver of goods train failed to obey stop sign, derailed on trap points and crashed through Coton Hill signal box.
29 March 1965	2	15		Elm Park, near Dagenham, Essex: Derailment – unknown persons placed obstruction on line, derailed London-Fenchurch St.-to-Shoeburyness passenger train travelling at 70 mph (110 km/h)
20 May 1965	0	11		Hest Bank, Lancashire: Derailment caused by broken rail.
4 September 1965	1	5		Holyhead station, Anglesey: local passenger train from Bangor collided with stationary boat train to Euston due to inattention and lack of caution of driver and fireman.
22 September 1965	3	8		Roundstone level-crossing, Angmering, Sussex: In thick fog a 4-car EMU passenger train crashed through crossing gates, closed across line in error by crossing keeper, and collided with a Southdown double-deck bus traversing the crossing, pushing it 54 yards (49 m) along the track. Bus destroyed by fire.
17 December 1965	2	0		Bridgend, Glamorgan: Locomotive derailed due to landslide whilst hauling train of empty passenger coaches, and this in turn was run into by a freight train.
13 May 1966	2	5		Acton Grange Junction, Warrington, Cheshire: Rear section of moving freight train became uncoupled on gradient in the dark and ran downhill into an oncoming London Euston-to-Stranraer boat train, killing the driver and co-driver of the latter train.
28 February 1967	9	16		Stechford rail crash, Birmingham: Misunderstood hand signal coupled with an unauthorised movement of a diesel locomotive crossing the running lines into the path of multiple unit passenger train travelling at 60 mph (97 km/h).
5 March 1967	5	18		Connington South rail crash, Huntingdonshire: Signal operator wilfully defeated interlocking and moved facing points while passenger train was passing over them.
22 May 1967	0	12		Tyseley North Junction, Birmingham: A.W.S. pickup shoe fixing bolts worked loose and fell out under the locomotive hauling a London-Birmingham express passenger train. The shoe struck the stretcher bar of facing points at around 60 mph, causing the points to move under the train.
11 July 1967	0	13		Maidstone East station, Kent: Freight train passed signal at danger and ran into rear of stationary passenger train; error by guard resulted in inadequate brake power; excessive speed.
31 July 1967	7	45		Thirsk rail crash (1967): Derailment of the rear portion of a freight train led to wagon fouling adjacent track, passenger express ran into wagon at approximately 50 mph (80 km/h).
27 September 1967	1	23		Foxhall Junction, Didcot: Derailment caused by train driver driving at excessive speed through crossover. (O. S. Nock was a passenger).
5 November 1967	49	78		Hither Green rail crash: Hastings-to-Charing Cross train derailed at 70 mph (110 km/h) (113 km/h) due to broken rail.
6 January 1968	11	27		Hixon rail crash, Staffordshire: Express passenger train collided at level crossing with road-transporter carrying 110-ton transformer.
11 March 1968	2	1		Peterborough North: Freight train ran into back of another freight train due to driver error.
23 March 1968	2	1		Hatfield, Hertfordshire: Train driver error caused freight train to crash through buffers on a spur line and into an over-line bridge abutment at about 30 mph (48 km/h).
16 April 1968	5	0		Beckingham, Gainsborough, Lincolnshire: Stalled car hit by train on half barrier level-crossing situated between Gainsborough Trent junction and Beckingham (the crossing was subsequently closed and a by-pass built). All five occupants in the car were killed, including three children.
12 June 1968	2	10		Sandridge, Hertfordshire: Fire on diesel multiple unit after gearbox failure damaged fuel tank; poor maintenance.
9 September 1968	2	3		Castlecary, Stirlingshire: Locomotive running light ran into the back of a stationary six-car DMU standing at a signal.
4 January 1969	4	11		Marden rail crash, Marden, Kent: Express passenger train ran past signal at danger in fog and collided with parcels train.
8 March 1969	2	45		Ashchurch, Gloucestershire: Bristol-to-Newcastle upon Tyne express passenger train hit part of a freight train which was derailing due to travelling at excess speed. The sides of several coaches on the passenger train were torn off and two coaches derailed.
8 April 1969	2	30		Monmore Green, Wolverhampton: Freight train struck head-on by a passenger train which passed signal at danger; subsequent fire.
7 May 1969	6	121		Morpeth rail crash (1969), Northumberland: Driver inattention led to night sleeper train derailing on tight curve at excessive speed (80 mph (130 km/h).
31 December 1969	1	9		Roade Junction, Northamptonshire: 4-car Coventry-to-London-Euston EMU passenger train collided with a derailed freight train.
20 May 1970	2	13		Audenshaw Junction rail crash, Lancashire: Points changed under train; signalman tampered with equipment to speed up working.
26 February 1971	1	13		Sheerness-on-Sea, Kent: 10 coach EMU passenger train overran buffers, 13 on train injured, woman waiting in booking hall killed. Driver taken ill.
18 May 1971	2	1		Middlesbrough, North Riding: Freight train ran into rear of stationary freight train standing at a signal having not been warned by signalman, who should have refused permission to enter that section, of latter's presence.
2 July 1971	2	26		Tattenhall Junction, near Chester, Cheshire: School excursion train derailed; buckled track.
8 May 1972	0	2		Chester General station rail crash, Chester, Cheshire: Freight train vacuum brakes not connected, runaway train hit empty passenger stock in station.
1 June 1972	6	126		Eltham Well Hall rail crash, south-east London: Excessive speed on curve: driver intoxicated, assistant driver lacked route knowledge.
16 December 1972	0	11		Copyhold Junction, just north of Haywards Heath on London-to-Brighton Line: Slow train from Haywards Heath passed signal at danger, moving onto through line from local line, struck by Victoria-bound fast train.
30 August 1973	5	51		Shields Junction near Glasgow: Collision between two passenger trains followed by fire; no clear cause – driver possibly suffered heart attack.
19 December 1973	10	94		Ealing rail crash, west London: Battery box door fell open, hit lineside equipment which operated points under train.
11 June 1974	1	35		Pollokshields East, Glasgow: EMU passenger train passed signal at danger and collided with DMU passenger train; driver error.
23 January 1975	1	11		Watford Junction rail crash, Hertfordshire: Express derailed by a steel stillage that had fallen from freight train, then hit by another express.
6 June 1975	6	67		Nuneaton rail crash, Warwickshire: Excessive speed caused derailment of sleeper train. Temporary speed limit equipment faulty and inattention by driver.
26 October 1975	1	41		Lunan Bay, Angus: Collision of recovery locomotive and failed train (10.15 Aberdeen to London-King's Cross). Confusion over exact location of failed train and excessive speed.
3 January 1976	2	2		Worcester Tunnel Junction, Worcester: Locomotive running light runs into the rear of a parcels train due to driver failure to comply with signalman's instructions.
2 June 1976	0	0		Reading, Berkshire: tire failure results in derailment of express train from Penzance to Paddington
3 December 1976	1	8		Chivers Occupation level-crossing, Cambridgeshire: Passenger train collided with lorry on unmanned level crossing.
2 July 1977	0	0		Between Wolverton and Bletchley. Derailment of express parcels train due to undetected continuous-welded rail buckle in hot weather.
5 September 1977	2	10		Farnley Junction, Leeds: Signalling problems resulting from technical work by engineering staff lead to head-on collision between passenger train and mail train.
6 July 1978	12	19		Taunton train fire, Somerset: Dirty linen stacked against electric heater, (victims died from carbon monoxide poisoning); locked doors.
19 December 1978	3	57		Between Hassocks and Preston Park, Sussex: Train ran into rear of another due to incorrect passing of both a caution signal and next signal (showing no aspect), as per rule book requirements.
1 March 1979	3	5		Naas level-crossing, Lydney, Gloucestershire: Lorry crossed unmanned level-crossing in front of Cardiff-to-Newcastle upon Tyne passenger train travelling at 60 mph (97 km/h). Train crew and lorry driver killed.
25 February 1979	1	9		Hilsea, Portsea Island: Train struck overhanging crane on adjacent track.
16 April 1979	7	67		Paisley Gilmour Street rail crash, Renfrewshire: Inattention by driver ("ding-ding, and away"); head-on collision.
13 August 1979	0	2		Bushbury Junction, West Midlands: Camshaft failure of a switch diamond crossing caused the approaching Manchester-Piccadilly-to-Birmingham International express to derail at around 35 mph (56 km/h), train lightly loaded. Driver did not return to his duties and died 1 year after the incident.
22 October 1979	5	52		Invergowrie rail crash, Perth and Kinross: Train stopped due to traction motor fire, following train ran into rear, poorly maintained signalling equipment.
16 February 1980	0	48		Bushey, Hertfordshire: On a section of continuous welded rail a welded joint failed. 20:25 Euston-to-Manchester-Piccadilly derailed at 96 mph (154 km/h). Coaches derailed blocking the adjacent Up Fast Line and Watford DC Line.
9 July 1980	0	21		Holborn rail crash, central London: Inattention by driver, signal passed at danger, rear-end collision.
7 November 1980	2	1		Crewe, Cheshire: Freight train ran into rear of another freight train for reasons unknown.
8 December 1981	1	23		Ulleskelf, East Riding: Broken rail led to derailment of York-to-Liverpool passenger train. Two rearmost coaches rolled down steep embankment.
11 December 1981	4	5		Seer Green rail crash, Buckinghamshire: Signalman misread equipment, excess speed after driver authorised to pass signal at danger, rear-end collision.
4 May 1982	0	31		Nairn's level-crossing, Forteviot, Perth & Kinross: Agricultural tractor and trailer grounded on farm crossing hit by express passenger train at 55 mph (89 km/h). Entire train derailed.
August 1982	N/A	30		Darlington: InterCity 125 ran into the back of another train
9 December 1982	1	2		Linslade Tunnel, West Coast Main Line. At 2 am a northbound passenger train derailed when it struck permanent way material that had fallen from a previous train. Locomotive hit bridge pier, driver killed.
3 February 1983	1	12		Elgin, Moray: Broken rail leads to derailment of Aberdeen-to-Inverness passenger train, rearmost coach turned on its side and slid about 100 metres.
23 November 1983	0	3		Paddington Station approaches, London: Excessive speed approaching Paddington. Penzance-Paddington sleeper derailed, locomotive 50041 extensively damaged.
9 December 1983	1	3		Wrawby Junction rail crash, Lincolnshire: Passenger DMU train hit and partially derailed by freight train mistakenly signalled to proceed whilst line ahead in use by passenger train.
24 June 1984	0	35		Morpeth rail crash, Northumberland: Excessive speed, sleeping car train derailed, driver intoxicated.
30 July 1984	13	44		Polmont rail crash, near Falkirk: Leading DBSO of Edinburgh-to-Glasgow train hit stray cow on line, whole train derailed.
1 August 1984	N/A	25		Birtley, Tyne & Wear: Northbound InterCity 125 derailed
11 October 1984	3	18		Wembley Central rail crash, London: Collision due to signal passed at danger. Driver mentally incapacitated by medical condition.
4 December 1984	3	68		Eccles rail crash (1984), Greater Manchester: Signal passed at danger, rear-end collision.
20 December 1984	0	0		Summit tunnel fire, Todmorden, West Yorkshire: Faulty axle box caused derailment of petrol tank wagons in tunnel, fire burned for over 36 hours.
31 May 1985	0	104		Battersea Park Station, London: Gatwick Express passenger train passed signal at danger in fine, sunny conditions and ran into rear of commuter train that was accelerating away from another signal at which it had been held.
6 November 1985	0	40		Copyhold Junction, near Haywards Heath, Sussex: 4-car EMU passenger train passed signal at danger at night, passed over points and collided head-on with another 4-car EMU passenger train travelling in opposite direction.
9 March 1986	1	31		Chinley, Derbyshire: Multiple errors by inexperienced signalman led to passenger train being sent onto line where two coupled locomotives were waiting. Collision despite driver of lead waiting locomotives starting to reverse when he saw other train approaching.
15 June 1986	0	2		Motherwell: Defective and poorly maintained track coupled with hot weather. At approximately 16.31 the 16.10 Glasgow-Central-to-London-Euston passenger train became derailed on the approach to Motherwell Station.
26 July 1986	9	11		Lockington rail crash, East Yorkshire: Road vehicle on level-crossing.
19 September 1986	1	60		Colwich rail crash, Staffordshire: Head-on collision at converging route. Driver misread signals after failing to read a notification regarding recent signalling changes.
11 September 1986	2	2		Bridgeton, Glasgow: 2 empty passenger trains collided in tunnel during shunting movement killing 2 crew. Signaller cleared signal for reversing train which did not pass signal after 5 minutes, then set new route for incoming train. Reversing train passed signal, now at danger, and collided with incoming train. Deceased guard did not keep adequate lookout, signaller did not check driver of reversing train knew signal had been reset to danger.
16 October 1986		23		Kensal Green rail crash: Network SouthEast Class 313 collided with rear of Bakerloo line train following driver's misinterpretation of a signal.
19 October 1987	4			River Towy rail crash, near Llandeilo: flood washed bridge away; train fell into river.
October 1987	0	14		Forest Gate, London: two trains collided.
11 November 1988	1	16		St. Helens rail crash, Merseyside: Train derailed leaving station.
30 November 1988	0	15		Newcastle: Front of northbound train struck rear of southbound train on the King Edward VII Bridge outside the station.
12 December 1988	35	484		Clapham Junction rail crash, London: Rear-end collision, oncoming train ran into wreckage: wrong-side signalling failure due to wiring error.
4 March 1989	5	88		Purley Station rail crash, London: Missed distant signal, overshot signal at danger; rear-end collision, part of train down embankment.
6 March 1989	2	53		Glasgow Bellgrove rail crash: Inattention by driver ("ding-ding, and away"); head-on collision.
5 August 1989	0			West Ealing: Train collided with a piece of rail left on the track, probably by vandals, and the locomotive was derailed.
1 August 1990	0	41		Reading, Berkshire: Signal passed at danger resulted in collision between 2 passenger trains
4 August 1990	1	36		Stafford rail crash (1990): Train signalled into an occupied section, rear-end collision, alcohol and excessive working hours possible causes.
8 January 1991	2	542		Cannon Street Station rail crash, London: Passenger train hit buffer stop.
21 July 1991	4	22		Newton (South Lanarkshire) rail accident, Glasgow: head-on collision at junction.
7 December 1991	0	186		Severn Tunnel rail crash: Rear-end collision, cause uncertain.
13 November 1992	1	0		Morpeth rail crash 1992, Northumberland: Light engine hit train in rear, driver misunderstood signaller's instruction.
6 September 1993	0	1		Maidstone East, Kent: Derailment due to driver error, excessive speed.
25 June 1994	2	0		Greenock rail crash: Train derailed by vandals placing concrete blocks on track.
27 July 1994	0	1		Morpeth rail crash 1994, Northumberland: excessive speed on curve.
15 October 1994	5	13		Cowden rail crash, Kent: Signal passed at danger; head-on collision.

=== 1995 onwards: Post-privatisation ===
Date	Killed	Injured	Type	Details
31 January 1995	1	30	Derailment and head-on collision	1995 Ais Gill rail accident: Train hit landslide, oncoming train hit wreckage.
11 July 1995	0	5	Collision with buffers	Largs, North Ayrshire: Buffer stop collision at terminus station.
10 November 1995	0	1	Rear-end collision	Royal Oak tube station: Collision.
8 March 1996	1	22	Derailment and head-on collision	1996 Stafford rail crash, Staffordshire: axle box failure, train derailed across other tracks, mail train hit wreckage.
8 August 1996	1	69	Head-on collision	Watford rail crash, West Coast Main Line, Watford: Signal passed at danger, head-on collision with empty stock.
4 February 1997	0	4	Derailment	Bexley derailment, London: Derailment due to overloaded train and poor track maintenance.
19 September 1997	7	139	Head-on collision	Southall rail crash, Great Western Main Line, Southall: Signal passed at danger, collided with freight train crossing path. Driver inattention and faulty Automatic Warning System equipment.
18 June 1998	0	9	Derailment	Sandy, Bedfordshire: Wheel failure caused by metal fatigue. East Coast mainline express derailed south of the station at approximately 100 mph (160 km/h) and came to a halt 400 metres (1,300 ft) north of the station.
8 January 1999	0	4	Rear-end collision	Spa Road Junction rail crash, London: Train passed signal at danger, converging collision, driver error.
23 June 1999	0	31	Rear-end collision	1999 Winsford railway accident, Cheshire: Train passed red signal; rear-end collision.
5 October 1999	31	417	Head-on collision	Ladbroke Grove rail crash Great Western Main Line, London: Driver passed signal SN109 at danger; head-on collision and fire; allegations made at subsequent Inquiry that signal SN109 was hard to see.
17 October 2000	4	70+	Derailment	Hatfield rail crash East Coast Main Line, Hertfordshire: Derailment caused by broken rail; restaurant coach hit overhead lines (catenary) stanchion.
1 November 2000	0	1	Rear-end collision	Lawrence Hill, Bristol: Driver injured due to incorrect brake operation an empty mail train passed 2 red lights and hit the back of a loaded coal train.
28 February 2001	10	82 serious	Collision with road vehicle and head-on collision	Great Heck Rail Crash East Coast Main Line, near Selby, North Yorkshire: Driver of Land Rover fell asleep and ran down embankment onto track where it was hit by passenger train and a freight train.
28 February 2002	1	14	Collision with road vehicle	Nocton railway disaster, Lincolnshire: 1 killed in van, 14 injured on train after van crashed through wall and fell onto track.
10 May 2002	7	76	Derailment	Potters Bar rail accident, East Coast Main Line, Hertfordshire: Undetected points fault derailed train, coaches rolled coming to rest on platforms.
24 November 2002	0	31	Derailment	Southall East: Broken fishplate caused HST coach to derail, throwing ballast through windows.
7 July 2003	3	5	Collision with road vehicle on level crossing	Near Pershore, Worcestershire: Minibus carrying farm workers struck by Hereford-to–London Paddington train on a farm level crossing. Lineside telephone to contact signaller not used. Network Rail had visited site 2 months earlier and reminded farmer of safety obligations.
3 August 2003	1	0	Collision with road vehicle on level crossing	Burmarsh Road, Romney, Hythe & Dymchurch Railway: Train driver killed, car on level crossing.
15 February 2004	4	3	People struck by runaway trolley	Tebay rail accident West Coast Main Line, Cumbria: Runaway work trolley due to faulty brakes; ran down railway trackworkers.
6 November 2004	7	71	Collision with road vehicle on level crossing	Ufton Nervet rail crash Reading-to-Taunton Line, Berkshire: A man committed suicide by parking his car on a level crossing, which the inbound InterCity 125 struck, derailing the train.
10 July 2005	1	0	Collision with road vehicle on level crossing	Romney, Hythe & Dymchurch Railway: Train driver killed, car on level crossing.
3 December 2005	2	0	People struck by train on level crossing	Elsenham, Essex: two teenage girls using the station's pedestrian level crossing killed by a train.
25 September 2006	1	0	Collision with road vehicle	Copmanthorpe, North Yorkshire: Road vehicle crashed through fence onto railway derailing Virgin CrossCountry Super Voyager train.
23 February 2007	1	88	Derailment	Grayrigg derailment, Cumbria: Train derailed over a set of faulty points.
1 February 2008	0	3	Collision with collapsed structure	Barrow upon Soar train crash, Leicestershire: Collision between train and an iron footbridge toppled just beforehand by a ballast tipper lorry.
4 January 2010	0	2	Derailment	Carrbridge derailment, Scottish Highlands: Freight train derailed just past Carrbridge railway station, Rail Accident Investigation Branch confirmed accident was snow and ice working its way into the space between the brake blocks, line was closed until 13 January. Other possible contributions to the accident was that ploughed snow was left to accumulate too close to the side of the tracks, and the speed of passing trains may have led to snow being pulled into the brake mechanisms.
16 January 2010	1	0	Collision with road vehicles on level crossing	Welsh Marches Line, Moreton-on-Lugg, Herefordshire: an Arriva Trains Wales train struck two cars on a level-crossing between Hereford and Leominster. One of the cars' passengers was killed. Investigation concluded that the signaller had opened the barriers as the train approached, believing it had already passed, after being distracted by a telephone call.
17 August 2010	0	23	Collision with road vehicle on level crossing	Little Cornard derailment, Suffolk: sludge tank wagon at telephone-operated works level crossing hit passenger train.
5 November 2010	0	6	Collision with road vehicle	Oxshott, Surrey: a cement mixer lorry fell off a road bridge, striking a Guildford-to-London train. 1 passenger and the lorry driver were seriously injured; others received minor injuries.
22 October 2011	1	0	Platform-train interface accident	Liverpool James Street: 16-year-old girl killed when she fell between departing train and platform. Guard who gave the signal to depart while girl was leaning on train convicted of manslaughter and given 5-year jail sentence.
21 July 2013	0	8	Collision with stationary train	Norwich station, Norfolk: 8 passengers taken to hospital after an Abellio Greater Anglia DMU crashed at 8 mph (13 km/h) into two other stationary DMUs in the station. Insufficient braking due to driver inattention. RAIB report indicated employer failed to spot drivers previous lapses in concentration.
7 May 2014	1	0	Collision with road vehicle on level crossing	Malton, North Yorkshire: 77-year-old man killed after his car was struck on a level crossing by a First TransPennine Express train from Scarborough to Liverpool Lime Street.
3 April 2016	0	18	Collision with stationary train	Plymouth, Devon: Eighteen injured when Great Western Railway Class 150/2 collided with an InterCity 125 power car at Plymouth.
10 April 2016	0	12	Collision with road vehicle on level crossing	Roudham, Norfolk: An Abellio Greater Anglia train from Norwich to Cambridge hit a tractor on a level crossing. The tractor driver suffered serious injuries. Train driver and ten passengers sustained minor injuries.
10 September 2016	0	5	Collision with road vehicle on level crossing	Dymchurch, Kent: Train hit a tractor on a level crossing. Train driver and 4 passengers injured.
16 September 2016	0	2	Derailment and head-on collision	Watford Junction: A London Midland train from Milton Keynes to Euston de-railed following a landslide and was hit by an oncoming train in a tunnel.
3 July 2019	2	0	People struck by train	Margam, South Wales: Two railway workers were killed after being struck by a Great Western Railway train near Port Talbot Parkway. Following confusion about duties, staff worked without a lookout.
28 January 2020	0	0	Derailment	Eastleigh derailment: A freight train derailed after leaving Eastleigh, blocking the line between Southampton Central and Basingstoke. No-one was hurt but the derailment caused major disruption to local train services.
12 August 2020	3	6	Derailment	Stonehaven derailment: an Abellio ScotRail Inter7City HST operating the 06:38 Aberdeen-to-Glasgow Queen Street derailed at Carmont, near Stonehaven following a landslip.
26 August 2020	0	0	Derailment	Llangennech derailment: a freight train carrying diesel derailed and caught fire at around 23:20. About 100 people living within 800 m of the fire were evacuated from their homes. No injuries or fatalities were reported.
13 March 2021	0	1	Collision with buffers	Kirkby train crash, Merseyside: A Merseyrail Class 507 overran the buffers at Kirkby Station and derailed. Twelve people suffered minor injuries.
31 October 2021	0	14	Rear-end collision	2021 Salisbury rail crash: A South Western Railway service collided with a Great Western service in Fisherton Tunnel on its approach to Salisbury station. Train was unable to stop at signal due to leaves on the line and crashed into a second train.
24 August 2023	1	1	Person struck by train	Nottinghamshire Police sergeant Graham Saville was struck by a train whilst attempting to save a distressed man on the tracks near Balderton. Sergeant Saville was taken to hospital in critical condition whilst another man was sent to hospital with non-life threatening injuries after receiving an electric shock. Saville died in hospital five days later.
29 September 2023	0	2	Collision with stationary train	Aviemore railway station: 60103 Flying Scotsman collided with stationary carriages at 6:05 pm in Aviemore, Scotland, injuring two people.
21 October 2024	1	15	Head-on collision	2024 Talerddig train collision: two trains collided head-on near Llanbrynmair, Powys around 900 metres West of Talerddig passing loop, (the former site of the railway station) at around 7:26 pm. One person died following the collision and 15 were taken to hospital with injuries not thought to be life threatening or life changing, 4 of which were considered serious.
22 May 2025	0	6	Collision with road vehicle on level crossing	Leominster: At around 10:37 am a Transport for Wales Driving Van Trailer operating the 08:30 Manchester to Cardiff service, struck a loaded agricultural trailer which was being hauled by a tractor across Nordan Farm user worked level crossing. The train was travelling at 80mph and of the 66 passengers and 8 staff on board, 6 passengers were reportedly treated for minor injuries. The tractor driver was uninjured.
13 July 2025	1	0	Collision with road vehicle on level crossing	Teynham, Kent: A Southeastern service struck an Amazon delivery van on a user worked level crossing at around 12:42 pm. The driver of the van was declared dead at the scene, no injuries were reported aboard the train.
2 November 2025	0	4	Derailment	2025 Shap derailment: an Avanti West Coast train derailed at 06:10 after hitting a landslide in Cumbria, injuring four people.
19 June 2026	1	162	Rear-end collision	2026 Bedford train collision: an East Midlands Railway class 360 unit collided with the rear of an East Midlands Railway Class 810 unit south of Bedford Station.
25 June 2026	1	1	Collision with road vehicle on level crossing	Hoghton, Lancashire: A Northern service from Colne to Preston formed of a 150/2 2-car DMU struck a car on an automatic half barrier level crossing at around 08:50. The driver of the car died at the scene, while the car passenger suffered life-threatening injuries. No other injuries were reported. It was reported that the warning system were not activated, and that the train had a green signal when the accident occurred.
13 August 2026	0	20	Derailment	Lewes derailment, Lewes, East Sussex: A commuter train derails at 15:55 BST.

There were 732 deaths from 146 accidents in 46 years when there was national rail provided by the state between 17 April 1948 and 15 October 1994. There were 92 deaths from 50 accidents in 28 years when there was privatised rail between 31 January 1995 and 24 August 2021.

== London Underground ==
Despite the high passenger numbers on the London Underground, and the substantial age of some its infrastructure, passenger fatalities due to train-related incidents are exceptionally rare. The last train collision that killed more than one person was the Moorgate tube crash in 1975. Between 1999 and 2020 there were seven derailments, which caused injuries (some severe) but no fatalities. The Chancery Lane derailment in 2003 led to a closure of the Central line whilst urgent safety checks were undertaken. Fatal accidents killed one person each in 2020, 2022 and 2023; two were passengers who fell onto the tracks and one was in a car that crashed into the railway line.

== Tram and light rail ==
Fatal accidents have occurred involving trams; the worst took place in Dover in 1917, when a tram ran away down a hill and overturned, killing 11 people and injuring 60. In 2016, a tram derailed on a sharp bend and overturned in Croydon, killing seven people and injuring 50.

== Staff accidents ==
For much of the 19th and 20th centuries, working on the United Kingdom's railway was very dangerous for many staff. In 1900, for example, for every one passenger killed or injured in a crash, there were seven worker casualties. This amounted to 15,698 staff injuries and 631 fatalities.

The 'Railway Work, Life & Death' project is uncovering details of British and Irish staff accidents before 1939 and making them freely available, via a database of transcriptions of staff accident investigations and other related records. At March 2023, the database documented nearly 50,000 individuals.

The National Railway Museum has an online exhibit, looking at railway safety—with a focus on the staff.

== Gallery ==
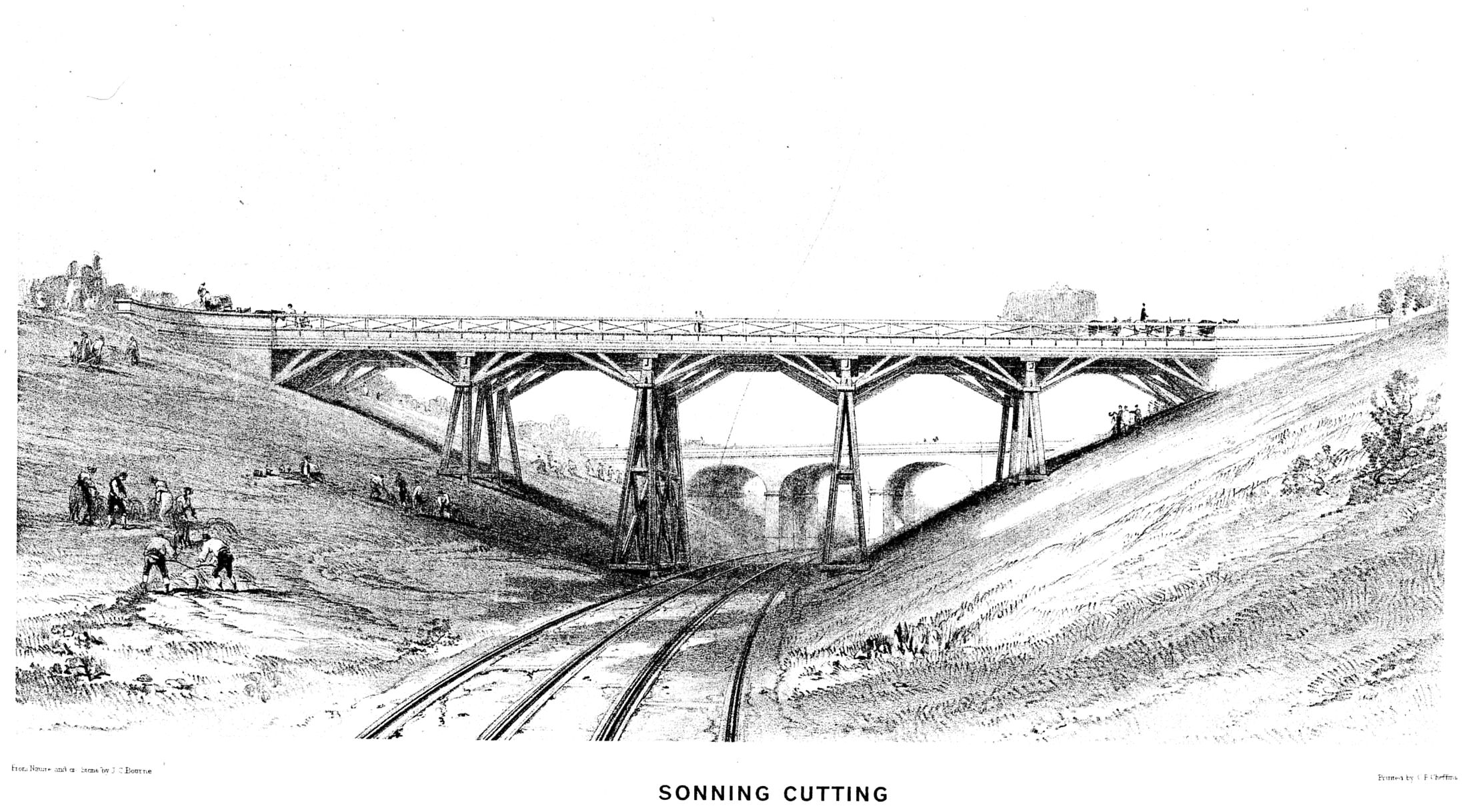
Sonning Cutting, close to the scene of the accident, 24 December 1841. Workmen appear to be repairing bank-slips on the southern side of the cutting at left. Print by JC Bourne published in 1846

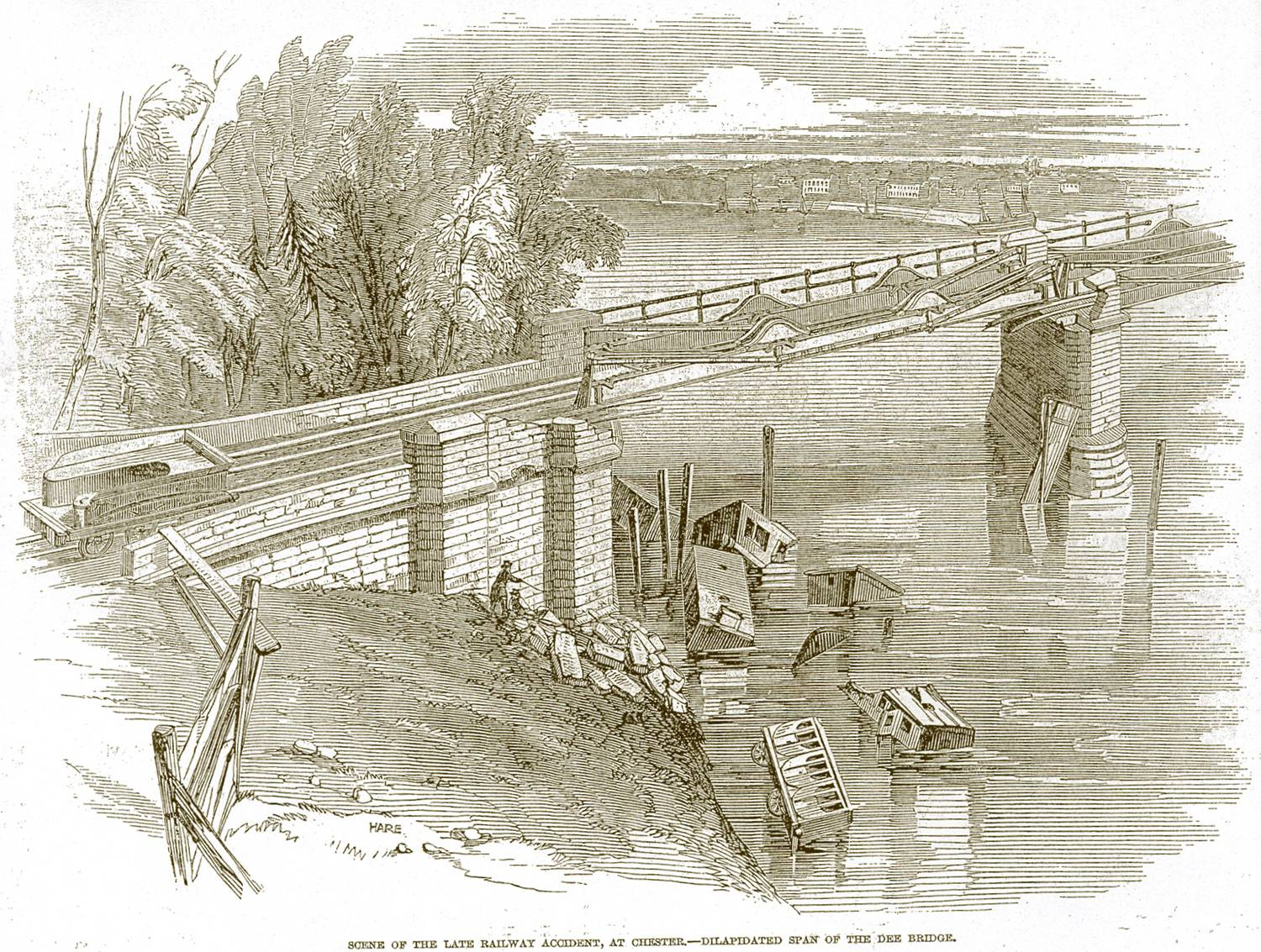
The Dee bridge after its collapse, 24 May 1847

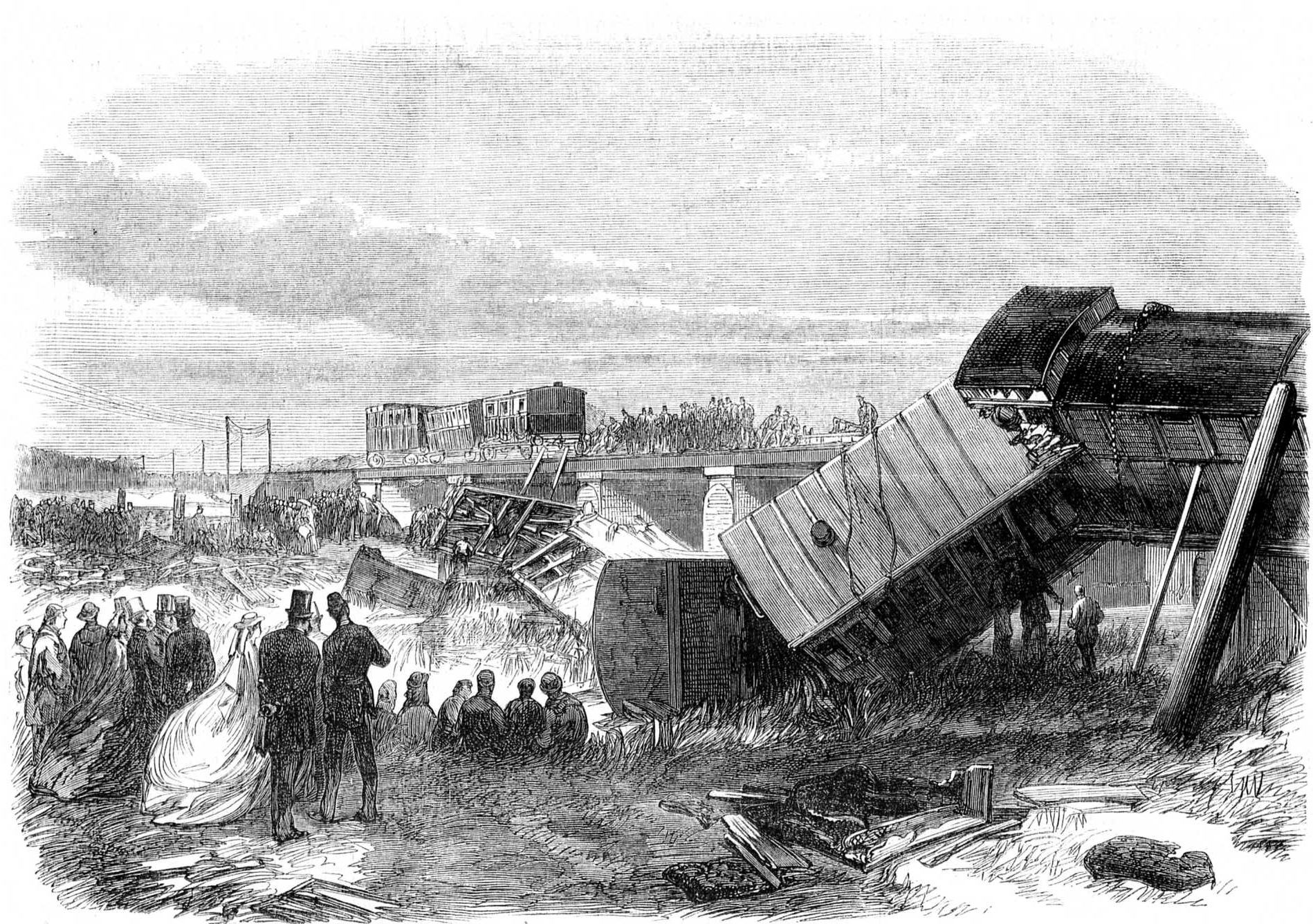
Staplehurst rail crash, 9 June 1865

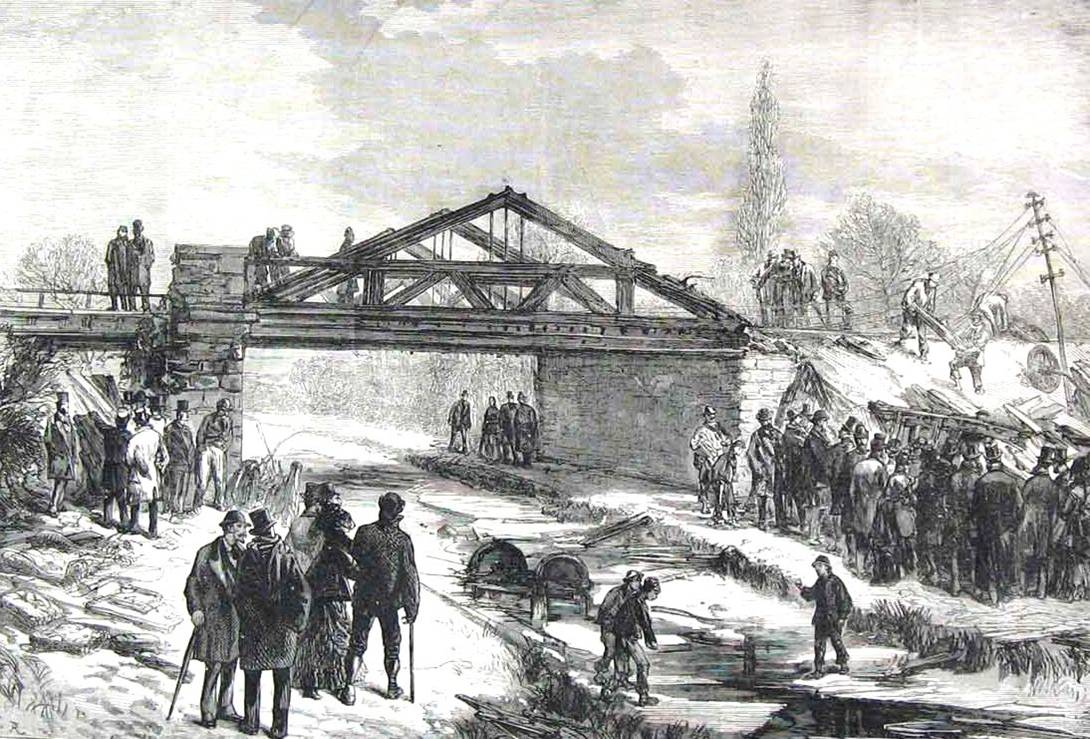
Shipton-on-Cherwell Disaster, 24 December 1874

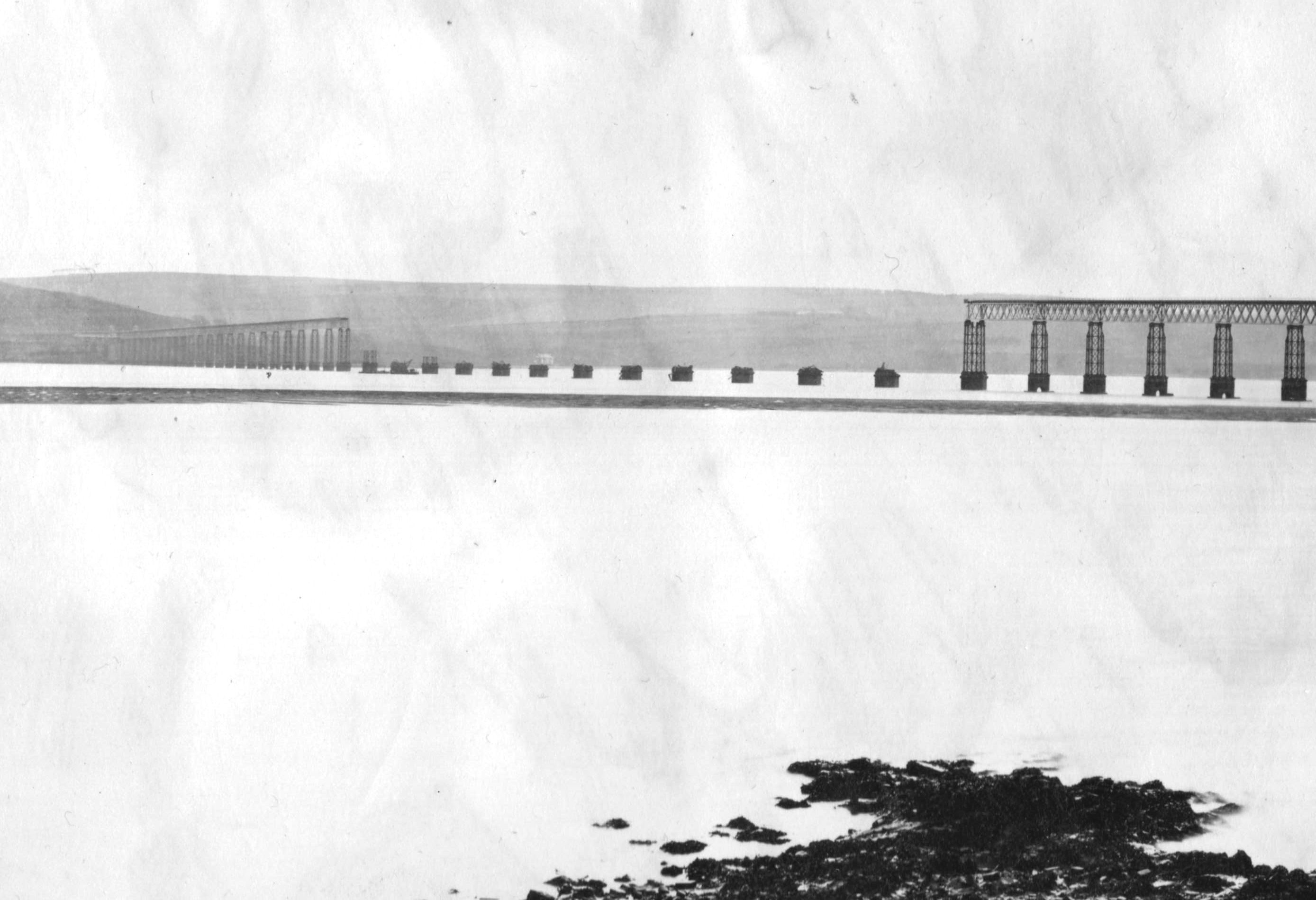
Fallen Tay Bridge from the north, 28 December 1879

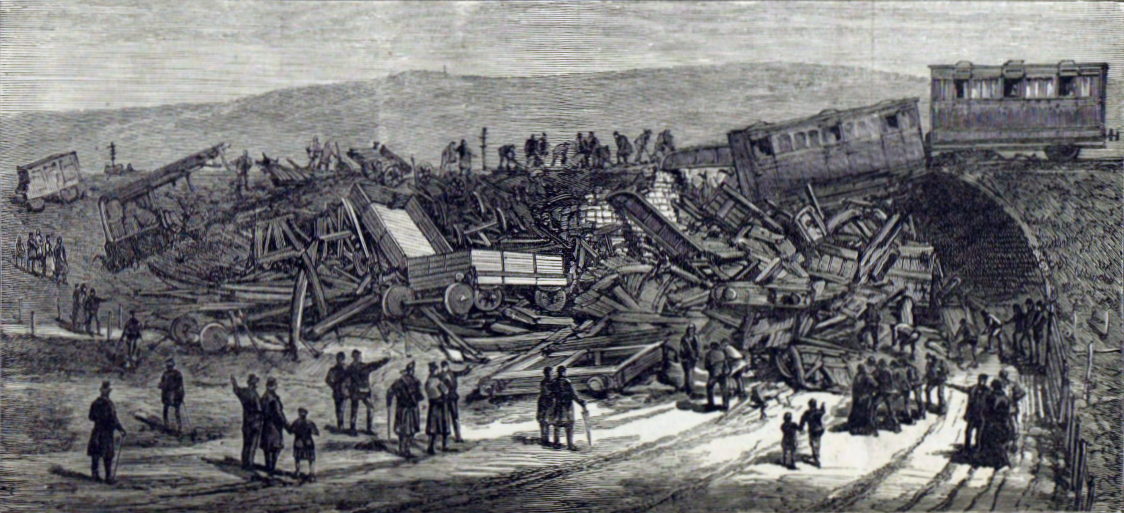
Inverythan crash, 27 November 1882

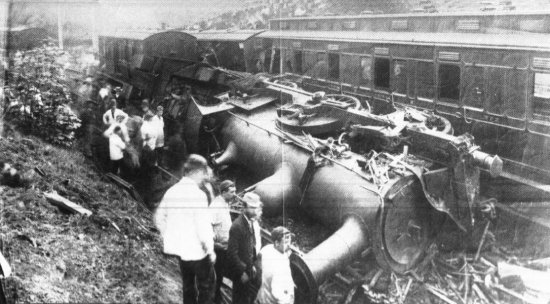
Esholt Junction rail crash, 9 June 1892

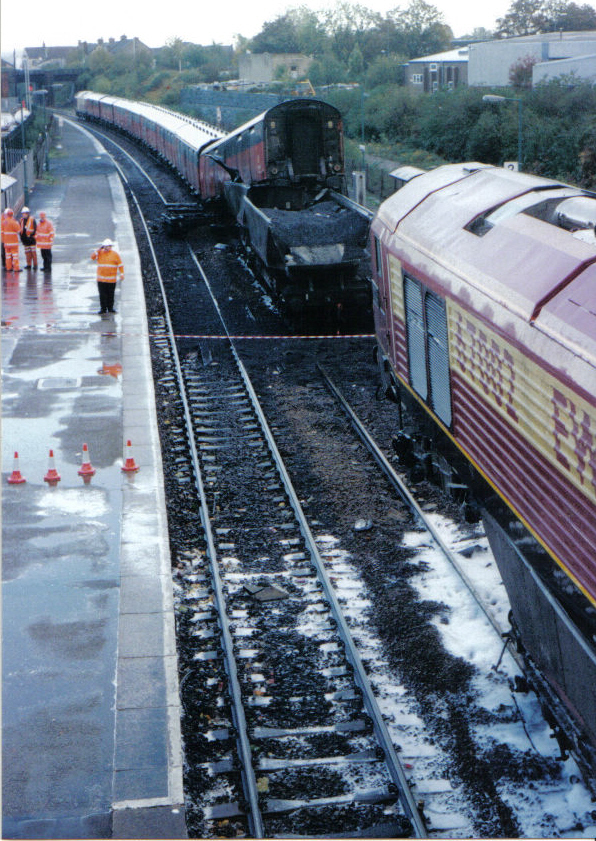
Royal Mail train crashes into the back of a loaded coal train at Lawrence Hill station, 1 November 2000

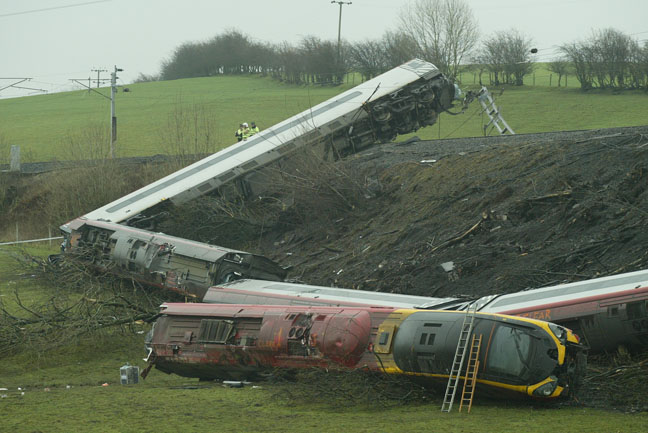
Grayrigg derailment, 23 February 2007

== See also ==
- Great Western Railway accidents
- Lists of rail accidents by country
- Lists of rail accidents
- List of accidents and disasters by death toll

== Sources ==
- Bradley, D.L. (September 1985) [1963]. The Locomotive History of the South Eastern Railway (2nd ed.). London: RCTS. ISBN 0-901115-48-7.
- Bray, N. (2010). The Salisbury & Dorset Junction Railway. Southampton: Kestrel Railway Books. ISBN 978-1-905505-19-7.
- Currie, J.R.L. (1971). The Runaway Train: Armagh 1889. Newton Abbot: David & Charles. ISBN 0-7153-5198-2.
- Dendy Marshall, C. F.; Kidner, R. W. (1982) [1963]. History of the Southern Railway (Revised ed.). Shepperton: Ian Allan. ISBN 0-7110-0059-X.
- Garfield, Simon (2002). The Last Journey of William Huskisson. London: Faber and Faber. ISBN 0-571-21608-0.
- Kichenside, Geoffrey (1997). Great Train Disasters. Avonmouth: Parragon. ISBN 0-7525-2229-9.
- MacDermot, E.T. (1927). History of the Great Western Railway. Vol. I (1st ed.). Paddington: Great Western Railway. OCLC 4106652.
- Nock, O.S.; Cooper, B.K. (1987) [1966]. Historic Railway Disasters (4th ed.). Shepperton: Ian Allan. ISBN 0-7110-1752-2.
- Rolt, L. T. C. (1955). Red for Danger: A history of railway accidents and railway safety precautions (1st ed.). The Bodley Head.
- Rolt, L. T. C.; Kichenside, G. M. (1978). Red for Danger (3rd (revised and extended) ed.). London: Pan Books. ISBN 0-3302-5555-X. OCLC 16443245.
- Rolt, L. T. C.; Kichenside, G. M. (1982). Red for Danger: A history of railway accidents and railway safety (4th ed.). Newton Abbot, Devon: David & Charles. ISBN 0-7153-8362-0. OCLC 9526651.
- Slater, J.N., ed. (March 1974). "Topics: Cause of Ealing derailment". Railway Magazine. Vol. 120, no. 875. London: IPC Transport Press Ltd. ISSN 0033-8923.
- Waters, Laurence (1990). Reading. Rail Centres. Shepperton: Ian Allan. ISBN 0-7110-1937-1.
- Vaughan, Adrian (1993). The Great Western at Work 1921–1939. Yeovil: Patrick Stephens Ltd. ISBN 1-85260-300-3. R300.
- Vaughan, Adrian (August 2003) [2000]. Tracks to Disaster. Hersham: Ian Allan. ISBN 0-7110-2985-7. 0308/B2.
