= Watford rail crash =

1996 rail crash in England

Coordinates: 51.6580°N 0.3884°W

Details
- Date: 8 August 1996; 17:24
- Location: Watford
- Country: England
- Line: West Coast Main Line
- Operator: Network SouthEast
- Owner: Railtrack
- Cause: Signal passed at danger

Statistics
- Trains: 2
- Deaths: 1
- Injured: 69

In the early evening of 8 August 1996, a Class 321 passenger train operated by Network SouthEast passed a signal at danger travelling from London Euston on the West Coast Main Line Down Slow line at approximately 110 km/h (68 mph). Having applied the brakes it eventually stopped 203 m (222 yd) past the signal and was traversing the junction between the Down Slow line and the Up Fast line. An empty Class 321 coaching stock train approaching at roughly 80 km/h (50 mph) collided with the stationary passenger train approximately 700 m south of Watford Junction whilst progressing across the connections from the Up Slow line to the Up Fast line.

One person was killed and sixty-nine were injured, including four members of the train's crew. The person who was killed was Ruth Holland, book review editor of the British Medical Journal.

== Criminal proceedings ==
As a result of this accident, the train driver was charged with manslaughter by the Crown Prosecution Service on 10 January 1997, following an investigation by the British Transport Police. On 11 March 1998, the driver was acquitted at Luton Crown Court.

In its report, the Health and Safety Executive (HSE) advised that there was insufficient evidence to justify legal proceedings against the other involved parties, namely Railtrack and Network SouthEast.

== Incident report ==
Following delays caused by the criminal proceedings against the driver, the HSE and the Office of Rail Regulation jointly published its Report into the railway accident at Watford South Junction on 8 August 1996 on 29 April 1998, a summary version was published on the internet on 21 May 1998.

=== Contributing factors ===
The HSE and ORR concluded in its incident report that there were a number of mitigating factors that contributed to the incident.

1. The collision would have been avoided if the Automatic Train Protection (ATP) system had been fitted to the train and track.
2. The inappropriate positioning of a speed restriction sign as a result of imprecise wording in the Railway Signalling Standard which gave confusing information to the driver of the passenger train.
3. The signal passed at danger had a shorter than normal safety margin known as an 'overlap' intended to reduce risks from small misjudgements by train drivers or increased braking distances (e.g. as a result of wet leaves on the line).

== See also ==
- List of British rail accidents
- Southall rail crash – SPAD accident in September 1997.
- 2026 Bedford train collision
