= Penistone rail accidents =

List of rail accidents in Penistone South Yorkshire, England

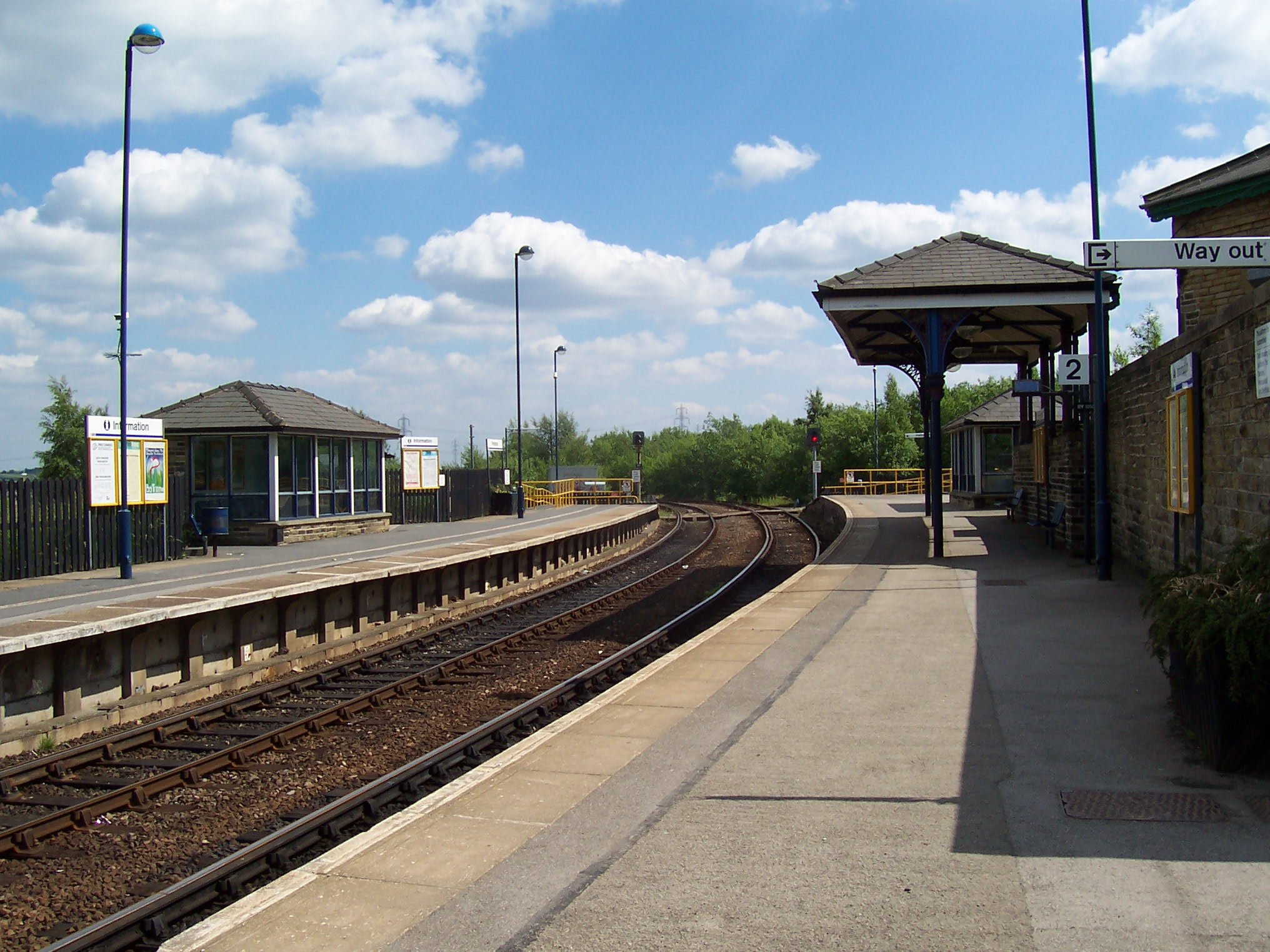
Penistone Railway Station

Over the latter years of the 19th and early years of the 20th centuries, Penistone in Yorkshire gained a name as an accident black-spot on Britain's railway network; indeed, it could be said to hold the title of the worst accident black-spot in the country. The main line through the town was the Woodhead route of the Manchester, Sheffield and Lincolnshire Railway between Sheffield Victoria and Manchester, London Road. The line was heavily graded with a summit some 400 yards inside the eastern portal of the Woodhead tunnel.

== Cattle Drover's Neglect, 1845 ==
During a parliamentary committee meeting to debate the building of the Liverpool and Manchester Railway, George Stephenson was asked if it would not be awkward should a train hit a cow. His now classic reply, given in his broad Northumbrian dialect, was to state "Oo, ay, very awkward for the COO!".

On the evening of 6 October 1845 this assumption was dramatically put to the test. Shortly after leaving Dunford Bridge the Sheffield bound train struck a cow, which a drover from Penistone market had been unable to remove from the line. The impact caused the locomotive and carriages to derail and the cow was killed instantly. Such was the force of the accident that the cow was almost entirely cut in half.

None of the passengers suffered any injuries other than some minor bruising, although the guard was more severely injured. A replacement train was dispatched from Sheffield and the passengers all completed their journey by two o'clock the following morning.

== Bullhouse Bridge accident, 1884 ==
Bullhouse Bridge rail accident

Details
- Date: 16 July 1884
- Location: Bullhouse Bridge
- Coordinates: 53.5203°N 1.6752°W
- Country: England
- Line: Manchester, Sheffield and Lincolnshire Railway
- Cause: axle failure

Statistics
- Trains: 1
- Deaths: 24

The first major accident occurred on 16 July 1884, a few miles to the west of the town, near Bullhouse Colliery. The accident is often referred to as being at "Bullhouse Bridge", where the road to Huddersfield passes below the line. An express passenger train, the 12:30 pm from Manchester London Road to London King's Cross, with through carriages for Grimsby Docks in connection with the evening steamer sailing, had left Woodhead Tunnel and was gathering speed on the downhill gradient towards Penistone. The locomotive was 4-4-0 No. 434, built at Gorton Locomotive Works.

As it entered the curve at Bullhouse, the driver felt the engine develop an uneasy roll, but before he could apply the brakes, he heard a crack. A driving wheel axle on the locomotive had snapped, and the resulting spread of the driving wheels distorted the track. The axle fracture was probably caused by metal fatigue. A Cheshire Lines Committee horsebox coupled behind the engine was derailed but remained upright. The coupling between the horsebox and the following carriages failed, and the first five GNR carriages (the London portion of the train) ran off the rails and down the embankment on the outside of the curve. The last five MS&L carriages (the Grimsby portion) were also derailed but suffered less damage.

Nineteen passengers were killed at the scene. Five more later died in hospital, the last on 6 August. Many of the dead were women and the toll also included railway mechanical engineer Massey Bromley.

The Inspector's report allowed that the accident "could not have been foreseen or prevented". It did however question, among other matters, the use of inside cranked axles, and the use of iron rather than steel for these important components.

== Barnsley Junction accident, 1885 ==
The next unfortunate incident took place on the other side of Penistone Station, between Huddersfield Junction and Barnsley Junction, within six months. On 1 January 1885 a special excursion train from stations in the Sheffield area to Liverpool (9 coaches) and Southport (9 coaches) was climbing towards Penistone. At the same time a train of empty coal wagons travelling in the opposite direction to return the wagons to collieries in South Yorkshire and North Nottinghamshire was descending the gradient and had just passed the Huddersfield Junction signal box when one of the wagons derailed. The driver of the locomotive applied his brakes and this wagon, Shireoaks No. 218, jumped forward and became buffer-locked with the wagon in front, Shireoaks No. 1, which also came off the rails, and struck the locomotive of the excursion. The wagon was brushed aside by the locomotive but rebounded after the first four of the excursion's carriages passed. The fifth, sixth and seventh carriages were wrecked and the following three were brought off the track. Four passengers were killed in the accident and 47 others were injured, many of them very seriously.

On examination, Shireoaks No. 218 wagon was found to have a fractured axle with two flaws in the metal, a problem again caused by metal fatigue. Unexpected catastrophic failure of axles (and wheels) was a problem on all railway vehicles at the time, owing to the lack of understanding of the causes, especially fatigue crack initiation and growth. Crack initiation was usually caused either by defects or poor design, with stress concentrations raising the local stress to failure. The small crack so created would then grow slowly under repeated loading from usage until the axle could no longer withstand imposed loads. (It was noted that the day of the Barnsley Junction accident was very cold and the ballast under the railway sleepers was frozen, increasing the loads on the wheels and axles.)

Although the Manchester, Sheffield and Lincolnshire railway could not be held directly responsible for this accident, the enquiry recommended more thorough inspection of all rolling stock.

== Huddersfield Junction accident, 1889 ==
The next serious accident occurred four years later on 30 March 1889. This was the day of the F.A. Cup Final. Preston North End, then considered the best team in the country, were due to play Wolverhampton Wanderers at Kennington Oval, and the University Boat Race was to take place over the Thames Tideway between Putney and Mortlake in London. The Manchester, Sheffield and Lincolnshire Railway ran an excursion with portions from Liverpool, Southport and Wigan to London, Kings Cross. Although it was not intended as a football excursion, many people from Lancashire took advantage of it to watch Preston play. The Southport portion of the train was joined to the main train from Liverpool at Warrington Central and the Wigan portion was picked up at Glazebrook. The completed train made its way over the Cheshire Lines Committee tracks to Godley Junction where a stop was made for Railway Clearing House checks. It departed 55 minutes late. The locomotive was Class 23 No. 188, a six-coupled locomotive, which was usually to be found on goods workings, but was regularly used on excursion traffic.

The train ran down the gradient towards Penistone station when the locomotive, having no leading wheels to guide it, jumped the points where the goods line diverged from the main line on the approach to the Huddersfield Junction signal box. The locomotive crew stood by their posts and applied the brakes. The coaches followed the locomotive into the "six-foot" ripping up some 25 yards of track. The tender capsized and became entangled in signal wires, the locomotive dug into the ballast and the front coach was totally smashed. Coaches two and three toppled onto their sides and the following three which were pulled round in different directions were left standing broadside against the first pair. One person was killed and many injured. Those with minor injuries were treated at Penistone Station, those with more severe injuries were taken to the Wentworth Arms Hotel, opposite the bottom of the station approach road, where the billiard room was turned into an operating theatre.

A further crash was averted by the prompt action of the signalman in Huddersfield Junction box. Having witnessed the crash he sent the message to Barnsley Junction, the next box on the Sheffield side, to "Stop the Mail", but the 10:40 pm King's Cross to Manchester Mail had already passed by. He set all his signals against the train and the driver applied his brakes but it could not stop before hitting the tender of the crashed locomotive. The Mail train's buffers penetrated the plating of the tender and the bogie wheels were thrown off the track, but the engine did not reach the crashed coaches.

The Railway Inspectorate found that the leading axle of the locomotive had fractured and questioned both the use of a "goods locomotive" on passenger work, where they would travel at higher speeds than usual, and the locomotive having no leading bogie wheels.

== More 19th century accidents ==
8 December 1882. An accident in Penistone station during shunting operations. Two passengers injured.

1 September 1886. The through coach to Huddersfield, conveyed on the 5:30 pm King's Cross to Manchester (London Road) express was detached at Penistone and placed to await collection by the local train. The MS&LR locomotive and the leading brake backed onto its train, the impact sending the six coaches, dining car and rear brake into the ticket platform. Twenty passengers were slightly injured.

September 1887. Just one year later, an almost identical accident occurred.

10 October 1897. An accident at Penistone station when a light locomotive collided with a carriage. Three people were injured, one later died of concussion.

== 20th century accidents ==
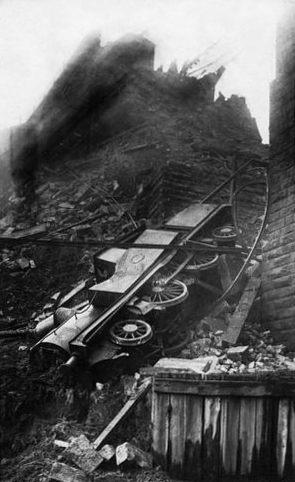
L&YR 661 after the Penistone railway accident, 2 February 1916. The locomotive proved impossible to recover in one piece and so was scrapped on site, and a replacement built with the same number.

2 February 1916. Probably the only accident to take place on the Lancashire and Yorkshire Railway line, at the Penistone end of the viaduct which takes the tracks northward from the station. A Lancashire & Yorkshire Railway 2-4-2T locomotive, No. 661, was standing when the end of the viaduct and the embankment subsided below it. The collapse was slow and the crew jumped to safety before the arch fell down. The cause of the collapse was stated to be scouring of the foundations after prolonged heavy rain; the parapet of the viaduct had been observed to be cracked some days earlier.

27 February 1927. An avoidable accident blamed mainly on signalman's error, in which an LMS locomotive, Aspinall radial tank No. 10760, from the Huddersfield line, having arrived and discharged its passengers, needed to clear the line to allow an empty coaching stock train from Bradford to enter the station. It shunted its stock into the other LMS platform to prepare for the return working. The locomotive then needed to be turned (unnecessarily but following usual practice on the line) and worked to the opposite end of the train, a move needing quite a few backwards and forwards shunts. The final move to reach the front of his train was via the LMS "up" line, a wrong line movement which started on the LNER line as this was the only route available to reach his train. The driver made this last movement on his own, the fireman being sent to "mash" (brew) the tea in the porter's room. The last move was controlled by a hand signal but having given the signal, the Huddersfield Junction signalman, new on shift at 6 pm, forgot to set the points for the LMS line and the locomotive went along the main line into the station platform. The driver realised that something was wrong and stopped. On seeing the signal at the east end of the platform go "off", he thought that the signalman had realised his error and the signal was meant for him. He moved off to regain his right line, but the signal was in fact intended for the Manchester – Marylebone express, loaded to five coaches and hauled by class D10 "Director" No.5437 "Prince George", which was approaching. Because of the speed restriction in force at Penistone, the train was easing up and the impact speed was around 20 miles per hour (32 km/h). The LMS driver was the most seriously hurt in the accident. His fireman jumped clear and the LNER crew were shaken.

The Huddersfield Junction signalman was held to be responsible for the accident, although the LMS driver did receive a mention in the report for his breach of rules. The Inspector also referred to Rule 55(b) which provided that the fireman should go to the signalbox and remain there to remind the signalman of the presence of his train, standing on a running line.

== Effects on the railway ==
The stretch of line where all these accidents occurred is among some of the bleakest scenery in the Pennines, and as none of the earlier accidents could be conveniently ascribed to human error, the superstitious had a field day. Penistone was reckoned to be an unlucky place to cross the hills. Other bad publicity concerned the dangers of asphyxiation if a passenger train were to stall in the Woodhead Tunnels, though this was not wholly folklore. Between 1910 and 1914, there were three instances of westbound train crews being overcome by smoke in the tunnel and the driverless trains running away on the downhill gradient as far as Torside, where they were diverted into a siding fitted with a very substantial stop block. Runaways on this section of the line continued, even after the line was electrified.

After another accident at Hexthorpe near Doncaster in South Yorkshire in 1886, the workers of the MS&LR offered to contribute a day's wages to help cover the costs resulting from the accident. The Board of the Railway declined this offer, considering it unfair to their workers.

The Trans-Pennine rail route of the Manchester, Sheffield and Lincolnshire Railway is now part of the central section of the Trans-Pennine Trail.

== See also ==
- List of British rail accidents

== Notes ==
=== Printed sources ===
- Allen, Grant (1884). Biographies of Working Men.
- Baxter, Bertram (1982a). Baxter, David (ed.). British Locomotive Catalogue 1825–1923. Vol. 3B: Lancashire and Yorkshire Railway and its constituent companies. Ashbourne, Derbyshire: Moorland Publishing Company. ISBN 0-903485-85-0.
- Dow, George (1985) [1959]. Great Central, Volume One: The Progenitors, 1813-1863. Shepperton: Ian Allan. ISBN 978-0-7110-1468-8. OCLC 60021205.
- Dow, George (1985) [1962]. Great Central, Volume Two: Dominion of Watkin 1864–1899. Shepperton: Ian Allan. ISBN 978-0-7110-1469-5. OCLC 655324061.
- Earnshaw, Alan (1996). An illustrated History of Trains in Trouble. Atlantic Transport Publishers. ISBN 0-906899-69-9.
- Marshall, John (1969). The Lancashire & Yorkshire Railway, volume 1. Newton Abbot: David & Charles. ISBN 0-7153-4352-1.

=== Further reading ===
- Rolt, L. T. C. (1978). Red for Danger. Pan Books. ISBN 0-330-25555-X.
- Milnes, Roger; Corry, Christopher (November 1984). "Bullhouse – A Centenary". Forward (48). Great Central Railway Society. ISSN 0141-4488.
- Milnes, Roger; Corry, Christopher (July 1985). "Penistone: Rail disaster coincidence & 100 years on". Forward (52). Great Central Railway Society. ISSN 0141-4488.
