= Newark rail crash =

1870 railway incident in Nottinghamshire, England

- The railway disaster near Newark (The Illustrated London News, 1870)

Details
- Date: 21 June 1870
- Location: Newark
- Coordinates: 53.0725°N 0.7929°W
- Country: England
- Line: East Coast Main Line
- Cause: broken axle

Statistics
- Trains: 2
- Deaths: 18
- Injured: 40

A disaster on the British rail network (Great Northern Railway) occurred on 21 June 1870 when two trains collided at Newark in Nottinghamshire, England, killing 18 passengers and injuring 40 others. The investigation found that an axle had broken on the goods train, and the excursion train collided with the debris on the track.

== Investigation ==
The crash was examined by Captain Henry Tyler of the Railway Inspectorate, and he was able to pinpoint the disaster in a broken axle on one of the goods wagons of the first train. The engine driver stopped his train when he discovered that several rear wagons had suddenly derailed, one of which blocked the adjacent line. He then saw the second train approaching at speed on the next line, and tried to warn him, but to no avail. The passenger train collided with the wagon across the line, the fatalities occurring in several of the lead carriages.

The broken axle was examined by Tyler, and he found that it had cracked from the edge into the centre in a progressive way. The age and history of the axle were unknown, despite Tyler's own attempts to encourage railway companies to keep records of axles and their mileage.

== Axle fractures ==
The sudden failure of vehicle axles bedevilled the railways from their very beginning, a notorious example being the terrible Versailles train crash of 1842, when almost 100 passengers were killed. They continued to fail for many years on all railways, causing yet more disastrous accidents. Another derailment had occurred the previous year of 1869, for example, in the Dalton Junction rail crash. Fatigue was the basic cause of the problem, but the hairline cracks characteristic of fatigue are very difficult to detect, and were frequently missed, until they became critical. Some of the first systematic studies of the problem were undertaken by William John Macquorn Rankine, and later by August Wöhler, who showed how fatigue cracks are started (as surface defects) and grow with each loading.
