= Newport rail accident =

1907 railway incident in Wales

Coordinates: 51°34′9″N 3°0′26″W

Details
- Date: 28 September 1907
- Location: Newport, Monmouthshire
- Country: Wales
- Line: South Wales Main Line
- Incident type: Collision
- Cause: Signaller's error

Statistics
- Trains: 2
- Deaths: 1
- Injured: 12+

The Newport rail accident occurred near Newport, Wales on Saturday night, 28 September 1907. A mineral train from Rogerstone to Cardiff and a passenger train from Cardiff collided near the Ebbw Junction, killing 1 and injuring at least 12. The passenger train left Cardiff at 19:42.

The one fatality was Albert Workman - the driver of the mineral train - a married man with two children. Also injured was Ernest Day, aged 24, of Cardiff, fireman on the mineral engine. The passenger train was travelling at 50 mph (80 km/h) at the time. The driver and fireman on the express train were thrown from their engine by the force of the impact, as was the fireman of the mineral engine. A number of passengers were also slightly injured.

According to the Board of Trade report, the accident was caused by the signalman in Park Junction signal box pulling the wrong lever. This allowed the heavy goods train onto the down gradient and cross the main line into the path of the passenger train at Ebbw Junction. Even though he realised his mistake and returned the signals to danger, there was not enough time for either train to avoid the collision.

== See also ==
- Lists of rail accidents
- List of British rail accidents
