= Esholt Junction rail crash =

Rail incident

Coordinates: 53.8655°N 1.7082°W

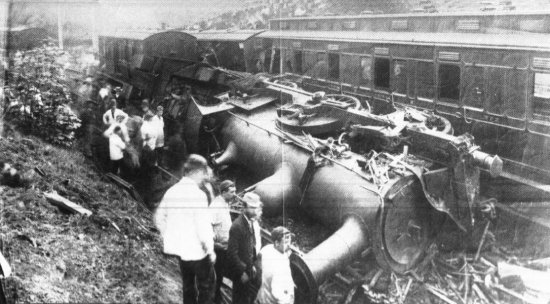

Details
- Date: 9 June 1892; 15:34
- Location: Esholt Junction, Yorkshire
- Country: England, UK
- Line: Otley and Ilkley Joint Railway
- Cause: Signals obscured Defective signalling procedure

Statistics
- Trains: 2
- Deaths: 5
- Injured: 30

The Esholt Junction rail crash occurred on Thursday 9 June 1892, at the point at which the Otley and Ilkley Joint Railway from Ilkley divides, one branch in the direction of Leeds and the other Bradford, a short distance after Guiseley railway station. Two trains collided at around three thirty in the afternoon, resulting in the deaths of five passengers, and injuries to twenty-six more. The driver, fireman and guard of one of the trains were injured, as was a guard on the other train. Although vegetation obscuring a signal was accepted as the primary cause of the crash, a recommendation was made to alter certain signalling procedures at the junction to prevent a recurrence.

The crash arose as three trains neared the junction at much the same time — a common enough occurrence. From the direction of Bradford, a Bradford-Harrogate train was following a route taking it in the direction of Guiseley; from the Leeds branch, a Leeds-Ilkley train was also heading towards Guiseley; whilst in the other direction an Ilkley-Bradford train approached the junction from Guiseley.

Signalman Harry I'Anson, in the Esholt signal box, gave the Bradford-Harrogate train permission to pass the junction; meanwhile in the Apperley signal box, signalman Thomas Aubrey, knowing the Ilkley-Bradford train was approaching, gave the Leeds-Ilkley train permission to proceed towards the junction under a procedure called clause 16, which allowed trains to near the junction under the proviso that they were likely to encounter a danger signal before the junction proper.

At the junction, the Leeds-Ilkley driver, Archibald McLay, despite acknowledging that he had been given a clause 16 permission, and in spite of his four and a half year's service on the line, mistook the proceed signal given to the Bradford-Harrogate train as relating to his line. In fact, his signal was at danger, but obscured by vegetation at the time he looked at it. By the time his train arrived at the junction, it was being crossed by the Ilkley-Bradford train. The Ilkley-bound train ploughed through the last six carriages of the Bradford bound train, overturning the last of these; the engine and tender of the Ilkley bound train also turned over. Five passengers, all on the Ilkley-Bradford train died, one instantly, one on route to and three in hospital. Twenty-six passengers were injured and McLay and his fireman, Walter Bolton, received serious injuries, as did the guard on his train and one of the guards on the Bradford-bound train.

An investigation by Major General C. S. Hutchinson concluded that whereas the immediate cause was the obscured signal, signalling practice at Esholt Junction — specifically clause 16, which allowed trains to approach the junction simultaneously — should be abolished and considered to be a breach of the Regulation of Railways Act 1889. The Bradford junction signal was also repositioned so that it could not be seen from the Leeds line.
