= Lytham rail crash =

1924 railway accident in Lancashire, England

Coordinates: 53.738°N 2.977°W

Details
- Date: 3 November 1924; 17:46
- Location: Lytham St Annes, Lancashire
- Country: England
- Line: Blackpool Branch Lines
- Operator: London Midland and Scottish Railway
- Cause: Locomotive failure

Statistics
- Trains: 1
- Deaths: 15

The derailment of a passenger train at Lytham, Lancashire, England occurred when the front tyre of the locomotive fractured. The crash caused the loss of 15 lives. The accident happened on 3 November 1924 to the 4.40 pm Liverpool express travelling to Blackpool at 5.46 pm. When the tyre failed, the train was moving at about 50 mph (80 km/h), and the train derailed at a crossing, then hit a bridge, closely followed by the Warton signal box. The building was completely demolished and coals from the grate ignited a carriage. The engine toppled over together with two of the carriages.

== Investigation ==
Colonel Pringle of the Railway Inspectorate found part of the broken tyre 50 yards (46 m) away in a field, the left-hand leading wheel of the engine having broken. The tread had broken from a large internal blow hole. The defect probably formed during the steel casting operation, and became critical as the tread was worn away. The tyre had been made in 1920, and had run over 100,000 miles (160,000 km) before failure. All the other wheels from the same batch were removed from service and broken up, but no other cavities were found in the treads. Pringle also showed how tyre fractures had decreased over the years. In 1880, there were 1,238 broken tyres, 10 years later and by 1900, the number had dropped to 234. The majority were found on wagons, but by 1920, there were only 20 wheel failures. The drop in failure rate was due to the introduction of the monobloc steel wheel and better inspection and maintenance methods.

== See also ==
- List of British rail accidents
- Lists of rail accidents
