= Dalton Junction rail crash =

Night mail train crash 28 December 1869

- Location in North Yorkshire

Details
- Date: 28 December 1869
- Location: Dalton-on-Tees, North Yorkshire, England; 354 km (220 mi) N from London, England
- Coordinates: 54.462°N 1.548°W
- Country: United Kingdom
- Line: North Eastern Railway
- Service: Mail train
- Incident type: Train derailment
- Cause: Fractured axel

Statistics
- Trains: 1 with 11 cars
- Injured: 1

A derailment of a night mail train from Scotland to London occurred on the North Eastern Railway when a tender axle suddenly fractured on 28 December 1869 near Dalton Junction, south of Darlington, England. There were only slight injuries among the staff, but the accident was a warning of the problem of premature axle failure.

== Sequence of events ==
The train consisted of engine and tender, five carriages, two post office vans, and two brake vans. It left Darlington at 8.25 pm, and after about 4 miles (6.4 km), and moving at 40 miles per hour (64 km/h) towards Dalton Road bridge, the driver felt a sudden shock at the back of the engine. On looking around, he saw fire flying from the tender, and shut off the steam. The fireman could not apply the tender brake since the step to the brake had broken in the incident. The driver whistled for the guard's brakes, but did not reverse the engine for fear of damage to the carriages behind. The engine came to a dead stop in 220 yards from the point of alarm, and both guards and firemen went to the nearest stations to alert any oncoming trains of the blockage to the line. The engine was undamaged, but the tender had lost both leading wheels, axle and axle-boxes, although it was upright with the other four wheels intact, but off the rails. Most of the following vehicles were more or less damaged and off the track, damage being mainly confined to the wheel assemblies, but injuries were minimal, with only one passenger complaining. Six post-office clerks were "considerably shaken".

== Investigation ==
The tender axle was eventually found in four separate pieces, having fractured across the shaft, and the rails were severely damaged as well.

The axle was made of best Low Moor wrought iron, and had run about 220,000 miles (350,000 km) during its 7 years service (experience had shown that these axles could last up to 10 years or 300,000 miles (480,000 km)). The fracture surface of the principal break showed what is now called a slow growth region on the outer part of the diameter, with a fast growth section at the centre. Although Captain Tyler of the Railway Inspectorate did not recognize the problem as fatigue, he had seen many similar fracture surfaces in his career and attributed the break to the two keyways machined into the outer surface of the axle. He was quite right. The fatigue cracks probably grew from one or more of the sharp corners of the keyways, extending slowly around the circumference until the axle could no longer support its load, and the crack (or cracks) grew catastrophically. The load on an axle is complex, but involves both bending from the load in the vehicle above, and torsion from the rotation of the axle. He suggested that three or four keyways rather than two be used, effectively spreading the load. Nowadays, the sharpness of the corners would also be reduced, thereby lessening the stress concentration. Axles with thicker shafts were produced after this accident, and their use would also have helped to lower net stresses in the axle.

== See also ==
- List of rail accidents in the United Kingdom
