= 2026 Bedford train collision =

Fatal rail incident in central England

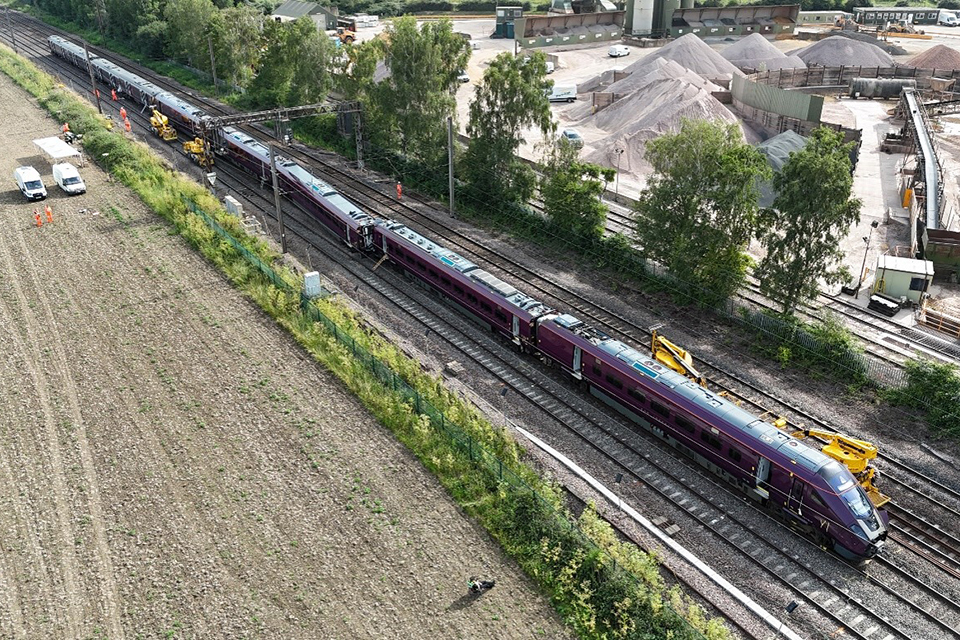
Trains involved in the collision (looking northwards):
1 / Service 1B67 from Nottingham	2 / Service 1H46 from Corby
- Approximate location of collision (map data)

Details
- Date: 19 June 2026 c. 17:13 BST
- Location: Elstow, Bedfordshire, England
- Coordinates: 52°06′02″N 0°28′48″W; TL 042 458
- Line: Midland Main Line
- Operator: East Midlands Railway
- Incident type: Rear-end collision
- Cause: Under investigation

Statistics
- Trains: 2
- Vehicles: 810015; 360115
- Deaths: 1
- Injured: 162 (including 8 critical, 2 very serious, 32 serious, 57 minor)
2026 Bedford train collision

The 2026 Bedford train collision occurred on 19 June 2026, when two East Midlands Railway trains collided on the Midland Main Line south of Elstow, near Bedford, England. One train driver was killed and over 160 people injured. An initial examination stated that the collision occurred after one train stopped on the line unexpectedly due to an Automatic Warning System fault causing it to brake. It was then hit from behind by the second train that had passed a red stop signal protecting the stationary train in front.

== Collision ==
Two southbound passenger trains operated by East Midlands Railway collided at Elstow, south of Bedford, at around 17:13 on 19 June 2026. The first train to stop on the line was the 15:50 Nottingham to London St Pancras service 1B67, a five-car Class 810 Aurora unit; the second train was the 16:40 Corby to St Pancras service 1H46, operated by a four-car Class 360 Desiro unit.

== Casualties and emergency response ==
The driver of the Corby train was pronounced dead at the scene. One hundred and sixty-two people were injured, of whom 102 needed hospital treatment. Eleven people sustained very serious injuries, 32 were seriously injured, and 57 received minor injuries, some of whom were treated at the scene. Six or seven air ambulances were sent to the incident, along with more than 20 road ambulances and emergency response volunteers from the Salvation Army. More than 70 firefighters and officers attended the scene. The train manager on the Corby train, who was also injured in the crash, was praised by passengers, and by the regional organiser of the RMT, for requesting the closure of the line on the radio and carrying out emergency actions.

One of the injured passengers on the front train from Nottingham was BBC Radio London presenter JoAnne Good, who was treated in hospital for fractured facial bones.

By 22 June, a total of 53 people remained in hospital, with eight in a critical condition. By 26 June, 36 people remained in hospital, with three of them in a critical condition. By 7 July, no patients were in a critical condition.

== Aftermath ==
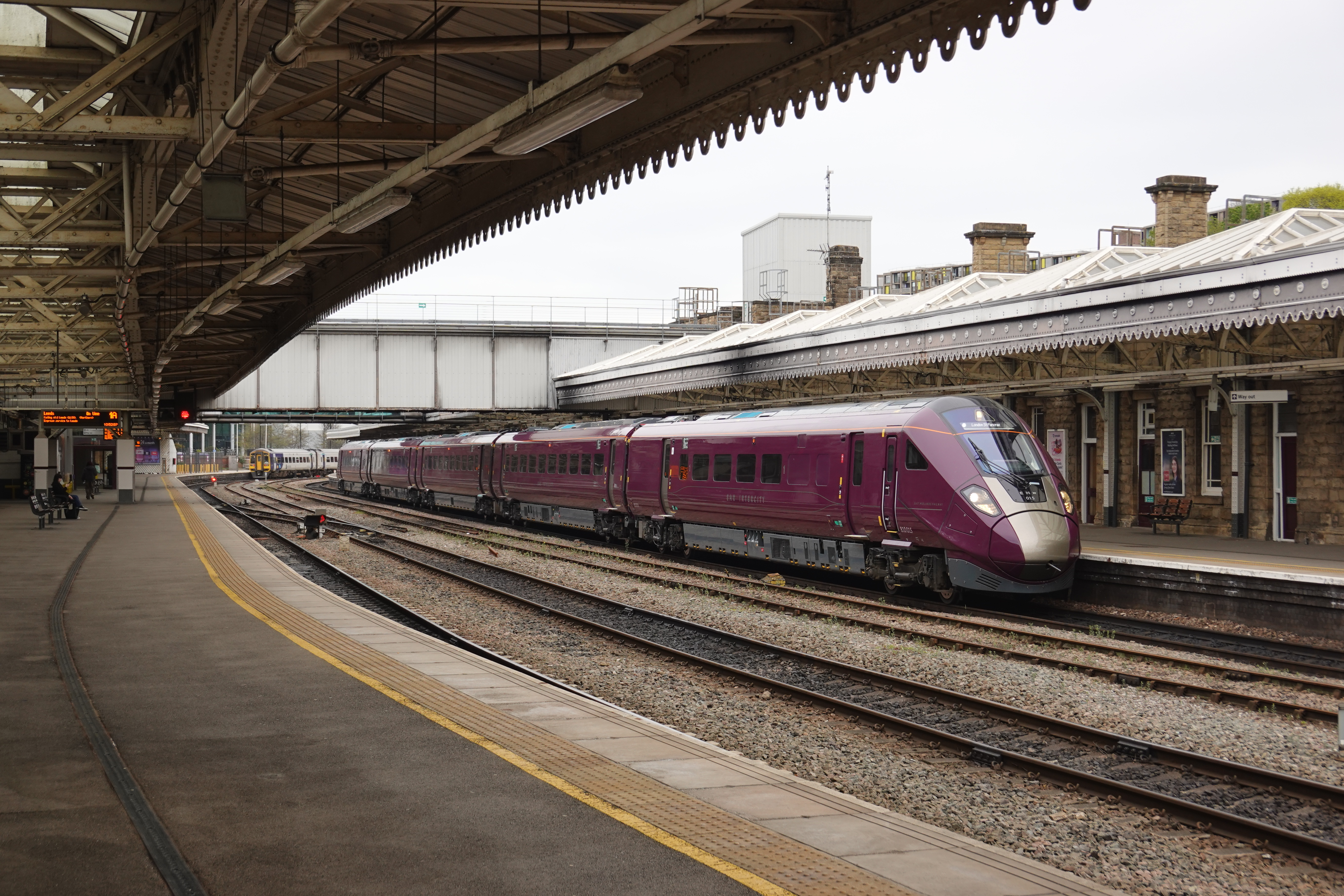
Unit 810015, pictured in 2026

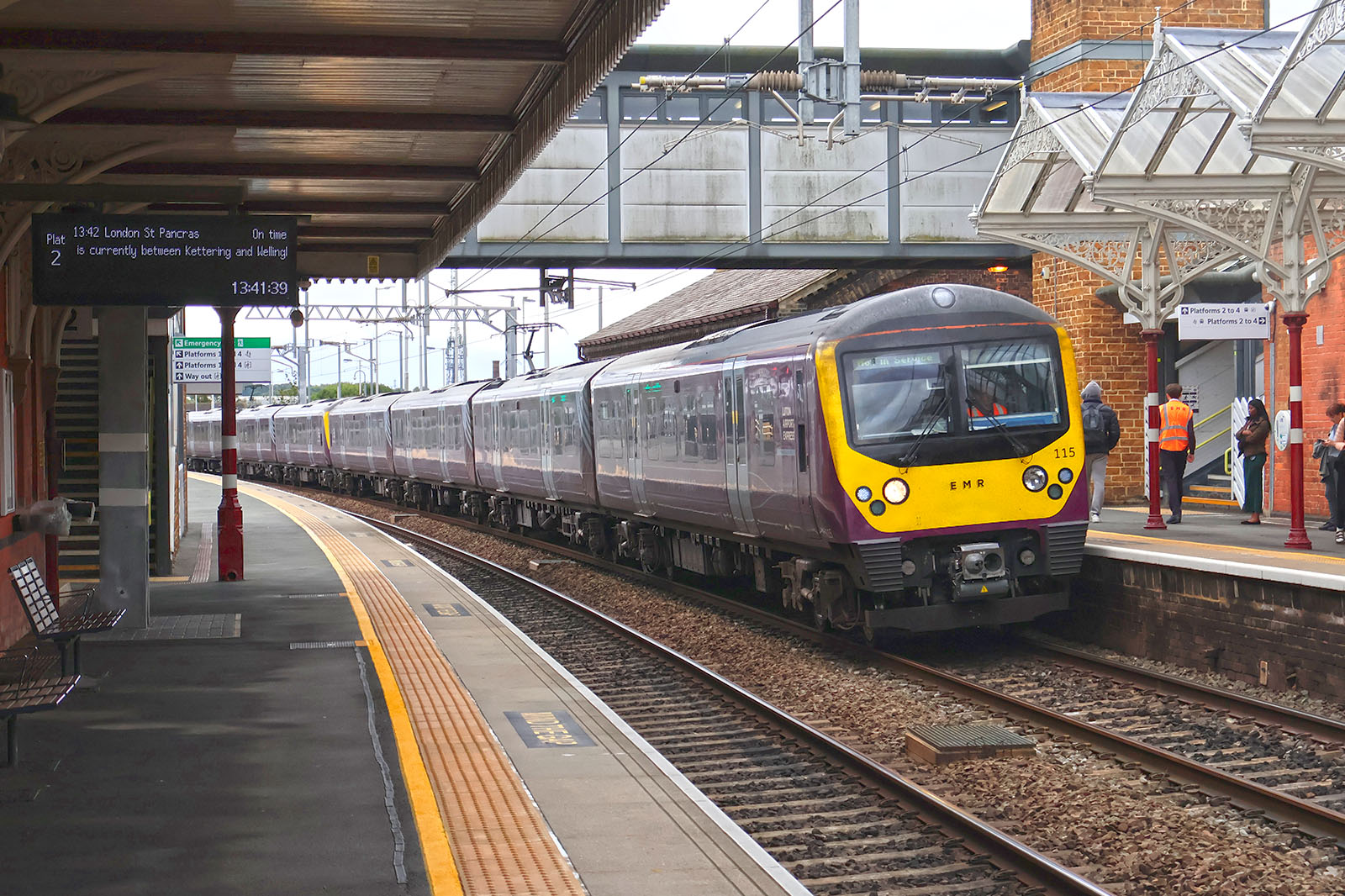
Unit 360115 (in consist with 360106), pictured in 2025

Train services between London St Pancras and Nottingham, Derby and Leicester were disrupted, and passengers were advised not to travel on those routes for the remainder of the day. Greater Thameslink Railway suspended services between Bedford and Luton.

There were planned engineering works taking place on the weekends of 20–21 June and 27–28 June between Bedford and London St Pancras, meaning the line was to be closed anyway. However, due to the collision, train services on the line were suspended between Luton and Bedford from 19 June until 28 June at the earliest.

Recovery of the carriages of the trains involved started on 21 June. A temporary access road was built, and the overhead lines were temporarily removed. Two 110-tonne Kirov rail cranes were used to transport the vehicles to a position where a road crane could load them onto low loaders for transport from the site by road. Unit 360115 was taken to Litchurch Lane, Derby. In addition, 600 metres (660 yd) of track required replacing. Ellie Burrows, Network Rail Eastern regional managing director described the operation as "complex and challenging".

On 26 June, Network Rail announced that recovery and repair work on the site of the accident had been completed, with services to resume on 29 June.

On 2 July, Rail Minister Peter Hendy met workers and volunteers involved in the aftermath at the Bedford Borough Council offices, to thank them for their efforts following the crash.

In July, the RMT trade union announced a series of strikes on the first three Saturdays in August over safety concerns with the Class 810 trains. The RMT said the dispute began in April, prior to the collision. The union called for the trains to be withdrawn from service until faults had been fixed.

== Investigation ==
Both the British Transport Police and Bedfordshire Police attended the scene of the collision as part of the emergency response, with inspectors from the Rail Accident Investigation Branch (RAIB) and the Office of Rail and Road arriving shortly afterwards. Whilst a full RAIB investigation into the accident remains underway, a preliminary report was published on 24 June.

=== Preliminary report ===
In its preliminary report released on 24 June 2026, the RAIB identified the likely contributing factors. Due to a fault with its onboard Automatic Warning System (AWS) equipment, which caused the emergency brake to apply, the Nottingham service had stopped unexpectedly on the up fast line where it was struck from the rear by the Corby service. The report stated that the Corby service passed a signal at danger (SPAD), which was protecting the Nottingham service. The Corby service had just crossed over to the up fast line as scheduled after stopping at Bedford, and had passed two signals, each displaying a single yellow caution signal ("which signifies that the driver can pass the signal but should be prepared to stop at a red signal ahead"). It was travelling at approximately 76 miles per hour (122 km/h) when a brake activation was made, nine seconds before it collided with the train in front. At impact it was travelling at around 49 miles per hour (79 km/h).

Significant damage was caused to both trains, which also partially derailed.

The full investigation will consider:

- the actions of those involved and any factors that may have influenced them
- the status and performance of the braking, AWS and other safety systems on train 1H46
- the reason train 1B67 stopped
- the status of signal WH154 and its AWS equipment, as well as its positioning, visibility, and conspicuity
- the crashworthiness performance of both trains during the collision
- the emergency response to the accident
- the processes used to assess the risk of overrun at this location, and the effectiveness of any control measures intended to address this
- any relevant underlying factors, including any actions taken in response to previous relevant safety recommendations.

=== Interim report ===
The RAIB published its interim report on 1 October 2026, indicating that the Corby train's driver had continued to accelerate past signal WH154, despite having acknowledged the red signal. Full service brakes were applied 10 seconds before the collision, and full emergency brakes 8 seconds before collision.

No Train Protection & Warning System loops were fitted to signal WH154. Signal WH154 had been evaluated as having a low risk of a Signal passed at danger (SPAD). From record analysis by the Rail Safety and Standards Board for the period 1 January 2026‒19 June 2026, no other train had previously received a red aspect at signal WH154.

The first 999 call was placed at 17:14. The first formal report to the railway signaller of a collision came at 17:19, via a passenger using a track-side railway telephone adjacent to signal WH152.

=== Inquest ===
On 14 July 2026 an inquest into the death of the train driver was opened, and following the reading of a short statement, adjourned pending completion of the other investigations. A pathologist informed the inquest that the driver had received "traumatic injuries to the brainstem and chest".

== See also ==
Other accidents caused by SPADs with significant overrun after driver missed or misinterpreted a signal on AWS-fitted lines:

- Leading to rear collisions – Purley 1989, Southall 1997
- Leading to head-on collisions – Colwich 1986, Cowden 1994, Ladbroke Grove 1999
