= UK railway signalling =

Rail traffic control systems used in the United Kingdom

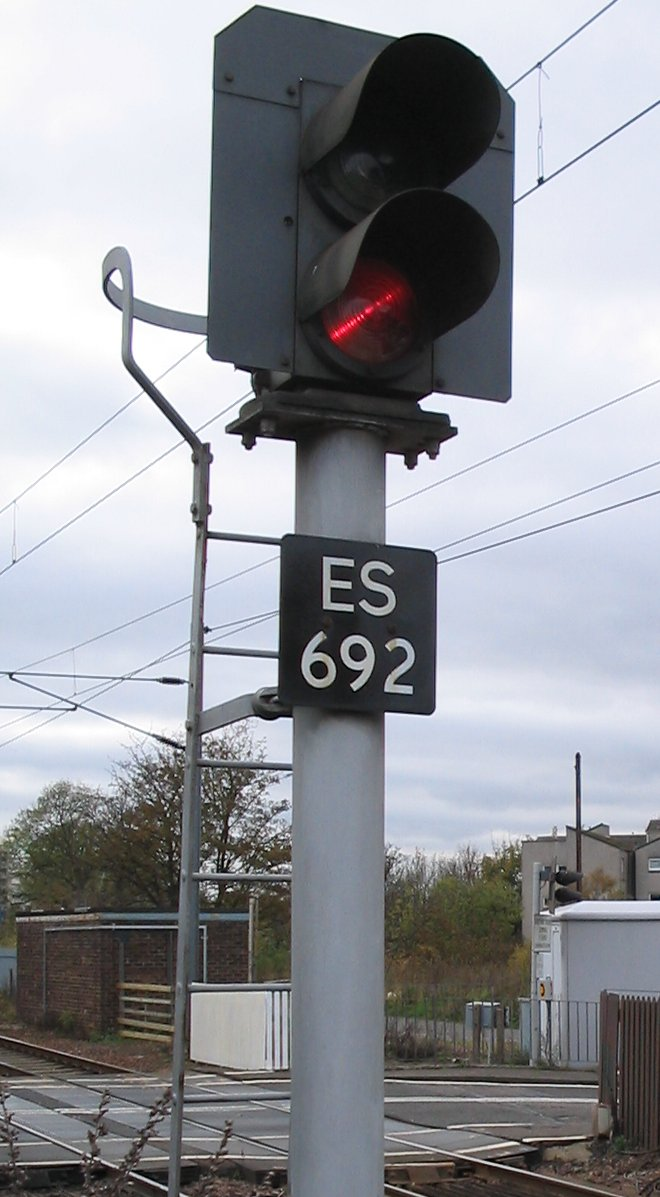
Network Rail two-aspect colour-light railway signal set at danger

The railway signalling system used across the majority of the United Kingdom rail network uses lineside signals to control the movement and speed of trains.

The modern-day system mostly uses two, three, and four aspect colour-light signals using track circuit – or axle counter – block signalling. It is a development of the original absolute block signalling that is still being used on many secondary lines. The use of lineside signals in Britain is restricted to railways with a maximum speed limit of up to 125 miles per hour (201 km/h). This is the maximum speed at which the train can travel safely using line-side signalling; if the train runs any faster, it will not be possible for the train driver to safely read colour-light signalling. Trains operating at speeds faster than 125 mph (for example on High Speed 1) use an in-cab signalling system that automatically determines and calculates speed restrictions.

== Early days ==
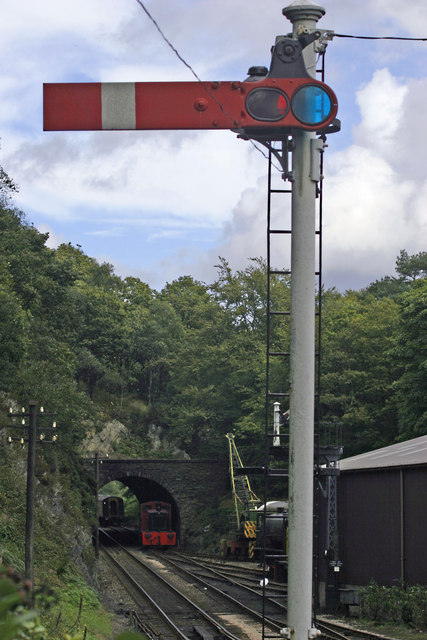
A British Upper Quadrant semaphore signal at the Lakeside and Haverthwaite Railway

In the days of the first British railways, "policemen" were employed by every railway company. Their jobs were many and varied, but one of their key roles was the giving of hand signals to inform engine drivers as to the state of the line ahead. They had no means of communication with their colleagues along the line, and trains were only protected by a time interval; after a train had passed them, a policeman would stop any following train if it arrived within (say) 5 minutes; for any between 5 and 10 minutes after, they would show a caution signal, and after 10 minutes, the line was assumed to be clear. Therefore, if a train failed within a section (as was very common in the early days), the policeman controlling entry to the section would not know, and could easily give a 'clear' signal to a following train when the section was not in fact clear. The number of collisions which resulted from this, as well as the introduction of the electrical telegraph, led to the gradual introduction of the absolute block principle; all systems of working other than this (including time-interval and permissive block) were outlawed on passenger lines in 1889, and all passenger lines were suitably equipped by 1895.

As train speeds increased, it became increasingly difficult for enginemen to see hand signals given by the policemen, so the railways provided various types of fixed signals to do the job, operated by the policemen, or signalmen as they soon became known (it is due to this that British railway slang still names signalmen as "Bobbies"). Many types were devised, but the most successful was the semaphore, introduced in 1841 and soon becoming widespread, although some other types did linger on until the 1890s.

== Running signals ==
The terms "on" and "off" are used in describing British railway signals. When describing an older semaphore, "on" refers to a signal arm in the horizontal position, and "off" means a signal raised upwards or lowered downwards from pivot point (at up to 60°). With regard to newer colour-light signals, "on" is synonymous with the most restrictive aspect, while all other aspects are considered to be "off". A way to remember this is to refer to the state of the red light, or yellow light if the signal is a distant and incapable of displaying a red aspect. If it is lit, the signal is "on", and if the red light is unlit, the signal is "off".

=== Semaphore signals ===
Semaphore stop signal (lower quadrant type)

Semaphore distant signal (lower quadrant type)

Combined semaphore stop and distant signals (lower quadrant type)

The traditional British signal is the semaphore, comprising a mechanical arm that rises or drops to indicate 'clear' (termed an "upper-quadrant" or "lower-quadrant" signal, respectively). Both types are fail-safe in the event of breakage of the operating pull-wire but lower-quadrant signals require a heavy counterweight with push-pull rod between counterweight and arm linkage (generally assisted by the "spectacle" that carries the coloured lenses for use at night) to do that, while upper-quadrant signals fall back to "danger" under the weight of the arm.

During the 1870s, almost all the British railway companies standardised on the use of semaphore signals, which were then invariably of the lower quadrant type. From the 1920s onwards, upper quadrant semaphores almost totally supplanted lower quadrant signals in Great Britain, except on former GWR lines and their succession to BR(WR) and latterly Network Rail Western Zone.

There are two main types of semaphore; stop and distant. The stop signal consists of a red, square-ended arm, with a vertical white stripe typically 9-12 inches (230–300 mm) from the end, and advises the driver whether the line immediately ahead is clear or not. A stop signal must not be passed in the horizontal "on" (danger) position, except where specially authorised by the signaller's instruction. By night, it shows a red light when "on" and a green light when "off" (clear). The green light is usually produced through the use of a blue spectacle lens, which produces green when lit from behind by the yellowish flame from a paraffin lamp.

The other type is the distant signal, which has a yellow arm with a 'V' ("fishtail") notch cut out of the end and a black chevron typically 9-12 inches (230–300 mm) from the end. Its purpose is to advise the driver of the state of the following stop signal(s); it may be passed in the "on" position, but the driver must slow their train to be able to stop at the next stop signal. When "off", a distant signal tells the driver that all the following stop signals of the signal box (and/or until the next distant) are also "off", and when "on" tells the driver that one or more of these signals is likely to be at danger. By night, it shows a yellow light when "on" and a green light when "off". On many branch lines and short block sections, a distant signal was often fixed at 'Caution', standalone or mounted below a Stop semaphore, and so exhibited only a yellow light at night.

Where a signal consists of a combination of a stop and distant arms a mechanism is included to prevent the distant arm clearing while the stop arm is at ‘danger’.

Current British practice mandates that semaphore signals, both upper and lower quadrant types, are inclined at an angle of 45 degrees from horizontal to display an "off" indication.

=== Colour light signals ===
Clearing sequence from red to green of a 4 aspect colour light signal

In total, colour-light signals in the UK display seven aspects. These are:

- Green – Clear. The train may proceed subject to any speed restrictions applying to the section of line or to the train itself. (See also Flashing Green below.)
- Double yellow – Preliminary caution. The next signal is displaying a single yellow aspect.
- Flashing double yellow – indicates that the next signal is showing flashing yellow.
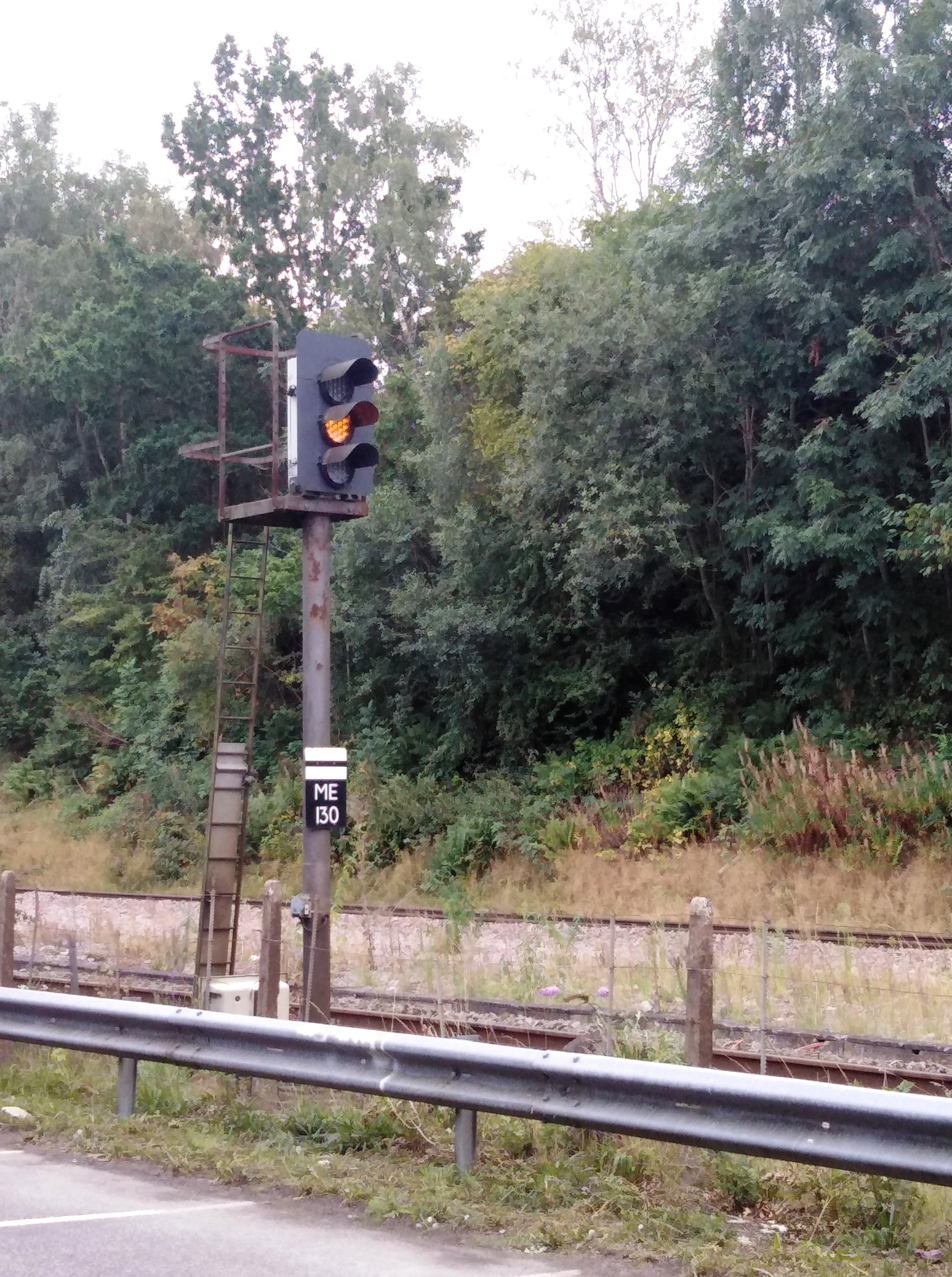
- A caution signal at ME 130 at Beaconsfield Station
  Single yellow – Caution. The driver must prepare to stop the train at the next signal.
- Flashing single yellow – warns that a diverging route is set. The next signal will be a steady single yellow with a junction indicator.
- Red – Danger/Stop.

Additionally, on the 140 miles per hour (230 km/h) trial section of line between Peterborough and York:

- Flashing Green – the train may proceed at line speed. Where this aspect is in use, the steady green aspect means that the next signal shows double yellow.

The green aspect and the four yellow aspects are known as 'proceed aspects', as they allow the train to pass the signal; the red aspect requires the train to stop.

Two-aspect systems use pairs of signals, as a follow-on from semaphores, with the rear signal in the pair using yellow and green only as a caution signal, and the signal in advance of that using red and green only as the corresponding stop signal. Three-aspect systems include yellow. Four-aspect signalling, which also includes double yellow, is mostly used on busy routes to allow shorter headways, and on fast routes to provide longer braking distances.

==== Flashing yellow aspects ====
Diverging route signalling – the driver must slow down and be prepared to stop at the red signal.

A flashing single or double yellow aspect indicates that a train is to take a diverging route ahead with a lower line speed than the main route. A flashing double yellow (only used in 4-aspect signalling) means that the next signal is showing flashing single yellow. A flashing single yellow means that the next signal at the junction is showing (steady) single yellow with an indication for a diverging route, and the signal beyond the junction is at danger (red). This sequence of increasingly restrictive aspects forces the driver to slow the train down in preparation for stopping at the red signal, and this ensures that the train crosses the junction at the appropriate speed. As the train nears the junction, the red signal beyond may 'step up' to a less restrictive aspect depending on the state of the line ahead.

The two yellows in a flashing double-yellow flash in unison rather than alternately, but the flashing double-yellow and single-yellows are not synchronised.

Flashing yellow signalling contains an additional safety vital relay typically referred to as Flashing Lamp Proving Relay (FECR) – this changes over the supply for the yellow signal transformers at each signal where flashing aspects are provided from a steady 110Va.c. to a "flashing" supply switched on and off at about 1.2 Hz or 70–72 c.p.m., once the junction points have been set, locked and detected correctly for the lower–speed divergence.

This supply has to be specially provided, either from the power–box or control centre, or by a specially designed signal control module in more modern LED installations. The increased complexity in providing flashing aspects prior to the introduction of solid state interlocking resulted in more stringent criteria for the use of flashing aspects in earlier installations.

==== Failures ====
If a signal is to malfunction and not show any aspect, the driver is required to treat the blank signal as if it was red and contact the signaller.

A failure of the changeover relay to switch on the flashing indication to the double-yellow aspect would not be a problem as it is considered that a steady double-yellow followed by a flashing single-yellow aspect sequence is acceptable.

However, safety circuitry is connected to the single-yellow flashing supply to ensure that a failure of the single-yellow to change over to the flashing supply would abort the "approach release from yellow" sequence and re-impose the normal "approach control from red" sequence as failure of the single yellow to flash following a flashing double-yellow is considered potentially very dangerous.

==== Lens placement and alignment ====
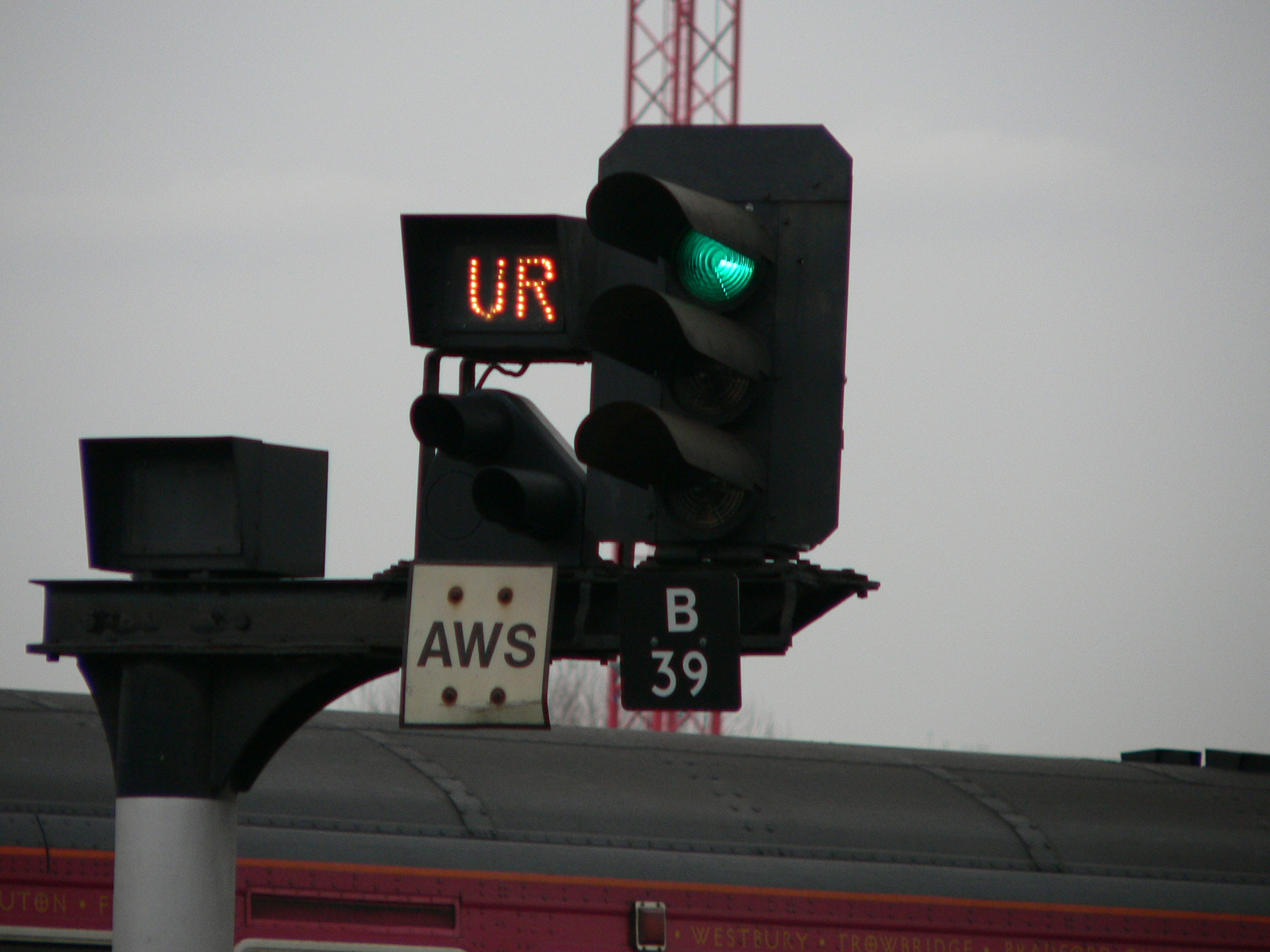
A three-lens signal, showing a green 'Proceed' aspect on top.

The design considerations determining the familiar arrangement of roadway 'traffic signals', with red at the top, do not apply to the railway. In particular, there is no risk that a signal will be masked by a tall vehicle in front of the driver. Furthermore, to position the red aspect at the lowest position may reduce risk of obscuring of that lens by heavy snow or ice. There are standard arrangements of the lights, however unusual variations, such as horizontal mounting is allowed when demanded by local conditions or geography, such as in tunnels, areas of limited clearance, or the presence of bridges over the railway.

On pole- and gantry-mounted railway signals the most restrictive aspect is usually the lowest of the principal aspects. This places the most restrictive aspect nearest to the driver's eyeline and also reduces the possibility of the lens becoming obscured by snow building up on the lens hood of an aspect below. Similarly, on ground-mounted signals the most restrictive aspect is positioned as the highest of the principal aspects; this again places the most restrictive aspect nearest to the driver's eyeline and reduces the possibility of obscuration through snow build up.

In two-aspect signals the green aspect is typically the uppermost and the red aspect the lowest. In three-aspect signals the order, from top to bottom, is typically green-yellow-red. In four-aspect signals the order is typically yellow-green-yellow-red. The top yellow is only used in the display of the double yellow aspect and the lower yellow is used for the display of both the double yellow and single yellow aspects. Regulations require that a space be present between two yellow lamps for displaying the double yellow aspect.

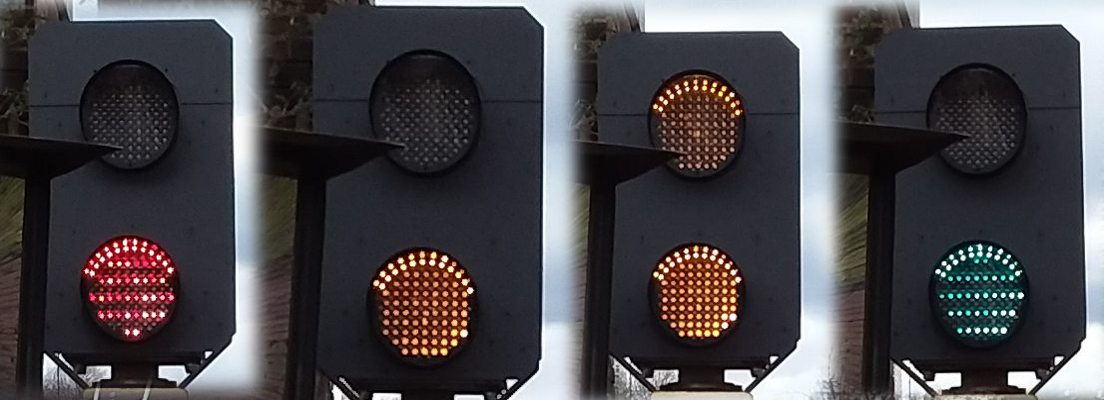
Use of LEDs means that four aspect signals can be achieved with only two apertures.

Searchlight signals were utilized from the early days of colour light signals, alongside early vertically arranged signal heads in early 1920s. These have a single lamp in front of which is placed either a red, yellow, or green filter to show the respective aspect. The filter assembly is moved by an electro-magnet. For a double-yellow aspect a second lamp is fitted, illuminated only when required. A few traditional searchlight signals (i.e. with moving filter glasses inside) remain in use in the Clacton area. These fell out of favour by the 1960s, being replaced by the multi-lens vertically arranged signals, with searchlight style signals only being allowed in circumstances where the signal lens would allow better signal sighting due to a physical obstructions to sight lines. By 1991, the use of searchlight signals in any future installation was prohibited.

The concept had a renaissance in the 2000s with the advent of LEDs which allow the same aperture to be used to display multiple colours, while eliminating moving parts that could fail on searchlight signals. Similar to the earlier searchlight signals, these LED signals use one aperture to display red, yellow, and green aspects, and a second aperture to display the top yellow of a double yellow where required in four-aspect signalling areas.

When junction indicators are fitted, they are typically placed above the principal aspects of a signal.

Signal positioning guidance aims for a signal to be understood by a driver at a distance between 250–800 metres (270–870 yd) from the signal, with no obstructions within 40 metres (44 yd) and at a height of 2.5 to 3 metres (8.2 to 9.8 ft) above the left-hand rail. Signals are positioned 900–2,100 millimetres (35–83 in) from the inside edge of the left-hand rail. Right-hand signals are used in situations where local conditions make a left-hand placement unsuitable. Ground mounted signals are rarely so critical for alignment (an advantage of ground mounting) and are often used in tunnels, where the relative luminosity of the aspects is much higher.

==== Unusual colour light aspects ====
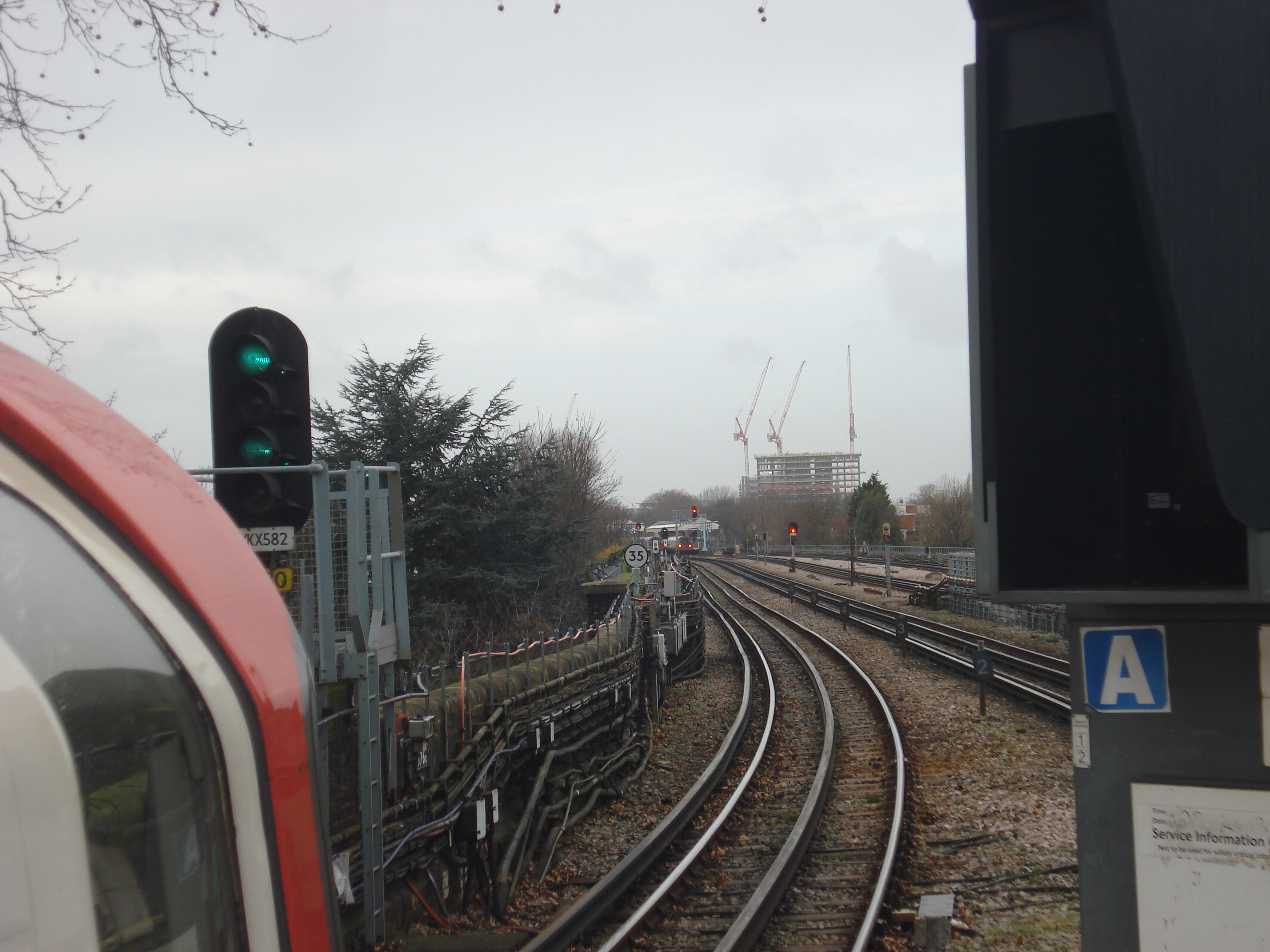
Double green aspect on the London Underground.

- Flashing green – flashing green aspects are employed on the East Coast Main Line north of Peterborough. They were installed for 140 mph (225 km/h) running in connection with the testing of the new InterCity 225 electric trains, with a steady green limiting test trains to the normal speed limit of 125 mph (200 km/h). They no longer have official meaning, but remain in place and there are a couple of locations where the presence or absence of flashing provides useful information to drivers.
- Splitting distants – at some locations approaching a junction two heads are placed side by side. When this signal or the junction signal is at danger, one head is dark and the other shows red or single yellow. When the junction signal is not at danger, both heads show an aspect: the one for the route set ahead of the junction (left or right) shows the correct aspect while the other shows single yellow (or double yellow at an "outer splitting distant").
- Green over yellow, or green over green – the Liverpool Loop Line and London Underground use separate red/green "stop" and yellow/green "repeater" signals. If a repeater signal is at the same location as a stop signal, it is placed underneath it and lit only when the stop signal is green. Thus the order of the heads is (from top to bottom) green, red, green, yellow, and aspects are red, green over yellow, and green over green.
- Yellow over green – this was used in the experimental "speed signalling" at Mirfield to provide an additional caution. It meant that the next signal was showing double yellow. It was discontinued in 1970.

==== Approach release ====
At certain locations such as the final signal on approach to a terminus station or at a diverging route requiring a large speed reduction, approach release (also known as approach control) may be used. The driver will be "checked down" with a normal signalling sequence (green, double yellow, yellow for a four-aspect area) and the red signal clears when it is proven that the approaching train must have slowed to an appropriate speed for the conditions ahead. Typically for low speed junctions (e.g. 25 mph (40 km/h) crossover on a 90 mph (140 km/h) line), the train will be brought down to nearly standing at the signal before it clears. Approach control is achieved by maintaining the signal at danger until the approach track circuit has been occupied for a specified period of time. After the track circuit has been occupied for the specified period of time, the signal is allowed to "step-up" to the highest available aspect and display the junction indicator where applicable. The length of time required varies on the design of the installation.

Where a junction indicator is used an additional safety precaution ensures that failure of the indicator does not cause an irregular or mutilated display to appear. This can be observed in practice – at Bescot Stadium northbound the signal, when cleared for the divergence for Walsall-bound trains, shows the junction-indicator with a red aspect for 2–3 seconds before the main aspect clears – this is whilst the interlocking proves sufficient elements of the junction-indicator are lit before clearing the main aspect. With route relay interlocking the proving circuitry for the junction indicator is housed locally. With a solid state or computerised signalling this proof has to pass to the main interlocking, hence the additional delay in proving that the junction indicator is lit prior to clearing the main signal.

==== Delayed Yellow Operation ====
In the Absolute Block Signalling System, the signalling regulations provide for trains to be signalled into a section of line where the designated "overlap" past the signal is not clear – the signaller keeps the signal concerned at danger until the train has come to a stand at it, and then the driver must be warned verbally by the signaller that the line is not clear the whole distance to the next signal, then once the signaller is satisfied the driver has understood the warning, they will typically pull off the signal very slowly – the driver understands from this that they are being accepted into the occupied length of line under "Warning" Regulation 4.

In colour light power box operated areas, the "home" signal where "warning" arrangements are in force has a time release similar to approach control from red but the control is more stringent – the signal only clears when the speed of the train is detected to be less than 10 mph and only clearance to single yellow is allowed – this is called delayed yellow operation, and is often found at the approach to large stations where two trains may use one platform.

== Subsidiary signals ==
Subsidiary signals are those which usually control only shunting moves, as opposed to train movements. Under this category come permissive signals and shunting signals.

=== Semaphore subsidiary signals ===
==== Permissive signals ====
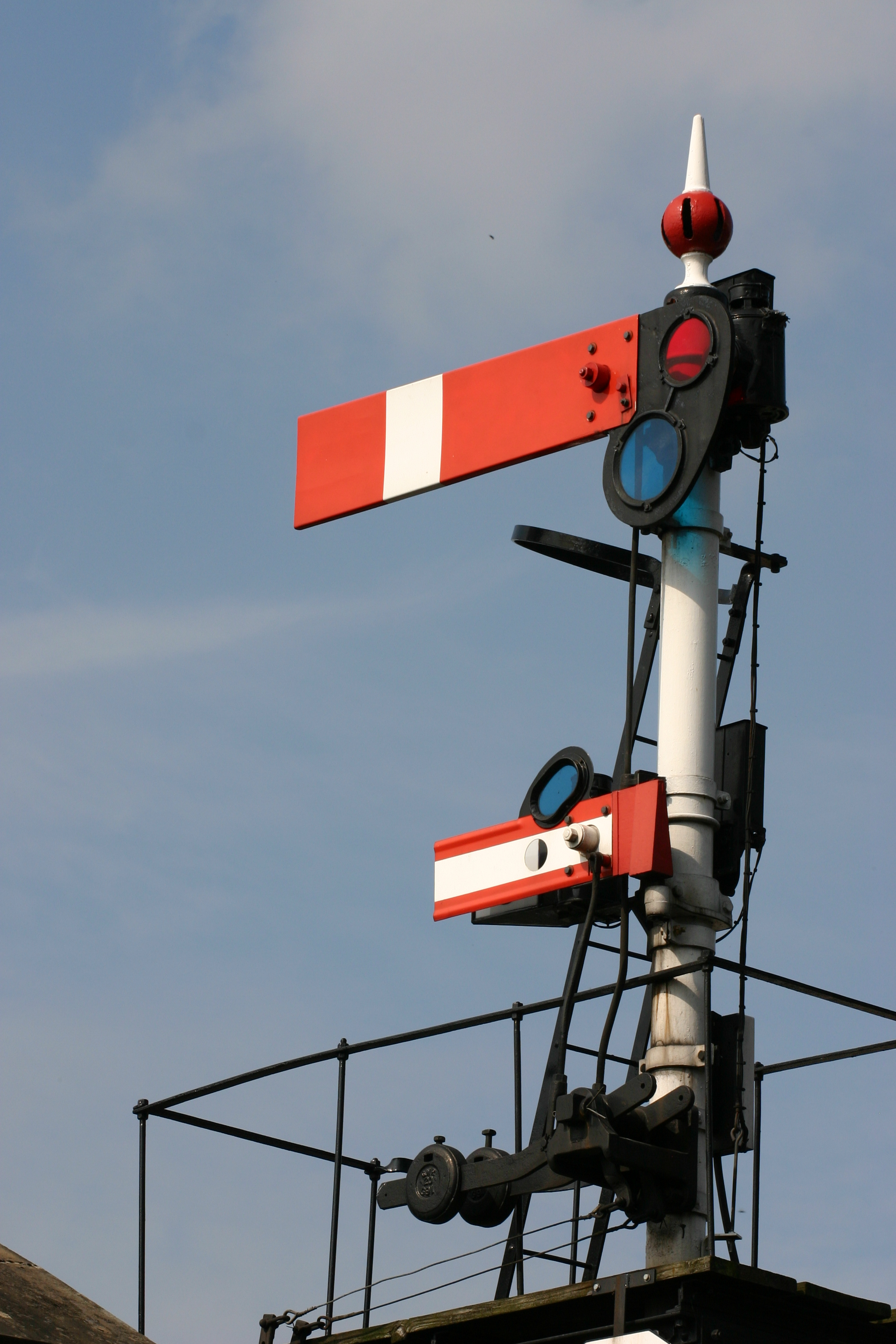
A British lower-quadrant semaphore stop signal with subsidiary arm below

Although British railway operation is based on the block principle whereby only one train is allowed in a signal section, there are situations when another train must enter the section, and permissive signals are used to control that movement. There are three types of permissive semaphore: calling-on, shunt-ahead, and warning signals. Today, all three look broadly the same; they are shaped like a normal semaphore stop signal, though only about two-thirds of the size, and are painted red with a white horizontal band running centrally along them. When "on", they show a small red or white light, and when "off", they display a small green light and an illuminated 'C', 'S' or 'W', depending on their function.

Modern-day colour-light permissive signals consist of two white lights at 45°, normally unlit. When lit, with the main aspect showing red, they instruct the driver to proceed but be prepared to stop short of any obstruction. When unlit, the driver obeys the main signal aspect. They can therefore function either as calling-on or shunt-ahead signals, depending on their location (the Warning Arrangement in colour-light areas, uses the main aspect in a similar fashion to approach release junction signalling, in this case it is called a Delayed Yellow ).

Calling-on signal

The calling-on signal is by far the most common of the three types of subsidiary signal. It is mounted under the stop signal governing entry to (usually) a platform and, when pulled off, allows the driver to proceed cautiously for as far as the line is clear (or to the next stop signal). This can allow three basic moves to take place;

1. A second train to run into and exchange passengers at an already partly occupied platform;
2. Additional vehicles to be attached to the rear of a standing train;
3. A locomotive to run into a platform occupied by coaches to be attached to them.

Shunt-ahead signal

The shunt-ahead signal is normally mounted under the signal governing entry to the section ahead, and, as its name implies, allows a train to enter the section and clear a set of points in order to carry out a shunting move.

Warning signal

The warning signal is the most unusual of the three types of British permissive signal. It is, like the shunt-ahead, placed under the signal governing entry to the section ahead, but its function is very different. For a signaller to accept a train, both their block section and the line for a quarter mile inside their outer home signal must usually be clear; the quarter mile is a precaution in case the driver fails to stop in time for the outer home signal. However, it is possible to accept a train under the "Warning Arrangement" if the block section, but not the quarter-mile overlap, is clear. As its name implies, the signaller must stop and caution the driver of the train concerned, and the warning signal simply replaces the signaller's caution where this operation is frequent. Because there is no margin for braking error, the warning arrangement cannot usually be applied to passenger trains: its commonest use is to allow a goods train to run into a section to shunt a siding in the middle of that section, while a train is still occupying the station ahead.

=== Position light signals ===
Associated position light

Ground position light – Ground Position Light

Yellow position light – Shunt Ahead

Limit of Shunt

Position light signals allow a train to move into a section under caution, the line ahead may be occupied so the driver must drive at a speed that enables them to stop short of any obstruction. Modern position lights consist of three lenses in a triangular formation.

Associated position light signals (APLS) are attached to a main aspect signal and are only illuminated when a shunting movement is permitted. When the main signal aspect is red, the position light displays two white lights at an angle of 45° indicating that the driver may pass the signal with caution. When not cleared these signals are unlit, and the train driver obeys the main aspect signal.

Ground position light signals (GPLS), are always illuminated and are located either near the ground or on a post with no corresponding main signal. They can display the following aspects:

- Either two red lights or one white light and one red light in a horizontal arrangement, meaning 'Stop'.
- Two white lights at a 45° angle, meaning 'Proceed'. The driver may pass this signal with caution and a speed that allows the train to stop short of any obstruction.

Shunt ahead signals are fitted with either two yellow lights, or one white and one yellow light. They are usually found at the exits of marshaling yards and sidings, and can be passed at danger for a movement in the direction for which the signal cannot be cleared (e.g. into a headshunt rather than onto the main line). This arrangement removes the requirement for the signal to be cleared every time a shunt is to take place within the sidings without fouling the main running lines. When cleared they display two white lights at 45-degrees and permit movements onto the main line.

Limit of Shunt A limit of shunt signal. consists of two permanently lit red lights in a horizontal arrangement, meaning 'Stop'. No train is allowed to pass this signal as the direction will be against the normal direction of travel. A limit of shunt signal is permanently lit and cannot display any other aspect; there is no lens fitted in the proceed position on these signals.

==== Semaphore and Disc Shunting Signals ====
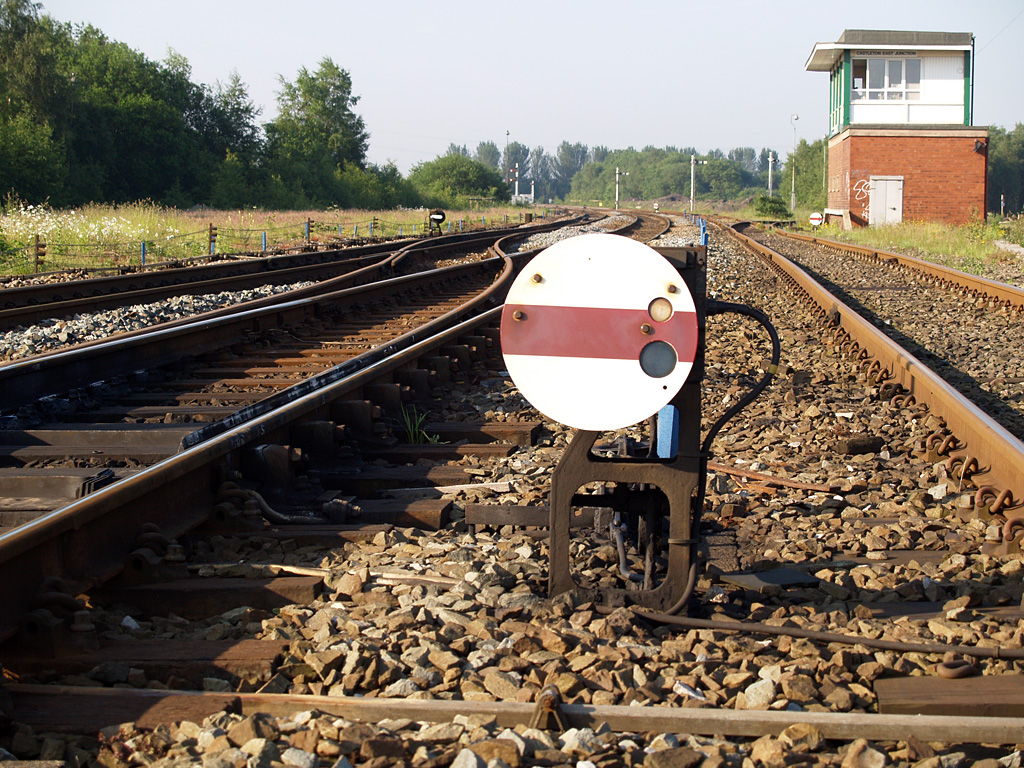
Disc shunting signal

The mechanical equivalents of these shunting signals are found as miniature semaphores (the arms are the same size as those of permissive signals) and disc varieties (the disc is about 12 inches/30 cm diameter). The small-arm semaphores are painted in the same way as a full-size stop signal, while the discs are painted white with a red horizontal band. A small-arm semaphore shows "clear" in the same way as a full-size stop signal, while a disc rotates through 45 degrees or so when pulled off so that the red band is angled. Both display small red or green lights by night.

There are also semaphore and disc equivalents of the yellow light shunting signals; the small-arm semaphores being painted yellow with a black stripe and the discs either black or white with a yellow stripe; by night, they show small yellow lights when "on" and small green lights when "off".

Finally, instead of fixed position light signals, the Limit of Shunt may also be signalled by a simple white floodlit board on which the words "Limit of Shunt" are written in red.

== Junction signals ==
British railway signalling is unusual in that it uses route signalling rather than the speed signalling used by most railways in continental Europe or North America. A driver is informed of which route they will take at a junction, rather than the speed at which they should travel through it.

=== Semaphore junction signals ===
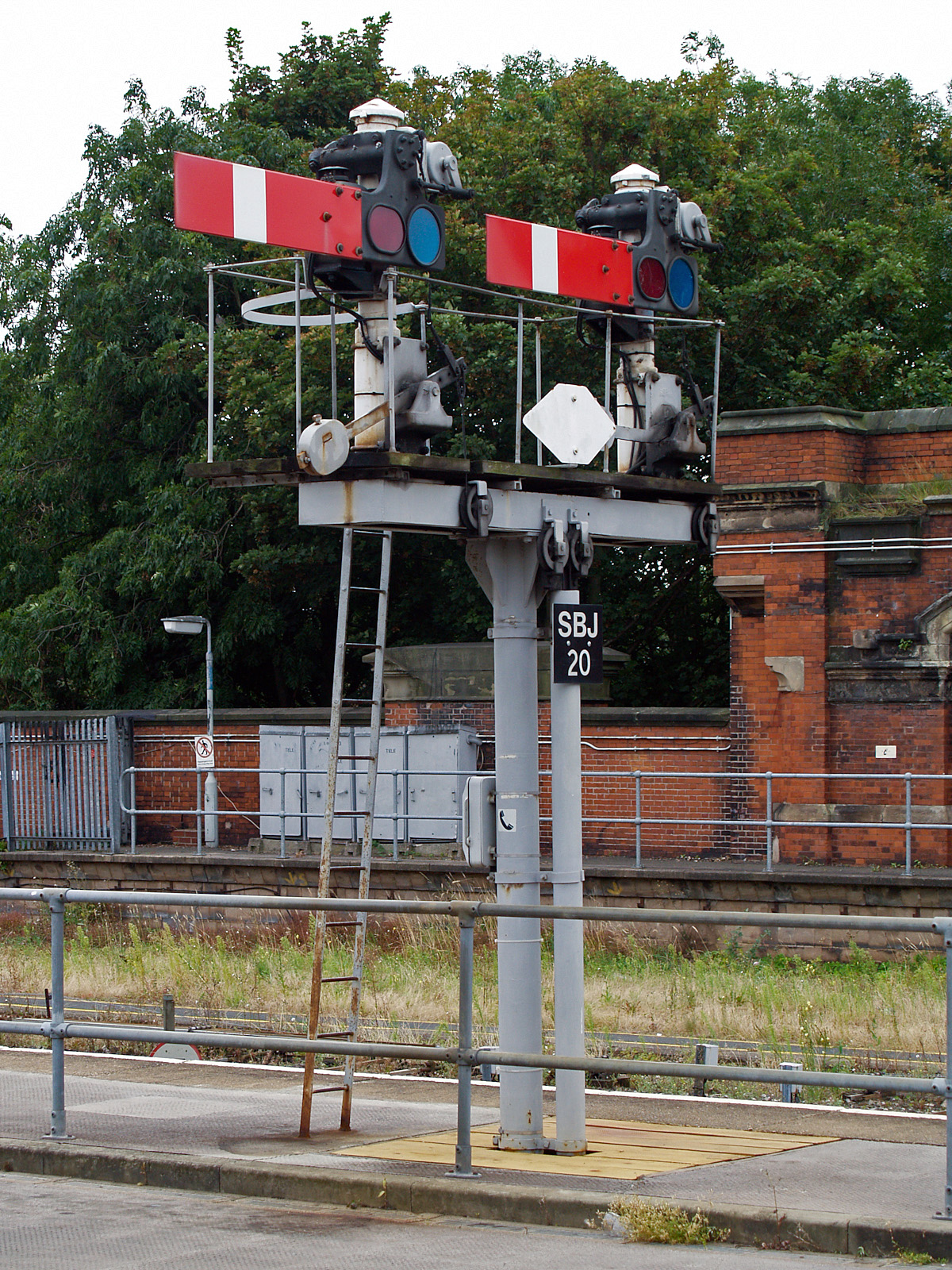
Splitting signals

In semaphore areas, junctions are signalled using a series of between 2 and 5 stop signal arms on one bracket or gantry, known as splitting signals. Each arm (usually) has its own post ("doll") on the bracket, and each arm applies to one possible route. The relative heights of the posts usually convey some information about the lines to which they apply, although there is no definite standard. In some cases, the tallest post applies to the highest-speed route; in others, it applies to what the railway considered the most important route. Traditionally, splitting distant signals would be provided – a series of side-by-side distant signals telling the driver which post on the following stop signal was off; but practice since the 1920s has erred towards providing just one distant which is locked at caution if a large speed reduction is necessary. Drivers of trains must know which signal arm applies to which route, and the speed limit on that route; accidents have resulted from drivers either mis-reading splitting signals or forgetting speed restrictions, and consequently approaching junctions too fast.

Where there is a large number of possible routes, splitting signals are unsuitable because they could easily be confused, and route indicators are used instead. These consist of a black background, mounted under a single stop signal, on which is superimposed a white letter(s), number(s) or combination of the two, to make a code indicating the route to be taken. For example, if the possible routes were to Cambridge and to Norwich, a Norwich-bound train might be shown 'N' and a Cambridge-bound train 'C'. The route code is only shown when the signal is off. In semaphore areas, route indicators may be mechanical, with boards that slide into view to display the code; or electric "theatre-type", with a light projected through a suitably-printed screen.

=== Colour-light junction signals ===
Junction indicator – right route

Junction indicator – First left route

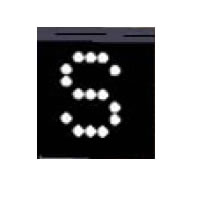
Alphanumeric route indicator.

The colour-light equivalent of a splitting signal is the junction indicator, colloquially known as a "lunar indicator", "feather", or "horn" in Scotland. Mounted above a colour-light signal, they consist of a row of white lights (originally a single, long, u-shaped fluorescent tube in an open-fronted case), nowadays five but traditionally three, angled to the left or right depending on the direction of the divergence. When the highest-speed route is set, the indicator is not illuminated (unless all routes are of a similar speed, in which case there is an indication for each route). When a diverging route is set, the respective junction indicator is illuminated. These can be used where there is a maximum of six routes as well as the 'straight' route, and where a maximum of three routes are to one side of the 'straight' route. Two junction indicators in opposite directions on the same signal are colloquially known as "bunny ears".

Where junction indicators cannot be used, route indicators are also used in colour-light areas. They may take the form of a dot-matrix of white lamps, or, in more recent installations, fibre-optic displays driven from a single lamp to display the route code. At certain locations, no route indication is given for the highest-speed route. As with semaphore route indicators, they are usually restricted to areas where all routes are at low speed, often on the approach or departure from large stations.

In areas where speeds are lower and there are a number of routes which can be taken, alphanumeric (also called theatre-style) route indicators are used to display a number or a letter (e.g. a platform number or line designation) to denote the route the train is to take. They may be located above or beside the relevant signal. When a route is set and the signal is cleared, the relevant letter or number is shown. On shunting signals, where speeds are much lower, a miniature version of the alphanumeric route indicator is used.

When a route is set at a junction that involves the train taking a diverging route that must be passed at less than the mainline speed, a system known as approach release is used. There are a number of different types of approach release that are used on British railways but the most often used is approach release from red. This system has the signal before the diverging junction held at red until the train approaches it, whereupon it changes to a less restrictive aspect with the appropriate direction feather of five white lights. This is required so that the signals approaching show the correct caution aspects, slowing the train down for the junction. While the junction signal is held at red, the preceding signal will be displaying caution (yellow), and the one before that will display preliminary caution (double yellow) if it is a 4-aspect signal. This system allows for a gradual decrease in speed until a safe speed is reached for the train to move through the junction.

Another common system is approach release from yellow with flashing aspects in rear. It is essentially similar to approach release from red, except that the junction signal is released from yellow and the signals in rear will flash to warn the driver that the train will be taking a diverging route ahead. Where the turnout speed is the same as the mainline speed, approach release is not necessary.

== Speed indicators ==
Speed indicators are displayed along a route to ensure a train does not go faster than the maximum permitted speed.

=== Permissible speed indicators ===
In the UK, every section of railway line has a maximum speed, known as the Permissible speed. Table A of the Network Rail Sectional Appendix provides a list of these. Where there is a change in permissible speed on a line, a permissible speed indicator sign will show the new speed. Train crew are expected to know every permissible speed for all the routes they work over as part of their Route knowledge. When the speed limit increases, the rear end of the train passing must completely clear the speed limit sign before the speed limit can take effect. This minimises the risk of derailment.

==== Permissible speed indicator ====
Permissible Speed Indicator

Permissible speed indicator. This example is displaying a maximum permissible speed of 125 mph (201 km/h). If the speed figure is on a yellow disc, it is an "enhanced permissible speed" that only applies to certain trains that are specifically engineered to run at this speed safely, such as tilting trains. If the speed figure is in white numerals on a black disc, it is in kilometres per hour instead of miles per hour.

==== Differential permissible speed indicator ====
Differential permissible speed indicator

The number below the line always shows a higher speed and applies to passenger trains, parcel and postal trains and light locomotives, while the top number applies to all other trains. This example therefore is displaying a maximum permissible speed of 70 mph (110 km/h) for passenger trains, parcel and postal trains and light locomotives, in addition to a maximum permissible speed of 40 mph (64 km/h) for all other trains.

==== Diverging permissible speed indicator ====
Diverging permissible speed indicator

This example is displaying a maximum permissible speed of 40 mph (64 km/h) only for the diverging route to the left. Unless otherwise indicated with another sign, this does not apply to the current route.

==== Warning indicator ====
The original 'Morpeth Board' from 1971 to 1986

Permissible speed warning indicator for 50 mph

Warning indicators are provided whenever there is a reduction in permissible speed of a third or more, and are placed at the service braking distance from the start of the lower speed.

The original version was introduced in 1971, following the 1969 derailment at Morpeth Curve in Morpeth, Northumberland. The original version, consisting of a black circle with a yellow outer ring and numbers, illuminated at night by a floodlight. This design was replaced in 1986 by the current design. However, the original design did carry on into the mid-2000s. Where a speed restriction reduced the permissible speed by one-third or more, when a speed limit is above 50 miles per hour (80 km/h), an audible warning to the train driver via an AWS magnet must be provided. They are colloquially known as 'Morpeth boards', owing to their connection to the Morpeth Curve.

==== Diverging warning indicator ====
Permissible speed warning indicator for 50 mph, with a directional arrow

These indicators warn the driver of a lower speed limit on a route diverging ahead. This example is displaying a maximum permissible speed of 50 mph (80 km/h) on the right diverging route. These warnings are provided whenever there is a reduction of permissible speed of a third or more, and, again, are placed at the service braking distance from the start of the lower speed.

== Speed restrictions ==
=== Temporary speed restriction ===
When it is necessary to carry out planned maintenance or repair work on a line, a temporary speed restriction (TSR) may be installed at a particular location. Train crew are notified of this in the Network Rail issued Weekly Operating Notice, which they are required to read before they book on duty. The current yellow-green reflective sign designs came into use in the mid-1990s, replacing battery powered electric lights that displayed a pair of flashing white lights and an illuminated speed indicator on the warning sign.

TSR warning board

At the service braking distance before the speed restriction, a temporary AWS magnet is installed between the running rails, followed by a yellow speed warning board.

TSR 'Speed indicator' (Left) and a 'Termination indicator' (Right).

At the commencement of the speed restriction there is a yellow speed board, and at the end is a yellow termination board. The train cannot accelerate to the maximum permissible speed of the line until the last vehicle has passed the 'T' indicator, unless a second 'A' ('Accelerate') board is mounted above the termination board.

Repeater warning board

'SPATE' indicator

When there is a station stop between the warning board and the commencement board, a yellow repeater warning board showing an R is positioned beyond the end of platforms to remind drivers of the restriction ahead.

If the advertised TSR is not installed, or is withdrawn earlier than planned, a yellow SPATE ('Speed previously advertised terminated early') board will be set up to inform train drivers that the TSR is no longer in effect.

=== Emergency speed restriction ===
ESR warning indicator

If a speed restriction needs to be imposed before there is time to publish it in the Weekly Operating Notice, an Emergency speed restriction (ESR) is set up. This consists of a temporary AWS magnet and flashing warning indicator (also known colloquially as a 'Dalek' or 'Metal Mickey') placed before the usual temporary speed restriction equipment.

Network Rail will email information about the ESR to specified staff (usually control staff and/or traincrew managers) at Train Operating Companies and Freight Operating Companies who take responsibility for arranging the display of the notice in the designated red-coloured "Late notice case" in train crew booking-on points. Crew are required to check this case when signing on for duty.

If the speed restriction remains in place long enough for it to be published in the Weekly operating notice, it will become a Temporary speed restriction so the Warning indicator and its associated AWS magnet will be removed.

=== Blanket speed restriction ===
A Blanket speed restriction is used when it is necessary for trains to run more slowly over a large area. This is commonly used for weather conditions such as high winds, high temperatures or snow. No trackside signs are put out for a Blanket speed restriction, which enables it to be imposed quickly. Initially train drivers are informed directly by the signaller, and information is faxed to drivers' booking on points where it is posted on the Late notice board.

== Other signals ==
=== Preliminary Routing Indicators ===
Preliminary Routing Indicators (PRIs) are installed on the approach to certain junctions. When the junction signal is displaying a 'proceed' aspect, the PRI will display an arrow. The arrow points up when the highest speed route is set. When a diverging route is set, the arrow points in the appropriate direction (mimicking the junction indicator on the junction signal). This advance indication gives the driver an opportunity to stop before the junction points, if wrongly routed. At the present time, PRIs are few in number, but they are likely to become more common.

=== Proceed on Sight Authority ===
Proceed on Sight Authority is a new concept which introduces an additional aspect to allow the signaller to authorise drivers to pass signals when they are at red due to influences within the interlocking. The signal will notionally be used where the route setting and locking function is still proved to be operable but a function such as train detection or lamp proving of a signal ahead may be failed. The authority will allow the driver to pass the signal and proceed at a speed slow enough that they may stop short of any obstruction (in common with other degraded modes of operation) The term may be abbreviated to "PoSA".

A "Proceed On Sight Authority" is only shown in conjunction with a red main aspect on a main signal and when operated the two white lights in the subsidiary signal flash on and off together to warn the driver they were proceeding under caution only as far as the line can be seen to be clear.

=== Off indicator ===
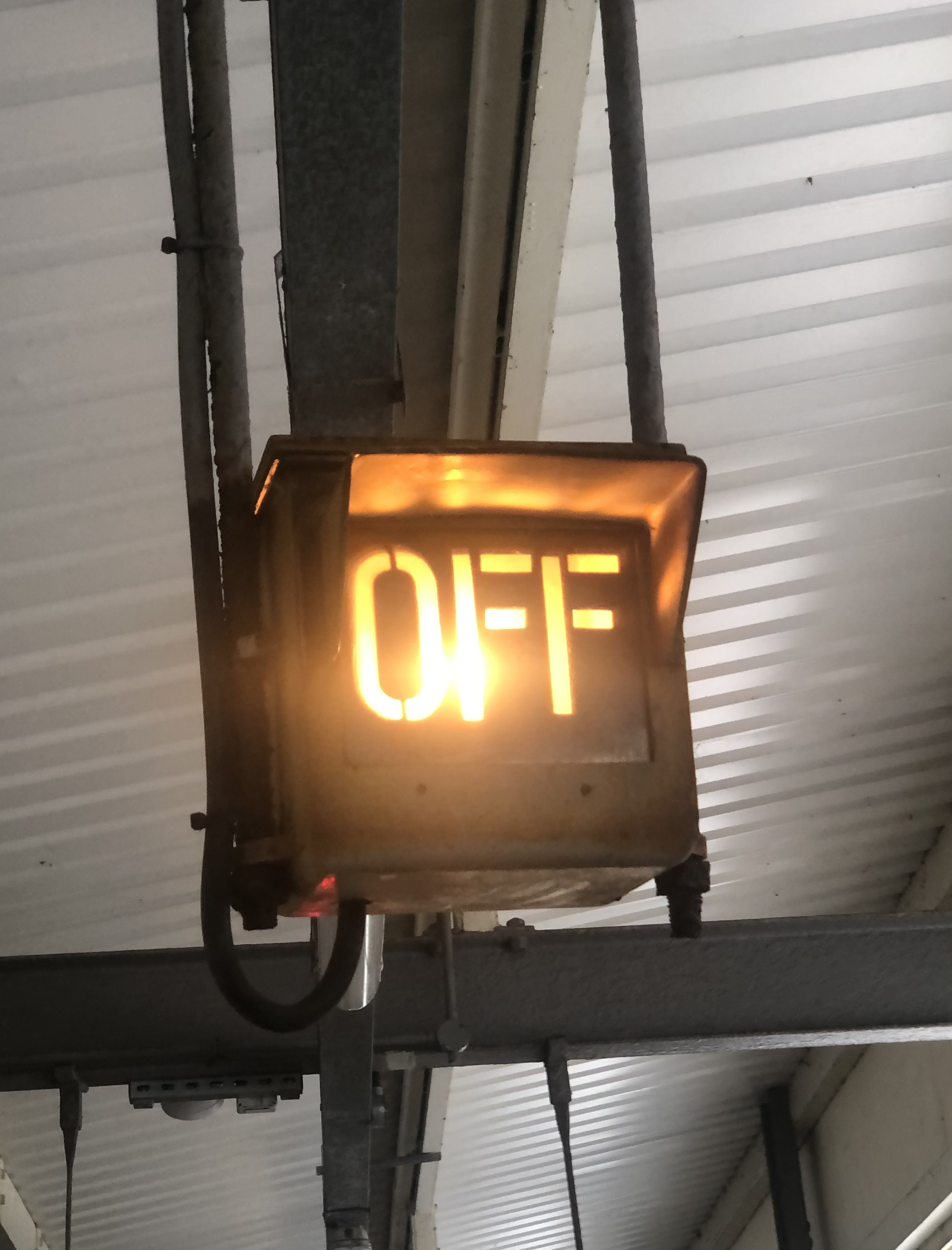
An old style incandescent "OFF" indicator at Brockenhurst, Hampshire

An illuminated off indication means the associated signal is showing a proceed aspect (and is thus not showing a danger aspect, so the signal is considered to be off). Off indicators are mainly installed on station platforms for the benefit of the train-crew and platform staff. When the display is blank, it means that the associated signal is at danger and so the train cannot be despatched. Off indicators are also sometimes supplemented with 'up' and 'down' text on bidirectional lines. An illuminated indication CD (close doors) is an instruction to close the train's power-operated doors. An illuminated indication RA or R (right away) means that station duties are complete and the train may depart.

=== SPAD indicator ===
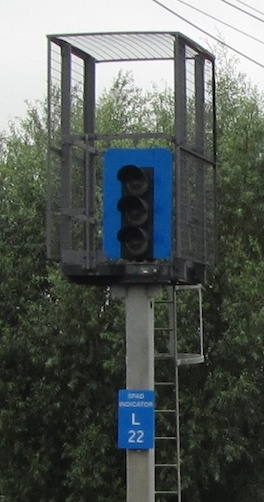
SPAD indicator, near Littleport on the Fen Line, protecting the entrance to a single line

A SPAD indicator is a separate indicator which may be positioned after a main signal where there is a likelihood of a serious collision at a junction if a SPAD (signal passed at danger) occurs at the main signal. They are normally unlit but following a SPAD they display a steady red light between two flashing red lights arranged vertically. Any driver who sees a SPAD indicator illuminated must stop their train immediately and subsequently contact the signaller for further instructions, even if they can see that the signal pertaining to their line is showing a proceed aspect. SPAD indicators are mounted against a blue backplate or surround to prevent confusion with a failed signal, as SPAD indicators are unlit. Initial testing of SPAD indicators occurred in 1994, with the current design being installed in 1996. Advances in train protection systems, especially decision to install Train Protection & Warning System in response to The Railway Safety Regulations 1999, has rendered the SPAD indicator largely obsolete.

=== Banner repeating signals ===
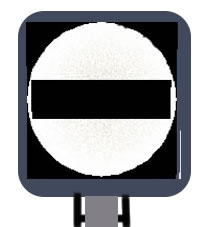
Banner on

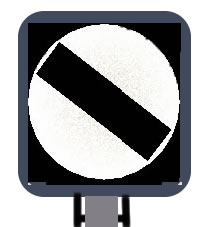
Banner off

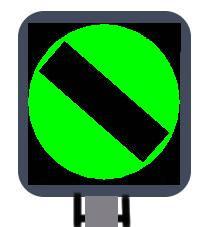
Banner green

Banner repeater signals are provided on the approach to certain signals which have restricted sighting (for example because of curvature of the line, buildings, overbridges or tunnels), to give advance information of the signal aspect. Their meanings are

- Banner on: The signal to which it applies is at danger.
- Banner off: The signal to which it applies is showing a proceed aspect.
- Green banner: The signal to which it applies is showing a green aspect. A banner capable of showing this aspect has a "⦶" symbol on its identification plate.

Typically, banner repeaters were only capable of displaying whether their associated signal was "on" or "off", without the ability to reveal any further information as to the type of proceed aspect that their associated signal was displaying. LED technology in newer installations have enabled the creation of the three-aspect banner repeater, which enables the banner repeater to indicate that the associated signal is displaying a green aspect by using a green surround.

If two or more banner repeaters are placed together, this allows for the repetition of routing indications. Only one banner repeater in such a set will display an off indication for the appropriate route, while a danger signal is repeated by setting all repeaters in such a set to on.

=== Co-acting signals ===
If a particular main signal is difficult for a train driver to see while they are at the signal, then a co-acting signal, which shows the same aspect as the main signal, will be placed near the main signal at a location, usually ground-mounted, and viewing angle that is much easier for the train driver to see. Train drivers must use their route knowledge to determine where co-acting signals can be found.

== Obsolete signals ==
=== Purple lights ===
Used in particular circumstances such as wrong-road or goods lines.

=== Three-position semaphore signals ===
From 1914, a small number of British installations, notably, the Great Western and the South Eastern and Chatham, used motor-operated three-position semaphore signals of North American origin. These worked in the upper quadrant to distinguish them from the two-position lower quadrant semaphores that were standard at the time of their introduction. When the arm was inclined upwards at 45°, the meaning was "caution" and the arm in the vertical position meant "clear". Thus, three indications could be conveyed with just one arm and without the need for a distant arm on the same post. In 1924, a committee from the Institution of Railway Signal Engineers discouraged the three-position signal, however installed examples did last into early 1970s around Keadby Bridge, operating in the three-position manner.

=== Euston to Watford experimental system ===
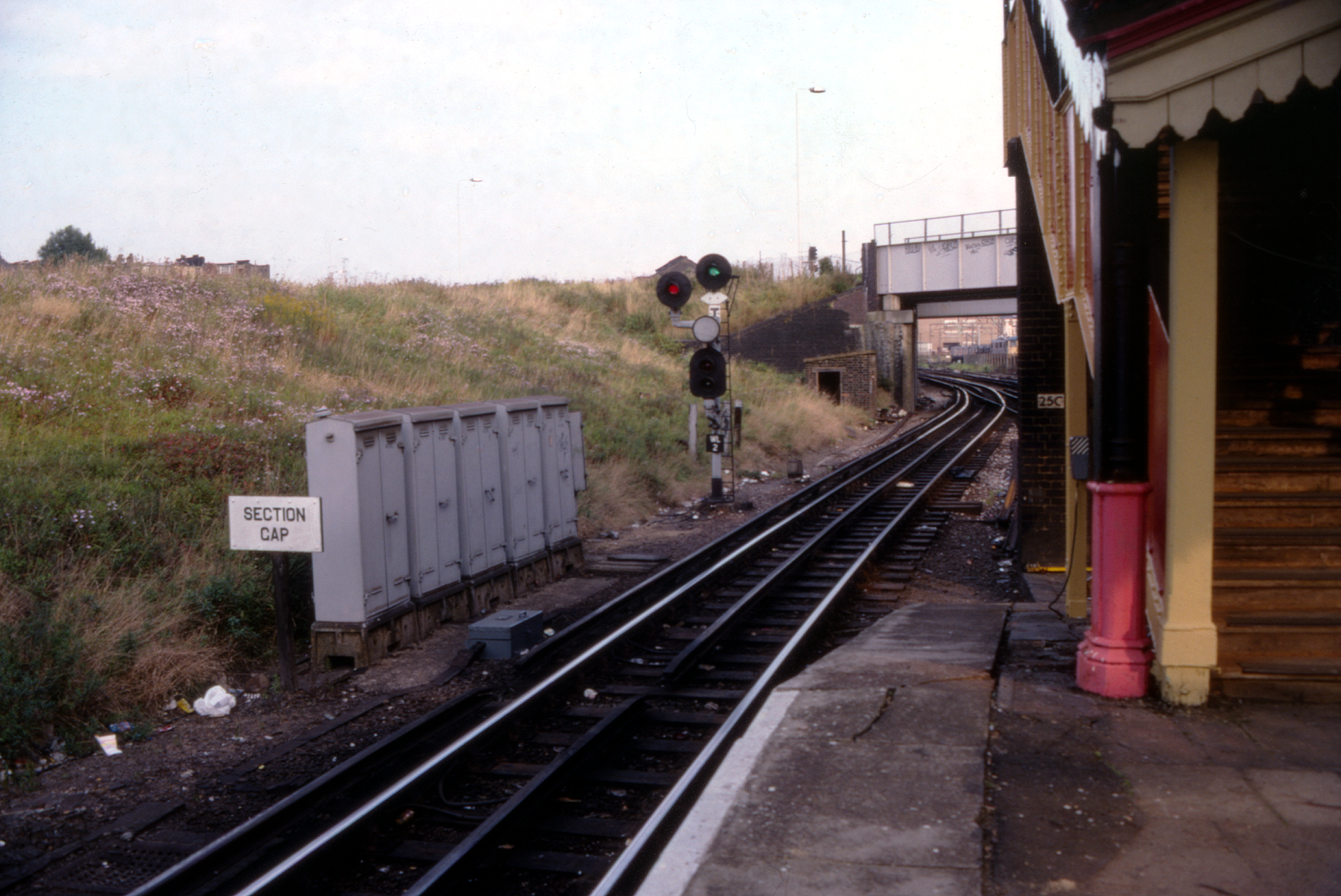
LMS signal at Willesden Junction. The green signal is for the line towards Euston / Elephant & Castle / Broad Street via Primrose Hill. The route to the left with the red signal leads to the North London Line and was used by trains to Broad Street via Hampstead Heath.

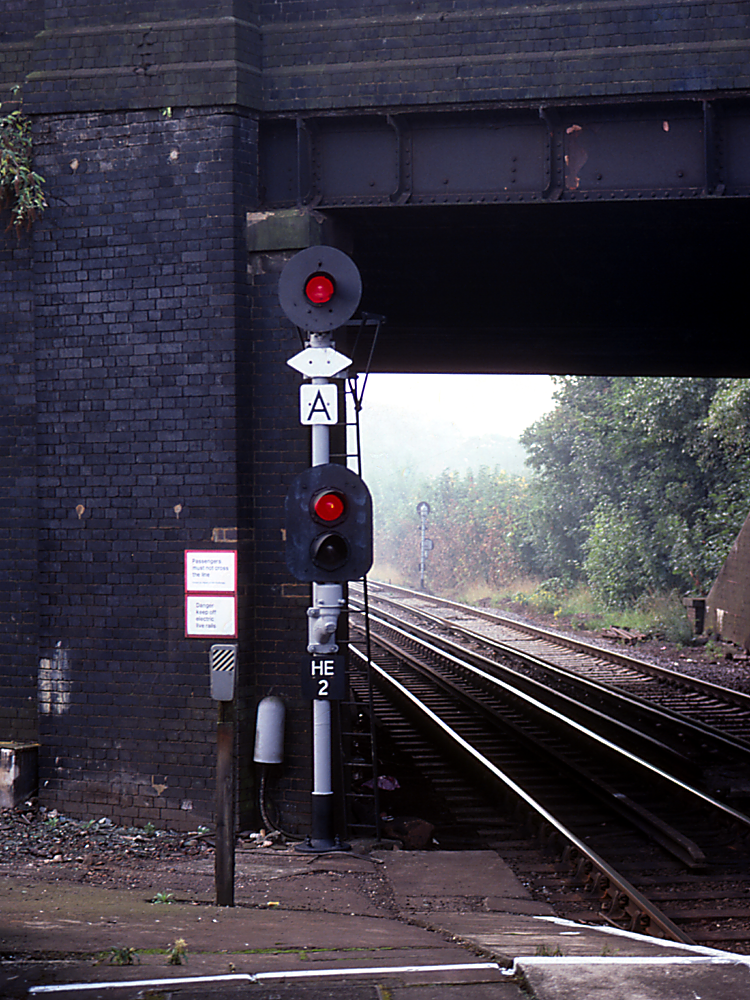
LMS Watford DC New Lines Signal Hatch End Station

This scheme, on the face of it, was a fairly standard colour light system, with each stop signal (which could show red or green) having an attendant repeater signal (showing red, yellow or green – the red used only for when the two stop signals on either side were also red). What made the scheme unusual was the provision of an automatic 'calling on' facility. The stop signals had an additional signal head ('marker light') that featured a red aspect plus a miniature yellow aspect. This marker light was mounted part way up the post. On repeater signals, the marker light was offset to the left-hand side of the post to indicate that the 'stop and proceed' rule applied. Junction stop signals were provided with two main signal heads, one mounted higher than the other. Splitting distant signals had three main heads, the centre one mounted higher than the other two.

When a train stopped at a red stop signal, its presence on the track started a time delay relay. At the conclusion of the time delay, the red marker light was extinguished and replaced by the miniature yellow (the upper red aspect remained lit). The train stop also lowered. The calling on aspect authorised the driver to proceed, but to be prepared to stop short of another train.

The scheme was not considered a great success. In fact, during periods of severe service disruption, it was not unusual to see several trains buffer-to-buffer along the line, though this occurred when the line was much busier than now. Concern was expressed that similar coloured aspects had different interpretations depending on where on the signal they appeared.

The system was finally identified for replacement following an accident at Kensal Green, when a main line train ran into the back of Bakerloo Line train. The driver had apparently mistaken the calling on aspect for a normal yellow aspect (the signal was temporarily operating on a maximum yellow due to track side work). The indications were that the driver was distracted as his pay slip and its envelope were recovered from the wreckage – but this was never proved as the cause. It was also suggested that the driver may not even have checked the indications having observed the fall of the train stop. The entire line was resignalled to the standard colour light system in 1988.

== Warning systems ==
Because of the propensity for heavy fog in some parts of the British Isles, fog signal rules were established on the UK railway system to keep train traffic moving without incurring the severe delays that would be necessary if drivers had to stop or travel slowly up to each signal and read its indication. During heavy fog, fogsignalmen would be stationed at distant signals with a lantern and detonators – small explosive charges that could be strapped to the rail to be exploded by the wheels of a train. The fogsignalman's duty was to repeat the indication of the signal using their lantern; the semaphore arm was usually obscured by fog and hence invisible to the driver of a moving train. If the distant signal was displaying 'caution' (warning that a signal ahead was at 'danger'), the detonators remained on the rail and the fogsignalman would show a yellow lamp to show 'caution'; if the distant signal was clear, the detonators would be removed from the rails and a green lamp would be displayed.

Britain's Great Western Railway introduced the Automatic Train Control (ATC) system in 1906. This system is the forerunner of today's Automatic Warning System (AWS) and consists of an electrical system that sounded a bell in the cab as the train approached a signal at clear. Power was fed through a metal ramp to a pickup on the underside of the locomotive to power the bell. An absence of the electrical voltage on the ramp caused a warning horn to sound in the locomotive's cab. The driver then had a set time to acknowledge the warning and start braking their train accordingly. If the driver did not acknowledge the warning, the brakes would be applied automatically. Where this was implemented, it did away with the need for fog signalling, since the driver could tell the state of the distant signal regardless of their ability to see it.

The current system of AWS in use on Britain's railways is similar in principle to the Great Western's ATC but does not rely on physical contact between the track equipment and the train; instead an inductive system using a combination of permanent and electromagnets is used.

On passenger lines, AWS is now often supplemented by the Train Protection & Warning System (TPWS). TPWS functions in two ways, Train Stop System (TSS) will automatically apply the train's brakes in the event of a fitted signal being passed at danger without authority and Over-speed Sensor System (OSS) will automatically apply the train's brakes in the event of a fitted train exceeding a set speed on approach to a fitted signal.

On parts of the Great Western Mainline and the Chilterns line the trial systems of Automatic Train Protection (ATP) are still in use. These trials were ultimately discontinued in favour of TPWS, however, the original equipment is still maintained.

== See also ==
- Pass of Brander stone signals
- Rule 55
- Radio Electronic Token Block
