= Seer Green rail crash =

1981 rail crash in England

Details
- Date: 11 December 1981; 08:14
- Location: Near Seer Green, Buckinghamshire
- Coordinates: 51.6045°N 0.5973°W
- Country: England
- Line: Chiltern Main Line
- Operator: London Midland Region
- Cause: Signaller incorrectly authorised driver to pass signal at danger

Statistics
- Trains: 2
- Passengers: ~150
- Deaths: 4
- Injured: 5

The Seer Green rail crash occurred on the morning of 11 December 1981 near Seer Green, Buckinghamshire, England between two four-car Class 115 diesel multiple units, killing one driver and three passengers.

== Events ==
In the winter of 1981, the weather in Southern England turned cold and there were frequent heavy falls of snow. On the Chiltern Main Line, the snow caused tree branches in the cutting at Seer Green to be weighed down and some of them were brushed by passing trains.

On 11 December, the driver of an empty train from Marylebone to Princes Risborough came across a fallen branch lying across the track. He telephoned the signalman at High Wycombe to tell him that he was going to clear the obstruction and would be delayed by a few minutes.

Meanwhile, at Gerrards Cross, behind the stationary train, the driver of the 07:31 from Marylebone to Banbury was being cautioned by the signalman about the overhanging branches. The signalman then attempted to clear the starting signal for the train to proceed but the lever was locked. Unaware that the empty train had stopped, he looked at his signal box diagram and thought that the indications showed that the empty train was running towards Beaconsfield.

Assuming that the signal lever had frozen (when in fact it was electrically locked by the stationary train), he authorised the driver to pass the signal at danger, and the train set off into the still-falling snow. Glancing again at his diagram, he saw that the lights towards Beaconsfield were not in fact lit, and realised that the empty train was still in the section near Seer Green. He quickly went to the window and tried to attract the driver's attention by shouting, but nobody heard him.

The driver of the Banbury train drove too fast for the conditions and ran into the back of the empty train at about 30 mph. The front coach of the Banbury train partly telescoped underneath the rear coach of the empty train, and the driver and three passengers were killed. Five others were also injured.

== Investigation ==
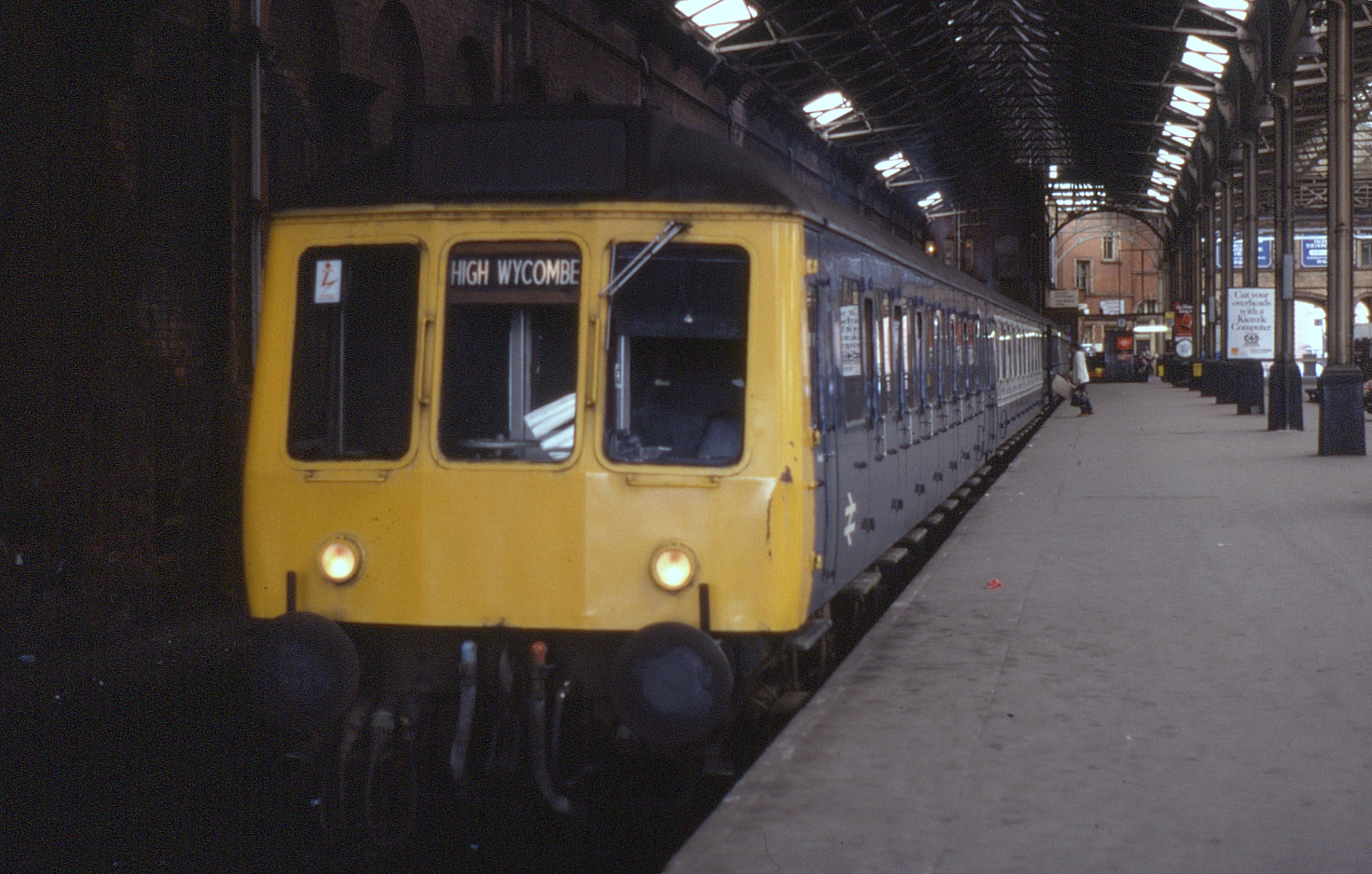
Class 115 unit at Marylebone

At the public inquiry, Inspecting Officer Major C.F. Rose held the signalman at Gerrards Cross chiefly to blame, although he did note that the signalman had only been qualified for a month and had been appointed through a jobcentre because nobody could be recruited internally. In addition to his inexperience, the signalling between Gerrards Cross and High Wycombe was unusually complex, with several track circuit block sections and intermediate block sections. The signal box diagram was subsequently altered to make its indications less ambiguous.

The driver of the Banbury train also shared some responsibility, because he drove too fast to be able to stop short of the stationary train.

Although British Rail's rules stated that the guard of the empty train should have applied detonator protection, this would have been unreasonable given that the obstruction would have been cleared in a few minutes.
