= Signal passed at danger =

Train passing stop signal without authority

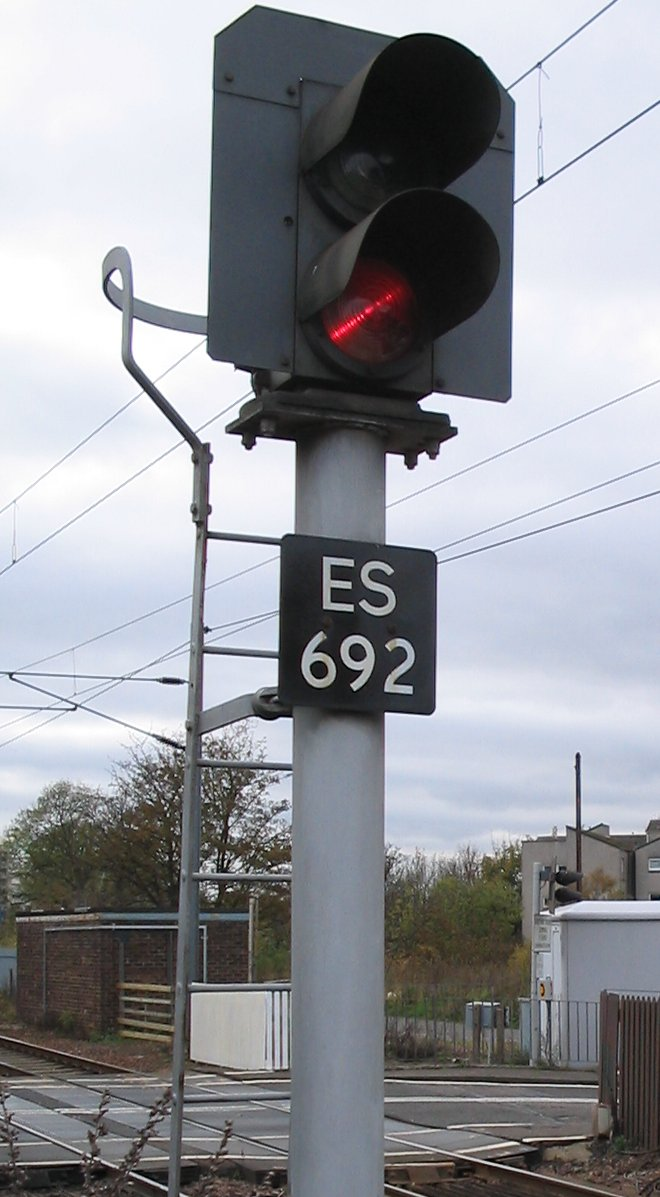
Two-aspect signal at danger (stop) in the United Kingdom

A signal passed at danger (SPAD) is an event on a railway where a train passes a stop signal without authority. This is also known as running a red, in the United States as a stop signal overrun (SSO) and in Canada as passing a stop signal. SPAD is defined by Directive 2014/88/EU as any occasion when any part of a train proceeds beyond its authorised movement. Unauthorised movement means to pass either:

- a trackside colour light signal or semaphore at danger, or an order to stop where a train protection system (TPS) is not operational
- the end of a safety-related movement authority provided in a TPS
- a point communicated by verbal or written authorisation laid down in regulations
- stop boards (buffer stops are not included) or hand signals

== Etymology ==
The name derives from red colour light signals and horizontal semaphore signals in the United Kingdom, which are said to be at danger when they indicate that trains must stop (also known as the signal being on). This terminology is not used in North America where not all red signals indicate stop. In the UK, a signal passed at red (SPAR) is used where a signal changes to red directly in front of a train, due to a fault or emergency, meaning it is impossible to stop before the signal.

== Causes ==
The high inertia of trains, and the low adhesion between the wheels and track, means it takes a long distance for the train brakes to stop a train. SPADs are most commonly a small overrun of the signal (instead of a long overrun), because the driver has braked too late. The safety consequences for these types of SPADs may be minor. On the other hand, some SPADs involve the driver being unaware they have passed a signal at danger and continue until notified by network controllers, or a collision occurs, as in the Ladbroke Grove rail crash.

The causes and prevention of SPADs is actively researched. Common causes of SPADs include:

- Misjudgement
- Environmental conditions
- Inattention
- Distraction
- Fatigue
- Misreading of an adjacent signal due to line curvature (a "crossread"), or sighting on one beyond
- Misunderstanding
- Miscommunication
- Incomplete or lapsed route knowledge
- Acute medical condition (medical emergency), such as a heart attack or stroke
- Chronic medical condition, such as sleep apnea causing microsleep
- Driver deviation from standard operating procedures
- False assumptions based on familiarity and past situations
- Poor change management practices
- Failure to properly assess competencies

== Prevention ==
=== Automatic train protection ===
Automatic train protection (ATP) is a system that can limit train speed in situations other than at a signal set at danger. ATP can supervise speed restrictions and distance to danger points. It can also take into account individual train characteristics such as brake performance etc. Therefore ATP can determine when brakes should be applied in order to stop the train before passing a signal at danger. Presently, In the UK, only a small percentage of trains (Great Western Railway and Chiltern Railways) are fitted with this equipment.

=== Driver's reminder appliance ===
The driver's reminder appliance (DRA) is an inhibiting switch located on the driver's desk of United Kingdom passenger trains designed specifically to prevent "starting away SPADs". The driver is required to operate the DRA whenever the train is brought to a stand, either after passing a signal displaying caution or at a signal displaying danger.

Once applied, the DRA displays a red light and prevents traction power from being taken until the DRA is manually cancelled by the driver.

== Collision prevention systems ==
Whilst the ideal safety system would prevent a SPAD from occurring, most equipment in current use does not stop the train before it has passed the danger signal. However, provided that the train stops within the designated overlap beyond that signal, a collision should not occur.

=== Train stops ===
On the London Underground (for example), mechanical train stops are fitted beside the track at signals to stop a train, should a SPAD occur.

Train stops are also installed on main line railways in places where tripcock equipped trains run in extensive tunnels, such as on the Northern City Line where the Automatic Warning System and Train Protection & Warning System are not fitted.

=== Automatic Warning System ===
On the UK mainline, AWS consists of an on-board receiver/timer connected to the emergency braking system of a train, and magnets located in the center of the track. At each AWS site, a permanent magnet arms the system and an electromagnet connected to the green signal lamp disarms the system and a confirming chime is provided to the driver. If the receiver does not disarm within one second after arming, a warning tone sounds at the driver's desk and if it is not cancelled by the driver, the emergency brakes will be activated. A visual indication remains set to remind the driver that they have passed a restrictive signal aspect.

=== Train Protection & Warning System ===
On the UK mainline, TPWS consists of an on-board receiver/timer connected to the emergency braking system of a train, and radio frequency transmitter loops located on the track. The 'Overspeed Sensor System' pair of loops is located on the approach to the signal, and will activate the train's emergency brake if it approaches faster than the 'trigger speed' when the signal is at danger. The 'Train Stop System' pair of loops is located at the signal, and will activate the emergency brake if the train passes over them at any speed when the signal is at danger.

The deployment of TPWS is not universal; only those signals where the risk of collision is considered to be significant are fitted with it.

=== Flank protection ===
At certain junctions, especially where if the signal protecting the junction was passed at danger a side collision is likely to result, then flank protection may be used. Derailers and/or facing points beyond the signal protecting the junction will be set in such a position to allow a safe overlap if the signal was passed without authority. This effectively removes the chance of a side-impact collision as the train would be diverted in a parallel path to the approaching train.

=== SPAD indicators ===
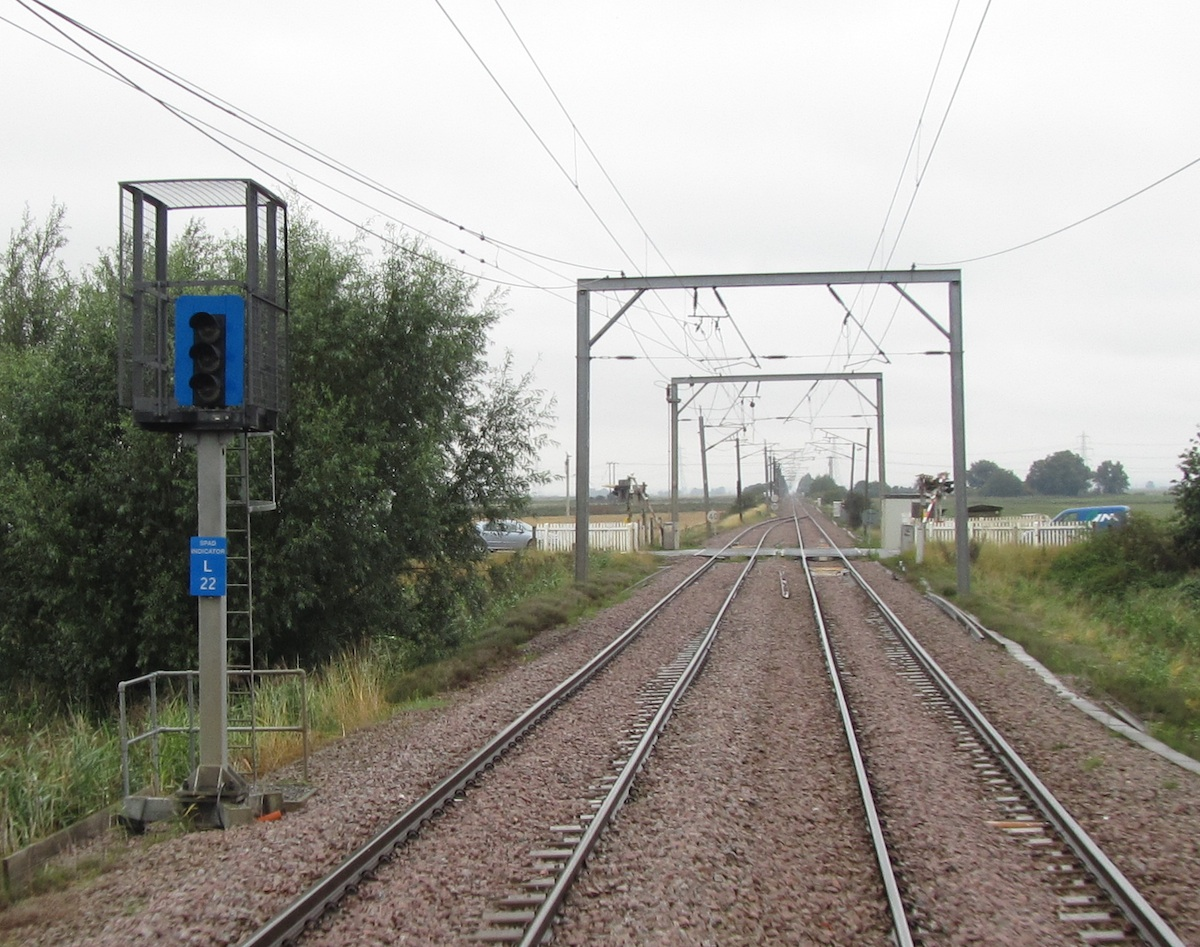
SPAD indicator

Animation demonstrating a SPAD indicator in action.

Prior to the introduction of TPWS in the UK, "SPAD indicators" were introduced at high risk locations (for example: the entry to a single track section of line). Consisting of three red lamps, they are placed beyond the protecting stop signal and are normally unlit. If a driver passes the signal at 'danger', the top and bottom lamps flash red and the centre lamp, which has the word "STOP" written across the lens in black, is lit continuously. Whenever a SPAD indicator activates, all drivers who observe it are required to stop immediately, even if they can see that the signal pertaining to their own train is showing a proceed aspect.

== UK acronyms: SPAD / SPAR ==
In the UK, incidents where a signal is passed at danger without authority are categorised according to principal cause. A SPAD is where the train proceeds beyond its authorised movement to an unauthorised movement. Other types are categorised as SPAR ("signal passed at red").

Prior to December 2012, the term "SPAD" applied to all such incidents, with a letter specifying cause.

- A SPAD (formerly Category A SPAD) is where the train proceeds beyond its authorised movement to an unauthorised movement.
- A Technical SPAR (formerly Category B SPAD) is where the signal reverted to danger in front of the train due to an equipment failure or signaller error and the train was unable to stop before passing the signal.
- A Signaller SPAR (formerly Category C SPAD) is where the signal was replaced to danger in front of the train by the signaller in accordance with the rules and regulations and the train was unable to stop before passing the signal.
- A Runaway SPAR (formerly Category D SPAD) is where an unattended train or vehicles not attached to a traction unit run away past a signal at danger. Note that where this was the fault of the driver, this will be classed as a SPAD.

Some SPADs are defined as:

- SAS SPAD – "Starting against signal" SPAD, where the train was standing at a danger signal and the driver moved past it.
- SOY SPAD – "Starting on yellow" SPAD, where the train started on a caution signal and the driver did not appreciate that the next signal would be at danger.

== Passing signals at danger – with authority ==
Signals form part of a complex system, and it is inevitable that faults may occur. They are designed to fail safe, so that when problems occur, the affected signal indicates danger (an example where this did not happen, known as a wrong-side failure, was the Clapham Junction rail crash due primarily to faulty wiring). To keep the network running, safety rules enable trains to pass signals that cannot be cleared to a proceed aspect. Provided that authority for the movement is obtained, a SPAD does not occur. There are two methods of obtaining that authority:

=== Driver obtains signaller's authority to pass a signal at danger ===
Once the train has been brought to a stand at a signal which is at danger, the driver should attempt to contact the signaller. If the signal cannot be cleared then the driver must obtain the signaller's authority to pass it at danger. Methods for contacting the signaller may include GSM-R cab radio, signal post telephone or mobile phone.

In the UK, the signaller can authorise a driver to pass a signal at danger when:

- The signal is defective or disconnected
- The signal cannot be cleared because signalling or level crossing equipment has failed
- The signal is to be passed at danger for shunting purposes
- The signal cannot be cleared because a train or movement which has reversed is then required to start from beyond that signal
- An electric train is to pass the signal protecting an isolated section and proceed towards the limiting point
- A train has been accepted using restricted acceptance because the line is clear only up to the home signal of the next signal box and the section signal cannot be cleared
- In an emergency, and then only when authorised by the signal box supervisor or Operations Control, so that a train carrying passengers can enter an occupied section to use a station platform
- An engineering train is to move towards a possession, or leave a line under possession at an intermediate point
- A train is to pass the signal protecting engineering work to gain access to a station where the train is required to start back, or a line under single line working, or a siding
- The line is to be examined to check that it is clear
- A train is to proceed at caution through an absolute block section from the signal box in rear when a failed train has been removed
- A train is to enter the section after a train or vehicle that has proceeded without authority has been removed, or the front portion of a divided train has passed through the section
- A train is to enter the section to assist a failed train, evacuate passengers from a failed train, remove a portion of a divided train, or remove a train or vehicles that have proceeded without authority
- Single line working applies
- Working by pilotman or modified working applies

The driver and signaller must come to a clear understanding, and ensure they agree about how it is to be done. In the UK the signaller tells the driver of a specific train to pass a specific signal at danger, proceed with caution and travel at a speed that enables him to stop short of any obstruction, and then obey all other signals. If the signal is fitted with TPWS, the driver resets the Driver Reminder Appliance, pushes the TPWS Trainstop Override button in the cab, and proceeds cautiously through the section. If the train reaches the next signal without finding an obstruction, they must obey its aspect, at which point they can revert to normal working.

=== Driver passes a signal at danger under their own authority ===
If contact with the signaller cannot be made then the driver must not move the train, unless it is standing at one of the following signals:

- A signal controlled from a signal box that is closed on absolute block line only.
- An automatic signal where local instructions permit it, e.g. signals within tunnels on the Northern City Line.

After passing a signal at danger under their own authority, the driver must stop at the next signal (even if it is showing a proceed aspect) and inform the signaller of what they have done.

== EU statistics of SPADs as precursors of accidents ==
ERADIS database on SPADs as precursors of accidents per million kilometers
Area	2006	2007	2008	2009	2010	2011	2012	2013	2014	2015	2016	2017	2018	2019	2020	2021	2022
Austria	0.099	0.077	0.101	0.131	0.070	0.033	0.067	0.080	0.072	0.255	0.378	0.398	0.553	0.768	0.630	0.848	0.834
Belgium		0.782	1.044	0.816	1.061	0.905	0.756	0.577	0.683	0.952	0.937	0.550	0.739	0.744	0.576	0.752	0.877
Bulgaria	0.139	0.416	0.342	0.095	0.000	0.128	0.144	0.568	0.556	0.431	0.680	0.752	0.605	0.958	0.924	0.701	0.734
Switzerland				0.182	0.561	0.610	0.689	0.599	0.613	0.492	0.457	0.543	0.593	0.574	0.540	0.576	0.712
Channel Tunnel		0.765	0.542	0.708	0.525	1.071	1.042	0.168	0.713	0.374	0.241	0.610	0.606	0.253	0.769	1.302	0.694
Czechia	0.377	0.170	0.149	0.239	0.487	0.529	0.496	0.485	0.525	0.562	0.716	0.763	0.815	0.840	0.886	1.001	0.988
Germany		0.693	0.728	0.354	0.341	0.441	0.385	0.361	0.451	0.463	0.490	0.506	0.566	0.519	0.510	0.577	0.564
Denmark	9.387	1.283	1.378	3.311	2.859	2.664	2.198	2.231	1.833	1.943	1.943	2.292	2.257	2.708	2.390	3.008	3.562
Estonia		0.265	0.280	0.147	0.000	0.143	0.284	0.000	0.534	0.710	0.597	0.768	0.694	0.818	0.606	0.822	0.147
Greece	0.052	0.050	0.047	0.255	0.059	0.239	0.086	0.000		11.259	0.000			0.000	0.000	0.000	0.000
Spain	0.502	0.501	0.576	0.500	0.466	0.408	0.408	0.408	0.406	0.423	0.468	0.577	0.460	0.519	0.498	0.421	0.574
Finland	0.354	0.418	0.563	0.400	0.686	0.392	0.393	0.654	0.604	1.030	1.325	1.268	0.813	0.951	0.534	0.699	0.328
France	0.069	0.212	0.229	0.264	0.231	0.255	0.238	0.293	0.302	0.241	0.304	0.319	0.413	0.537	0.599	0.584	0.466
Croatia								0.000	0.000	0.096	0.048	0.000	0.082	0.092	0.099	0.143	0.095
Hungary	0.075	0.105	0.073	0.066	0.098	0.164	0.202	0.173	0.168	0.101	0.037	0.157	0.083	0.130	0.799	0.204	0.611
Ireland	1.919	1.842	1.104	1.155	0.791	0.332	0.435	0.985	0.547	0.827	0.712	0.480	0.713	0.628	0.643	0.449	0.659
Italy	0.064	0.041	0.055	0.043	0.031	0.038	0.063	0.051	0.064	0.056	0.070	0.085	0.065	0.103	0.098	0.107	0.080
Lithuania	8.968	4.002	0.190	0.498	0.142	0.000	0.273	0.212	0.070	0.212	0.000	0.195	0.065	0.296	0.000	0.203	0.168
Luxembourg				0.124	0.490	1.241	0.571	0.444	0.666	1.633	0.345	1.233	0.805	0.927	0.641	0.856	0.628
Latvia	0.234	0.108	0.256	0.214	0.361	0.108	0.159	0.228	0.158	0.323	0.061	0.192	0.118	0.196	0.259	0.270	0.357
Netherlands	2.195	1.964	1.727	1.621	1.156	1.040	0.007	0.000	0.720	0.642	0.635	0.661	0.842	0.863	0.626	0.657	0.673
Norway	1.646	1.540	1.494	2.426	2.497	1.265	1.091	1.360	1.377	1.179	1.251	1.260	1.367	1.319	1.127	0.937	1.246
Poland		17.993	11.825	0.062	0.059	0.128	0.147	0.157	0.300	0.276	0.320	0.386	0.431	0.410	0.381	0.591	0.552
Portugal	0.611	0.488	0.575	0.296	0.150	0.591	0.667	0.717	0.821	0.444	0.862	0.471	0.522	0.219	0.757	0.783	0.646
Romania	4.478	4.415	4.119	4.881	6.106	4.971	4.122	4.339	3.183	5.344	4.576	3.430	3.752	3.948	0.000	0.000	0.000
Sweden	1.466	1.615	1.990	2.530	2.413	2.116	2.336	2.046	1.678	0.943	1.526	1.746	2.055	1.690	1.441	1.603	1.490
Slovenia	0.790	0.835	0.746	0.659	0.531	0.246	0.302	0.000	0.390	0.325	0.141	0.409	0.000	0.099	0.296	0.000	0.094
Slovakia	1.530	1.549	1.520	1.668	0.463	0.551	0.843	0.706	0.383	0.457	0.492	0.581	0.568	0.394	0.692	0.648	0.492
United Kingdom	0.657	0.622	0.576	0.457	0.585	0.509	0.411	0.498	0.551	0.493	0.419	0.514	0.559	0.573	0.517		

== Accidents involving a signal passed at danger without authority ==
Country	Incident	Year
United States	Norwalk rail accident	1853
United Kingdom	Lewisham rail crash	1857
Canada	St-Hilaire train disaster	1864
United Kingdom	Hexthorpe rail accident	1887
Denmark	Gentofte train crash	1897
United Kingdom	Potters Bar rail accidents	1898
United Kingdom	Slough rail accident	1900
United States	Washington DC train wreck	1906
Australia	Sunshine rail disaster	1908
United Kingdom	Tonbridge accident	1909
United Kingdom	Ais Gill disaster	1913
United Kingdom	Ilford rail crash	1915
Hungary	Herceghalom rail crash	1916
United Kingdom	Charfield railway disaster	1928
Germany	Genthin rail disaster	1939
United Kingdom	Norton Fitzwarren rail crash	1940
United Kingdom	Eccles rail crash	1941
United States	Lackawanna Limited wreck	1943
United Kingdom	Potters Bar rail accidents	1946
United Kingdom	Harrow and Wealdstone rail crash	1952
United Kingdom	Luton rail crash	1955
United Kingdom	Lewisham rail crash	1957
United Kingdom	Dagenham East rail crash	1958
United States	Newark Bay rail accident	1958
United Kingdom	Coppenhall Junction railway accident	1962
Netherlands	Harmelen train disaster	1962
United Kingdom	Marden rail crash	1969
Australia	Violet Town railway disaster	1969
United Kingdom	Paisley Gilmour Street rail accident	1979
United Kingdom	Invergowrie rail accident	1979
United States	Philadelphia Conrail West Chester Branch collision	1979
Poland	Otłoczyn railway accident	1980
United Kingdom	Wembley Central rail crash	1984
United Kingdom	Eccles rail crash	1984
Canada	Hinton train collision	1986
United Kingdom	Colwich rail crash	1986
United States	Chase train collision	1987
United Kingdom	Glasgow Bellgrove rail crash	1989
United Kingdom	Purley station rail crash	1989
Germany	Rüsselsheim train disaster	1990
Japan	Shigaraki train disaster	1991
United Kingdom	Newton rail accident	1991
United Kingdom	Cowden rail crash	1994
Canada	Toronto subway accident	1995
Germany	Garmisch-Partenkirchen train collision	1995
United States	Secaucus Train Collision	1996
United States	Silver Spring train collision	1996
Australia	Hines Hill train collision	1996
United Kingdom	Southall rail crash	1997
Australia	Beresfield rail disaster	1997
Finland	Suonenjoki rail collision	1998
United Kingdom	Spa Road Junction rail crash	1999
United Kingdom	Winsford railway accident	1999
United Kingdom	Ladbroke Grove rail crash	1999
Norway	Åsta accident	2000
Belgium	Pécrot	2001
United Kingdom	Norton Bridge rail crash	2003
Egypt	Qalyoub rail accident	2006
Netherlands	Arnhem	2006
United States	Chatsworth train collision	2008
Belgium	Halle train collision	2010
India	Badarwas train collision	2010
Indonesia	Petarukan train collision	2010
Germany	Saxony-Anhalt train accident	2011
Netherlands	Sloterdijk train collision	2012
United States	Goodwell, Oklahoma	2012
Switzerland	Granges-près-Marnand	2013
Romania	Cotești	2014
Belgium	Hermalle-sous-Huy train collision	2016
Portugal	Soure train crash	2020
United Kingdom	Salisbury rail crash	2021
United Kingdom	Bedford train collision	2026

== Accidents following a signal passed at danger with authority ==
Whenever a signal is passed at danger the driver is required to "proceed with caution, stop short of any obstructions, and drive at speed that will enable you to stop within the distance which you can see to be clear". Failure to do this has caused the following collisions:

- Australia – Roseville, 1950
- United Kingdom – Stratford (London Underground), 1953
- United Kingdom – Coppenhall Junction, 1962
- United Kingdom – Wrawby Junction, 1983
- Australia – Glenbrook, 1999
- Italy – Vittorio Emanuele (Rome Metro), 2006

== Accidents where the signaller incorrectly authorised a driver to pass a signal at danger ==
Except where permissive working is in use, interlocking usually prevents a train from being signalled into a section that is already occupied. When operational needs require it, this can be overridden, and provided it is carried out in accordance with the rules this is a safe practice. However, failure to follow protocol can result in a collision:

- United States – Nashville, Tennessee, 1918
- Romania – Bucerdea, 1968
- United Kingdom – Castlecary rail accidents, 1968
- United Kingdom – Seer Green, 1981
- Indonesia – Jakarta, 1987
- Luxembourg / France – Zoufftgen, 2006
- Poland – Szczekociny, 2012
- Germany – Bad Aibling, 2016
- Greece – Thessaly, 2023

== See also ==
- Ding-ding, and away, British slang for a guard incorrectly giving permission to a driver to start away from a platform against a red signal.
