= 2010 Badarwas train collision =

Railway incident in Madhya Pradesh, India

Details
- Date: 20 September 2010; 5 a.m. local time
- Location: Badarwas
- Coordinates: 24°58′12″N 77°34′12″E
- Country: India
- Incident type: Collision
- Cause: Red signal overshot

Statistics
- Trains: 2
- Deaths: 23
- Injured: 30

The 2010 Badarwas train collision occurred on 20 September 2010, at Badarwas, Madhya Pradesh, India, when two trains collided with each other. Twenty-three people were reported dead as a result of the accident, and 30 people were reported injured.

== Accident ==
The accident happened at around 5 A.M. when a freight train rammed the stationary Indore-Gwalior Intercity Express from behind at Badarwas railway station, resulting in the piling up of the last three compartments of the Intercity express on top of one another.
