= Route knowledge =

Geographic information, in the context of learning to drive trains

Route knowledge is one of the core skills together with train handling (also known as brake handling) and a full understanding of railway rules, which the operating crew must possess in order to be able to operate a train safely.

== Content ==
The information that must be learnt and understood includes the following:

=== Route characteristics ===
- Route features: stations, depots, yards, sidings, junctions, points, crossings, signal boxes, bridges, tunnels, names of running lines, direction of travel of running lines, gradients in relation to the types of train to be driven and termination/limiting points of movements.
- Signal types: the signalling system(s) in use, including the position, sighting and function of signals and associated route indicators.
- Train protection systems: commencement and termination points of the infrastructure elements of systems.
- Train radio systems: commencement and termination points of the infrastructure elements of train radio systems. Where relevant to the operation, this should include the location of channel change locations.
- Lineside signage: location and meaning of all lineside signs applicable to the safe operation of trains, for example fire zones, power shut-off boards, etc.
- Permitted speed: permitted train and line speed restrictions for all normal and degraded conditions.
- Level crossings: the location of level crossings, including open crossings and those equipped with automatic half-barriers and miniature red/green lights. Relevant speed restrictions for level crossings, including any special working arrangements for degraded situations.
- Braking points and stopping distances: braking points and stopping distances in relation to characteristics of the route and the types of train to be driven.
- Stations: train stopping points, platform lengths, methods of train despatch and operating restrictions.
- Power supplies: as applicable, knowledge of neutral sections/section gaps, wired/unwired sections of route, track paralleling huts, isolation procedures.
- Communication: systems in operation and relevant contact numbers for signallers/dispatchers, Zone Controls, and Emergency Control Centres etc.
- Operating restrictions: for example, use of signal post telephones, restrictions on route availability.
- Local working instructions for locations where non-standard procedures are in place.
- Authorised walking routes: knowledge applicable to all locations where crew must walk close to train movements.

=== Where there is a risk that a signal may be "passed at danger" ===
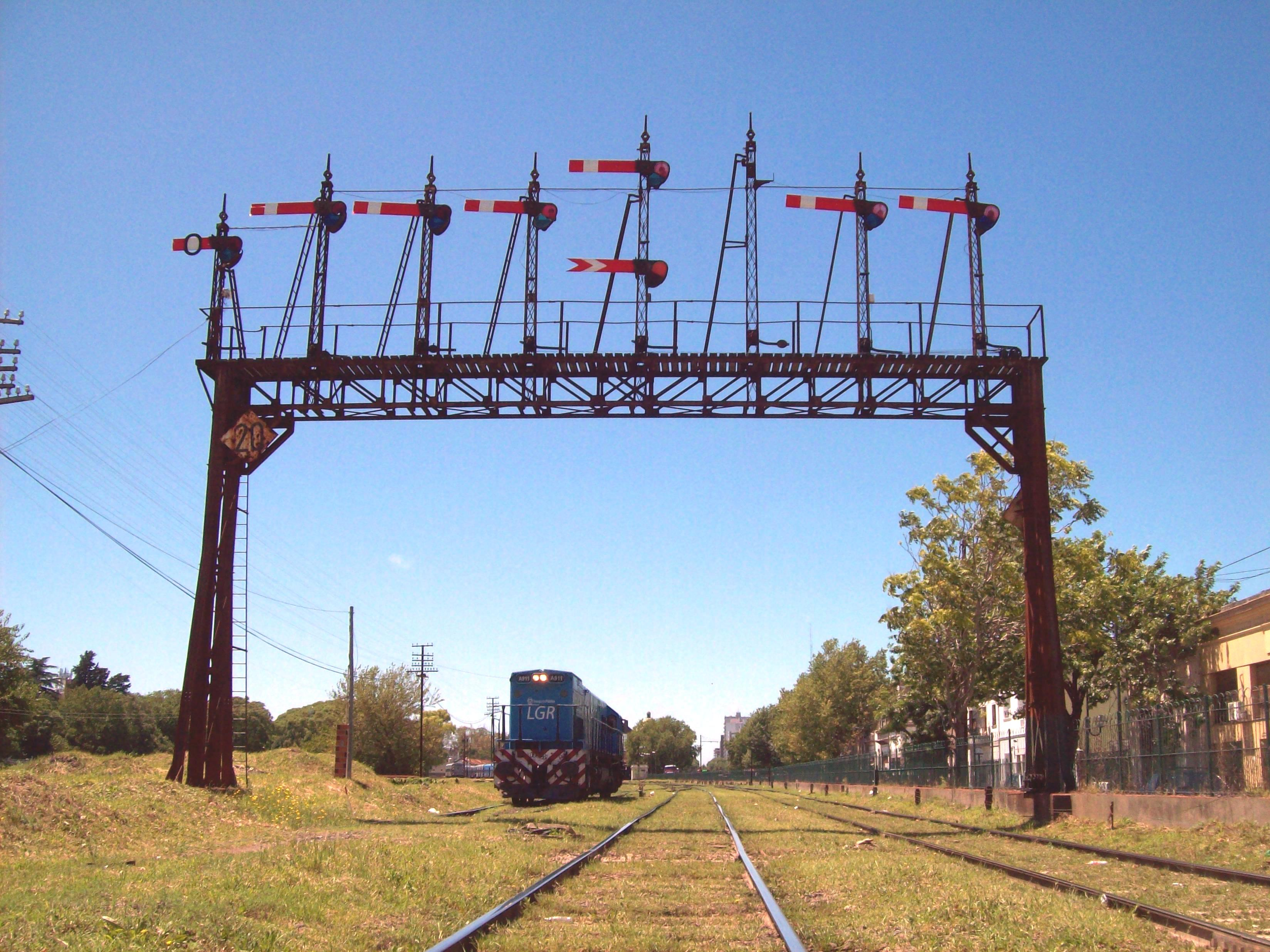
Where more than one signal is located on a gantry there is a risk of reading across to an adjacent signal.

- Signals which have been passed at danger on several occasions, with a particular focus on those where the potential consequences are significant.
- Signal gantries where there is history of a signal passed at danger or there is a potential to misread signals (reading across).
- Signals that can be viewed in advance of the next signal (reading through), this is a particular risk with modern ultra-bright LED signals.
- Signals that are known to sometimes be affected by bright sunlight (both main and shunting signals).
- Signals which are positioned on the opposite side of the running line in the direction of travel (both main and shunting signals).
- Locations where there are inconsistent braking distances between signals.
- Locations where the signalling changes between 4 aspect, 3 aspect and 2 aspect color light.
- Locations or routes where there is a mixture of color light and mechanical signalling.
- Commencement and termination points of bi-directional working.
- Locations where the signal is not in view where there is a potential for starting against the signal at danger (SAS SPAD or SASPAD in the UK).
- Locations where the normal stopping point is adjacent to the signal and there is a potential for starting against the signal at danger.
- Locations where starting on a caution signal has led to a driver/engineer inadvertently passing the next signal at danger (SOYSPAD in the UK).
- Potential distractions such as passing through an electrical neutral section on the approach to a signal.
- Locations or routes not fitted with Train protection systems, including termination, commencement points and gaps.

=== Other route risks ===
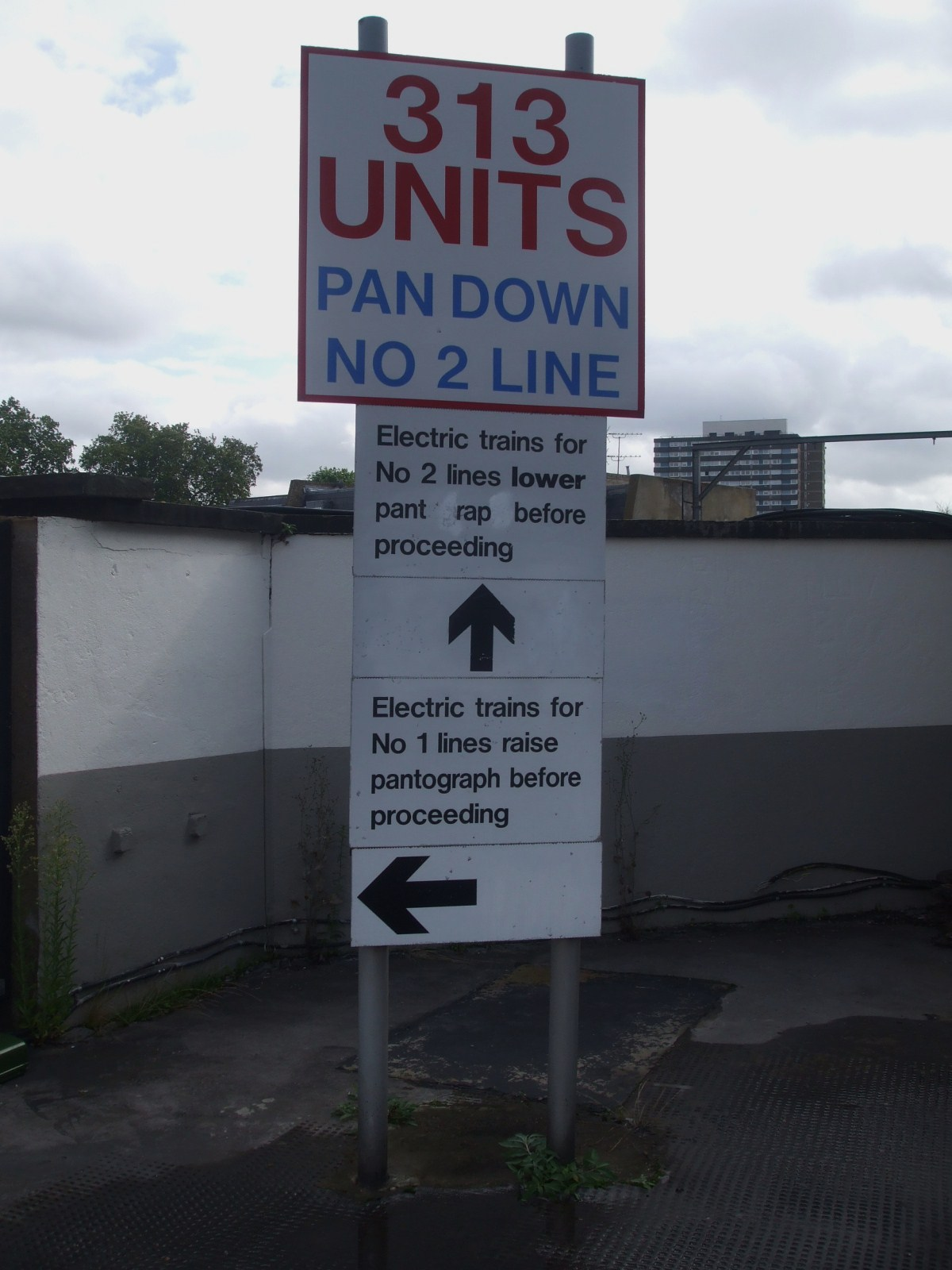
All lineside signs must be understood, as well as the action which must be taken when encountering them.

- Exceptional low adhesion areas, low adhesion areas and other locations which are affected by seasonal factors (e.g., leaves) or climatic factors (e.g., ice).
- Potential differences between driving over the route in daylight and in darkness.
- Platform, tunnel, or street lighting which may affect the identification of braking points.
- Potential lineside distractions such as depots, yards and non-railway activities (e.g., outdoor swimming pools).
- Bi-directional working, reversible working or multi-track lines that do not run parallel to each other.
- Locations where there is a significant reduction in line speed.
- Communication black spots.
- Complex signalling or track layout. For example, the approaches to major junctions and stations.

== Methods and assessment ==
Route learning can consist of:

- Studying route maps and diagrams, such as the Network Rail Sectional Appendix
- Travelling in the cab of a train with a driver
- Driving a train over the route with an instructor
- Watching route videos
