= Absolute block signalling =

British railway signalling scheme

Absolute block signalling is a British signalling block system designed to ensure the safe operation of a railway by allowing only one train to occupy a defined section of track (block) at a time. Each block section is manually controlled by a signalman, who communicates with the other block sections via telegraph. This system was used on double or multiple lines where use of each line is assigned a direction of travel before the introduction of track circuits.

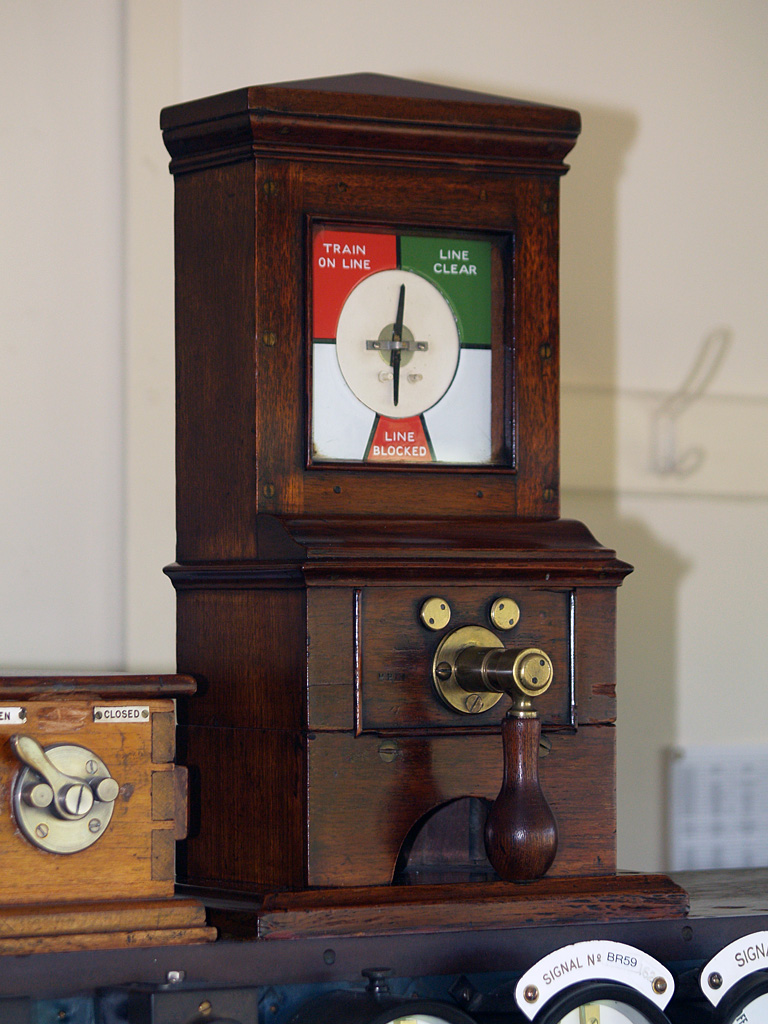
A block telegraph instrument set to its default position of "line blocked"

A train approaching a section is offered by a signalman to his counterpart at the next signal box. If the section is clear, the latter accepts the train, and the first signalman may clear his signals to give permission for the train to enter the section. This communication traditionally takes place by bell codes and status indications transmitted over a simple telegraph wire circuit between signalmen using a device called a block instrument, although some contemporary block working is operated wirelessly. This process is repeated for every block section a train passes through. The absolute block system does not replace the use of any other form of signalling, such as fixed signals, hand signals, or detonators – and, in fact, usually relies on fixed signals.

Prior to the introduction of block systems, time intervals were used to keep trains sufficiently far apart; typically if five minutes had passed since the first train had departed then a second train was allowed to proceed; although the driver was warned that there was a train only five minutes ahead. This was sometimes insufficient to prevent a train colliding with the rear of one that had stopped unexpectedly.

== Block section ==
In absolute block working, a block section (or simply section) is a section of railway line between one signal box and another. The signal box towards which a train travels is said to be in advance and the signal box from which it travels is said to be in rear. A block section is normally the section of track from the most advanced signal controlled by the signal box in rear, and the rearmost signal controlled by the signal box in advance. Because many signal boxes are at stations, the last signal controlled by the rear box is called the starter signal, whether or not there is a station at which trains stop. This signal, and the rearmost signal controlled by the box ahead, are stop signals, which a train should not pass if they are in the on position, showing a red light. The first stop signal controlled by a box is called the home signal. A distant signal is also provided some distance from the home signal, which will only show a clear aspect if all stop signals under a signal box's control are clear, and will otherwise show caution – this gives a driver advance warning of a need to stop.

=== Intermediate block section ===
Some signal boxes have an intermediate block section, or IBS. This normally takes the place of an old absolute block section, and is commonly found where former absolute block sections and their associated signal boxes have been removed. Essentially an intermediate block section allows two block sections, and therefore two trains, to be on the same line but controlled by the same signal box.

Typically, a signal box with an intermediate block section will have a home signal (and associated distant signal), starting signal and an intermediate block home signal which has its own distant signal. The line from the starting signal to the intermediate block home signal is called the intermediate block home section. The line from the intermediate block home signal to the home signal of the next signal box on the same line in the same direction of travel is the absolute block section. To clear the intermediate block home signal a "line clear" is required from the signal box in advance.

An intermediate block section means that a train can approach the intermediate block home signal while there is a train between the intermediate block home signal and the home signal of the next signal box on the same line in the same direction of travel. Generally, all intermediate block home signals and their respective distants are colour light signals, normally showing two aspects.

=== Station limits ===
The extent of the line from the rearmost home signal to the most advanced starting signal controlled from the same signal box is called station limits at that signal box (this does not necessarily refer to a passenger station). Within station limits, the signalman controls the safe movement, and in normal circumstances he can directly see the position of trains there. Usually no communication with other signalmen is needed for movements within station limits.

== Railway telegraphy ==
Electrical telegraphy was the first practical use of current electricity and was developed in the 1840s and 1850s at the same time as the development of railways. The first commercial electrical telegraph was the Cooke and Wheatstone system. In July 1837 William Fothergill Cooke installed a demonstration system on the Euston to Camden Town section of Robert Stephenson's London and Birmingham Railway for signalling rope-hauling of carriages (as the locomotives could not cope with the steep incline).

Cooke also put forward the idea of dividing a single line into grand divisions of between 15 and 20 miles (24 and 32 km), each subdivided into stages 2 to 5 miles (3.2 to 8.0 km) long that were to be connected together by telegraph, with instruments that showed the state of each stage. In 1842 he published these ideas in a book entitled Telegraphic Railways: Or the Single Way Recommended by Safety, Economy, and Efficiency, Under the Safeguard and Control of the Electric Telegraph. Cooke's ideas were not taken up by the railway companies until the 1850s and 1860s. When they were developed into a practical system, it provided the ability for signalmen to communicate with each other and provided the basis for the absolute block system. By 1872 it was used on 44% of lines in Britain, rising to 75% by the end of the decade and was made mandatory on passenger-carrying lines in 1889. It successfully managed train control over most of the British railway system until generally superseded by more sophisticated systems from 1950.

=== Block instruments ===
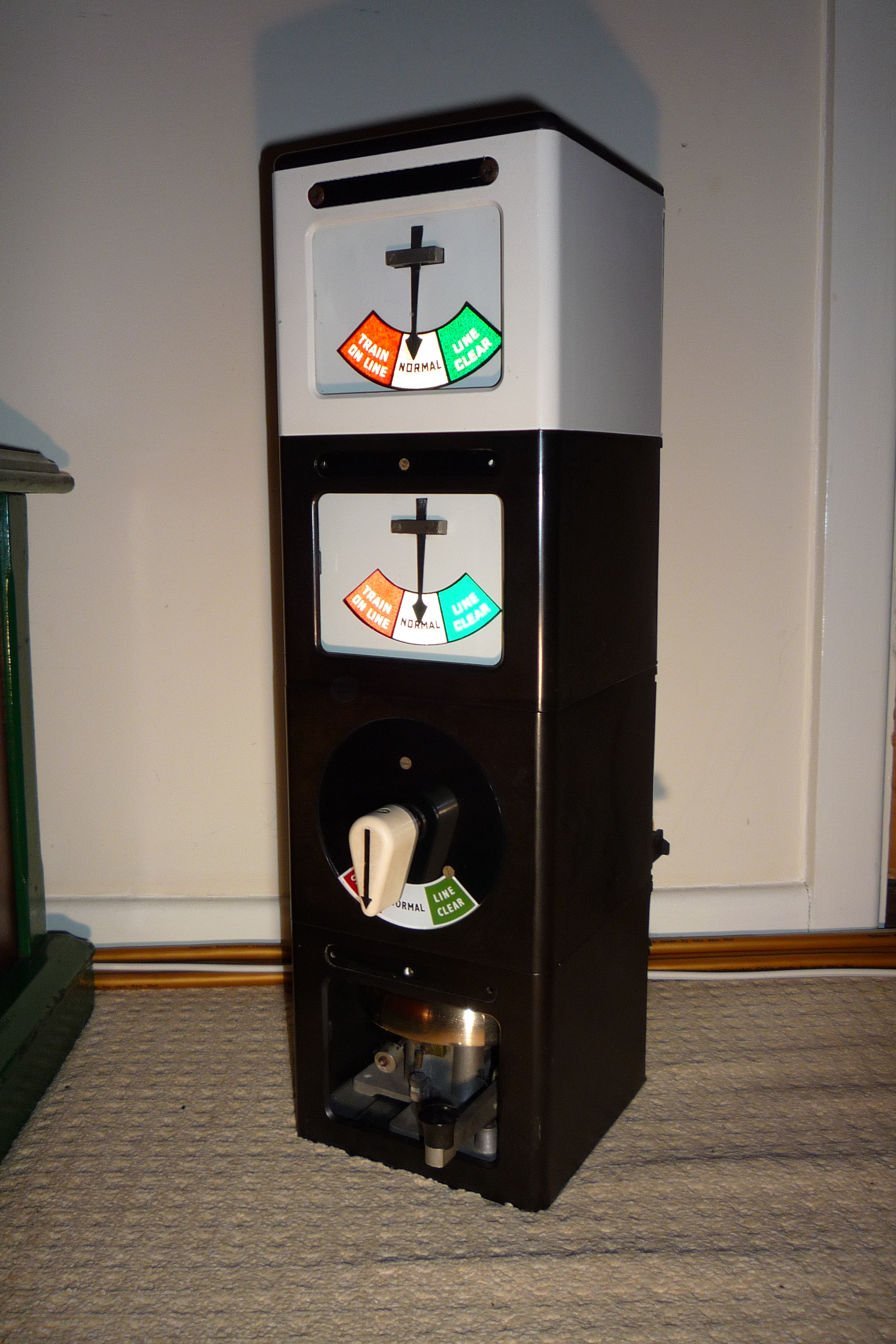
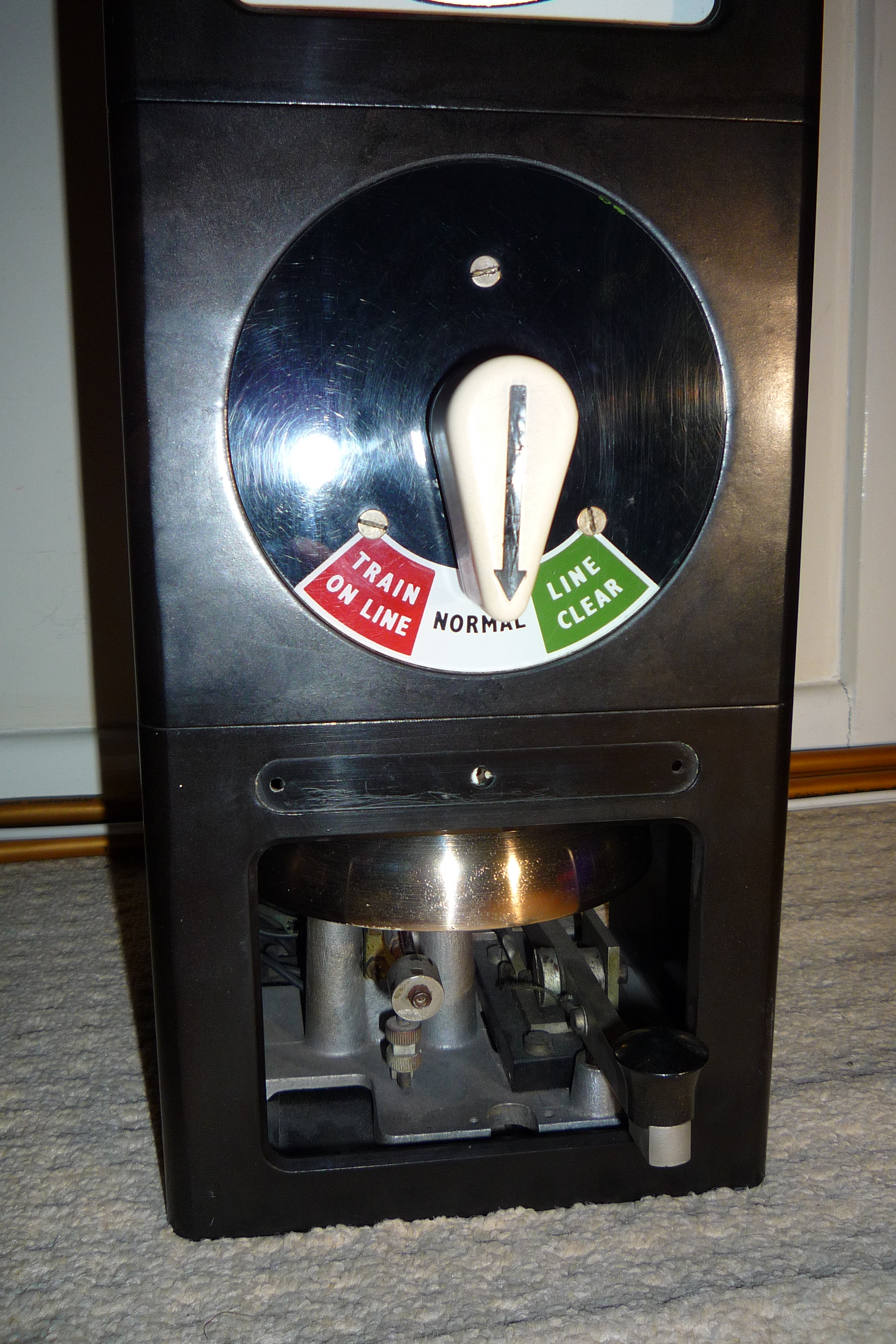
British Railways standard block instrument. At the bottom is the tapper, bell and the commutator switch that is used to set the status of the block (close-up on the right). Above that is the indicator of the block's status which is also seen in an adjacent signal box. At the top is a repeater display of the status of the adjacent block.

Block instruments are located in signal boxes. Originally the different displays and commutator handle were in a variety of cabinets. The standard British Railways block instrument brought them together in a single small cabinet; its front face displaying two indicators, a commutator handle, a bell and a tapper. The upper indicator shows the state of the forward block – along the line leading away from the signal box. The commutator is used by the signalman to indicate the state of his block, and the lower indicator displays this state, which is also displayed on a repeater indicator in the box for the block from which a train will come. At the bottom is a single-stroke bell and the tapper to sound the bell in the next box. The commutator and each of the two indicators has three positions: normal (or line blocked), line clear, and train on line. In the simplest case of a signal box serving a two-track section, there will be two block instruments, one for communicating with each of the neighbouring boxes.

=== Signalling bell ===
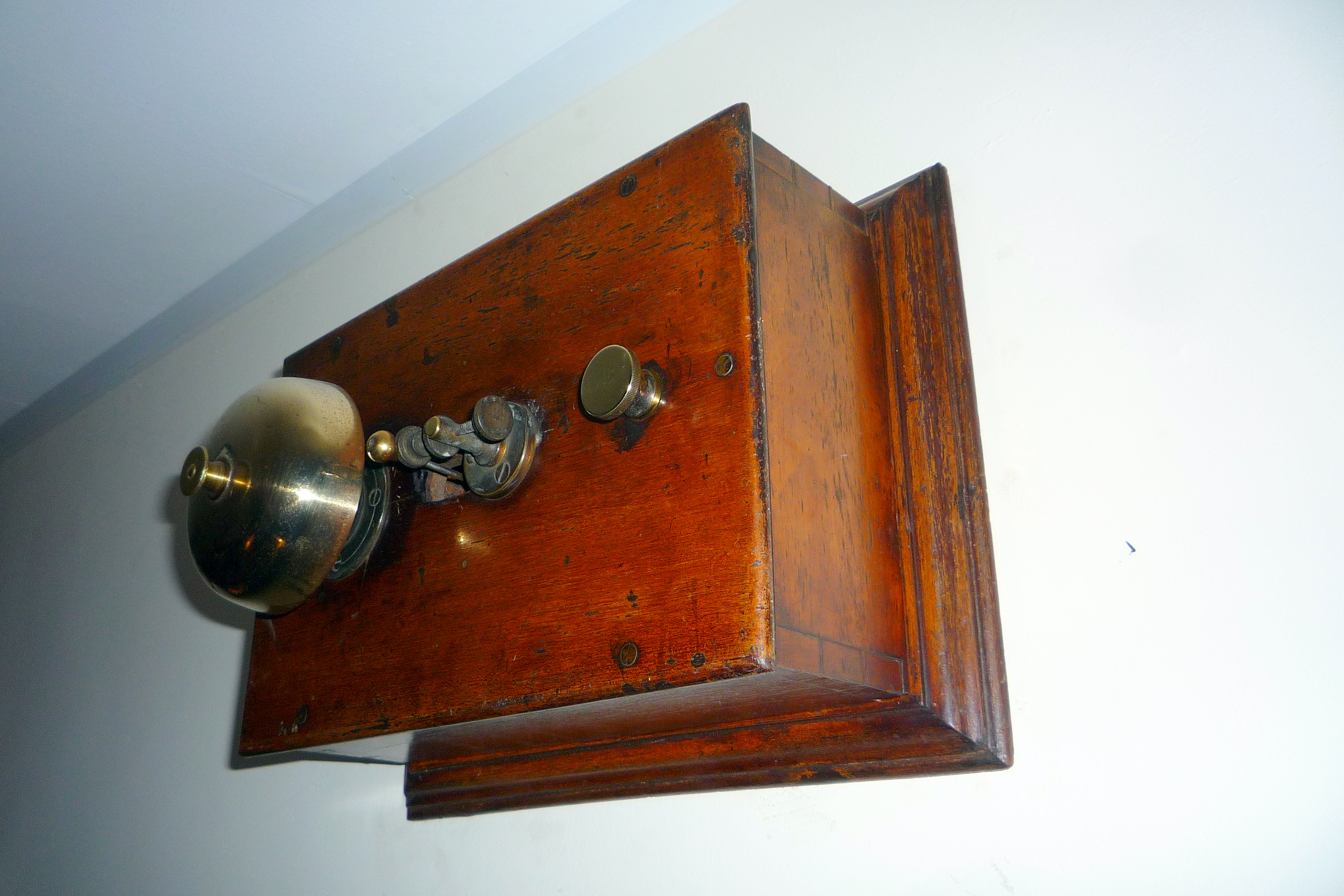
Tyer's single stroke signalling bell

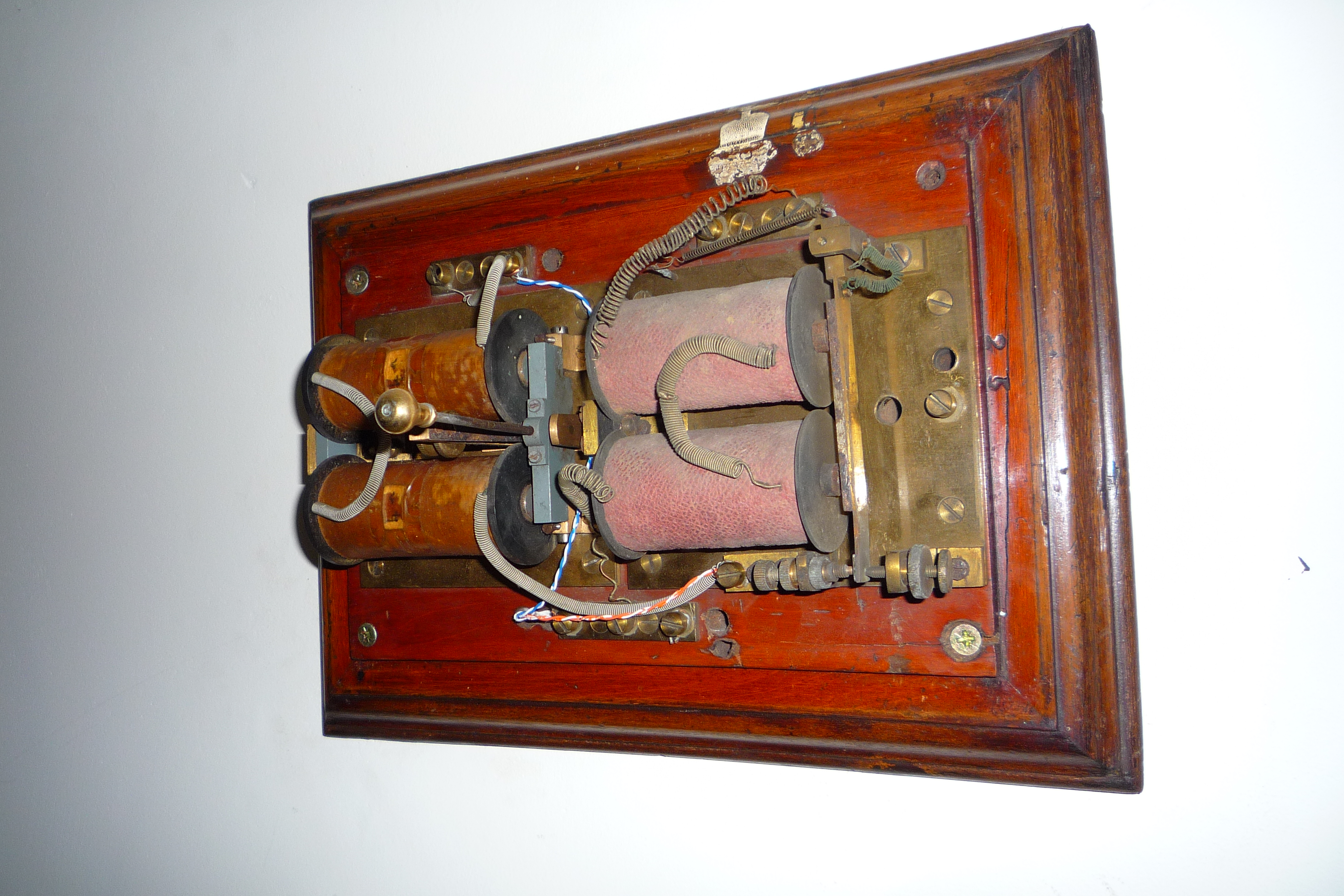
Internal view showing the coil, clapper and relay

The signalling bell, also known as a block bell, is used in conjunction with the block instruments if the bell is not integrated with them. Each bell has its own distinctive sound so that the signalman knows which box is communicating with him.

There are a set of standard bell codes. Each communication starts with a single strike of the bell meaning "Call attention". The recipient signalman then shows that he has received the message by repeating it back to the sender. All subsequent bell messages are acknowledged promptly by repeating back to the sender – with the single exception of six strikes which indicate "Obstruction danger" which is not echoed back until all relevant signals have been set to "Stop".

== Example block-bell exchange ==
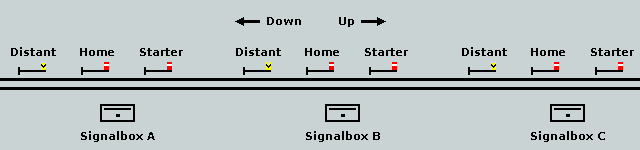
The location of signals at signal boxes A, B and C. Up is defined as being towards C, and only signals in the Up direction are shown for clarity. Our example train will travel in the Up direction.

An example is the process of signalling a train in the up direction (from A to C) past a signal box B. The signal box in rear is A and the signal box in advance is C. The block indicators at B are in the Normal position. The signalman at A "offers" the train to B by sending an "Is Line Clear?" code on the block bell; for example to offer an express passenger train, he sends four beats consecutively; an ordinary passenger train is offered by sending three beats, and after a pause one more beat, usually written as 3-1. If the signalman at B can accept the train safely (if the line is clear up to B's clearing point and will not need to be blocked by another train he "accepts" the train by repeating the bell signal, and placing the commutator on his block instrument for the section from A to "Line Clear". The "Line Clear" is repeated at box A, and allows the signalman at A to clear, or "pull off", his signals. In case the line is not clear, B simply does not acknowledge A's "Is Line Clear?", and leaves the commutator in the Normal position.

| Box | Sends | Meaning |
|---|---|---|
| A | 1 | Calling attention |
| B | 1 | Attending |
| A | 3-1 | Is line clear for a Class 2 train? |
| B | 3-1 | Line is clear for a Class 2 train. |

At this point, B will not clear any of his signals. Firstly, he cannot clear his starting signal without a "Line Clear" from C. As a result, B will not clear his home signal – he can only clear it when he either has a clear run through (which he does not have without a "Line Clear" from C), or is confident that the train will be able to stop at his starting (or section) signal (this is not done until the train is in view and visibly under control). Finally, his distant will not clear without both his home and starting signals being clear.

As the train passes the starting signal at A, the signalman there sends the "Train Entering Section" signal (2 beats) on the block bell to B, and the signalman at B acknowledges the signal and moves the commutator to "Train On Line". His lower indicator on the block indicator to A repeats the position of the commutator.

| Box | Sends | Meaning |
|---|---|---|
| A | 2 | Train entering section |
| B | 2 | I acknowledge your train entering section. |

B immediately offers the train on to C, after calling for attention, by sending the "Is Line Clear?" bell signal (repeating the same steps A had done while offering the train to B); if C accepts it, he repeats the bell signal and places his block indicator to "Line Clear", which moves the position of the upper needle indicator in B's block instrument to repeat that indication. B may now clear his signals for the train.

After an interval, the train will arrive and pass B; as it does so, B sends "Train Entering Section" on the block bell to C. Then C acknowledges the bell signal and places the block instrument to "Train On Line". As the train passes, he restores his signals to danger, and when the whole of the train passes B complete with tail lamp attached, B sends the "Train Out Of Section" bell signal (2-1) to A and when A acknowledges it, he places his block indicator to "Normal". The block section between A and B is now normal and A can offer B another train, if he has one.

| Box | Sends | Meaning |
|---|---|---|
| B | 1 | Calling attention |
| A | 1 | Attending |
| B | 2-1 | The train has now cleared the section |
| A | 2-1 | Acknowledging that the train has cleared the section |

When the train has reached C, the signalman there sends "Train Out Of Section" on the block bell and when B acknowledges it, C places the block indicator to "Normal".

== Bell codes ==
Bell codes are used to communicate with adjacent signal boxes. They can communicate information regarding the type of train being offered, the status of trains within sections or emergency information. A bell code is acknowledged as being understood by repetition.

Nearly all bell codes are preceded by a single stroke on the bell, referred to as Call Attention — the main exception being Train Entering Section. The Is Line Clear? bell signal describes the train, distinguishing between ordinary and express passenger trains, and various categories of goods train. In some locations, routing information is included in the bell code, such an ordinary passenger train to be routed to a branch at the signal box in advance would be offered by the bell code 1-3 instead of 3-1. These often vary by location.

=== Train classification ===
All trains, whether operated by a (passenger) train operating company (TOC) or a freight operating company (FOC), are allocated to one of ten classes, as set out below. It is a generalised guide intended to assist signalling staff in prioritising trains according to their importance as well as ensuring that any special instructions that may apply at a specific location are carried out. Passenger trains are generally classified in accordance with their stopping pattern while the classification of freight trains depends upon maximum permitted speeds. Class 1 trains (together with Class 9 services, which are officially their equivalent in this regard) have the highest priority, followed by Class 2 and then so on down the list.

| Class | Bell code | Type of train |
|---|---|---|
| 1 | 4 | Express passenger train; nominated postal or parcels train; breakdown train or snowplough going to clear the line |
| 2 | 3-1 | Ordinary passenger train; breakdown train not going to clear the line; officers' special train |
| 3 | 1-3-1 | Freight train capable of running at more than 75 mph; parcels train; nominated (priority) empty passenger trains; autumn railhead treatment train |
| 4 | 3-1-1 | Freight train that can run at up to 75 mph |
| 5 | 2-2-1 | Empty coaching stock |
| 6 | 5 | Freight train that can run at up to 60 mph |
| 7 | 4-1 | Freight train that can run at up to 45 mph |
| 8 | 3-2 | Freight train that can run at, or is timed to run at, 35 mph or less |
| 9 | 1-4 | Class 373 train (Eurostar); also used for any other specially authorized train and all trains on the new East London Line |
| 9 | 1-4-1 | Empty Class 373 train (Eurostar) |
| 0 | 2-3 | Light locomotive(s) |

=== Supplemental codes ===
These codes are supplemented by codes either side, to show the status of the train within the section or the section itself:

| Bell code | Meaning | Notes |
|---|---|---|
| 1 | Call attention | The attention signal is used to confirm that the called box is listening. A single bell is sent to the called box and repeated back to the calling box before each signal is sent. |
| 2 | Train entering section | Does not require "call attention", as the signalman knows he has accepted a train. |
| 2-1 | Train out of section | |
| 2-2 | Engine assisting in rear (known as 'bankers') sent after train entering section—normally to assist freight trains or long passenger trains up steep hills | |
| 3-3 | Blocking back outside Home Signal | Given to the signal box in rear if a shunting movement needs to enter the section. |
| 2-4 | Blocking back inside Home Signal | Given to the signal box in rear if a shunting movement will block the line between the home signal and the clearing point. |
| 3-3-2 | Shunt into forward section | Given to the signal box in advance if a shunting movement needs to enter the section. |
| 8 | Shunt withdrawn | Given to the signal box in advance after a shunting movement is complete and outside the section. |
| 3-3-4 | Train brought to a stand | Only sent on blocking back and shunt moves on a line on which it was travelling in the opposite direction to normal traffic. |
| 3-5-5 | Restricted acceptance | Sent in response to "Is Line Clear?", when authorised. The line is clear up to the home signal, but the line between the home signal and clearing point is blocked. The accepted train must be warned. |
| 3-3-5 | Line now clear to clearing point | |
| 5 - 5 | Train divided | Used in when a train has divided mid-section, and both parts are likely to pass through. |
| 5 - 2 | Release token – electric token block only | |
| 2 - 5 | Token replaced – electric token block only | |
| 3 - 5 | Cancelling | Cancels a 'Is Line Clear?' or 'Train entering section' code. |
| 5 - 3 | Train incorrectly described | Once acknowledged, the correct train description is sent. |
| 5-5-5 | Opening signal box | |
| 5-5-7 | Closing of signal box where a block switch is provided | |
| 7-5-5 | Closing of signal box | |
| 6 | Obstruction danger | Not preceded by "call attention" because it is used in an emergency. Signalman receiving it must immediately stop, using fixed signals and/or a red flag, any train travelling towards the signal box from which "obstruction danger" was sent; only once he is sure that this has been achieved should he respond. |
| 4 - 5 - 5 | Train proceeding without authority in the right direction | Sometimes known as "train running away" |
| 2-5-5 | Train proceeding without authority in the wrong direction Train proceeding without authority – electric token block only | Sometimes known as "train running away" |
| 7 | Stop and examine train | Should be followed, once acknowledged, by a telephone message explaining what is amiss. |
| 9 | Train passed without tail lamp – sent to signal box in advance | |
| 4-5 | Train passed without tail lamp – sent to signal box in rear | |
| 16 | Testing bells and block instruments | Performed every time a signal box is opened and every time two signal boxes are connected after an intermediate 'box is switched out. |

== See also ==
- Automatic block signaling – Railroad communications system
- Heritage railway
- Rule 55
- Saxby and Farmer
