= Overlap (railway signalling) =

An overlap in railway signalling is the length of track beyond a stop signal that is proved to be clear of vehicles in the controls of the previous signal, as a safety margin.

== Overview ==
Enough braking distance is provided to allow a train to comfortably stop at the stop signal, but should it fail to do so for any reason (fog, smoke, slippery rails, brake failure, inattention by driver, etc.) there is still some distance to allow the train to stop short of any obstruction, such as another train.

== Length ==
The length of an overlap may be a nominal length, or else calculated on the full emergency braking distance for the gradients and speeds for that particular section of line.

== Two signal protection ==
If the overlap is long enough to extend from one stop signal to the next, then the effect is to provide two signal protection (or "double blocking"), with the first signal having a full overlap, and the second signal having a short overlap.

With two signal protection, only one track circuit is needed between successive signals. However, overlaps may then be longer than is necessary with an adverse effect on headway.

With one signal protection, there may be two track circuits between successive signals, which has a cost, however headways can be optimised.

== Country practice ==
Overlap design vary widely with signalling practice in different countries and types of train protection systems. Many countries do not use overlaps at all.

=== Germany ===
In Germany the following distances before entry to a station or another critical point are used:

Maximum Speed			Required Overlap	
	km/h	mph	m	ft
>	60	37	200	660
≤	60	37	100	330
≤	40	25	50	160
≤	30	19	0	0

=== United Kingdom ===
(Typical values)

- Semaphore signalling: 400 m (1,310 ft) (previously defined as 440 yards (402 m))
- Colour light signals: 180 m (590 ft)
