= List of rail accidents (1900–1909) =

This is a list of rail accidents from 1900 to 1909.

== 1900 ==
- February 16 – United Kingdom – a Cleator and Workington Junction Railway freight train derailed when the formation was washed away by heavy rain.

February 20, 1900, Dublin.

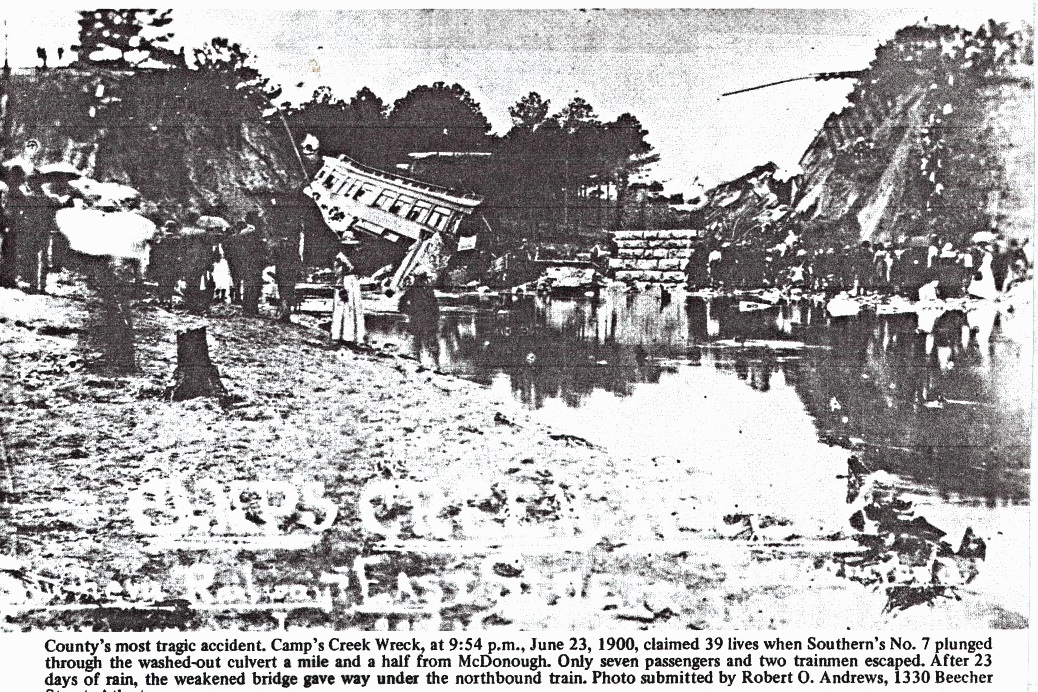
Camp Creek train wreck of 1900

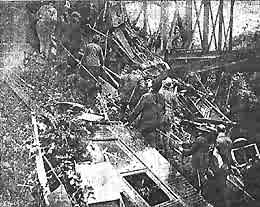
Tacoma wreck July 4, 1900

- February 20 – United Kingdom – A Dublin, Wicklow and Wexford Railway freight train overran the buffer stops at Harcourt Street station, Dublin (now in the Republic of Ireland) and ran through the end wall of the station. 0-6-0 locomotive Wicklow was suspended over Hatch Street immediately after the collision.
- April 30 – United States – The Cannonball Express pulled by Illinois Central 382, en route from Memphis, Tennessee to Canton, Mississippi, with John "Casey" Jones as engineer, collided with a stalled freight train at Vaughan, Mississippi. The engineer of the Cannonball, Casey Jones, was the only fatality.
- June 16 – United Kingdom – Slough rail accident - Slough. Great Western Railway express train from London Paddington ran into the rear of a local train at Slough station, killing five people and seriously injuring 35.
- June 23 – United States – Camp Creek train wreck – McDonough, Georgia: A Southern Railway train from Macon, Georgia bound for Atlanta ran into a washout over Camp Creek near McDonough and plunged 60 feet (18 m) into the swollen creek below before bursting into flames, killing 39 of the 49 aboard. The flagman, J.J. Quinlan, acted heroically, running all the way to town and alerting the telegraph operator to the disaster before procuring a length of rope and saving two female passengers.
- July 4 – United States – Tacoma streetcar disaster – An overloaded streetcar failed to negotiate a curve and plunged down an embankment near a trestle that spans today's South Tacoma Way in Tacoma, Washington. The disaster resulted in 43 deaths and approximately 65 injuries, many serious.
- July 24 – United Kingdom – A Midland Railway passenger train derailed at Amberswood, Lancashire killing one.
- August 30 – United States – On the Great Northern Railway, 18 loaded freight cars separated off the rear of an eastbound train, ran away backward, and after 16 miles (26 km) crashed into a business car at the rear of a westbound passenger train at Nyack, Montana. Three people were killed in the business car and 33, all railway employees, in the next car forward.
- September 8 - United States - 1900 Galveston Hurricane: A Gulf and Inter State Railroad passenger train was destroyed by a hurricane on a journey from the Bolivar Peninsula to Beaumont, Texas. All 85 people on board were killed.
- United States – The Lonesome Gap viaduct on the Knoxville, Cumberland Gap, and Louisville Railroad collapsed when a double-headed freight train drove over it, against standing orders that such trains were not to cross the viaduct.

== 1901 ==
- April 12 – United States – A head-end collision of a work train and a through freight train occurred near Pineville, Kentucky killing two.
- May 26 - United States - “Electric cars racing for a switch while running in opposite directions, at the rate of 40 miles per hour (64 km/h), cost five lives in the afternoon by a terrific collision, in which over forty prominent people were injured, some fatally and others seriously. The lobby of the local post office filled with dead and wounded, hysterical women and children looking for relatives and friends, surgeons administering temporary relief and ambulances racing through the city, taking the wounded to hospitals, were the early intimation of the accident. The scene of the accident was at a point about 2 miles (3.2 km) out of Greenbush, on the line of the Albany & Hudson railway. The point where the cars met on the single track was at a sharp curve, and so fast were both running and so sudden was the collision that the motormen never had time to put on the brakes before southbound car No. 22 had gone almost clean through the northbound car No. 17, and hung on the edge of a high bluff, with its load of shrieking, maimed humanity. One motorman was pinioned up against the smashed front of the southbound car, with both legs severed, and was killed instantly, while the other one lived but a few minutes.
  Fully 120 men, women and children formed a struggling, shrieking pyramid framed with blood, detached portions of human bodies and the wreckage of cars. Some of the more slightly injured of the men extricated themselves and began to pull people out of the rear ends of the two cars. Almost every one was taken out in this way, and nearly all were badly injured. With both motormen killed it was hard to get at the real cause of the accident, but it was pretty well determined that it was caused by an attempt of the south bound car to reach a second switch instead of waiting for the north bound car at the first siding.
  The cars weigh fifteen tons each and are the largest electric cars built, and so frightful was the crash that both cars were torn almost to splinters. Both cars were filled with Sunday pleasure seekers returning from the new recreation grounds that the railway had just opened."from the BROOKLYN EAGLE May 27, 1901.
  Sixteen months later tragedy struck again, and a young woman and a small boy were killed in a collision at Rossman's Station. Marjorie Hoysradt, 20, and Edward Doyle, 5, were among the "thousands of people" who had taken the railway's cars to enjoy a summer outing at Electric Park. According to The New York Times of August 2, 1902, cars were running at high speed to accommodate the crowds when the accident occurred.
- June 8 – United States – A double-header freight train collided with a stopped freight train carrying 12 tons of dynamite on the Delaware, Lackawanna, and Western Railroad in Vestal, New York killing five and injuring seven.
- October 29 – United States – Linwood, North Carolina. The second of two northbound special trains carrying part of Buffalo Bill's Wild West Show towards Danville collided head-on with a southbound Southern Railway freight train carrying a load of fertilizer. The engineer of the southbound train had been ordered to yield to the northbound traffic, but did not understand that there were two trains, setting up the head-on collision with the second train. The resulting crash severely injured Annie Oakley and killed many famous show animals, domestic and exotic, including fully 110 horses.
- November 27 – United States – Adrian, Michigan. Two trains of the Wabash Railroad collided 1 mile (1.6 km) east of Seneca, Michigan. The westbound train was carrying Italian immigrants going west from New York. Estimates of casualties ranged from twelve to 23 to 50-80 to 100 dead with at least 50 to 125 injured. The unknown dead were buried in Adrian's Oakwood Cemetery; the gravesite was marked September 25, 2016.
- December 6 – Germany – Frankfurt (Main) Hauptbahnhof. The luxury train Ostend-Vienna-Express, about 90 minutes late, reached the Frankfurt Terminus at about 5 a.m. The air brake failed due to a faulty valve which remained closed. The locomotive overran the buffer stop, shot across the head of the platform and crashed through the opposite wall behind which the restaurant for 1st- and 2nd-class passengers was situated. There it came to a stop in midst of the tables covered with white table cloths and set for breakfast. The photograph of this scene became a favorite in most publications on the history of the Frankfurt Central Station. Nobody was hurt in the accident. In this early morning hour not many people were around, and the carriages of the Ostend-Vienna-Express had separated from the locomotive and remained on the rails. After a short time they were on their way to Vienna again. Some of the sleeping passengers hadn't even noticed the incident. The Ostend-Vienna-Express carried through-coaches between Ostend and the Orient Express.
- December 22 – United Kingdom – Liverpool, Dingle railway station. The line of the Liverpool Overhead Railway (LOR) to Dingle railway station was worked by electrically powered trains. Access to this underground station was through a tunnel about one-half mile (800 m) long. On December 22, 1901, an engine of a train caught fire and the train stopped about 80 yards (73 m) before reaching the station. Soon all the train was on fire as well as the station. Six people died. This was the first major accident caused by an electrically powered train.

== 1902 ==
A scene after the Park Ave Tunnel crash, 1902

- January 8 – United States – New York City: A stopped New Haven express train from South Norwalk was rear-ended in the Park Avenue tunnel by a New York Central White Plains local, due to smoke and snow obscuring signals. Seventeen persons were killed and 36 injured, the worst rail accident in New York City history. The accident inspired the State Legislature to pass a law the next year prohibiting steam operation within the tunnels of New York City on the Park Avenue line south of the Harlem River.
- March 21 – United States – Paterson, New Jersey: A trolley car stalled on an Erie Railroad crossing after its pole lost contact with the overhead wire. As an express train approached, passengers evacuated the car. When the conductor reconnected the power, the trolley lurched backward, striking Mrs. Susan Simonton (wife of the Paterson Fire Captaion) and fatally injuring her 8-year-old son, Dewitt Simonton, who fell on the tracks and was decapitated. The accident occurred in front of bystanders and received national press attention.
- March 30 – South African Republic – Barberton rail crash – Between Barberton and Kaapmuiden, a passenger train ran away descending a gradient toward a sharp curve and a bridge over a gully where it derailed and one car fell into the gully killing at least 44 passengers.
- August 2 - United States - Albany Southern Railway - A young woman and a small boy were killed in a collision at Rossman's Station (near Albany, NY). Marjorie Hoysradt, 20, and Edward Doyle, 5, were among the "thousands of people" who had taken the railway's cars to enjoy a summer outing at Electric Park (on Kinderhook Lake in Niverville, NY). According to The New York Times of August 2, 1902, cars were running at high speed to accommodate the crowds when the accident occurred.
- August 5 - United States - A Norfolk and Western Railway coal train fell though a trestle under repair near Peebles, Ohio. 1 killed and 4 injured.
- August 16 – Canada – A Canadian Pacific Railway westbound freight train ran into the tail end of a stopped freight train. This incident occurred about 200 yards (180 m) east of the station depot at Maple Creek, Saskatchewan. The train crew members involved were unhurt but the body of a suspected hobo was found as the wreckage was cleared.
- September 1 – United States – A Southern Railway train derailed at Berry, Alabama, killing 21 people.
- September 11 – British India – A mail train plunged into a river at Mangapatnam due to a bridge washout. At least 100 people were killed.
- September 27 – France – A signalman's error diverted a Chemins de Fer du Nord express to Cambrai into a siding at Arleux. Most of the train cars derailed; 20 people were killed and 41 injured.
- December 6 – Canada – Nova Scotia, Six persons were killed in a wreck on the Intercolonial Railway, the Canadian Government railway, at noon near the station at Belmont, seventy miles (110 km) from Halifax. An express train for Montreal rolled down an embankment, completely wrecking the locomotive, the postal, express, and baggage cars and several passenger cars.
- December 20 – United States – Byron, California. The southbound Stockton Flyer crashed into the rear of the disabled Los Angeles Owl, killing 20 and injuring 25. Both trains had departed from Oakland. Prominent California lawyer Frank Hamilton Short and journalist Chester Harvey Rowell were passengers on board the Owl. Neither was injured.
- December 26 – Canada – Wanstead, Ontario. On the Grand Trunk Railway near Sarnia, a westbound passenger express collided head-on with a freight train. Around thirty people were killed.

== 1903 ==
- January 27 – United States – The engineer of the Central Railroad of New Jersey Reading Express was distracted by engine trouble and failed to see signals. At Graceland, Scotch Plains, New Jersey, the train crashed into the rear of another passenger train that was slowed by a hot box killing 23.
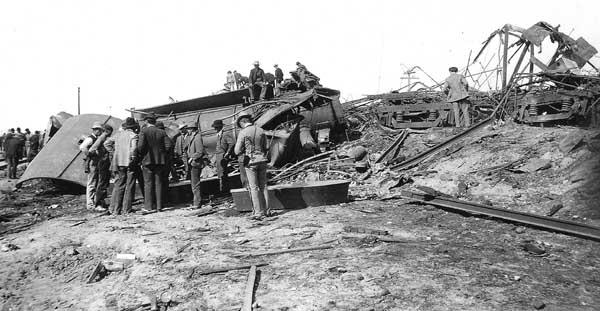
- Esmond Train Wreck
  January 28 – United States – Esmond Train Wreck – 14 people, including the engineers of both trains, were killed when the Benson, Arizona-bound Crescent City Express (No. 8) collided head-on at 3:30 am with the Tucson, Arizona-bound Pacific Coast Express (No. 7) due to a communication error. A night operator did not deliver a second order to the conductor, which would have superseded the previous order for the Crescent City Express (No.8) to proceed to Vail Station. Had the second order been delivered, it would have allowed the Pacific Coast Express (No.7) to pass unscathed.
- March 18 – Canada – Two Canadian Pacific Railway freight trains collided head-on near Etobicoke (Islington), Ontario.
- June 27 – Spain – A train on the line between Bilbao and Zaragoza derailed at San Asensio and fell into a river, killing 90 to 100 people and injuring 63.
- July 7 – United States – Due to a misread train order, a passenger and a freight train on the Southern Railway collided at Rockfish, Virginia, killing 19 passengers and four crew members.
- July 15 – United Kingdom – A passenger train derailed at Waterloo, on the Lancashire and Yorkshire Railway, due to excessive speed killing seven and injuring thirty.
- July 27 – United Kingdom – Glasgow St Enoch rail accident, Scotland: A train crashed into the buffers killing 16.
- August 1 – United Kingdom – A passenger train was run into by another train at Preston, Lancashire.
- August 7 – United States – Two special trains carrying the Benjamin Wallace Circus collided at Durand, Michigan, killing 22 people, two camels, and an elephant. The second train's driver had failed to notice a warning flare when the first train stopped, and his brakes were not properly charged.
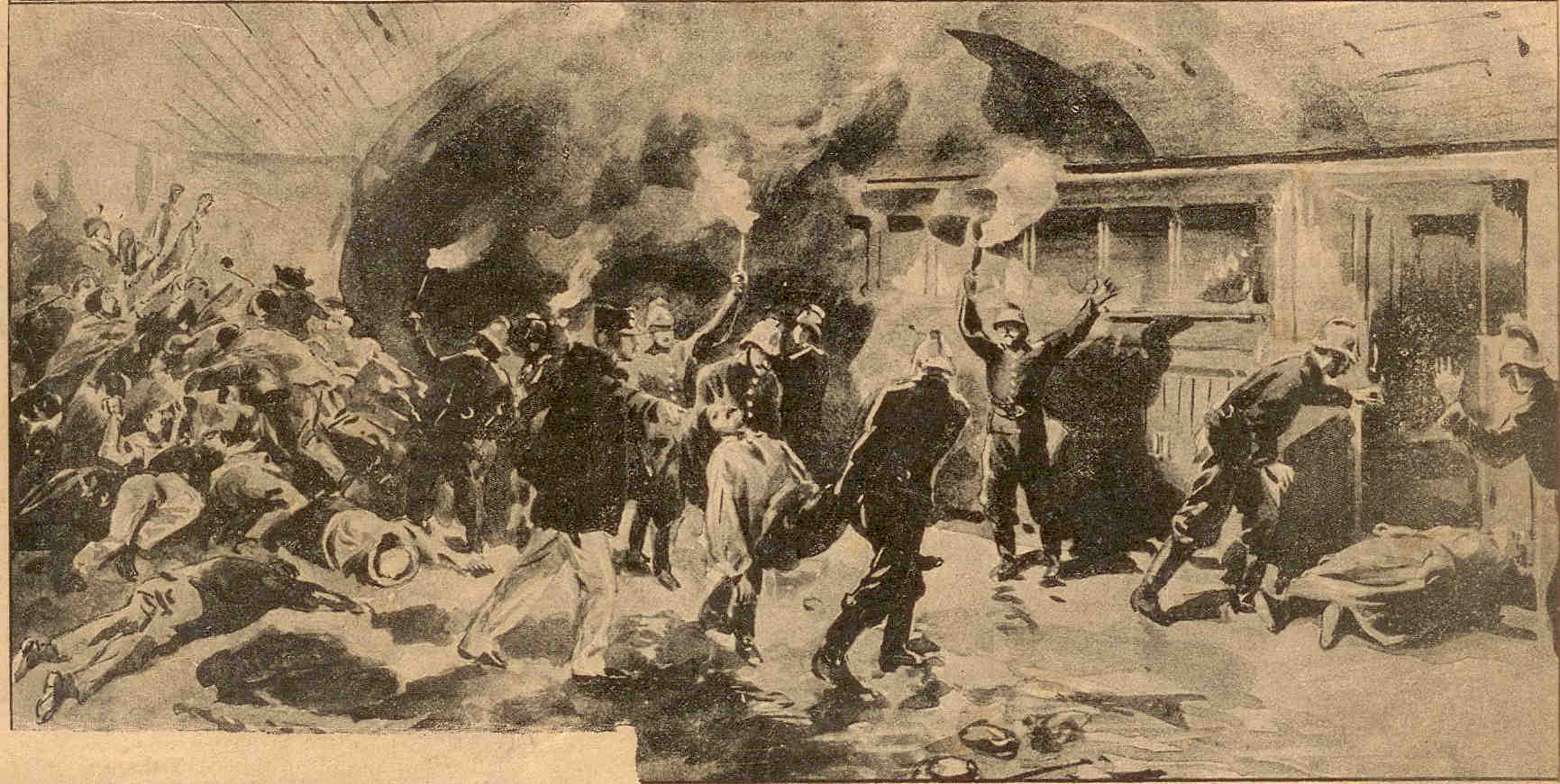
- Paris Métro train fire
  August 10 – France – Paris Métro train fire: electrical fire on the Paris Métro near Couronnes station killed 84. This led to the adoption of multiple-unit train control (with a low-voltage control circuit) and a second, independent power supply for station lighting.
- August 23 – United States – Little Falls Gulf Curve crash of 1903, Little Falls, New York: Westbound New York Central special newspaper train derailed due to excessive speed on a sharp curve killing the engine crew.
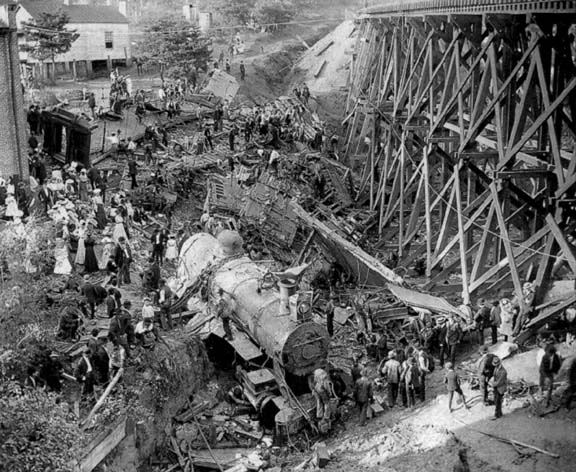
- The aftermath of the Wreck of the Old 97. (September 27, 1903)
  September 27 – United States – Wreck of the Old 97, Danville, Virginia: Southbound Southern Railway passenger train No. 97, en route from Monroe, Virginia to Spencer, North Carolina, derailed at Stillhouse Trestle near Danville and plunged into the ravine below. Eleven are killed including the engine crew and a number of Railway Post Office clerks in the mail car right behind the tender. The wreck inspired a famous ballad, The Wreck of the Old 97, the 1920s recording of which by country singer Vernon Dalhart is sometimes cited as the American recording industry's first million-seller.
- October 22 – United Kingdom – A Lancashire and Yorkshire Railway express passenger train collided with a light engine at Sowerby Bridge, Yorkshire due to a signalman's error killing one.
- October 23 – United States – Hebron, Indiana. A head-on collision; one of the worst wrecks in the history of the Pennsylvania Railroad.
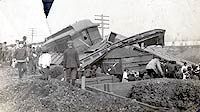
- The first coach of the Big Four special, where the Purdue football team was seated, lies crushed between the second coach and a coal tender. (October 31, 1903)
  October 31 – United States – The Purdue Wreck, Indianapolis, Indiana: A Cleveland, Cincinnati, Chicago, and St. Louis Railroad football special carrying the Purdue University football team and fans to the annual Indiana University / Purdue University football game collided with a coal train killing seventeen passengers in the first coach, including fourteen members of the football team.
- November 2 - United States - Two cars of Nitroglycerin in Crestline, Ohio's trainyard explode, leaving a crater 20 feet (6.1 m) wide and 40 feet (12 m) long, massive damage to the yard and 45 other cars rendered unusable.
- November 11 - Canada - a Canadian Pacific Railway freight train collided head-on with another freight train at Indian Head, Saskatchewan damaging both trains. The engineer was charged with "driving an engine while in a state of intoxication" and referred to the Supreme Court of Canada.
- November 14 – United States – The crew of a broken-down train at Kentwood, Louisiana failed to protect it and the following train ran into it, killing 32 people are injuring many more.
- December 2 – United States - Two trains collided in the town of Greenwood, Delaware during a blinding snowstorm, one loaded with cars of dynamite and naphtha, a petroleum liquid used to make lighter fluid. The result was a violent explosion that rained fire down upon the town, killing two people and injuring dozens, while leveling every building in the area of the wreck and setting several fires including nine houses, the schoolhouse, a hotel, and numerous freight cars. Reports were that every pane of glass in every building in the town broke. The explosion was felt across Sussex, Kent, and Caroline counties, but help was not quick to arrive as there was no local Fire Company and all phone and telegraph lines in the town had been severed by the explosion. Eventually crews from Seaford Volunteer Fire Department and Harrington Fire Company arrived the next day to find the explosion had cut a hole big enough to bury the freight engine, homes literally turned on their sides from the blast, and much of the town destroyed, burned, or damaged. Over a week later, the Washington Post reported that it was not dynamite, but a secret military explosive that was loaded on the train and had caused the explosion, as investigators found the damage to be far too great for the reported contents of the train. The freight car in question had been loaded by the government and was en route to a facility in Newport News, Virginia containing, "a quantity of new explosive, a terrible instrument of death".
- December 23 – United States – Connellsville train wreck near Connellsville, Pennsylvania killed 66 people as the Baltimore and Ohio Railroad's Duquesne Limited ran into timber dropped from a freight train.
- December 23 – United Kingdom – A Hull and Barnsley Railway passenger train collided with wagons on the line at Locomotive Junction, Springhead, Northumberland.

== 1904 ==
- February 19 - United States - Two Southern Pacific trains collide at Jackson, Utah. A carload of dynamite explodes, wrecking everything within a half-mile (800 m) radius, including the majority of lives within the town of 45.
- February 27 - United States - Two trains collide at Port Richmond, California. 2 people killed and 7 injured.
- March – United Kingdom – A South Eastern and Chatham Railway passenger train derailed at Gomshall, Surrey.
- July 3 – United States – A Wabash Railroad train derailed on a sabotaged switch at Litchfield, Illinois killing twenty-four.
- July 18 - United States - An Erie Railroad train that stopped for water had a rear collision with another train on a curve at Greenwood Lake, New York, killing sixteen and injuring sixty.
- August 7 – United States – Eden Train Wreck, near Eden Station north of Pueblo, Colorado. A train was caught in bridge washaway, killing 89. Twenty-two additional passengers were listed as missing.
- August 14 – United States – Shelby County, Ohio. Two electric trains collided killing four and injuring thirty.
- August 31 – Canada – Richmond, Quebec, a head-on collision between a Grand Trunk Railway special train from Montreal to Sherbrooke, and Passenger Train No. 5 from Island Pond, Vermont killed nine including Member of Parliament Jean Baptiste Blanchet, and injured 23.

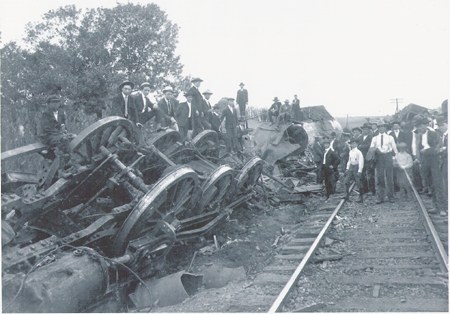
New Market train Wreck

- September 24 – United States – New Market train wreck, Jefferson County, Tennessee, two Southern Railway passenger trains, the Carolina Special and Local train No. 15, collided head-on near New Market, Tennessee when the crew of the three-car local failed to take the siding to allow the Carolina Special to pass. The impact knocked the boilers off both locomotives and the engine on the local was catapulted onto the first three wooden coaches of the Special. The impact caused the boilers of both locomotives to explode and the cars of the local passenger train to telescope. At the time, it was the worst wreck of its kind to ever occur in North America. Between 56 and 113 were killed.
- October 10 – United States – Warrensburg, Missouri, an eastbound Missouri Pacific Railroad passenger train, en route to the St. Louis World's Fair, collided head-on with a freight train killing twenty-seven and injuring thirty.
- November 26 – United Kingdom – Forden, Powys, Wales. Caused by a collision between a passenger train and a goods train. Seven people were injured.
- December 23 – United Kingdom – Aylesbury, Buckinghamshire, England. The 2:45 a.m. Great Central Railway express newspaper train from London Marylebone to Manchester derailed as it approached Aylesbury railway station from the south, approximately at the location of the junction with the Great Western Railway branch from Princes Risborough. Its speed carried the wreckage along the platforms of the station, and four of those on board the train, including the driver and fireman of the engine, and another driver and fireman travelling as passengers back to their home depot were killed. Two others, both railway staff, were seriously injured. A southbound train, from Manchester, then collided with the wreckage at low-speed causing damage to rolling stock but no further casualties.
- United Kingdom – A Great Western Railway passenger train derailed at Loughor Bridge, Glamorgan killing five and injuring eighteen. Excessive speed was a major contributory factor.

== 1905 ==
- January 19 – United Kingdom – A Midland Railway express passenger train overran signals and collided with the rear or another train at Cudworth, Yorkshire killing seven people.
- March 10 – United Kingdom – A mixed train on the 3 ft (914 mm)-gauge Ravenglass and Eskdale Railway derailed due to a combination of a faulty locomotive and faulty track.
- April 21 – United Kingdom – A London & North Western Railway passenger train collided with a train of carriages being shunted at Huddersfield killing two people. The train being shunted had passed a danger signal.
- May 11 – United States – The engineer of a Pennsylvania Railroad freight train stopping at Harrisburg, Pennsylvania applied the brakes too abruptly causing the unbraked cars at the rear to derail the ones in front of them, fouling an adjacent track where they were struck by the Cincinnati Express. The derailed cars contained 50,000 pounds (23,000 kg) of dynamite which exploded killing twenty passengers and three railwaymen.
- June 17 – United States – Patapsco train collision – Patapsco, Carroll County, Maryland: Two trains collided head-on on the Western Maryland Railroad due to a failure to obey train orders killing 26.
- June 21 - United States - 20th Century Limited derailment - The New York Central Railroad's flagship passenger train, the 20th Century Limited, is derailed in an apparent act of sabotage in Mentor, Ohio, killing 21.
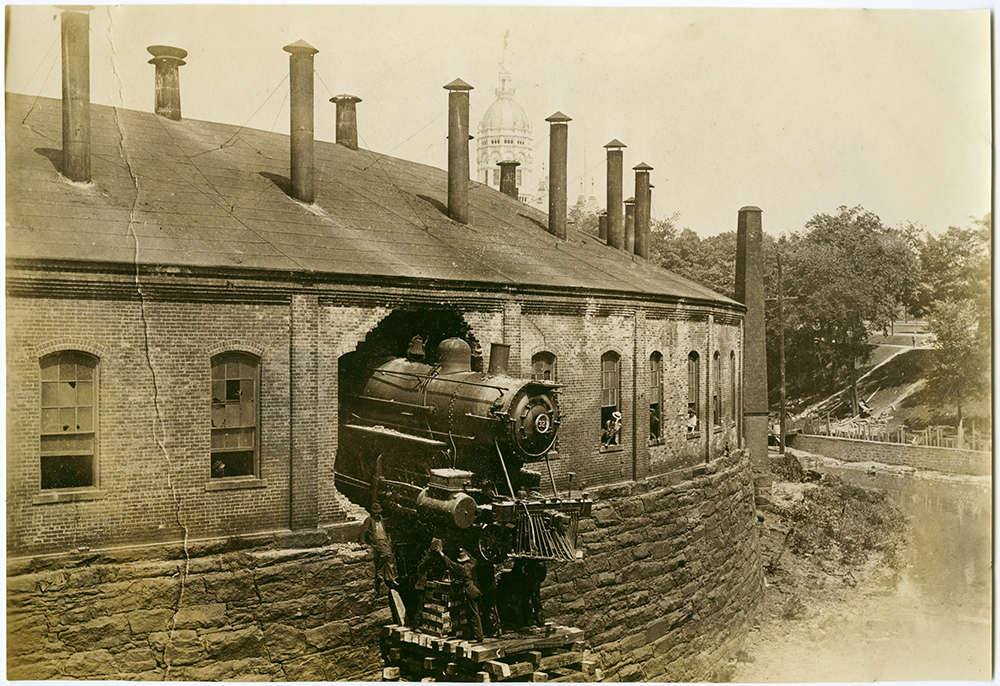
- New York, New Haven and Hartford Locomotive No. 321 crash July 8, 1905
  July 8 - United States- New York, New Haven and Hartford Locomotive No. 321 crashed through roundhouse, Hartford CT.
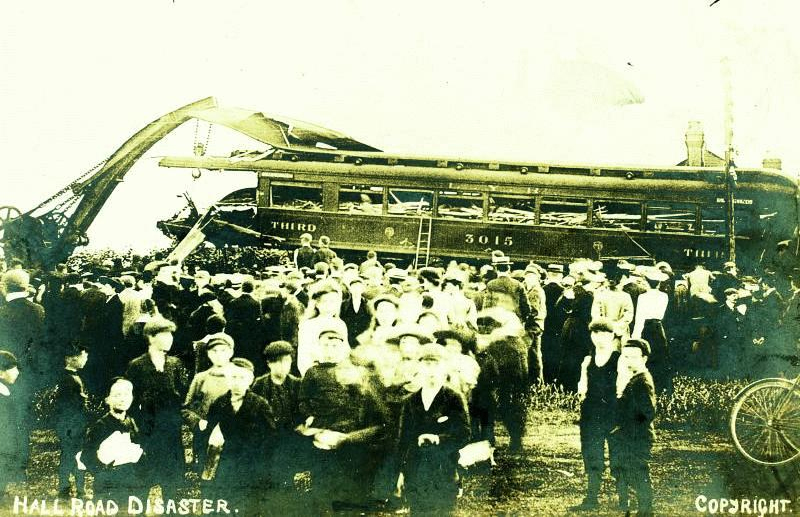
- Hall Road rail accident
  July 27 – United Kingdom – The Hall Road rail accident, on the Liverpool, Lancashire-to-Southport line, killed 21.
- August 7 – Germany – between Spremberg and Schleife on (Berlin-Görlitz railway), a head-on crash, caused by an error by a dispatcher, killed 19 and seriously injured 40.
- August 17 – United States – An Atlantic Coast Line excursion train carrying six cars of black passengers from Kinston, North Carolina, to Norfolk, Virginia, ran through an open drawbridge near Bruce Station, 6 mi (10 km) from Norfolk. The locomotive and first car were submerged in 12 ft (3.7 m) of water, and two more cars left the track; at least three people were killed, and a total of 20 to 30 were killed or injured, including the bridge tender.
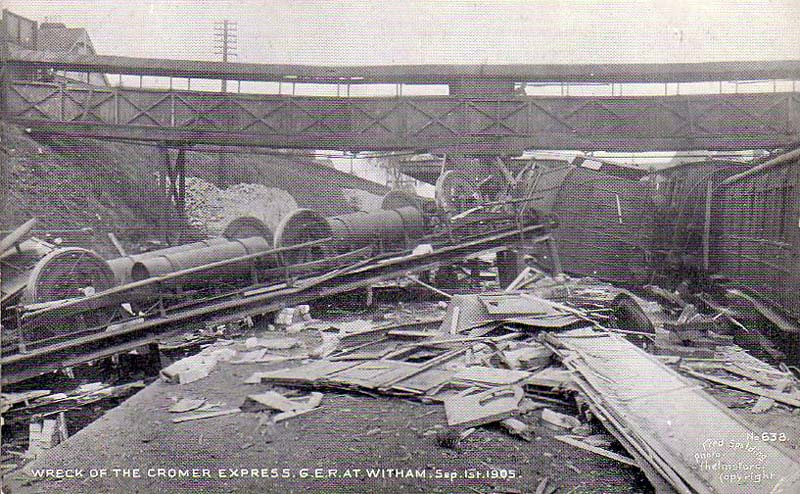
- Witham rail crash
  September 1 – United Kingdom – The Witham rail crash in Essex killed 11 and injured 71.
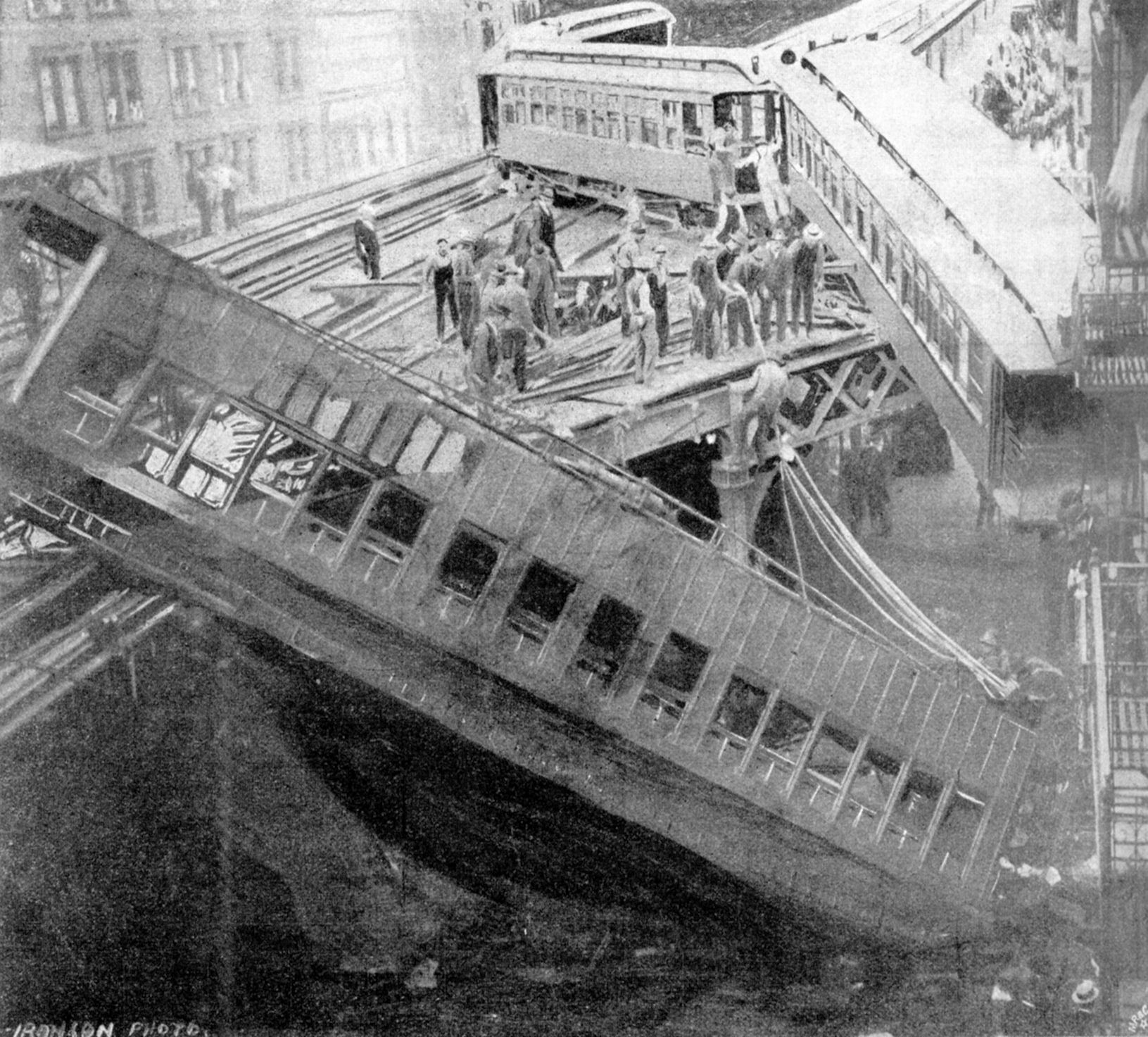
- Beginning cleanup after the Ninth Avenue derailment; picture from the German Elektrotechnische Zeitschrift of November 2, 1905
  September 11 – United States – Ninth Avenue derailment, Manhattan, New York. A southbound train on the IRT Ninth Avenue Line was erroneously switched onto the 53rd Street curve to the Sixth Avenue line killing 13 and seriously injuring 48.
- October 6 – Russia – At Rostov, a derailment of the mail train to Vladivostok killed 27 people and injured 35.
- October 24 – United Kingdom – a North Eastern Railway double-headed freight train derailed at Winston, County Durham after platelayers had removed a rail before it passed.
- November 2 – United States – Baker Bridge train wreck in Lincoln, Massachusetts. The collision of an express train into a stopped local train killed 17.
- December 6 – United Kingdom – Charing Cross roof collapse – The roof of Charing Cross station in London collapsed, killing six people.
- December 31 – Russia – A collision at Lebedyn station (now in Ukraine) killed 30 people.
- December 31 – Russia – Two military trains collided between Znamenska and Trepovka killing twenty soldiers.

== 1906 ==
- March 16 – United States – Two passenger trains collided head-on near Adobe Station, between Portland and Florence, Colorado, on the Denver & Rio Grande Railroad, due to a train dispatcher's error; thirty-four people were killed.
- April 6 – United Kingdom – A passenger train derailed and fouled the adjacent line at Kirtlebridge, Dumfriesshire. The wreckage was hit by another passenger train killing one and injuring several others.
- June 26 – United States – Carson Hill, California: A four-car freight train on the Sierra Railway's Angel's Branch carrying 15 short tons (14 t) of dynamite exploded. The blast was reportedly heard in Stockton, California, 80 miles (130 km) to the east and a wheel from the boxcar carrying the dynamite was found embedded in the roof of a shed 5 miles (8.0 km) away; two crewmen were killed.

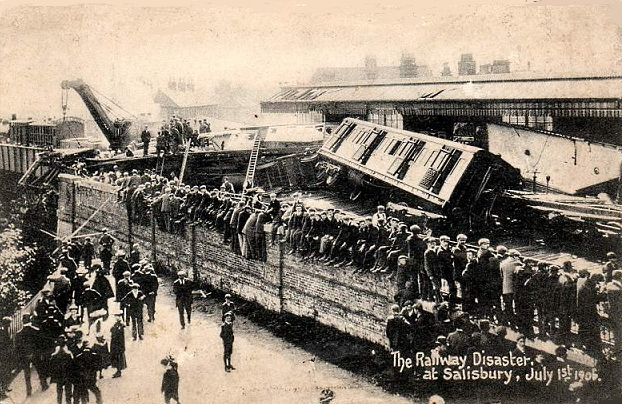
Salisbury train crash 1906

- June 30 – United Kingdom – Salisbury rail crash, Salisbury, England: A speeding express train derailed and collided with a milk train on a sharp curve killing 28 (24 passengers, 4 crew).
- August 13 – United States – Elizabeth, New Jersey: Four boys were killed on the Pennsylvania Railroad tracks by an Eastbound Express. The accident occurred where three levels of tracks crossed over Broad Street.
- September 8 – United States – Woodlands, West Virginia Two Trains collusion on bridge; 2 killed and 5 injured.
- September 18 – United States – Dover, Oklahoma Territory: A bridge across the Cimarron River collapsed beneath a Rock Island train bound for Fort Worth, Texas from Chicago. The bridge was a temporary structure unable to withstand the pressure of debris and high water. Replacement with a permanent structure had been delayed by the railroad for financial reasons. Estimates of the number of fatalities range from 4 to over 100.

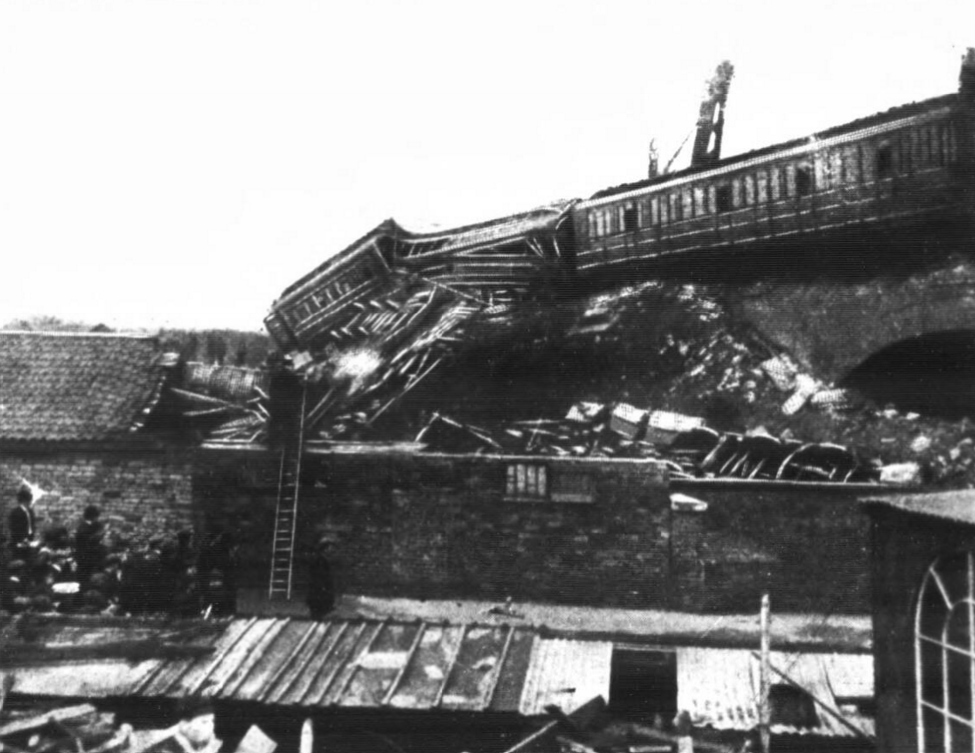
September 19, 1906 Grantham rail accident

- September 19 – United Kingdom – Grantham rail accident, Grantham, England: An evening sleeping-car and mail train from London to Edinburgh that should have stopped at Grantham, failed to do so; no definite reason was ever established. The points beyond the station had not yet been set, and the train ran onto a sharp curve and derailed, killing 14 people.

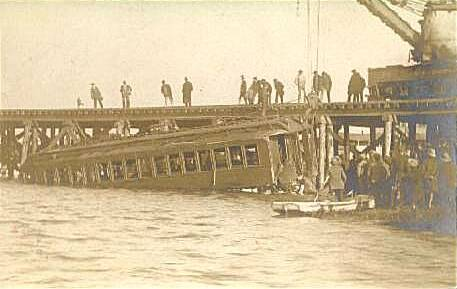
October 28, 1906 Atlantic City train crash

- October 28 – United States – 1906 Atlantic City train wreck: On the newly electrified West Jersey and Seashore Railroad a Sunday afternoon passenger train, traveling towards Atlantic City, New Jersey at forty miles per hour (64 km/h), derailed on a draw (swing) bridge over a deep tidal channel. The train bumped along the ties for 150 feet (46 m) before departing the bridge and plunging into deep water. Fifty-three died in what was the worst U.S. drawbridge accident until the Newark Bay, New Jersey rail accident of September 15, 1958.
- November 12 – United States – At Woodville, Porter County, Indiana, on the Baltimore and Ohio Railroad, the crew of an eastbound freight did not realize that westbound passenger train 47 was running in two sections and collided with the second section killing 43.
- November 24 – United Kingdom – A North Eastern Railway freight train runs into the rear of another at Ulleskelf, Yorkshire because its driver was racing a Lancashire and Yorkshire Railway express passenger train on an adjacent line and not keeping a lookout for his signals.
- December 28 – United Kingdom – Elliot Junction rail accident, Scotland: On the joint line of the North British and Caledonian Railways, a major snowstorm led to many delays, the derailment of a freight train, and a collapse of telegraph lines that left the block signalling inoperative. Rather than staff being called out to assist trains with hand signals and detonators, drivers were told to proceed with caution. One driver, moving at about 30 mph (50 km/h) in very poor visibility, crashes into a standing train, killing his fireman and 21 passengers.
- December 30 – United States – 1906 Washington DC train wreck: A Baltimore and Ohio Railroad locomotive running at full speed ran into a passenger train that had just pulled out of Terra Cotta (now Fort Totten) Station along the B&O Metropolitan Branch, telescoping the rear cars and taking the lives of fifty-three passengers.

== 1907 ==
- January 2 - United States - Livingston, Montana, at Coal Spur, at 2:30 a.m., Northern Pacific Railway Co Engineer James Caruso and Conductor John Storrs were instantly killed in a two-train collision.
- January 2 – United States – At Volland, Kansas, a Rock Island Railroad operator, who obtained his position assisting the dispatcher by falsifying his age and experience, failed to ensure that the westbound California Fast Mail, which was waiting for an eastbound train, received an order to wait for a second one. It departed and collided with the second train. Thirty passengers on the Mail were killed, as well as a tramp riding the roof of the eastbound train.
- January 16 – United Kingdom – Thingley Junction, Chippenham. A head-on collision between two Great Western Railway locomotives, River class 2–4–0 No. 70 "Dart" and Dean Goods No 2448 badly damaged both engines; both were unsalvageable and cut up on site.
- February 16 – United States – A train on the newly electrified New York Central Railroad Harlem Division rounded a curve and jumped the tracks at Woodlawn Station, resulting in 20 deaths and 150 injuries. The accident was attributed to a design flaw in the new electric engines.
- March 12 - United States - A Chesapeake and Ohio Railway train rear-ended the caboose of another train in the New River Gorge near Sewell, West Virginia at 3:20 a.m., killing a conductor and injuring a brakeman.
- March 12 - United States - Just after 9 a.m. on the same morning as the previous accident, the Chesapeake and Ohio's Fast Flying Virginian passenger train was westbound from Washington, D.C., when it hit a small rockslide just east of Hinton, West Virginia. The engine and tender overturned fatally scalding the engineer and a fireman. No passengers were injured.

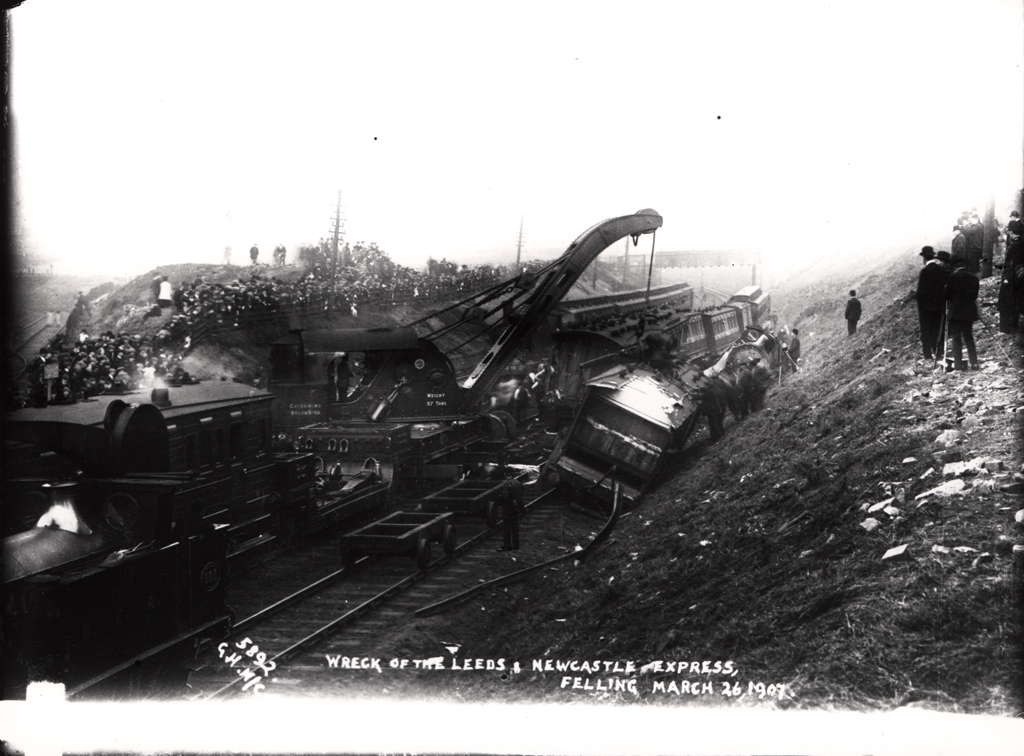
Aftermath of Felling derailment. (March 26, 1907)

- March 26 – United Kingdom – A passenger train derailed on buckled track at Felling, County Durham. The signalman reportedly had been warned of the buckle by a member of the public but refused to stop the trains over the affected lines. Two people were killed and six seriously injured.
- March 28 – United States – The Southern Pacific Railroad train, the Sunset, running nine to ten hours late, coming downgrade from San Timoteo Canyon at 60 miles per hour (97 km/h) hits a "misplaced switch" at Colton, California, and smashes into a ditch at the east end of the yard. Nine of 14 cars are demolished, killing 24 passengers and two crew. This will remain Southern California's worst rail accident in terms of deaths until the Santa Fe Redondo Junction train wreck in January 1956.
- April 14 – United States – Blossvale crash of 1907 – Annsville, New York. A two-steam-engine-sixty-car freight train derailed killing one fireman.
- May 11 – United States – A Southern Pacific Railroad special excursion train carrying Shriners from Buffalo, New York derailed approximately 65 miles (105 km) north of Santa Barbara, California between Point Concepcion the mouth of the Santa Ynez River killing 32 people and injuring many others.
- May 11 - United States - A Santa Fe Railroad passenger train derailed 1 mile (1.6 km) west of Joseph City, Arizona due to failure of a baggage car truck that was not sufficiently sized for the speed of the train. Several people were injured.
- May 21 - United States - New York Central Railroad passenger train collided with a derailed Buffalo and Cleveland special freight train, just outside of Little Falls, NY. One man died, two were critically injured (one of whom later died) and three more people were injured.
- July 20 – United States – A freight train and passenger train on the Pere Marquette Railway collided head-on near Salem, Michigan, because the freight train crew misinterpreted the intent of a badly written train order. Thirty people were killed.
- August 4 – France – A bridge at Les Ponts-de-Cé collapsed under a Chemins de fer de l'État train running from Angers to Poitiers. The locomotive, tender, and two cars fell into the Loire; 27 people were killed and 15 injured.
- August 28 – United Kingdom – A North Eastern Railway freight train overran signals and derailed at Goswick, Northumberland killing two and seriously injuring one.
- September 3 – Canada – Horseshoe Curve Wreck on the Canadian Pacific Railway – Between Cardwell and Caledon, Ontario. Seven people were killed and 114 injured (out of about 600) in the wreck, which was caused by high speed.
- September 15 – United States – Canaan train wreck – On the Boston and Maine Railroad, northbound freight train 267 received a train order referring to southbound passenger train 34 instead of train 30, the Quebec-to-Boston Express, which was 20 minutes ahead of it and was heavily loaded with passengers returning from the Sherbrooke Fair. Consequently, the trains collided at 4:26 a.m. on a foggy Sunday morning, 4 miles (6.4 km) west of Canaan station; 26 people were killed and 17 were seriously injured.
- September 19 – Mexico – Encarnación: an express passenger train for El Paso, Texas, collided with a freight train that should have waited for it; about 63 people were killed and 43 injured. Reportedly, the engineer of the freight fled home to the United States, was arrested, and admitted responsibility.
- September 28 – United Kingdom – The Newport rail accident in Newport, Wales killed one person.

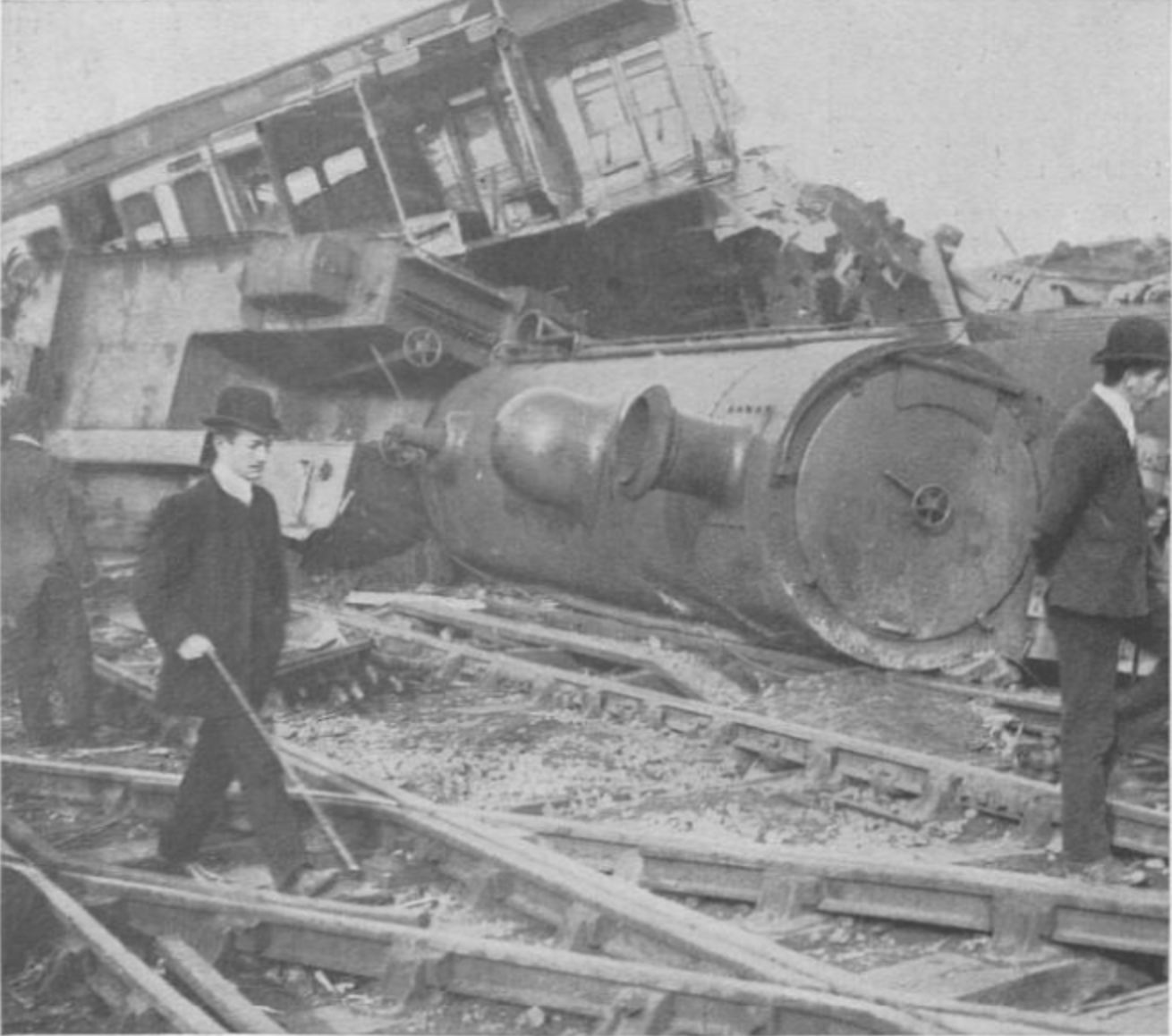
Shrewsbury train accident October 1907

- October 15 – United Kingdom – Shrewsbury rail accident, Shrewsbury, England: An evening sleeping-car and mail train from Manchester to the west of England derailed on a sharp curve, probably due to driver error, killing 18.
- October 26 – United Kingdom – At West Hampstead station on the Metropolitan Railway in London, the signalman thought a train had left and overrode the interlocking so that he could accept the following train. In fact, the first train was still standing at the platform, concealed by a thick fog. Both trains were electric multiple units and when they collided the leading car of the second train telescoped into the rear car of the first. Three people were killed and eleven seriously injured.
- November 25 – Spain – An express to Valencia derailed just before a bridge between Cambrils and Hospitalet, and most of the train fell into a river. Of about 70 to 90 people on board, at least 20 were killed and all but two of the rest were injured.
- December 25 – India – Two passenger trains collided killing 22 people due to a stationmaster's error with a train order. The source gives the location only as "North-Western State".

== 1908 ==
- January 4 – Canada – A broken rail caused the derailment of the eastbound express passenger train near Biscotasing, Ontario on the Lake Superior Division of the Canadian Pacific Railway killing two and injuring many.
- February 2 – United Kingdom – The driver of a Great Central Railway train knocked himself and his fireman out when he sneezed. The train derailed due to excessive speed at Ryhill, Yorkshire.

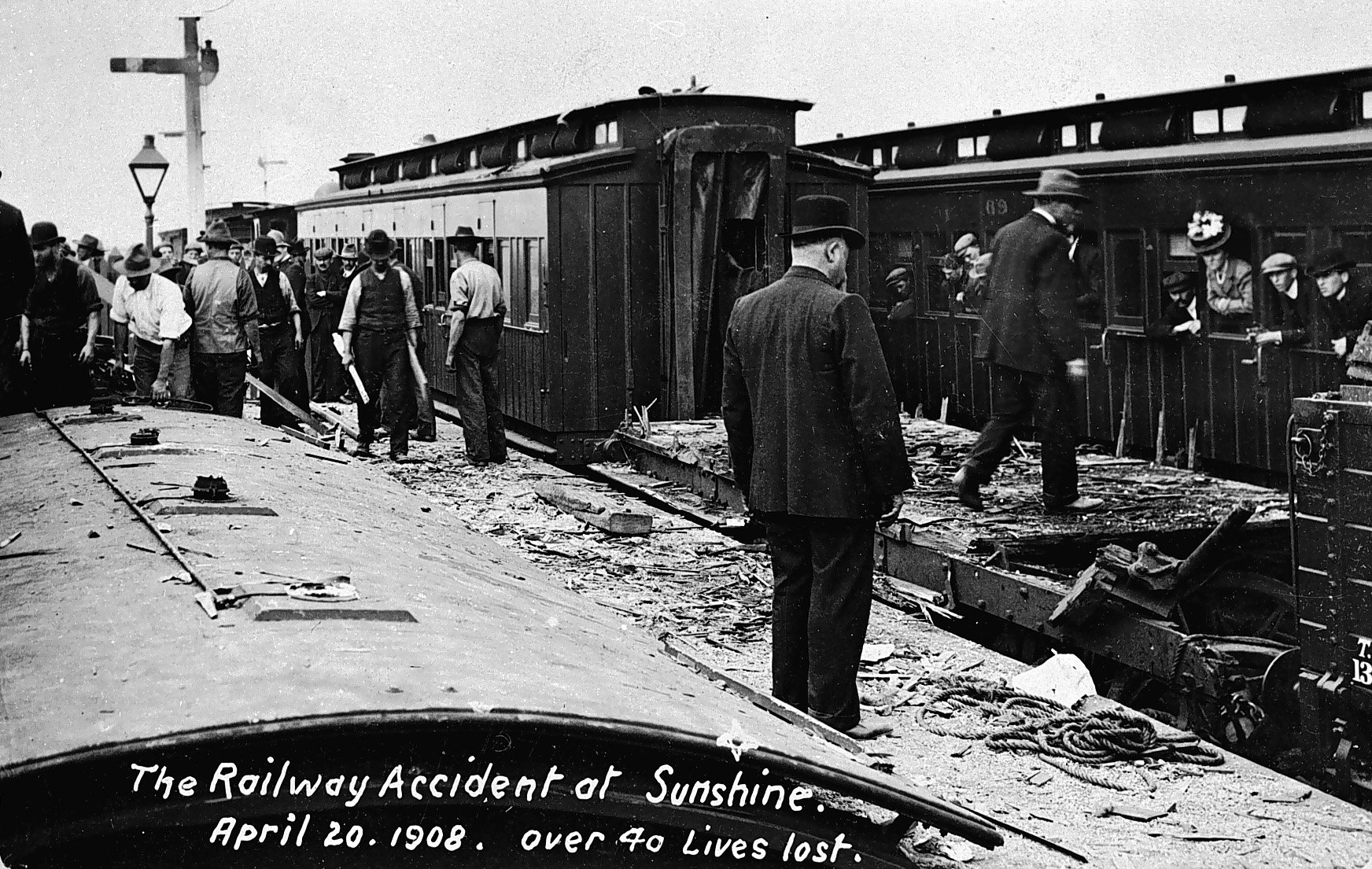
Railway Accident, Sunshine, Victoria, Apr 1908

- April 20 – Australia – Sunshine train disaster, Melbourne: Rear-end collision due to heavy fog, it killed 44 and injured around 400. It would be Australia's deadliest train disaster for over 50 years until it was eclipsed by the Granville train disaster which killed 84 on January 18, 1977.
- April 25 – Mexico – A train carrying pilgrims from the shrine to Our Lady of Guadalupe collided at Gargantua siding, near Maltrata killing 28.
- May 21 – Belgium – An express train was diverted into a bay platform occupied by a passenger train at Kontich due to a signalman's error. Forty people were killed and over 100 injured.
- May – India – A tablet system failure allowed two tablets to be issued for passenger trains on the same section. They collided head-on between Dasna and Ghaziabad, Uttar Pradesh, and burned so intensely as to prevent an accurate count of the dead. About 120 were killed and over 50 injured.
- July 8 - Canada - In Alberta near Medicine Hat, the Spokane Flyer and a passenger train from Lethbridge suffered a head on collision, resulting in 7 deaths, including the drivers of both trains. The drivers of each locomotive, Bob Twohey of the Lethbridge train and J. Nickelson of the Flyer respectively, had both reported seeing a phantom locomotive at the same stretch of track on different occasions prior to the accident. These details were not disclosed until fireman Gus Day, who was present for both encounters, shared the story in 1966.
- July 28 – Canada – The Pacific Express passenger train was operating in two sections. At Hemlo, Ontario on the Lake Superior Division of the Canadian Pacific Railway, the following section of the Pacific Express passenger train ran into the rear of the section ahead killing one passenger and injuring others.
- August 25 – United States – In Asheville, North Carolina a southern railway freight train was washed out between Saluda and Flat Rock. As a result, one was left dead and one seriously injured.
- August 25 – United States – Seaboard Railway train number 74, Lumpkin, Georgia. Heavy rain caused the tracks to collapse causing the engine to roll over killing the engineer and fireman. The passenger cars remained intact preventing more deaths.
- September 25 – United States – On the Northern Pacific Railroad, two trains collided head-on at Young's Point (near Billings, Montana), after one of the engineers failed to yield priority to the other killing 23.
- September 26 – Germany – Gleisdreieck, Berlin: On the Hochbahn (an elevated portion of the Berlin U-Bahn), a train from Leipziger Platz (now Potsdamer Platz) station violated signals and collided with a train coming from Bülowstraße at the point where their tracks converged to go to Möckernbrücke. One car was knocked to the ground killing 21 and seriously injuring 18. Afterwards, the driver at fault was sentenced to prison and the routes were reconfigured to cross instead of converging.
- October 14 – United States – Metz, Michigan: An evacuation train operated because of forest fires derailed at a trestle bridge weakened by the flames killing 35, mostly women and children.
- India – Two passenger trains collided on a single-track section of the Oudh and Rohilkhand Railway, killing 79 people and injuring 119.
- India – An express train ran past signals and collided with a freight on the Bombay, Baroda and Central India Railway killing 26.

== 1909 ==
- January 14 – France – a train from Paris to Le Mans collided with another train. Orville and Katharine Wright were among the passengers.
- January 15 – United States – Dotsero, Colorado, near Glenwood Canyon: Two trains collided head-on on the single track due to a failure to obey train orders killing 20.
- January 22 – United Kingdom – two Lancashire and Yorkshire Railway locomotives were shunted into a siding at Hindley & Blackrod Junction, Lancashire, but one of them did not completely clear the main line. A passenger train collided with it, killing one person and injuring 33.
- February 2 – United States – Two trains on the Seaboard Railroad collided head-on on Long Cane trestle, approximately six miles (9.7 km) east of Abbeville, South Carolina, at about 10:30 pm, killing three crewmen. Reportedly, one of the engineers had his watch set wrongly by an hour.
- February 3 – United States – Powersville, Missouri: Two livestock trains on the Chicago, Milwaukee & St. Paul Railway collided head-on, killing four crewmen.
- February 4 – United States – Near University Heights in the Bronx, New York City, a group of laborers repairing tracks on the New York Central Railroad were struck by a construction train killing six injuring several others.
- February 24 – Ecuador – Riobamba: A northbound train derailed due to a track defect and dropped 100 feet (30 m) down a cliff, killing 25 people and injuring 40.
- March 5 – United Kingdom – A South Eastern and Chatham Railway passenger train overran signals at Tonbridge Junction, Kent and collided with a mail train killing two and injuring eleven.
- April 2 – United Kingdom – The locomotive of a Caledonian Railway express passenger train lost a driving wheel due to the failure of its crank axle causing the train to derailed near Crawford, Lanarkshire.
- April 21 – United Kingdom – At Cardiff, Wales, a Rhymney Railway driver returned his 0-6-2 tank engine to the shed because the injectors would not work and the pressure-gauge needle was against the maximum stop at 200 psi (1.4 MPa). He and others assumed that the gauge was reading high, since the safety valves should have opened at 145 psi (1.00 MPa), and planned to replace the gauge; but in fact the safety valves had been misassembled during a repair after the engine's last run, and the boiler pressure was well above 200 psi, which was also why the injectors did not work. The pressure continued rising until the boiler exploded and flew 45 yards (40 m) through the air, killing three.
- June 1 – Canada – The Canadian Pacific Railway's eastbound Imperial Limited express passenger train ran into an open switch at Hobon, a station west of Chapleau, Ontario on the CPR's Lake Superior Division, causing damage to the locomotive and the mail car. The body of an unauthorized and unidentified rider was found in the wreckage.
- August 19 – United Kingdom – A passenger train derailed at Friezland, Cheshire killing the crew.
- October 18 – Canada – A passenger train derailed near Ramsey on the Lake Superior Division of the Canadian Pacific Railway when it encountered a herd of cattle being driven along the railway right-of-way. Several cars were derailed causing only slight injuries to passengers.
- November 10 - Canada - In Vancouver, a BCER streetcar train collided with a flatbed track carrying lumber at Lakeview Train Station, 14 people were killed and 9 people were injured.
- November 28 – Canada – A Great Northern Railway train derailed by a washout at Sapperton, British Columbia, killing 22 people.
- December 13 – United States – The New York Central Railroad's New York Central Limited, eastbound from St. Louis, collided at North East, Pennsylvania, on the Lake Shore and Michigan Southern Railroad, with the rear of a stationary Chicago-Boston train killing at least six. Early reports incorrectly stated that the New York Central train was the 20th Century Limited.

== See also ==
- List of London Underground accidents

== Sources ==
- "Europe's history of rail disasters". BBC. October 11, 2006.
- "World's worst rail disasters". BBC. December 19, 2007.
- "GenDisasters Train Wrecks 1869–1943". Archived from the original on 2015-04-16.
- "Interstate Commerce Commission Investigations of Railroad Accidents 1911–1993". U.S. Department of Transportation. Archived from the original on 2004-10-12.
- Beebe, Lucius & Clegg, Charles (1952). Hear the train blow; a pictorial epic of America in the railroad age. New York: Grosset & Dunlap. ASIN B000I83FTC.
- Gerard, Malcolm; Hamilton, J. A. B. (1981) [1967]. Trains to Nowhere. London: George Allen & Unwin. ISBN 0-04-385084-7.
- Earnshaw, Alan (1989). Trains in Trouble: Vol. 5. Penryn: Atlantic Books. ISBN 0-906899-35-4.
- Earnshaw, Alan (1990). Trains in Trouble: Vol. 6. Penryn: Atlantic Books. ISBN 0-906899-37-0.
- Earnshaw, Alan (1991). Trains in Trouble: Vol. 7. Penryn: Atlantic Books. ISBN 0-906899-50-8.
- Earnshaw, Alan (1993). Trains in Trouble: Vol. 8. Penryn: Atlantic Books. ISBN 0-906899-52-4.
- Gould, David (2000). Maunsell's SR Steam Carriage Stock. Headington, Oxford: The Oakwood Press. ISBN 9780853615552.
- Haine, Edgar A. (1993). Railroad Wrecks. New York: Cornwall Books. ISBN 978-0-8453-4844-4.
- Hall, Stanley (1990). The Railway Detectives. London: Ian Allan. ISBN 0-7110-1929-0.
- Hoole, Ken (1982). Trains in Trouble: Vol. 3. Redruth: Atlantic Books. ISBN 0-906899-05-2.
- Hoole, Ken (1983). Trains in Trouble: Vol. 4. Truro: Atlantic Books. ISBN 0-906899-07-9.
- Karr, Ronald D. (1995). The Rail Lines of Southern New England – A Handbook of Railroad History. Branch Line Press. ISBN 978-0-942147-02-5.
- Kidner, R. W. (1977) [1963]. The South Eastern and Chatham Railway. Tarrant Hinton: The Oakwood Press.
- Kichenside, Geoffrey (1997). Great Train Disasters. Bristol: Siena Books. ISBN 0-75252-630-8.
- Leslie, Frank (January 21, 1882). Illustrated Newspaper. Vol. LIII, no. 1374. New York. p. 1.
- Moody, G. T. (1979) [1957]. Southern Electric 1909–1979 (Fifth ed.). Shepperton: Ian Allan Ltd. ISBN 0-7110-0924-4.
- Reed, Robert C. (1968). Train Wrecks – A Pictorial History of Accidents on the Main Line. New York: Bonanza Books. ISBN 978-0-517-32897-2.
- Rolt, L. T. C.; Kichenside, G. M. (1982). Red for Danger: A history of railway accidents and railway safety (4th ed.). Newton Abbot, Devon: David & Charles. ISBN 0-7153-8362-0. OCLC 9526651.
- Semmens, Peter (1994). Railway Disasters of the World: Principal Passenger Train Accidents of the 20th Century. Patrick Stephens Ltd. ISBN 1-85260-323-2.
- Shaw, Robert B. (1978). A History of Railroad Accidents, Safety Precautions and Operating Practices. LCCN 78104064.
- Smith, Peter (1978). Footplate over the Mendips. Oxford: Oxford Publishing Company. ISBN 0-86093-022-X.
- Spence, Jeoffry (1975). Victorian & Edwardian Railways from old photographs. London: Batsford. ISBN 0-7134-3044-3.
- Trevena, Arthur (1980). Trains in Trouble: Vol. 1. Redruth: Atlantic Books. ISBN 0-906899-01-X.
- Trevena, Arthur (1981). Trains in Trouble: Vol. 2. Redruth: Atlantic Books. ISBN 0-906899-03-6.
- Vaughan, Adrian (1989). Obstruction Danger. Wellingborough: Patrick Stephens Limited. ISBN 1-85260-055-1.
