= 1905 in rail transport =

This article lists events related to rail transport that occurred in 1905.

== Events ==
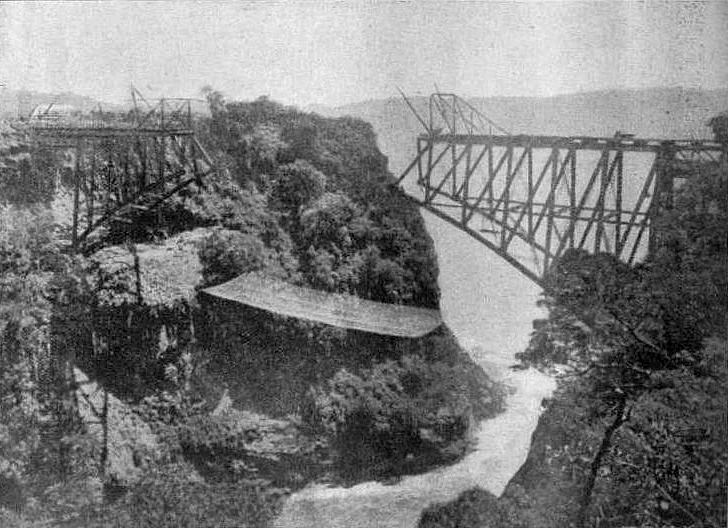
Victoria Falls Bridge nears completion

=== January events ===
- January 30 - The Halifax and South Western Railway opens, connecting Halifax to Yarmouth, Nova Scotia.
- January 31 - New York Central and Hudson River Railroad officially takes control of Ottawa and New York Railway.

=== March events ===
- March 21 - Construction begins on the Apalachicola Northern Railroad in Florida.

=== April events ===
- April - Ralph Peters becomes president of the Long Island Rail Road
- April 1 - Nippon Railroad Line, Nippori of Tokyo via Taira Station to Iwanuma of Miyagi Prefecture route officially completed in Japan.(as predecessor of Joban Line)
- April 26 - The San Pedro, Los Angeles and Salt Lake Railroad (which later became part of Union Pacific) signs an agreement to operate over the California Southern Railroad's track through Cajon Pass via trackage rights.

=== June events ===
- June 11 - The Pennsylvania Railroad inaugurates the fastest freight train schedule in the world, operating between Chicago, Illinois, and New York City in 18 hours.
- June 12 - Pennsylvania Railroad's passenger train Pennsylvania Special (which would later become the Broadway Limited) sets a speed record between Chicago and New York City, travelling at 127.2 mph (204.7 km/h).
- June 21 - The New York Central Railroad's flagship passenger train, the 20th Century Limited, is derailed in an apparent act of sabotage in Mentor, Ohio, killing 21.

=== July events ===
- July 1 - The three principal railway companies in Italy are brought together with a number of private operators into the nationalised Ferrovie dello Stato.
- July 8 - Death Valley Scotty pays US$5,500 in cash to Atchison, Topeka and Santa Fe Railway general passenger agent J. J. Byrne to charter the Scott Special.
- July 9 - The Scott Special, an Atchison, Topeka & Santa Fe Railway passenger train chartered by Death Valley Scotty for US$5,500, departs Los Angeles, on its record breaking run to Chicago, in just under 45 hours.
- July 11 - The Scott Special arrives at Dearborn Station in Chicago, 44 hours and 54 minutes after departing Los Angeles.
- July 27 - The Hall Road rail accident near Liverpool in England kills 21 people.

=== August events ===
- August 9 - Heath Park Halt, the terminus for passenger services on the Nickey line in England, opens.
- August 22 - The Portland and Seattle Railway is incorporated.

=== September events ===
- September 1 - The Witham rail crash in England kills 11.
- September 9 - Construction begins on the Nevada Northern Railway in Ely, Nevada.
- September 12 - Opening of the Victoria Falls Bridge across the Zambezi River as part of the projected Cape-Cairo railway.

=== October events ===
- October 15 - Rail line completed in the Sudan from Atbara to the Red Sea at Suakin; also, the Syria Ottoman Railway's Jezreel Valley railway completing a through rail link between Haifa and Damascus.
- October 29 (October 16 Old Style) - Circum-Baikal Railway brought into permanent operation in the Russian Empire, completing through rail communication on the Trans-Siberian Railway.
- October 31 - Bombay, Baroda & Central India Railway property purchased by Government of India.

=== November events ===
- November 3 - The Englewood branch of the old South Side Elevated system of the Chicago 'L' opens between 59th Street junction and State Street.

=== Unknown date events ===
- Construction begins on the Tidewater Railway in Virginia.
- Indian Railways Board set up.
- ALCO purchases rival steam locomotive manufacturer Rogers Locomotive & Machine Works.
- American Car & Foundry acquires Indianapolis Car and Foundry and Indianapolis Car Company.

== Births ==
=== January births ===
- January 17 - Louis Armand, French railway engineer, manager and resistance fighter (died 1971).
- January 21 - Oswald Nock, English railway author and signalling engineer (died 1994).

== Deaths ==
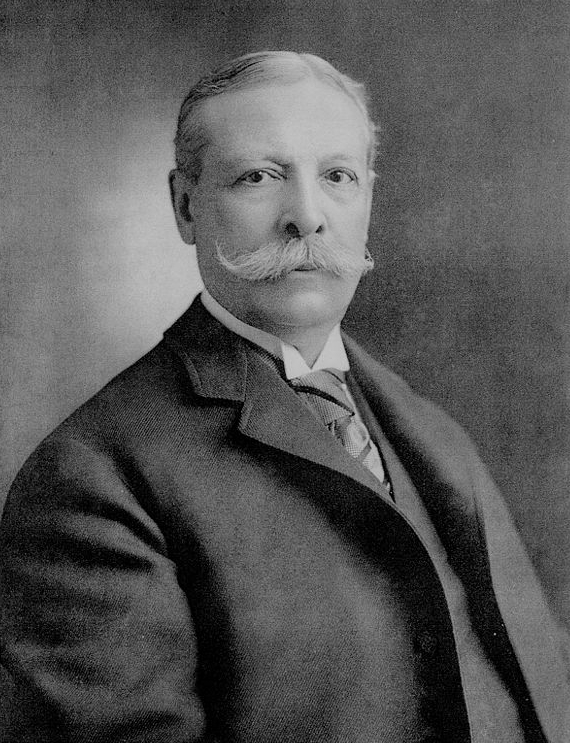
Charles Tyson Yerkes

=== February deaths ===
- February 8 - Jay Cooke, American financier who built the Northern Pacific Railway (born 1821).

=== September deaths ===
- September 4 - William Dean, Chief Mechanical Engineer of Great Western Railway of England 1877-1902 (born 1840).

=== December deaths ===
- December 14 - Herman Haupt, American railroad civil engineer (born 1817).
- December 29 - Charles Tyson Yerkes, American financier of rapid transit systems in Chicago and London (born 1837).
