= Camp Creek =

Camp Creek may refer to:

== Australia ==
- Camp Creek, Queensland, a locality in the Cassowary Coast Region

== United States ==
There are over one thousand places in the United States named Camp Creek, including several hundred streams:

=== Streams ===
- Camp Creek (El Dorado County, California)
- Camp Creek (Tuolumne County, California)
- Camp Creek (Fulton County, Georgia)
- Camp Creek (Gwinnett County, Georgia)
- Camp Creek (Clayton County, Georgia)
- Camp Creek (Henry County, Georgia), site of the 1900 Camp Creek train wreck.
- Camp Creek (Union County, Georgia)
- Camp Creek (Iowa)
- Camp Creek (Root River), a stream in Fillmore County, Minnesota
- Camp Creek (Cuivre River), a stream in Missouri
- Camp Creek (Salt River), a stream in Missouri
- Camp Creek (Wolf Creek), a stream in Missouri
- Camp Creek (Eagle Creek tributary), a stream in Holt County, Nebraska
- Camp Creek (Sandy River), on the western side of Mount Hood in Oregon
- Camp Creek (South Carolina)
- Camp Creek (Johnson County, Texas)
- Camp Creek (Virginia)

=== Other places ===
- Camp Creek State Park, in rural Mercer County, West Virginia
- Camp Creek, Tennessee, an unincorporated community in Greene County, Tennessee
- Camp Creek Lake, Robertson County, Texas
