= Mentor station =

Railway station in Mentor, Ohio, United States

Mentor
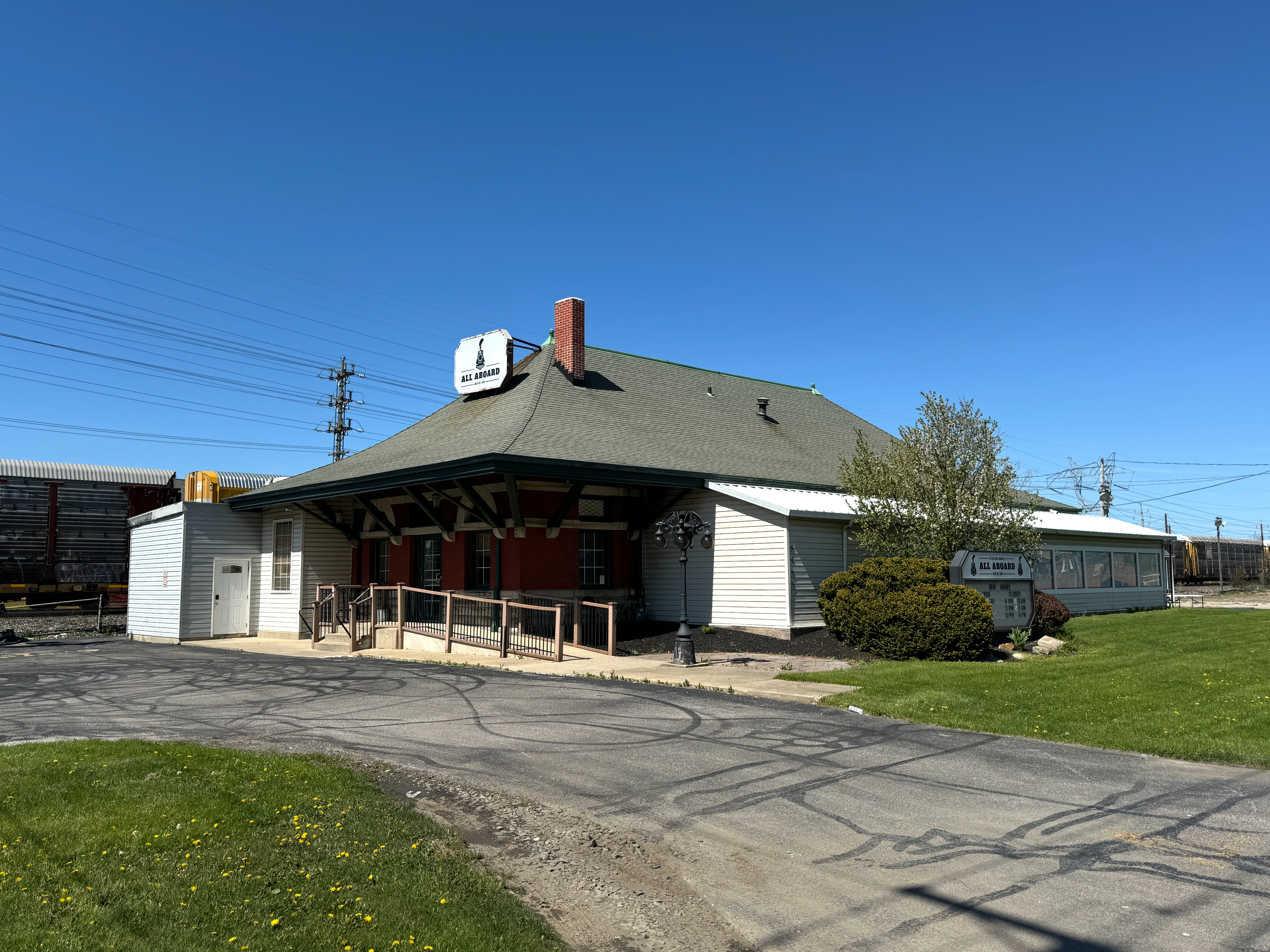
- Station building in April 2024

General information
- Location: 8445 Station Street; Mentor, Ohio 44060
- Coordinates: 41.6789°N 81.3383°W
- Owner: Lake Shore & Michigan Southern Railway (1890 – 1914); New York Central (1914 – 19??)
- Tracks: 2

Construction
- Architectural style: Vernacular

Other information
- Website: http://www.deekerssidetracks.com

History
- Opened: c. 1870-1874
- Closed: 1948
- Rebuilt: 1890

Former services
Preceding station	New York Central Railroad	Following station
Reynolds toward Chicago	Main Line	Heisley toward New York
- Lake Shore and Michigan Southern RR Depot and Freight House
- U.S. National Register of Historic Places
- Area: Less than 1 acre (0.4 ha)
- NRHP reference No.: 78002092
- Added to NRHP: January 31, 1978
Location
- Location within Ohio Location within the United States

Mentor is a former railroad depot located on Station Street in Mentor, Ohio. The station opened in 1890. A defunct New York Central freight house is located across the tracks from the depot. The depot is currently open and used by a restaurant. Mentor station is on the National Register of Historic Places as the Lake Shore and Michigan Southern RR Depot and Freight House.

== History ==
The passenger depot was opened in 1890 by the Lake Shore and Michigan Southern Railway, replacing an older depot on the same line. The station was acquired by the New York Central Railroad after merging with the LS&MS in 1914. Passenger service to Mentor ended in summer 1948. A variety of restaurants has been located in the old depot since then, including Gatsby's, Deeker's, and All Aboard.

=== Train derailment ===
On June 21, 1905, at 9:05pm, an eastbound LS&MS-operated 20th Century Limited train hit an open switch near the depot. The resulting crash destroyed the old freight depot, and caused the deaths of 21 people on the train.

Following the destruction of the LS&MS freight depot, a new freight house was built in 1909.

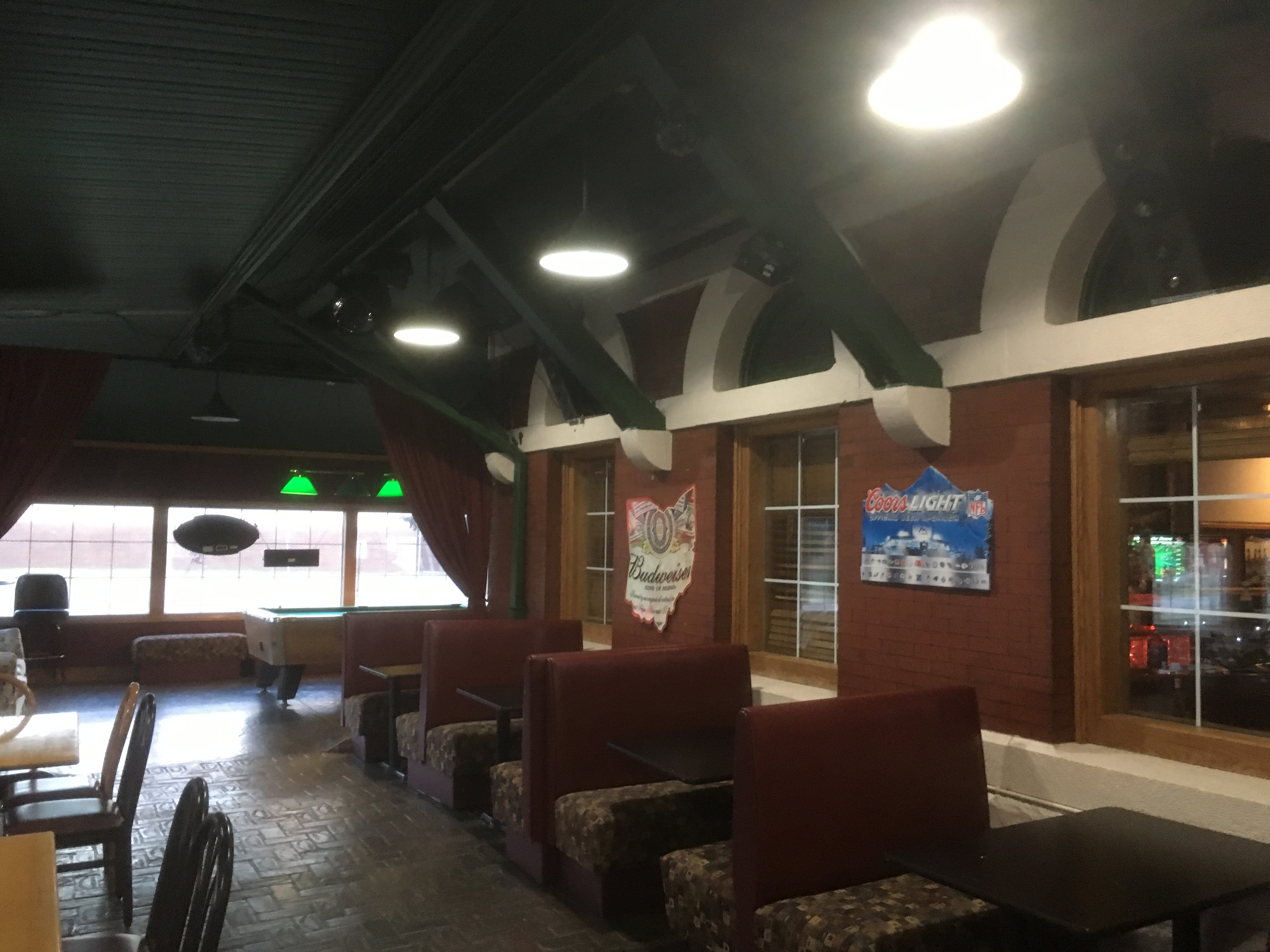
Inside the restaurant. Note the east side of the Depot is now indoors.

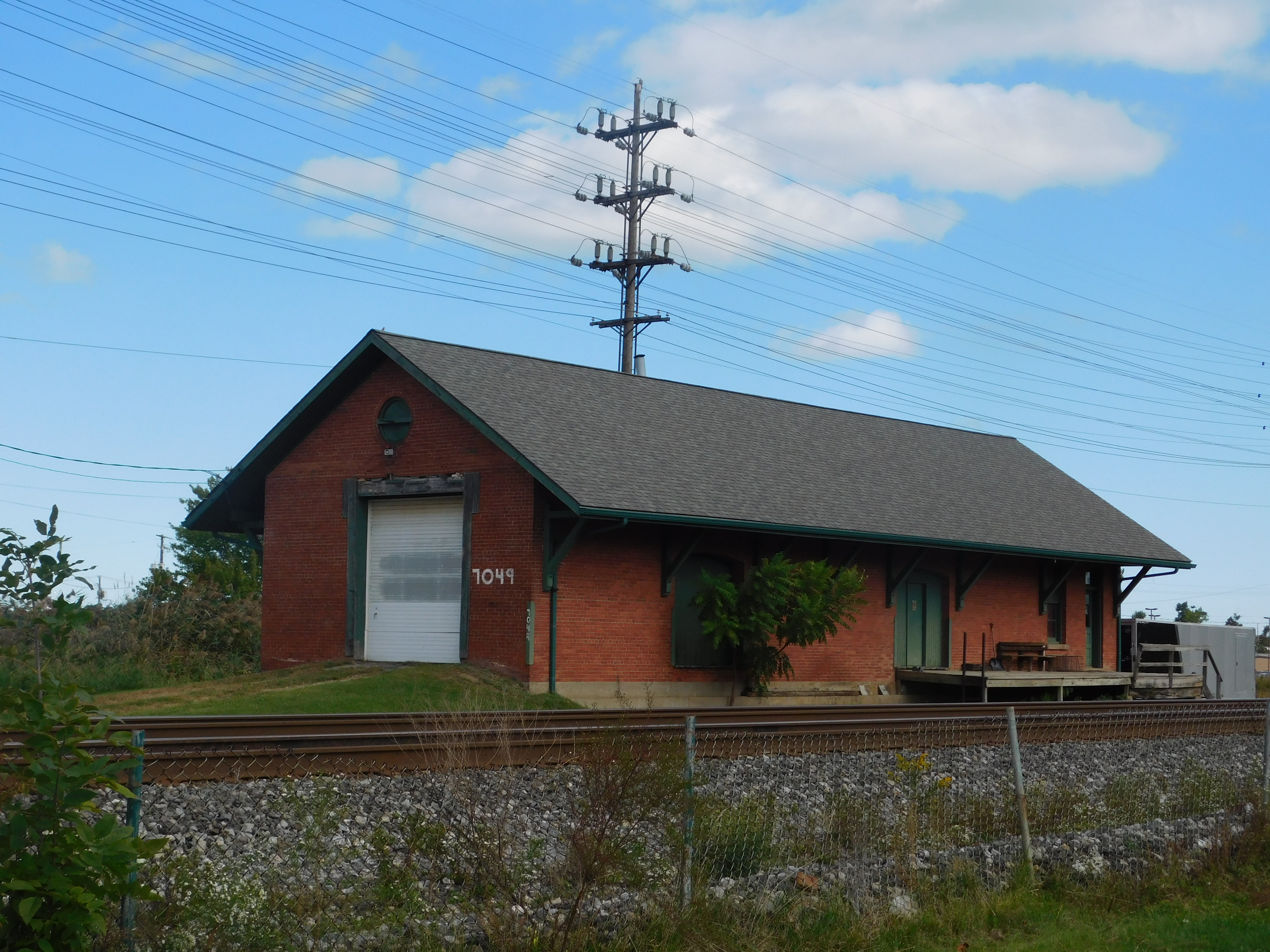
The adjacent freight house, built in 1909 to replace the one destroyed in the 1905 wreck of the 20th Century Limited.
