= Beck Mountain =

Summit in the US state of Missouri

Coordinates: 37°44′35″N 90°24′39″W

Beck Mountain is a summit in St. Francois County in the U.S. state of Missouri. The peak is at an elevation of 1,050 feet (320 m).

The peak lies southeast of Farmington and the St. Francis River flows past its southwest side. Rickus Hill lies to the southeast.

Beck Mountain has the name of Andrew Beck, a pioneer citizen.
