= Camp Township, Polk County, Iowa =

Township in Polk County, Iowa, U.S.

Coordinates: 41.5467°N 93.3818°W

Camp Township is a township in Polk County, Iowa, United States.

It is home to the town of Runnells, Iowa, United States. It is also home to the unincorporated community of Adelphi.

== History ==
Camp Township took its name from Camp Creek.
