= 20th Century Limited derailment =

Railway accident caused by sabotage

Coordinates: 41°40′44.6″N 81°20′17.9″W

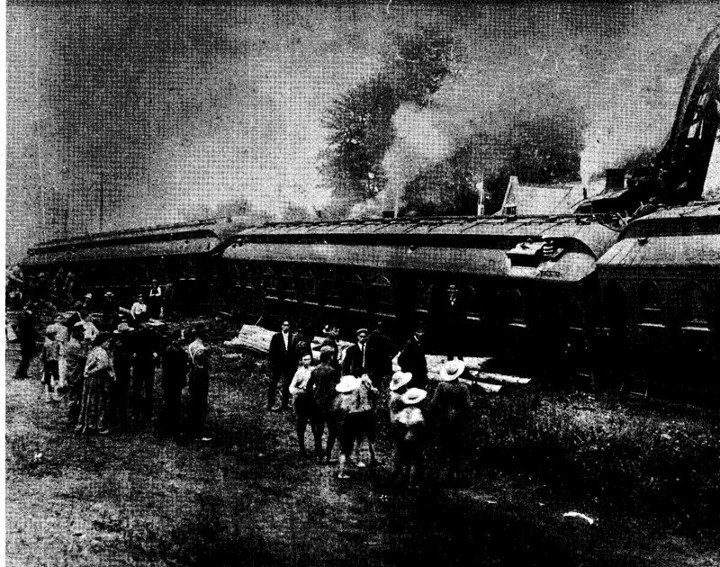
- Onlookers standing amongst the wreckage of the 20th Century Limited. Mentor station is visible behind the middle car.

Details
- Date: Wednesday, June 21, 1905; 121 years ago 9:20 p.m. EDT (UTC−4)
- Location: Mentor, Ohio
- Country: United States
- Line: Lake Shore and Michigan Southern Railway
- Operator: New York Central Railroad
- Service: Passenger
- Incident type: Derailment
- Cause: Unknown, possible sabotage

Statistics
- Trains: 1
- Passengers: 67
- Deaths: 21
- Injured: Greater than 25
- Damage: LS&MS freight depot destroyed

On the night of Wednesday, June 21, 1905, the New York Central Railroad's flagship passenger train, the 20th Century Limited between Chicago and New York City, derailed in Mentor, Ohio, on the Lake Shore and Michigan Southern Railway line, killing 21 passengers and injuring more than 25 others on board. A switch from the mainline to a freight siding was open, causing the Limited to leave the mainline and overrun the siding at high speed. The cause of the accident was never officially determined, but overwhelming evidence points to an act of rail sabotage. The 20th Century Limited, which ran between New York City and Chicago, had just weeks earlier been reduced from a 20 hour trip to 18 hours.

== Incident ==
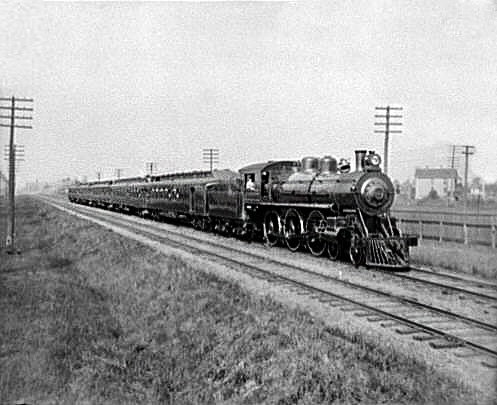
The 20th Century Limited running on the Boston and Albany Railroad sometime in the early 1900s. Similar to the train involved in the crash.

On June 21, 1905, Train No. 26, the 20th Century Limited, was approaching the town of Mentor from the west, running on a mainline owned by the Lake Shore and Michigan Southern Railway. Conflicting reports exist as to whether the train was running behind schedule, but it was crowded, with 67 passengers on board. At 9:20 p.m. (EDT), the engine lurched to the left as it entered a freight depot siding at a speed of about 70 mph (110 km/h). The high speed of the consist mixed with the short length of the siding allowed no time to prevent the accident. The engine canted over onto its left side, ejecting fireman Aaron Gorham from his position and fatally crushing the engineer at the throttle. The engine plowed through a Lake Shore and Michigan Southern Railway freight depot, and its boiler exploded. A Chicago sleeping car immediately behind the locomotive telescoped into the tender, and caught fire in the resulting explosion. The second car, a combination car, landed atop the carnage and was destroyed. The third car, another sleeper, left the track. No other cars derailed in the crash.

Rescuers responded almost immediately, but the heat from the fire prevented close approach. The ensuing fire burned for four or five hours, not being contained until midnight (EDT) on June 22. Physicians came from as far as Cleveland and as nearby as Painesville to offer aid. Ultimately, 21 passengers were killed in the wreck or the fire, most burned beyond recognition. Five were seriously injured, and "more than a score" were less seriously injured. Some of the injured were placed aboard a relief train that took them to Cleveland, and others placed in ambulances that rushed to nearby hospitals. The last body was pulled from the wreckage at about 1 a.m. on June 22. One of those killed was C.H. Wellman, who had a friend in Mentor by the name of Horace Andrews, the president of the Cleveland Electric Railway Company. Andrews was summoned to the accident site, just in time to receive a final message from Wellman for his wife.

== Investigation ==
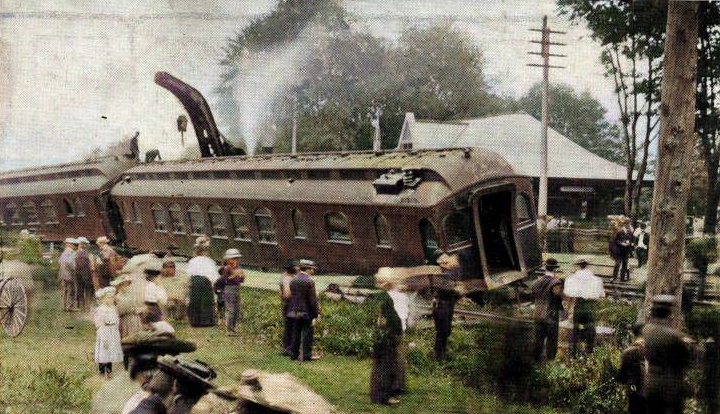
Colorized photograph of the scene; likely taken after June 21, due to a car being removed.

The media speculated that the train had been running at an unsafe speed, but investigation indicated otherwise. It was found that 50 minutes before the Limited had arrived in Mentor, Train No. 10 from Chicago to Boston had passed through the switch without fault, and no other trains had since come through. Alex Hammond, the conductor of the Limited, inspected the switch shortly after the disaster, and found that it was set and locked for the sidetrack. Also, a white light showing the positioning of the track was found to be in the "clear" position, which was supposed to indicate that the points were set for the mainline. With this evidence, the New York Central Railroad insisted that the accident was the result of willful misplacement of the switch by an unknown party. After an investigation, Assistant General Superintendent D.C. Moon of the Lake Shore and Michigan Southern issued a statement that corroborated this belief, stating that he was "satisfied that somebody, with a key, opened the switch with malicious intent. The train did not jump the track." Despite efforts, no party was ever found at fault and to this day, the official cause of the accident is undetermined.

== Aftermath ==
The Lake Shore and Michigan Southern Railway rebuilt its freight depot in 1909; it exists today. Directly opposite the freight depot, the former Mentor railroad station at the corner of Station and Hart Streets, became New York Central property when it merged with the LS&MS in 1914. Passenger service to Mentor ended in 1949, and as of 2024 the station was occupied by All Aboard, a bar and grille.

== See also ==
- 1939 City of San Francisco derailment
- 1995 Palo Verde, Arizona derailment
- 1905 in rail transport
- Lists of rail accidents
- List of rail accidents (1900–1909)
- List of unsolved murders (1900–1979)
