= Rickus Hill =

Summit in the US state of Missouri

Coordinates: 37°44′05″N 90°23′00″W

Rickus Hill is a summit in St. Francois County in the U.S. state of Missouri. It has an elevation of 1,079 feet (329 m). The peak lies about three miles southeast of Farmington. Wolf Creek flows past the north side of the peak and joins the St. Francis River to the east of the peak.

Rickus Hill has the name of Frederick Rickus, the original owner of the site.
