= Camp Creek (Wolf Creek tributary) =

Stream in the U.S. state of Missouri

Coordinates: 37°47′32″N 90°22′18″W

Camp Creek is a stream in St. Francis county in southeast Missouri. It is a tributary of Wolf Creek.

The stream headwaters are just east of the community of Ogborn at and it flows southeast passing under Missouri Route EE northeast of Farmington to its confluence with Taylor Branch just north of Missouri Route 32 at . Wolf Creek begins at the confluence of Camp Creek and Taylor Branch.

Camp Creek, historically known as "Camp Branch", most likely was so named on account of a campground near its course.

== See also ==
- List of rivers of Missouri
