= Barberton rail crash =

Train wreck near Barberton, South Africa

Details
- Date: March 30, 1902
- Location: near Barberton, South Africa
- Coordinates: 25.723333°S 31.052222°E
- Country: South Africa
- Incident type: Derailment
- Cause: Excessive speed

Statistics
- Trains: 1
- Vehicles: 7
- Deaths: 44
- Injured: 39

The Barberton rail crash was a train derailment that occurred near Barberton, South Africa in 1902.

== Background ==
At the time of the incident, the Second Boer War was near the end of the conflict (with the war itself ending around two months after the accident). The 2nd Hampshire Regiment was ordered to move from their post in Barberton, to Johannesburg on March 24, 1902. The train consisted of seven cars; while mostly being used to transport the military regiment, it was also being used for civilian transport.

== Accident ==
On 8:00 a.m. March 30, 1902, Easter Sunday, the train had departed from a station in Barberton. The train had left without delay, but soon gained excess speed while traveling down an incline. By the time the train had sped to 80 mph (148 kph), it began to lose control. The cars began to violently shake causing many of the occupants to lose their footing. Knowing a crash was imminent, the soldiers were ordered to lay down on the floor. One of the soldiers who disobeyed orders leapt from the train instead and perished.

The train reached a curve at the bottom of the incline that proved to be too much for it to handle. Every vehicle of the train derailed. The train continued to slide down a gully, but this resulted in the boiler of the train exploding. The cars of the train shattered and splintered. One of the cars, a 'boy' truck, landed on its side and had its door sealed shut as a result of the impact. Survivors would describe the scene as quiet as if they were anticipating death, but also silent in anticipation of further military orders.

44 passengers died as a result of the accident and approximately 40 others were injured.

== Aftermath ==
The 44 who were killed in the accident were buried the day after the crash in Barberton Cemetery. They were given full military honors. A memorial was erected in the cemetery with a wall listing the names of all of those who perished in the disaster.
