= Wolf Creek (St. Francis River tributary) =

Stream in the U.S. state of Missouri

Wolf Creek is a stream in eastern St. Francois County in the U.S. state of Missouri. It is a tributary of the St. Francis River.

The stream headwaters arise just northeast of Farmington at 37°47′32″N 90°22′19″W at the confluence of Camp Creek and Taylor Branch. The stream flows south passing under Missouri Route 32. It flows southwest to its confluence with the St. Francis at 37°43′39″N 90°24′21″W at an elevation of 814 feet (248 m).

Wolf Creek was so named due to the presence of wolves in the area.

== See also ==
- List of rivers of Missouri
