= Camp Creek (Iowa) =

Stream in Iowa, United States

Coordinates: 41°29′33″N 93°19′46″W

Camp Creek is a stream in Polk, Marion and Jasper counties, in the U.S. state of Iowa.

Camp Creek was named from the fact a first settler camped there before deciding to stay.

== See also ==
- List of rivers of Iowa
