= Hall Road rail accident =

1905 railway accident in the UK

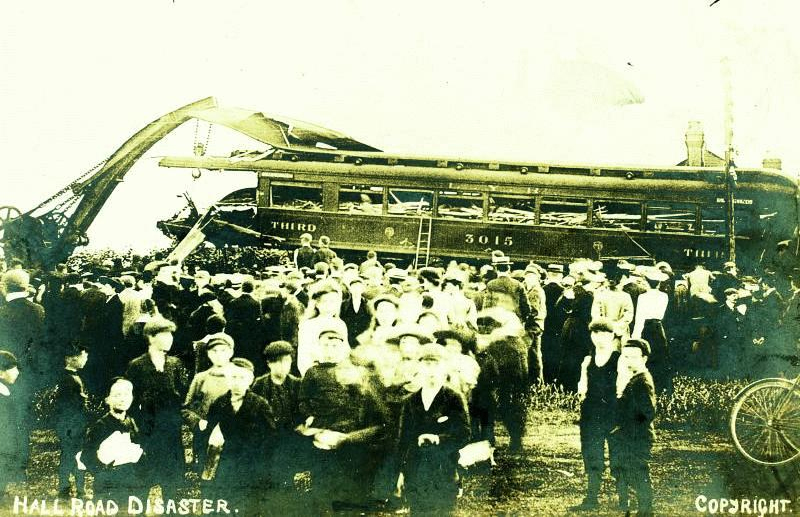

Details
- Date: 27 July 1905; 16:37
- Location: Hall Road railway station
- Coordinates: 53.4975°N 3.0497°W
- Country: England
- Line: Lancashire and Yorkshire Railway
- Cause: Rear-end collision due to points failure.

Statistics
- Trains: 2
- Deaths: 20
- Injured: 48

The Hall Road rail accident occurred at 16:37 on 27 July 1905 at Hall Road station between Bootle and Formby north of Liverpool, operated at the time by the Lancashire and Yorkshire Railway. The 16:30 Liverpool Exchange to Southport express collided with a local train which had departed Liverpool ten minutes earlier, and which was to be turned round at Hall Road. The empty local train had been shunted into a siding to allow the express to pass; according to the official report, the points failed to close properly and the signalman was unable to clear the signal for the express. He then worked the points back and forth three times and, unable to clear the signal, waved a green flag to the driver. He had left the points set for the siding and the express was diverted into it and struck the rear of the local train, killing 20 people in the front coach of the express after telescoping occurred. Both drivers survived, having jumped clear prior to the impact.

== Sources ==
- Disasters in and around the Crosby, Waterloo and Nth Liverpool area
