= Camp Creek train wreck =

1900 railroad accident in Georgia, U.S.

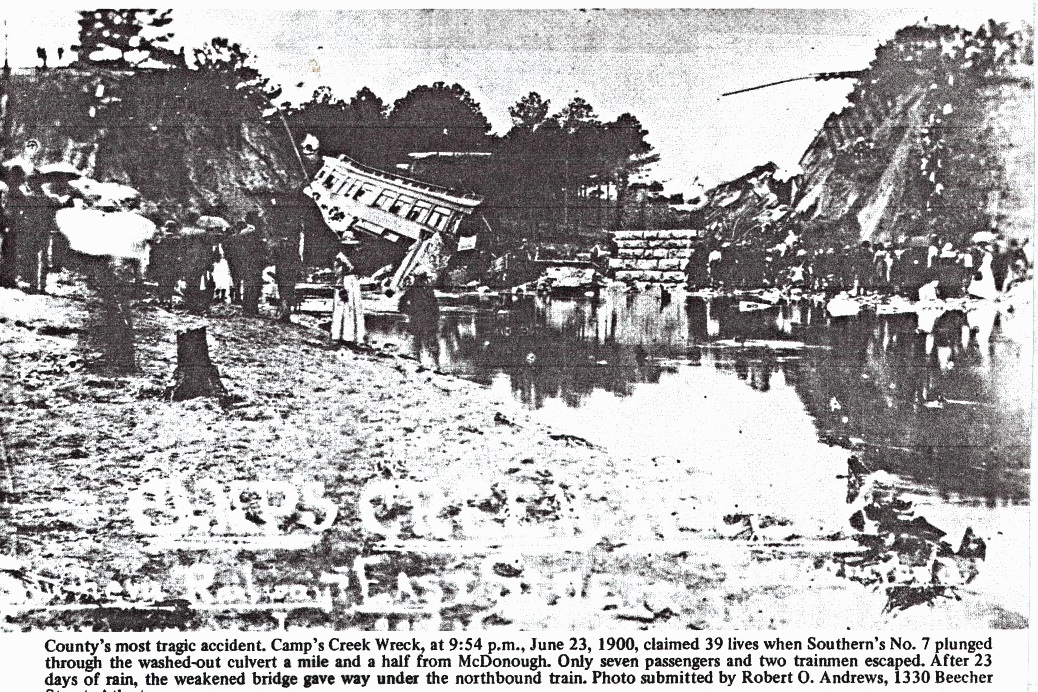
- Camp Creek train wreck of 1900

Details
- Date: June 23, 1900; Around 9:45pm (21:45)
- Location: Just outside McDonough, Georgia
- Coordinates: 33°27′47.7″N 84°09′28.7″W
- Country: United States
- Line: Southern Railway (northbound)
- Operator: Southern Railway
- Cause: Washout of trestle bridge due to heavy rain.

Statistics
- Trains: 1
- Passengers: 45
- Deaths: 37 or 35 (Note: Different news articles that were published after the crash and fire used 35 and 37 respectively. This may be due to those who were unidentified, and perhaps a lack of communication due to the technology at the time and the accounts of those who survived.)
- Injured: 10

The Camp Creek train wreck was a railroad disaster that took place on 23 June 1900 just outside McDonough, Georgia. The northbound Southern Railway train hit a washout 1.5 miles north of the town, plunging 60 feet into the swollen creek below before bursting into flames, killing 35 of the 45 aboard the train.

== Events preceding the wreck ==
The train, consisting of Southern engine No. 7 with two coaches and a Pullman sleeper car attached, departed Macon, Georgia, at 7:10 pm with railroad engineer J.T. Sullivan at the controls. Sullivan was not supposed to be the engineer that night, but the scheduled engineer's daughter had come down with pneumonia. Sullivan agreed to fill in for his fellow engineer. The train arrived in McDonough on time, where it usually would be coupled with a connecting train from Columbus, Georgia, which would then in turn be hauled north to Atlanta. However, by no small miracle for those on board, the train from Columbus did not arrive on time, and No. 7 departed north towards Atlanta without its usual load of passengers. It was raining heavily and some passengers were nervous about travelling in such adverse weather. When Sullivan was told of this he remarked, "We'll either be having breakfast in Atlanta or Hell." He received orders to leave McDonough and head north at around 9:45 pm.

== The wreck ==
Shortly after leaving McDonough, No. 7 came upon the Camp Creek trestle. The trestle's brick supports had been washed away by the raging waters of the creek, which had been fed by more than two weeks of continuous rain. The engineer saw this and applied the brakes, but it was too late. The bridge collapsed under the weight of the train, sending No. 7 crashing into the rushing water. Shortly after hitting the water, the locomotive burst into flames, followed by the two coaches. Only the Pullman car remained unburned. All 10 of the survivors were in the Pullman car at the time of the crash, as there were no survivors from the locomotive and first two cars, which had splintered upon impact.

The flagman, J.J. Quinlan, was the first of the survivors to successfully scale the muddy embankment, and quickly procured a length of rope that was then used to save two women from Boston. He then ran into town to alert the local telegraph operator before passing out on the floor of the telegraph office.

== Response and aftermath ==
The entire male population of McDonough was quickly mobilized shortly after Quinlan delivered the news of the wreck. However, they were unable to assist those who may have still been alive in the cars because of the flames. Word was sent out to Atlanta of the crash, and a train with doctors and ministers arrived the next morning.

The bodies of the dead were not able to be recovered until the next morning when the flames died out. Many of the dead were disfiguringly crushed and charred, and identification was dependent on the documents in their pockets. The bodies of those without identifying documents were laid out in the McDonough town square for families to come and identify their loved ones. Some claim this has resulted in the square being haunted.

== List of the dead ==
WILLIAM A. BARCLAY, Conductor, Atlanta.

J. E. WOOD, Conductor, Atlanta.

J. A. HUNNICUT, Conductor, Atlanta.

J. T. SULLIVAN, Engineer.

W. W. BENNETT, baggage master, Atlanta.

T. E. MADDOX, cotton buyer, Atlanta.

W. J. PATE, Atlanta.

12-year-old son of W. J. Pate, Atlanta.

H. R. CRESSINAS, Pullman conductor.

GEORGE W. FLOURNOY, Atlanta.

D. C. HIGHTOWER, Stockbridge, Ga.

W. W. SPARK, Macon, Ga.

ELDER HENSON, traveling man, believed to be of Florida.

J. R. FLORIDA, Nashville, Tenn.

W. O. ELLIS, bridgeman, Stockbridge.

D. Y. GRIFFITH, supervisor.

J. H. RHODE, flagman.

JOHN BRANTLEY, white.

WILL GREEN, extra fireman.

W. L. MORRISETT, pump repairer.

W. R. LAWRENCE, foreman extra gang.

ED. BYRD, colored fireman, Atlanta.

ROBERT SPENCER, train porter.

Four Bodies Unidentified.

Eight Negro Section Hands.

== List of survivors ==
JESSE L. ROHR of Baltimore.

WALTER POPE of Atlanta.

J. C. FLYNN of Atlanta.

MISS MARY B. MERRITT, of Boston, Mass.

MISS CLARA ALDEN, of Boston, Mass.

E. SCHRINER, of Chattanooga, Tenn.

E. T. MACK, of Chattanooga, Tenn.

J. J. QUINLAN, flagman.

T. C. CARTER, Pullman porter.

HANDY TOMLINSON
