= Witham rail crash =

1905 railway incident in Essex, England

Coordinates: 51.8047°N 0.63736°E

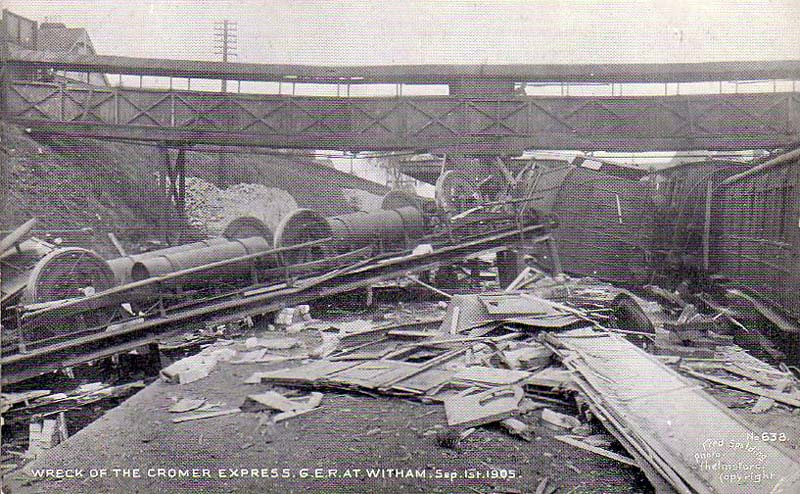
- The scene after the accident

Details
- Date: 1 September 1905
- Location: Witham railway station
- Country: England
- Line: Great Eastern Main Line
- Operator: Great Eastern Railway
- Cause: Points maintenance error

Statistics
- Trains: 1
- Deaths: 11
- Injured: 71

Witham railway station was the scene of a serious accident on Friday, 1 September 1905.

== Derailment ==
All 14 coaches of the 09:27 London Liverpool Street-to-Cromer express derailed whilst travelling through the station at speed. Ten passengers and a luggage porter were killed when several of the carriages somersaulted on to the platforms causing considerable damage to the rolling stock and the station. Seventy-one passengers were seriously injured. This remains to this day the worst single loss of life in a railway accident in Essex.

== Enquiry ==
The subsequent enquiry found that the derailment occurred at a trailing crossover which was being worked on by three platelayers. The three maintained they had just been clearing and repacking the ballast which would not have impaired the stability of the track; and the only contributing cause was the high speed of the train.

== Witness ==
However six weeks later a further witness was found, a shunter who was waiting for the express to pass before reporting to the signal box, who stated he saw that 'a key was out of the rail' and saw the rail jump up as the locomotives passed the crossover and the leading coach plough into the ballast. When the enquiry was reopened the three platelayers stuck to their original story. But when the driver and fireman of the express were recalled they recounted that as their train approached Witham the three men were working furiously on the track ahead; so furiously that the driver feared they would not move out of the way in time; and that all three had their eyes riveted to a certain point of the track. The guard had also previously stated that his van seemed to have jolted and hit something hard as it had passed over the crossing and had then derailed.

== Final conclusions ==
The reconvened enquiry therefore found that the platelayers had rashly loosened the rail fastening and had been unable to make good their mistake in time.

== Sources ==
- Rolt, L.T.C.; Kichenside, Geoffrey (1982) [1955]. Red for Danger (4th ed.). Newton Abbot: David & Charles. pp. 130–133. ISBN 0-7153-8362-0.
