= 20th Century Limited =

American named passenger train (1902–1967)

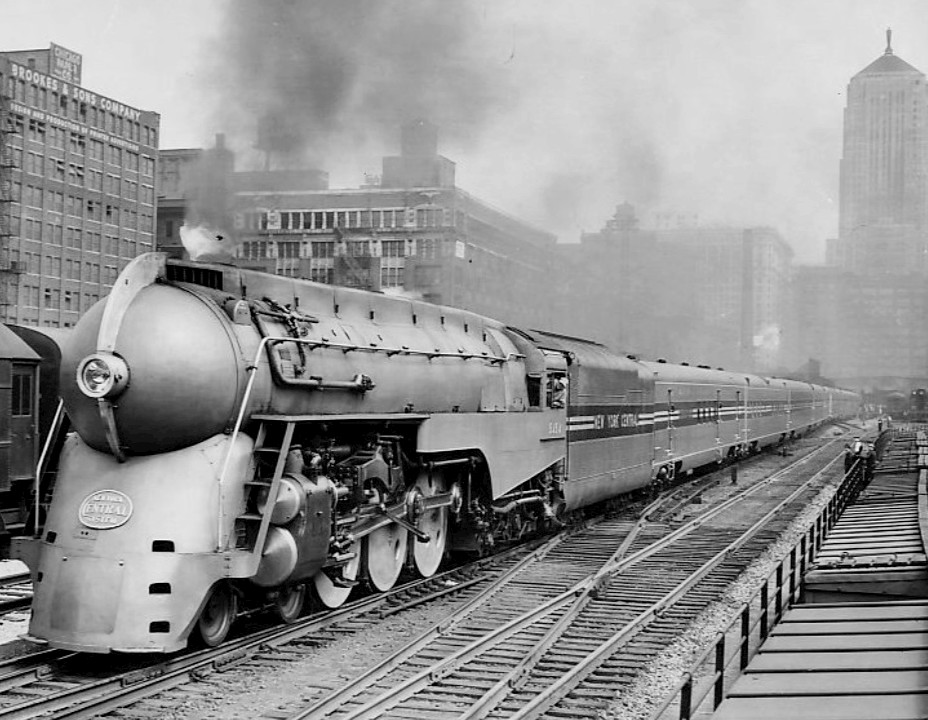
- The streamlined 20th Century Limited departing Chicago on a trial run in June 1938

Overview
- Status: Ceased
- First service: June 15, 1902
- Last service: December 2, 1967
- Successor: Lake Shore Limited
- Former operator: New York Central Railroad

Route
- Termini: New York; Chicago
- Service frequency: Daily

The 20th Century Limited was an express passenger train on the New York Central Railroad (NYC) from 1902 to 1967. The train traveled between Grand Central Terminal in New York City and LaSalle Street Station in Chicago, Illinois, along the railroad's "Water Level Route".

NYC inaugurated the 20th Century Limited as competition to the Pennsylvania Railroad, aimed at upper-class and business travelers. It made few station stops along the way and used track pans to take water at speed. On June 15, 1938, streamlined train sets designed by Henry Dreyfuss were added to the route.

Widely considered to be one of the greatest American passenger trains of all time, the 20th Century Limited was the flagship train of the New York Central and was advertised as "The Most Famous Train in the World". It was described in The New York Times as having been "[...] known to railroad buffs for 65 years as the world's greatest train", and its style was described as "spectacularly understated". The phrase "red-carpet treatment" is derived from passengers' walking to the train on a specially designed crimson carpet.

== History ==
=== Early history ===
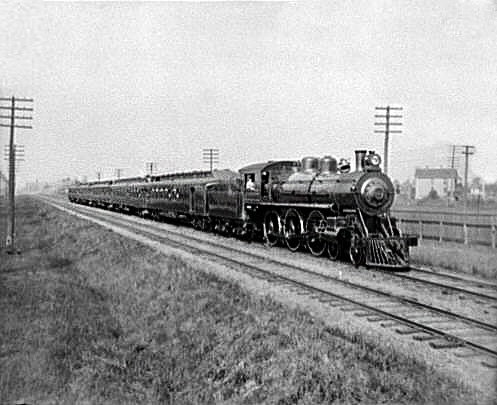
The 20th Century Limited in the early 1900s

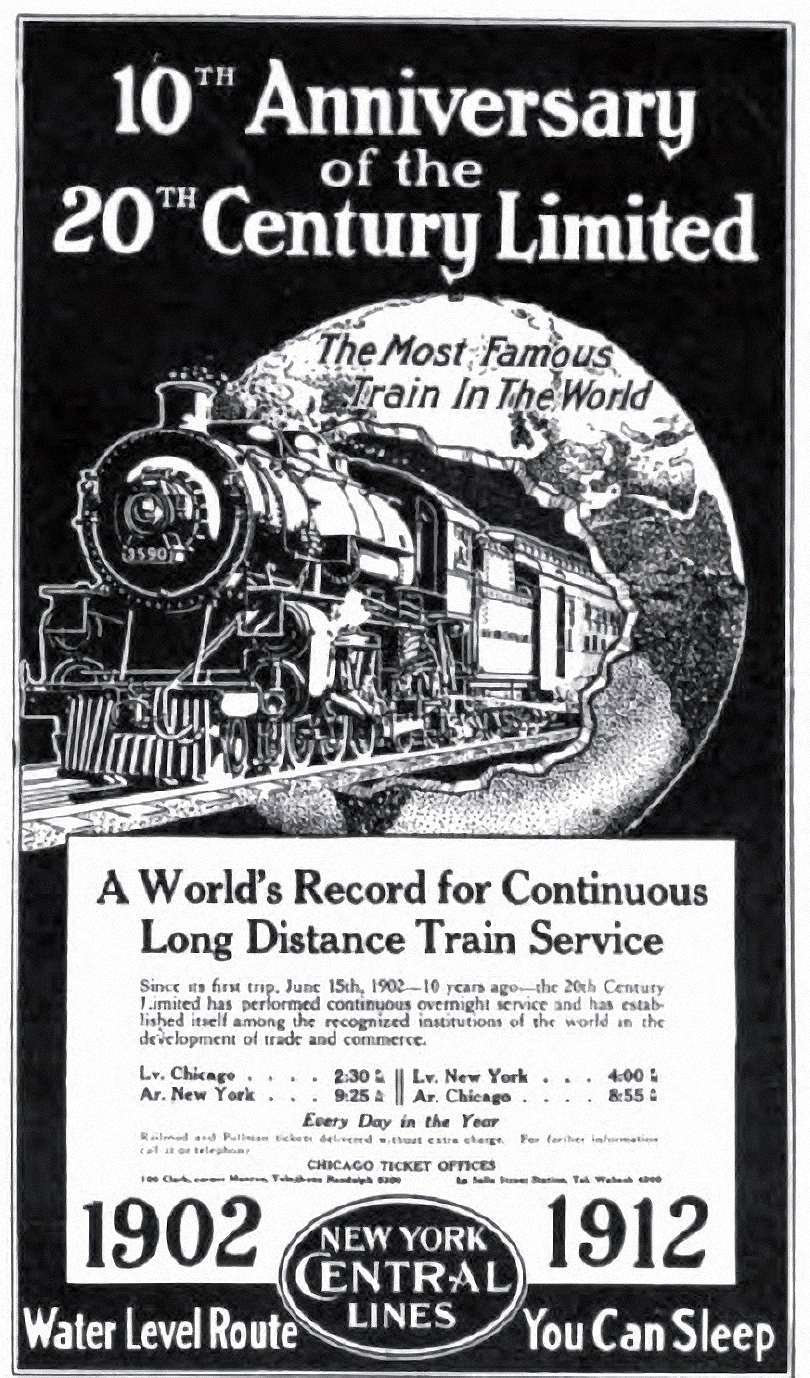
"The Most Famous Train in the World" (1912 New York Central ad)

The 20th Century Limited first ran on June 15, 1902. It completed its run from New York to Chicago in 20 hours, four hours less than previous trains, and arrived three minutes ahead of schedule. It offered a barbershop and secretarial services. The New York Times' report stressed the routine nature of the trip, with no special procedures being followed and no extra efforts being made to break records. It said that there "was no excitement along the way," and quoted a railroad official's claim: "it is a perfectly practical run and will be continued." Engineer William Gates said, "This schedule can be made without any difficulty. I can do it every time, barring accidents".

The schedule cut two more hours off the run in June 1905, and, on the 21st of that month, the train was intentionally derailed on the Lake Shore & Michigan Southern Railway line at Mentor, Ohio, killing 21 passengers. It reverted to 20 hours in 1912 and was unchanged until 1932. In 1935, it dropped to 16 hours and 30 minutes.

The engine change point was moved to Croton–Harmon station in 1913, when the NYC line was electrified south of that point.

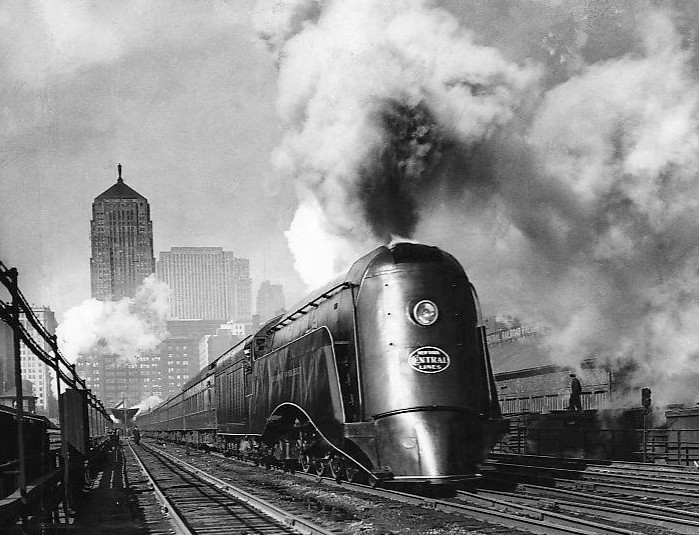
The 20th Century Limited pulled by Hudson #5344 Commodore Vanderbilt departing LaSalle Street Station, 1935

In the 1920s, the New York-Chicago fare was $32.70 plus the extra fare of $9.60, plus the Pullman charge (e.g. $9 for a lower berth), for a total of $51.30, equal to $941.8 today. This fare entitled a passenger to a bed closed off from the aisle by curtains; a compartment to oneself cost more. In 1928, the peak year, the train earned revenue of $10 million and was believed to be the most profitable train in the world.

=== New train sets ===
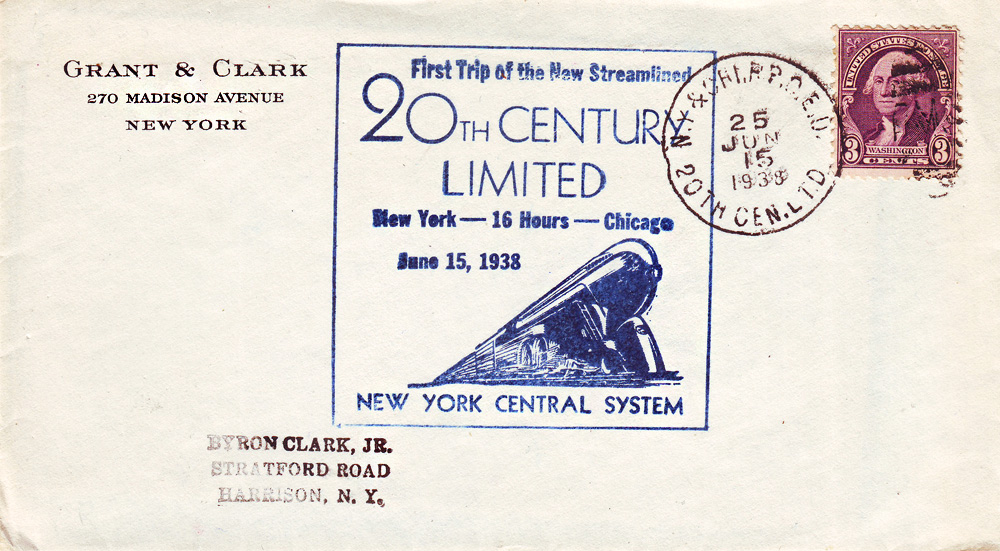
Cover carried in the RPO of the first streamlined New York-Chicago run

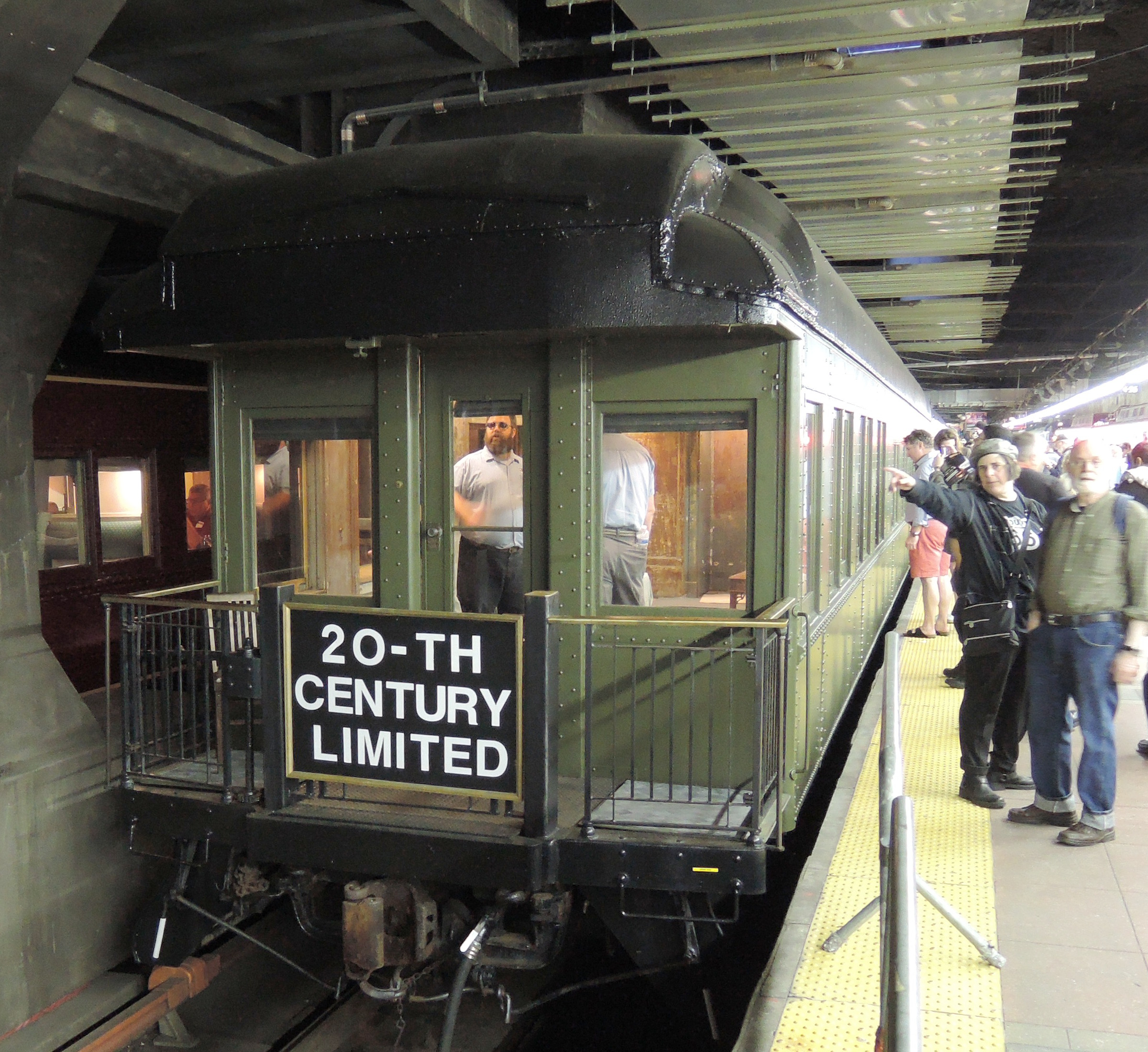
The Tonawanda Valley car, displayed in the Grand Central Centennial Parade of Trains

In 1938, industrial designer Henry Dreyfuss was commissioned by the New York Central to design streamlined train sets in Art Deco style, with the locomotive and passenger cars rendered in blues and grays (the colors of the New York Central). The streamlined sets were inaugurated on June 15. His design was probably the most famous American passenger train. The first new 20th Century Limited train left New York City at 18:00 Eastern Time and arrived at Chicago's LaSalle Street Station the following morning at 09:00 Central Time, traveling 960.7 miles (1,546 km) at an average 60 miles per hour (97 km/h). The eastbound train left LaSalle Street Station in Chicago at 15:00 and arrived at Grand Central Terminal the following morning at 08:00. For a few years after World War II, the eastward schedule was shortened to 15 1/2 hours.

In 1945, EMD diesel-electrics replaced steam, and two new diesel-electric-powered trainsets were commissioned. The replacement was inaugurated by General Dwight D. Eisenhower in September, 1948. This set was featured in postwar films such as North by Northwest and The Band Wagon.

Like many express passenger trains through the mid-1960s, the 20th Century Limited carried an East Division (E.D.) Railway Post Office (R.P.O.) car operated by the Railway Mail Service (RMS) of the United States Post Office Department which was staffed by USPOD clerks as a "fast mail" on each of its daily runs. The mails received by, postmarked, processed, sorted and dispatched from the 20th Century Limited's RPOs were either canceled or backstamped (as appropriate) during the trip by hand-applied circular date stamps (CDS) reading "N.Y. & CHI. R.P.O. E.D. 20TH CEN.LTD." and the train's number: "25" (NY–CHI) or "26" (CHI–NY).

For much of its history before 1957, the all-Pullman train made station stops only at Grand Central Terminal and Harmon for New York–area passengers and LaSalle Street Station and Englewood for Chicago-area passengers. These traveled in as many as seven sections (each was a separate, complete train), of which the first was named the Advance 20th Century Limited. In 1957, the 20th Century Limited schedule added more station stops to the original four (two terminals and two suburban stops). In the 1960s, the NYC added slumbercoaches to the roster of sleeping cars.

=== Demise ===
By the late 1960s, the train was in decline. On December 2, 1967, at 18:00, the half-full train left Grand Central Terminal's Track 34 for the last time. As always, carnations were given to men and perfume and flowers to women boarding the train. The next day, it arrived at LaSalle Street Station in Chicago 9 hours 50 minutes late due to a freight derailment near Conneaut, Ohio, which forced a slow rerouting over the parallel Nickel Plate Railroad freight line.

=== Today ===
Amtrak now operates the Lake Shore Limited between New York Penn Station and Chicago Union Station. It follows a route similar to the 20th Century's, except west of Whiting, Indiana (near Chicago), where it switches to the former Pennsylvania Railroad's Pittsburgh, Fort Wayne and Chicago Railway.

On August 26, 1999, the United States Postal Service issued 33-cent All Aboard! 20th Century American Trains commemorative stamps featuring five celebrated American passenger trains from the 1930s and 1940s. One of the five stamps features an image of a streamlined J-3a steam locomotive leading the 20th Century Limited out of the Chicago railyards on its way to New York, with the Board of Trade Building in the background.

Several 20th Century Limited passenger cars and its red carpet were included in the Grand Central Centennial Parade of Trains, part of the terminal centennial celebration in 2013.

In 2023, two of the restored traincars, Hickory Creek and Tavern-Lounge No. 43, were offered for Spring and Fall day trip excursions between New York City and Albany, New York while attached to the rear of an Amtrak Empire Service train. In September, a special trip from New York to Chicago and back was offered.

In December 2024, the observation car "Hickory Creek" was part of MTA Metro North's Employee Holiday Train.

=== Sample consists ===
Eastbound train #38—Advance 20th Century Limited, on February 7, 1930; Sampled at Chicago.

- Locomotive: J-1 Class (4-6-4 Hudson) steam locomotive; NYC #5270;
- Class CS Baggage-club car: NYC EAGLE HEIGHTS;
- Class PS Sleeper (14-section): STAR VIEW;
- Class PS Sleeper (8-section 1-drawing room 2-compartment): SPRING GAP;
- Class PS Sleeper (6-compartment 3-drawing room): GLEN ALICE;
- Class DA Dining car: NYC 387;
- Class PS Sleeper (14-section): STAR SPUR;
- Class PS Sleeper (10-section 2-double drawing rooms): GANNETT PEAK;
- Class PS Sleeper (8-section 1-drawing room 2-compartments): GLOVER GAP;
- Class PSO Sleeper-Buffet-Lounge-Observation (1-drawing room 1-single bedroom): MOHAWK VALLEY.

Westbound train #25—20th Century Limited, on March 17, 1938; Sampled at New York City

- Locomotive: Class T3A Electric Locomotive;
- Class MP Postal car: NYC #4857;
- Class CS Baggage-club car: NYC VAN TWILLER;
- Class PS Sleeper (8-section 1-drawing room 2-compartment): CENTACORRA;
- Class PS Sleepers (6-section 6-double bedroom): POPLAR PARK;
- Class PS Sleepers (6-section 6-double bedroom): POPLAR HIGHLANDS;
- Class PS Sleeper (6-compartment 3-drawing room): GLEN ANNA;
- Class DA Dining cars: NYC 654;
- Class DA Dining cars: NYC 655;
- Class PS Sleeper (6-section 6-double bedroom): POPLAR GROVE;
- Class PS Sleepers (13-double bedroom): MACOMB HOUSE;
- Class PS Sleepers (13-double bedroom): PRINGLE HOUSE;
- Class PSO Sleeper-Buffet-Lounge-Observation (1-drawing room 1-single bedroom): ELKHART VALLEY.

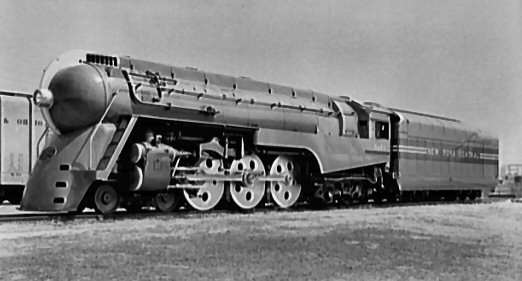
One of the NYC Hudsons fitted with the streamlined casing designed by Henry Dreyfuss

Eastbound train #26—20th Century Limited, on September 6, 1943; departing Chicago.

- Class J-3a (4-6-4 Hudson) steam locomotive: NYC 5450;
- Class MB Baggage-mail car: NYC #5017;
- Class DDL Dormitory-buffet-lounge car: CENTURY CLUB;
- Class PS Sleeper (10-roomettes 5-double bedroom): CASCADE WONDER;
- Class PS Sleeper (17-roomette): CITY OF CLEVELAND;
- Class PS Sleeper (17-roomette): CITY OF DAYTON;
- Class PS Sleeper (10-roomette 5-double bedroom): CASCADE GLORY;
- Class PS Sleeper (10-roomette 5-double bedroom): CASCADE WHIRL;
- Class PS Sleeper (4-Double Bedroom 4-compartment 2-drawing room): IMPERIAL FOUNTAIN;
- Class DA Dining car: NYC 680;
- Class DA Dining car: NYC 684;
- Class PS Sleeper (4-double bedroom 4 compartment 2-drawing room); IMPERIAL CITY;
- Class PS Sleeper (4-double bedroom 4 compartment 2-drawing room); IMPERIAL DOME;
- Class PS Sleeper (13-double bedroom): ONONDAGA COUNTY;
- Class PS Sleeper (13-double bedroom): HAMPDEN COUNTY;
- Class PS Sleeper (13-double bedroom): MONTGOMERY COUNTY;
- Class PS Sleeper (13-double bedroom): ASHTABULA COUNTY;
- Class PSO Sleeper-Buffet-Lounge-Observation (2-double bedrooms; 1-compartment; 1-drawing room): MAUMEE RIVER.

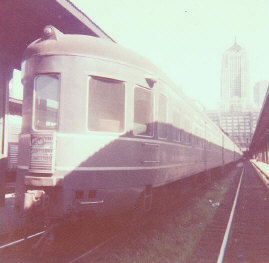
The 20th Century Limited at LaSalle Street Station, Chicago – 1963

Westbound train #25—20th Century Limited, on March 30, 1965, sampled at Cleveland, Ohio

- E7A diesel locomotive: NYC 4025;
- E8A diesel locomotive: NYC 4080;
- E7A diesel locomotive: NYC 4007;
- Class MB Baggage-mail car: NYC 5018;
- Class CSB Baggage-dormitory car: NYC 8979;
- Class PB Coach: NYC 2942;
- Class DG Grill-diner: NYC 450;
- Class PAS Sleepercoach (16-Single Room 10-Double Room): NYC 10811;
- Class PAS Sleepercoach (16-Single Room 10-Double Room): NYC 10817;
- Class PS Sleeper (22-roomette): NYC 10355 BOSTON HARBOR;
- Class DKP Kitchen-Lounge Car: NYC 477;
- Class DE Dining Room Car: NYC 406;
- Class PS Sleeper (10-roomette 6-double bedroom): NYC 10171 CURRENT RIVER;
- Class PS Sleeper (12-double bedroom): NYC 10511 PORT OF DETROIT;
- Class PS Sleeper (12-double bedroom): NYC 10501 PORT BYRON;
- Class PSO Sleeper-Buffet-Lounge-Observation (5-double bedroom): NYC 10633 HICKORY CREEK.

== Legacy ==
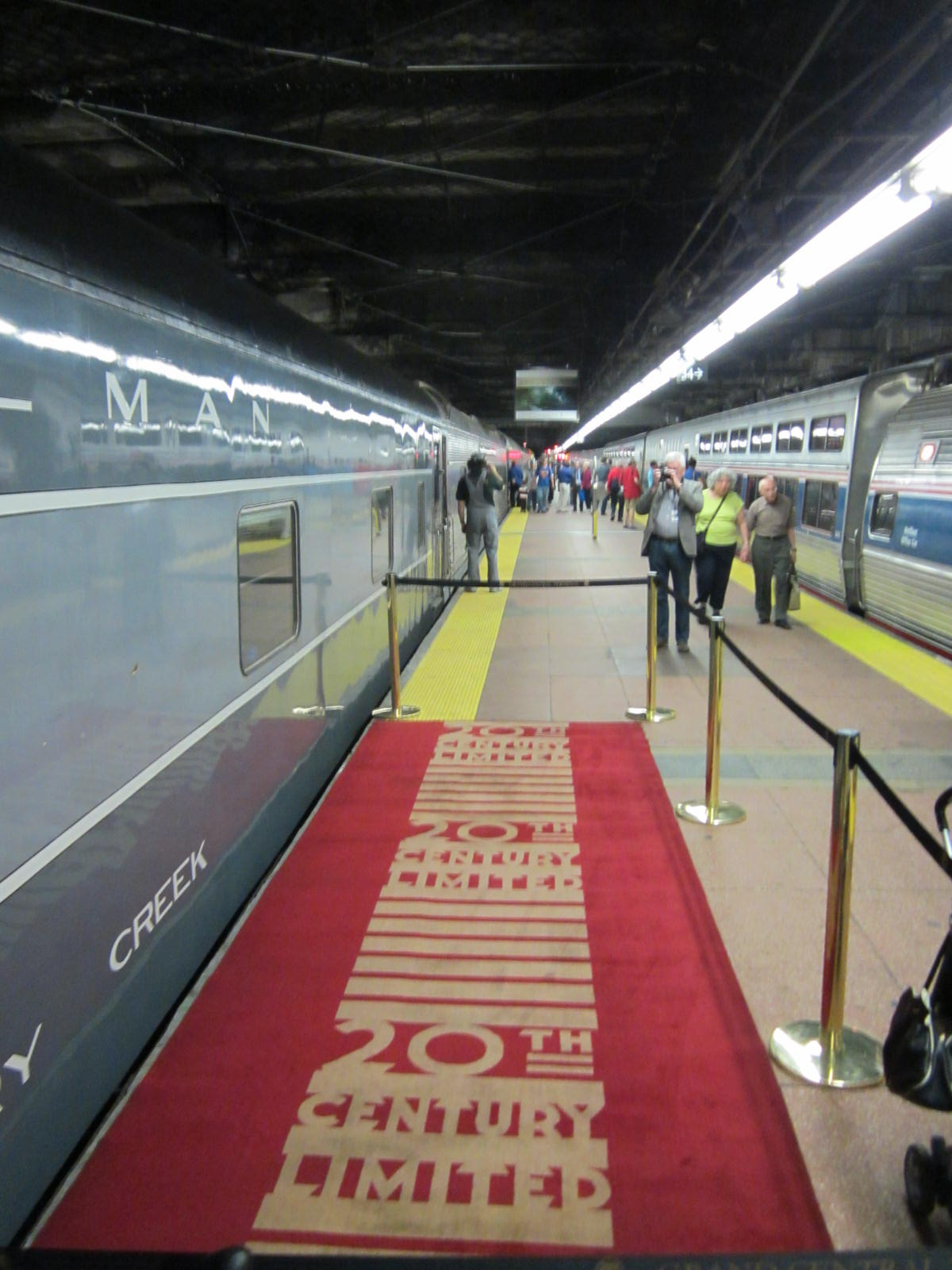
A section of one of the famous red carpets, next to the "Hickory Creek" during the Grand Central Centennial Parade of Trains. The 20th Century Limited originally departed New York City from the right-hand side of this platform.

The 20th Century Limited was advertised as "The Most Famous Train in the World". In the year of its last run, The New York Times said that it "...was known to railroad buffs for 65 years as the world's greatest train". Its style was described as "spectacularly understated ... suggesting exclusivity and sophistication". Passengers walked to the train in New York and Chicago on a specially designed crimson carpet, giving rise to the phrase "the red-carpet treatment". "Transportation historians", said the writers of The Art of the Streamliner, "consistently rate the 1938 edition of the Century to be the world's ultimate passenger conveyance—at least on the ground".

In 1926, Lucille Ball made her first trip to California from New York on the 20th Century Limited.

On October 15, 1942, after a meeting in Chicago on the Manhattan Project General Leslie Groves invited J. Robert Oppenheimer to join himself, James C. Marshall and Kenneth Nichols on their return trip to New York. After dinner on the train, they discussed the project while squeezed into Nichol's one-person roomette of about 40 in × 80 in (1 m × 2 m). Shortly afterwards Oppenheimer was appointed to head the Los Alamos Laboratory.

Regular passengers included Theodore Roosevelt, William Jennings Bryan, Lillian Russell, "Diamond Jim" Brady, J. P. Morgan, Enrico Caruso, and Nellie Melba.

=== In fiction ===
The 20th Century Limited was the setting for a Broadway musical composed by Cy Coleman and written by Betty Comden and Adolph Green entitled On the Twentieth Century, about the romantic complications of a beautiful actress and an egocentric producer/director. Madeline Kahn and John Cullum starred in the award-winning production (five Tony Awards out of nine nominations), whose spectacular production design featured both the lavish Art Deco details of the time period as well innovative staging to open up what could be cramped quarters inside a train car. The musical was based on the 1932 Ben Hecht-Charles MacArthur stage play of the same subject, which in 1934 they adapted as a film entitled Twentieth Century, directed by Howard Hawks, with Carole Lombard and John Barrymore in the lead roles. The train also figured prominently as a setting for major scenes in both Alfred Hitchcock's North by Northwest and George Roy Hill's The Sting (which incorrectly had the train arrive in Chicago at night, not in the morning as it did in reality).

While doing research for her novel Atlas Shrugged, Ayn Rand learned the operation of the train and subsequently devised a fictional company – the "Twentieth Century Motor Company" – which would be important to the novel's plot.

The 20th Century Limited is frequently referenced as a main means of train transportation of the fictional Van Dorn detective Isaac Bell in several Clive Cussler period books featuring the early 1900s detective. The Wrecker (Clive Cussler with Justin Scott) is the second in the long-running series and has Bell with other Van Dorn detectives riding the 20th Century Limited often as they pursue a train-wrecking villain.

=== Other namesakes ===
The 20th Century Limited was also the inspiration for several cultural works. A recipe for the 20th Century cocktail was published in the Cafe Royal Bar Book in 1937.
