= List of rail accidents (1980–1989) =

This is a list of rail accidents from 1980 to 1989.

== 1980 ==
- February 16 – United Kingdom – An express passenger train derailed at Bushey, Hertfordshire due to a broken rail. 19 people were seriously injured.
- April 2 – United States – Lakeview, North Carolina: Amtrak's Silver Star collided head-on with a Seaboard Coast Line freight train during dense fog, injuring 123. It was determined that the engineer of the Amtrak train failed to reduce speed and comply with approach signal indications, causing the collision.
- April 9 – United States – Western Pacific Railroad Company freight train Extra UP 3734 West (Sealand 6), had its caboose, a pusher locomotive behind the caboose, and seven cars derail while crossing the Industrial Parkway overpass at Hayward, California.Two train crewmembers were killed and two were injured.
- July 9 – United States – Amtrak passenger train 225 was struck by a 15-foot (4.6-metre) section of rail protruding from the side of a railcar at Linden, New Jersey. The rail penetrated the first car of passenger train, struck and killed a passenger, and injured 17 others.
- July 17 – United States – North Wales, Pennsylvania: SEPTA commuter train 472 being operated from the second car of the train collided with train number 406 stopped at North Wales station, injuring 67.
- July 25 – Netherlands – Winsum train collision: Two trains collided on a single track between Groningen and Roodeschool, killing nine and injuring 21.
- August 1 – Ireland – Buttevant Rail Disaster, County Cork: A train on the main Dublin – Cork line was routed by mistake into a siding and derailed, killing 18 and injuring 62.
- August 19 – Poland – Otłoczyn railway accident: A freight train ran through a red light and slammed into a passenger train traveling from Toruń to Łódź near Otłoczyn, killing 67 people and injuring 65.
- October 4 – USSR – Tallinn train crash: Two passenger trains collided at Tallinn main station (now in Estonia) after a departing train passed a red signal. Nine people were killed, 46 were injured.
- November 17 – United States – Cima Hill, California: Runaway Union Pacific Railroad train loaded with ties failed to brake and crashed into another train near Kelso, California. Three railroad workers were killed; one was critically injured.
- November 21 – Italy – Curinga train disaster: A Rome-Siracusa express train rammed into a freight train, and then derailed the Sicily-Rome express train, crushing four passenger cars at Curinga near Lamezia Terme, Catanzaro, killing 29 people and injuring 104.
- December 13 – Yugoslavia – A freight train failed to wait for an oncoming passenger train and collided with it head-on near Bosanska Krupa (now in Bosnia and Herzegovina), killing 23 people.

== 1981 ==
- January 14 – Ghana – An express train derailed between Accra and Kumasi, killing at least 21 people and injuring about 200.
- January 19 – France – An RER A express train in Paris at Auber station crashed, killing one person and injuring 73 in a rear-end collision caused by the train driver misunderstanding a new signaling system installed only two days earlier. It is the Paris RER's first fatal accident.
- January 21 - Indonesia - In Central Java, a Senja IV train departing from Purwokerto train station and Maja train departing from Kroya train station collided in Gunung Payung, near the Serayu River Bridge. 7 people were killed and dozens of people were injured.
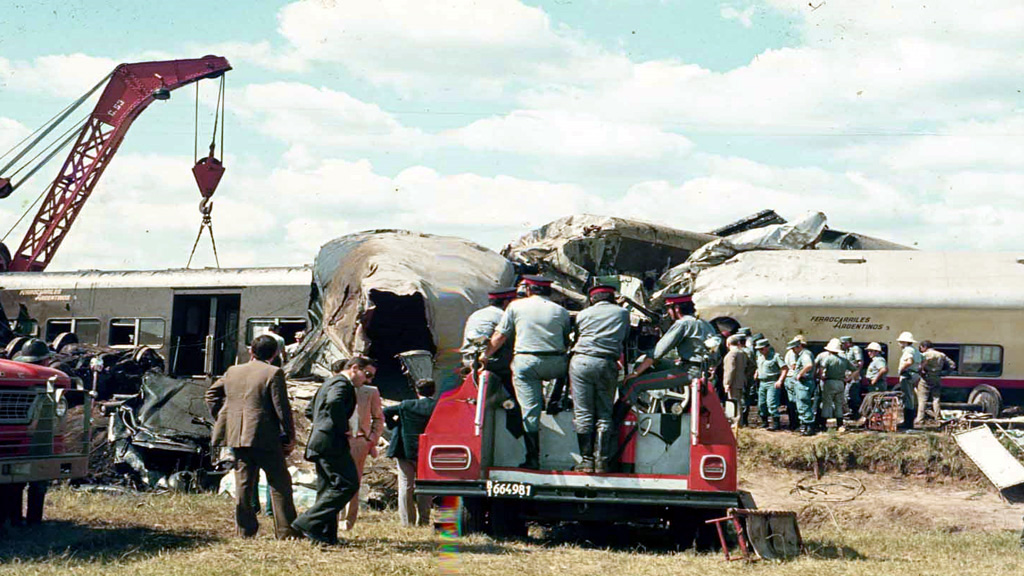
- Brandsen rail disaster
  March 8 - Argentina - Brandsen rail disaster - A passenger train collided head-on with a freight train, killing 34.
- May 14 – South Korea – An express from Busan to Seoul was stopped after hitting a motorcycle on a level crossing at Daegu. The local train following then collided with the express; killing 54.
- June 4 – Poland – Osieck rail crash: A head-on collision occurred between PKP class EN57 and a freight train. 25 people were killed, mostly railroad workers returning home from work.
- June 6 – India – Bihar train derailment: Between 300–800 were killed after a train fell into a river.
- June 25(?) – USSR – Near Gagra (now in Abkhazia, claimed by Georgia), an express train collided with a local train, killing 70 people and injuring over 100.
- July 3 – United States – A motorman was killed and 140 injured after a Manhattan bound New York City Subway train rear-ended a second train in a tunnel in the New Lots line of Brooklyn near Sutter Avenue station. The crash was blamed both on a Railway signal failure and the deceased motorman who was traveling unsafely during sporadic power outages in a dark tunnel.
- July 9 – China – 1981 Chengdu–Kunming rail crash: Passenger train No. 442 plunged into the Dadu River after the Liziyida bridge was destroyed by a mudslide 15 minutes earlier; both engines and three carriages fell into the water while a fourth overturned at the tunnel exit. 260-360 people were killed, making it the deadliest rail accident in China.
- July 16 – India – Freight and passenger trains collided at Bilaspur, Chhattisgarh, killing 38 people and injuring 42.
- July 18 – India – A derailment near Dangarva (near Ahmedabad), possibly due to sabotage, killed 35 people.
- July 31 – Pakistan – The Awar Express from Karachi en route to Lahore and Peshawar, carrying many Muslim passengers because of the end of Ramadan, derailed on damaged track, possibly due to sabotage, at Bahawalpur, killing at least 30 .
- August 11 - United States - In the Prides Crossing area of Beverly, Massachusetts (north of Boston), a Boston & Maine passenger train operated for the MBTA collided head-on with a Boston & Maine freight train, killing four people.
- August 31 – India – The derailment of a Madras to Delhi express near Asifabad Road station in Rebbena killed at least 25 people and injured at least 40.
- December 11 – United Kingdom – Seer Green rail crash: Due to heavy snow, tree branches fell onto the tracks of the line from London Marylebone to High Wycombe, between Gerrards Cross and Seer Green. While one driver stopped to clear some branches, the Gerrards Cross signalman assumed at first that the track still showed occupied on his diagram because a branch was shorting out the track circuit. He told the next train's driver to proceed with caution, but he accelerated to about 35 mph (56 km/h) and crashed into the stopped train, killing himself and three passengers.

== 1982 ==
- January 2 – United States – Southampton station (Pennsylvania): A SEPTA train collided with a gasoline tanker truck and a car at a level crossing, killing the train driver and injuring 5 others.
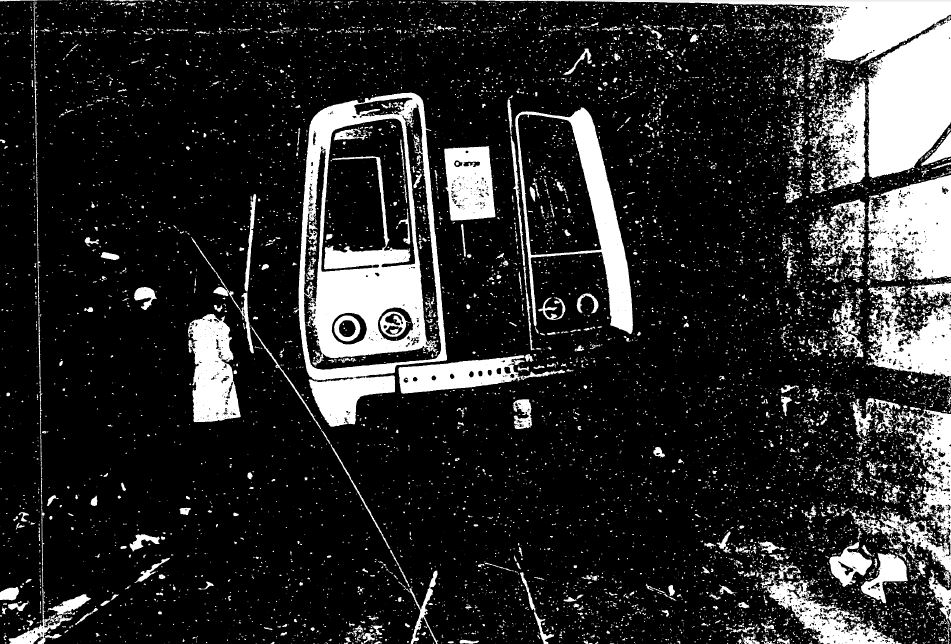
- 1982 Washington Metro train derailment
  January 13 – United States – Washington, D.C.: 1982 Washington Metro train derailment - An Orange line train derailed on the Washington Metro between the Smithsonian and Federal Triangle stations. While the train was being backed, the derailed truck drove the aluminum car into a tunnel support, killing three people.
- January 27 – Algeria – Bouhalouane train crash: An express train from Algiers to Oran, overloaded with 450 passengers, stalled while climbing a hill at Beni Helouane, prompting another locomotive to be brought in. But when the train's existing locomotive was uncoupled, braking on the passenger cars was lost and they ran away, killing at least 130 people and injuring 140.
- January 27 – India – At Agra, a late-running express crashed into a goods train in fog during a power outage, killing 63 and injuring 41. Poor visibility of the oil lamps substituting for the normal signals was suspected, but the Minister of Railways blamed the driver of the express.
- March 14 – United States – Mineola, New York: A Long Island Rail Road train hit a van at a level crossing on Herricks Road killing nine and injuring one.
- March 17 - Vietnam - Vietnam Railways passenger train 183 (also known as SE6), coming from Nha Trang, derailed while approaching a C-curve rail near Bàu Cá station, Đồng Nai province, killing over 200 passengers and crew. This is considered as the most tragic railway accident in the history of Vietnam Railways.
- May 28 – China – Liaoning, Xinmin: A passenger train overturned near Xinglongdian along Shenyang-Shanhaiguan Railway, killing three people and injuring 147.
- May 31 – United States – Colonial Heights, Virginia: A Seaboard Coast Line freight train derailed at the Swift Creek Bridge after a hard run-in of slack due to changing grades. One tank car was breached and caught fire. 12 firefighters and a state emergency official were injured during firefighting operations. It was determined that the train was traveling over the speed limit for a restricted classification and the engineer failed to control the slack action of the train while transiting changes in grades.
- July 7 – United States – Fair Lawn, New Jersey: Teenagers threw a switch and sent a commuter train into a pasta factory, killing the engineer. Four youths were charged.
- July 12 – Mexico – A Nogales-to-Guadalajara passenger train plunged into a ravine in a remote mountainous area near Tepic, killing at least 52 and injuring at least 120.
- August 2 – West Germany – Ostercappeln: Two drunk British Army soldiers from the Duke of Edinburgh's Royal Regiment, at Mercer Barracks, stole an armoured personnel carrier (AFV432) at the Osnabrück barracks and crashed into an oncoming D 15233 after the APC was driven on the Rollbahn railway tracks. Both engines of the train and five cars derailed while the tank was completely destroyed. 23 people were injured while the two soldiers were killed.
- September 12 – Switzerland – A bus carrying members of Schönaich sports association was hit by a late-running three-car regional train on a level crossing in Pfäffikon after an attendant failed to close manually operated barriers. 39 people on the bus were killed, only 2 survived.
- October 17 – Argentina – Two passenger trains collided in Quilmes, killing more than 20 and injuring 70.

== 1983 ==
- March 22 – Bangladesh – A bridge near Ishurdi collapsed under a train, with the corresponding ends of successive spans falling. The train landed on a dry section of the river bed and one car ended up almost vertical, leaning against the bridge with one end on the ground and the other in mid-air. About 60 people were killed.
- June 10 – Egypt – A train rear-ended another south of Cairo, and ended up with a baggage car standing vertically on its end that was crushed between the locomotive and the first passenger car. At least 22 people were killed and 46 injured.
- August 21 – Ireland – Cherryville Junction, County Kildare: A train which stopped after running out of fuel was rear-ended by a second train which had passed a danger signal, killing seven people and injuring 55.
- September 2 – United States – A Baltimore and Ohio Railroad train derailed near Murdock, Illinois, starting a fire which heated tanks filled with liquefied petroleum gas, resulting in two large boiling liquid expanding vapor explosions. The force of the explosion blasted one of the tanker cars 3,630 feet (1,110 m) away from the derailment.
- November 6 – China – Jiangsu, Nanjing – A passenger train and a freight train collided east of Nanjing during fog, killing one person aboard the freight train and injuring 31 passengers.
- November 23 – London – Paddington station – An overnight Penzance–Paddington sleeper service approached the station at speed without applying brakes, either by mechanical failure possibly involving cold weather, or by driver inattention, and was derailed, injuring three passengers.

== 1984 ==
- January 7 – Canada – Medicine Hat, Alberta: A Canadian Pacific Railway freight train derailed after losing braking power and gaining excessive speed upon entry into the city's river valley, killing a crew member.
- March 5 – United States – Kittrell, North Carolina: The Amtrak Silver Star derailed after overheated bearings caused an axle to break on the rear locomotive, injuring 52.
- April 6 – Burma (now Myanmar) – About 80 miles (130 km) north of Rangoon (now Yangon), a train crashed while on a bridge, killing at least 31 people.
- May 14 – China – Liaoning, Xinmin – A fire caused by a passenger lighting a cigarette broke out aboard a passenger train running from Fangjia to Dahongqi, injuring 28 passengers
- May 29, 1984 – United States – Connellsville, Pennsylvania: The Amtrak Capitol Limited derailed following a railbed washout, injuring 23. The cause was discarded tie ends from track maintenance blocking the drainage culverts.
- June 24 – United Kingdom – An express passenger train is derailed at Morpeth, Northumberland due to excessive speed on a curve, injuring 15 people.
- July 7 – United States – Williston, Vermont: The Amtrak Montrealer derailed following a railbed washout, killing five people and injuring nearly 140.
- July 14 – Yugoslavia – At Divača (now in Slovenia), a freight train violated signals and crashed at 40 mph (64 km/h) into a stationary express en route from Belgrade to Koper (now in Slovenia) and Pula (now in Croatia), killing 31 people.
- July 23 - United States - Head-on crash between Amtrak Train 151 and Amtrak Train 168 at the Hell's Gate Bridge, Queens, New York, killed a passenger and injured 125.
- July 30 – United Kingdom – Polmont rail accident, a push-pull train derailed after colliding with a cow, killing 13.
- August 16 – India – Heavy rain caused a flash flood that collapsed a narrow-gauge railway bridge between Charegaon and Balaghat. A night train from Jabalpur to Gondia then fell into the nullah, killing at least 112 people.
- October 11 – United Kingdom – Wembley Central rail crash: A passenger train overran a signal and collided with a freight train at Wembley Central station, London, killing three people and injuring 18. The cause was a signal passed at danger, apparently caused by the passenger train's driver having an attack of an unusual form of amnesia. A medical board concluded that this was due to a transient disturbance of blood flow in the posterior cerebral arteries.
- October 31 – Argentina – A commuter train rammed into a bus and shoved it 600 ft (180 m) down the rail tracks, scattering wreckage and bodies along the way at San Justo, suburb of Buenos Aires, killing 43 people; another ten were injured.
- November 23 – India – At Byculla station in Bombay (now Mumbai), a packed commuter train derailed, killing 25 people and injuring 47 .
- November 30 – United Kingdom – A passenger train was derailed by a broken rail at Stoulton, Worcestershire, injuring two people.
- December 4 – United Kingdom – Eccles rail crash: An express passenger train collided with a freight train in Eccles, Greater Manchester, killing three people and injuring 68.
- December 11 - United Kingdom - A London Underground Train crashed into a stationary train at Kilburn Train Station due to a signal error, killing one person and injuring 16.

== 1985 ==
- January 13 – Bangladesh – A fire broke out on the Samanta express train from Khulna to Parbatipur. The official death toll was 27, with at least 58 injured, but news reports said 150 or more died.
- January 13 – Ethiopia – Awash rail disaster: A derailment hurled a train into a ravine at the Ethio-Djibouti Railway, near Awash, killing at least 428 people. This accident is the worst railroad disaster in Africa.
- February 11 – United Kingdom – At Severn Tunnel Junction, various points became clogged or frozen because a winter storm overpowered the gas-fired heaters, so maintenance workers were called out to keep them closer. The workers failed to keep an adequate lookout for approaching trains and missed seeing one that did not have a bright headlight. Four workers were struck and killed.
- February 23 – India – A fire broke out aboard a train. 34 people were killed according to official figures, but newspapers reported 60-100 dead.
- March 23 – Australia – Trinder Park rail collision: Two people were killed and 31 injured after two Electric Multiple Units collided head-on.
- April 16 – United States – Granby, Colorado: The Amtrak California Zephyr derailed following a landslide under the railbed, injuring 32. The landslide, caused by extraordinarily heavy snow melt, nearly dammed the adjacent Fraser River.
- June 11 – Israel – HaBonim disaster, HaBonim: 21 people were killed, including 19 school children, in a collision between a bus on a school field trip and a train going from Haifa to Tel Aviv near HaBonim.
- June 13 – India – 38 people were killed in a collision at Agra.
- July 8 – France – Saint-Pierre-du-Vauvray accident: A passenger train collided with a lorry on a level crossing at Saint-Pierre-du-Vauvray, killing eight people and injuring 55.
- August 2 – Mozambique – RENAMO rebels in the Mozambican Civil War claimed responsibility for a derailment that killed 58 people and injured 160, but the government declared it was an accident.
- August 2 – United States – The 1985 Westminster, Colorado train collision Westminster, Colorado: Two Burlington Northern locomotives collided head-on, killing five crew members.
- August 3 – France – Two trains collided head-on near Flaujac after the stationmaster at Assier authorized a local autorail en route from Rodez to Brive to proceed onto a single-track section before remembering that an express from Paris to Capdenac was expected in the other direction. 35 people were killed and 165 injured, 29 seriously.
- August 31 – France – Near Argenton-sur-Creuse, a passenger train from Paris to Portbou (Spain) failed to slow in time at a curve and derailed before being struck by a mail train going from Brive to Paris. 43 people were killed and 38 seriously injured. The president of SNCF was forced to resign.
- September 5 or 6 – Sudan – In heavy rain, a night freight train was derailed by a washed-out embankment and plunged about 5 metres (16 ft) into a wadi near Sungikai, west of Er Rahad on the line from Kosti to Nyala. Two locomotives and a sleeping car fell vertically and last car was crushed between the other two. One crew member was killed; another went missing and was presumed drowned.
- September 11 – Portugal – Alcafache train crash: The Sud Express linking Porto-Paris collided head-on with a regional train linking Guarda-Coimbra at Alcafache (Beira Alta Line) between Nelas–Mangualde, Viseu. Officials claimed 49 were killed, but media claimed at least 150 people died.
- September 14 – Switzerland – A Lausanne–Morges passenger train collided head-on with two electric locomotives at Denges, Morges, in an incident caused by railroad worker missing a switching point at a safety catch point, killing five people and injuring 56.
- December 22 – Italy – An electric locomotive collided with a freight train in Coronella, Ferrara, killing 10 people and injuring 11.

== 1986 ==
- February 1 – South Africa – Two commuter trains collided at KwaMashu, probably due to a signal malfunction; 39 are killed and about 70 injured.
- February 8 – Canada – Hinton train collision, Dalehurst, Alberta: 23 were killed after a Via Rail passenger train and CN freight train collided head-on.
- February 17 – Chile – Queronque rail accident, a Valparaíso–Santiago express train collided head-on with local train, near Limache, killing 58 people and injuring 510. The crash prompted the full express route's cancellation.
- March 9 – United Kingdom – A passenger train collided head-on with two light engines at Chinley, Derbyshire due to a signalman's error, killing one person.
- March 10 – India – Over 50 people were killed in a collision in Bihar.
- May 5 – Portugal – Póvoa de Santa Iria train collision: a collision between two trains in the Póvoa train station killed 17 people and injured 83 others.
- May 15 – Bangladesh – A crowded express derailed near Bheramara due to sabotage (attributed to Sarbahara Marxists), and several cars fall into water; at least 25 were killed and 45 injured.
- May 18 – United States – An excursion train pulled by Norfolk and Western 611 on Norfolk Southern Railway derailed in the Great Dismal Swamp near Suffolk, Virginia. 150 people were injured, 7 critically. The cause was determined to be a worn wheel flange that picked a switch. This resulted in Norfolk Southern requiring tightlock couplers on all passenger equipment and imposing a 40 mph (64 km/h) speed restriction on all steam locomotives.
- June 15 – United Kingdom – An express passenger train derailed at Motherwell, Lanarkshire due to thermal buckling of track at a junction, injuring 12.
- July 8 – United States – Miamisburg train derailment, a Baltimore and Ohio freight train derailed along the Great Miami River in Miamisburg, Ohio, igniting phosphorus contained in some of the tanker cars and creating a huge toxic cloud. The evacuation of approximately 30,000 people across Montgomery County, Ohio, as a result was the largest evacuation in Ohio history. 569 persons were treated for various injuries, more than $3.5 million in property damage occurred, and more than $1 billion in lawsuits resulted.
- July 26 – United Kingdom – Lockington rail crash, a passenger train hit a Ford Escort van on a level crossing at Lockington, England, killing nine and injuring 59.
- September 19 – United Kingdom – Colwich rail crash, An express passenger train overran signals at Colwich, Staffordshire and came to halt foul of a junction before another express passenger train collided with it, killing one person and injuring 75.
- October 9 – United States – Twelve cars of an Amtrak passenger train derailed in rural south-central Wisconsin, killing a crewman and injuring at least 33 other people.
- November 8 – Thailand – Bangkok: Five people died and 7 were injured after an unmanned train ran away from the maintenance depot for 15 kilometers at a speed of 50 km/h toward Hua Lamphong station and hit the buffer stop.
- November 6 – USSR – Koristovka train collision, in Soviet Ukraine, trains from Kyiv to Donetsk and from Krivoy Rog (now Kryvyi Rih) to Kyiv collided head-on at Kirovograd (now Kropyvnytskyi) after one of the engine crew fell asleep and violated signals; 41 are killed.
- December 28 – Japan – An out-of-service train fell onto a fish processing factory due to strong winds at Amarube railroad bridge, Kasumi, Hyogo, killing a train conductor and five factory workers.

== 1987 ==
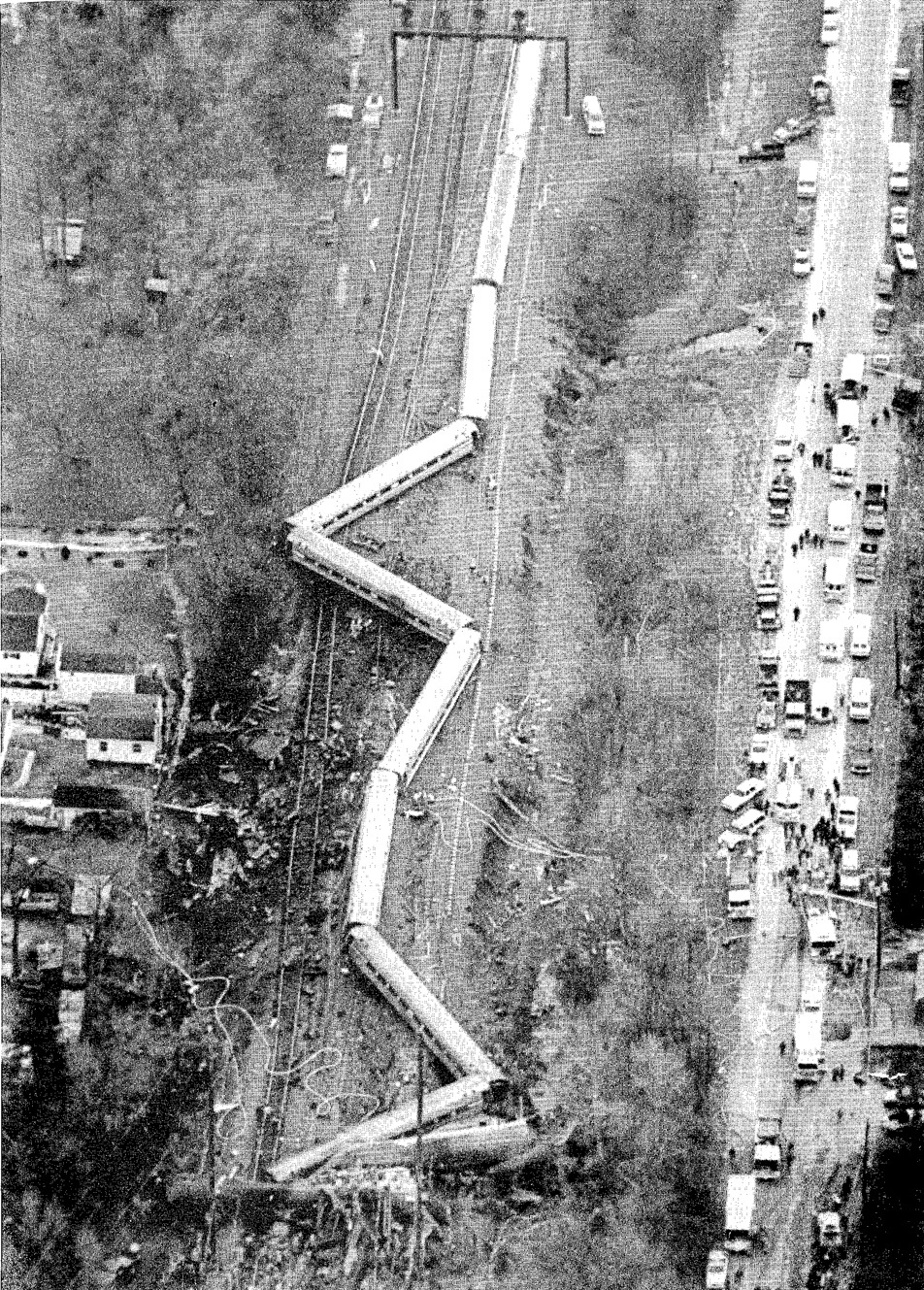
- Aerial view of 1987 Maryland train collision
  January 4 – United States – 1987 Maryland train collision, Chase, Maryland: The Amtrak Colonial express train, running at nearly 110 miles per hour (180 km/h), slammed into a consist of Conrail freight locomotives whose engineer ignored a stop signal and fouled the Northeast Corridor mainline at Gunpow Interlocking, killing the Amtrak engineer, a lounge car attendant and 14 passengers. The subsequent investigation revealed that the in-cab signaling system of the Conrail lead locomotive was inoperative and that the Conrail crew had been smoking marijuana. The accident, Amtrak's deadliest at the time, caused the US railroad industry to tighten up drug use detection among operational personnel and subsequently led to the federal certification of locomotive engineers.
- January 16 – Sudan – An accident at Kosti killed 21 people and injured 45.
- February 17 – Brazil – At Itaquera station on what is now Line 11 of the suburban train network of São Paulo, CBTU suburban train UW 56 from Brás to Mogi das Cruzes had its middle section struck by train UW 77 coming from Mogi das Cruzes at 70 km/h (43 mph). 58 were killed and 140 injured. It was reported that maintenance work caused a signal failure.
- March 9 - Canada - A Canadian National ore train ran away and derailed in New Brunswick. The engineer survived with minor injuries.
- March 24 – United Kingdom – A freight train overran a signal and collided head-on with a passenger train at Frome North Junction, Somerset. Several people were seriously injured.
- July 2 – Zaire (now Democratic Republic of the Congo) – A heavy truck from Zambia crashed into the side of a train at a level crossing in Kasumbalesa, derailing two cars and killing 128 people.
- July 8 – India – A Deccan of Hyderabad-Hazrat Nizamuddin of Delhi Dakshin Express derailed at Macherial, Andhra Pradesh, killing 53.
- August 6 – India – Some cars broke off a freight train at Palamau; an express en route from Tatanagar to Amritsar crashed into them, and several cars fall into the water. About 50 people were killed.
- August 7 – USSR – Kamensk-Shakhtinsky rail disaster: In what is now Russia, a freight train ran away at about 140 km/h (90 mph) due to brake problems and collided with a passenger train from Rostov to Moscow, killing 106 people.
- October 19 – Indonesia – Bintaro train crash: A local train from Rangkasbitung collided head-on with another local train bound for Merak, at Bintaro Jaya, south of Jakarta, killing at least 156 people and injuring at least 300. It is the worst rail accident in Indonesia's history.
- October 19 – United Kingdom – Glanrhyd Bridge collapse: Four people died after a passenger train from Swansea to Shrewsbury fell off a bridge that had collapsed due to flooding beneath the bridge acting on its piers.
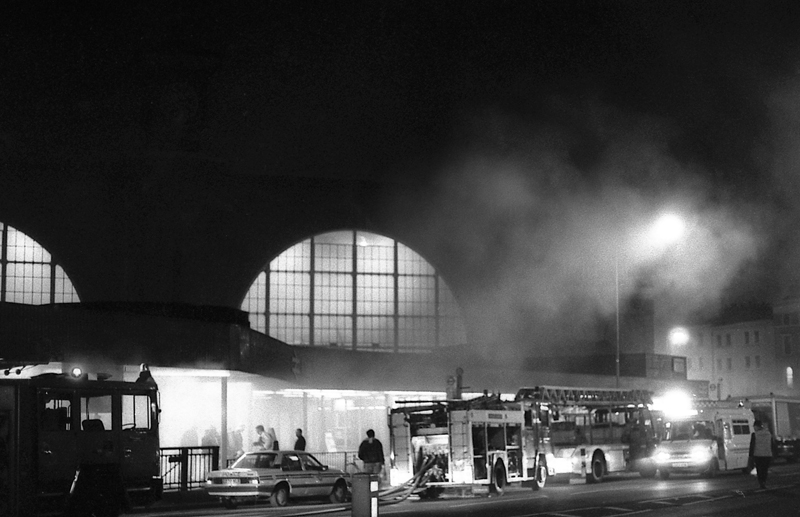
- King's Cross fire
  November 18 – United Kingdom – King's Cross fire: Grease under an escalator at King's Cross St Pancras tube station in London ignited, apparently by a dropped match, producing a flashover that killed 31 people and injured 100, 19 seriously.
- November 28 – India – At Kishangarh, a fire broke out on board a train from Ajmer to Delhi, killing at least 22 and injuring 16 ==.
- November 29 – USSR – On the line between Tbilisi (now in Georgia) and Baku (now in Azerbaijan), freight and passenger trains collided between Gardabani and Böyük Kəsik, after one of the drivers fell asleep. 30 people were killed and 66 injured.
- December 11 – Egypt – A bus carrying primary school children returning from the Giza Zoo was smashed by a high-speed train at an unmarked railroad level crossing at Ain Shams, on the outskirts of Cairo, killing 62 children and injuring 67.

== 1988 ==
- January 7 – China – A railwayman on a train from Guangzhou to Xi'an dropped a cigarette into a bucket of flammable liquid, starting a fire that killed 34 people and injured 30. He was sentenced to life in prison.
- January 14 – United States – Thompsontown, Pennsylvania: Two Conrail freight trains collided head-on after one train ignored a signal. The engineers and brakemen on both trains were killed. The crash was attributed to crew fatigue.
- January 15 – Canada – A CP Rail freight train rear-ended a switcher train on the outskirts of Regina, Saskatchewan, killing two people.
- January 17 – China – A head-on collision in Heilongjiang province killed about 18 people and injured about 72; sabotage was suspected.
- January 19 – East Germany – Forst Zinna rail disaster: A Soviet tank in Forst Zinna got stuck on a level crossing and was hit by an express train, killing six people and injuring 33.
- January 24 – China – The derailment of a special express from Kunming to Shanghai killed at least 90 people and seriously injured 66 in Yunnan Province. One source says the accident site was "near Qiewu station" about 23 mi (37 km) from Kunming, while another says it was "between Quimu and Denjiacun stations" about 346 km (215 mi) from Kunming.
- March 23 – Spain – Juneda, Catalonia. Ten children and 5 adults died after a train slammed into a bus on an unbarriered level crossing.
- March 24 – China – 1988 Shanghai–Hangzhou railway collision: Apparently due to signals being violated, an express from Nanjing to Hangzhou with 193 Japanese high-school students on board collided head-on with one going from Changsha to Shanghai, at Nanxiang in suburban Shanghai. One source said 12 people were killed (including two of the students) and 29 injured; another says 28 are killed, most of them students, and 1,209 injured.
- April 11 - United States - A trolley derailed at 33rd Street Station in Philadelphia, injuring 27 people.
- April 25 - Denmark - A train in Sorø derailed, killing 8 people and injuring 72.
- May 20 – Thailand – At Takhli, a heavy truck crashed into the side of a train at a level crossing. Several cars were derailed, some of them falling into an irrigation canal; 27 people were killed and at least 22 injured.
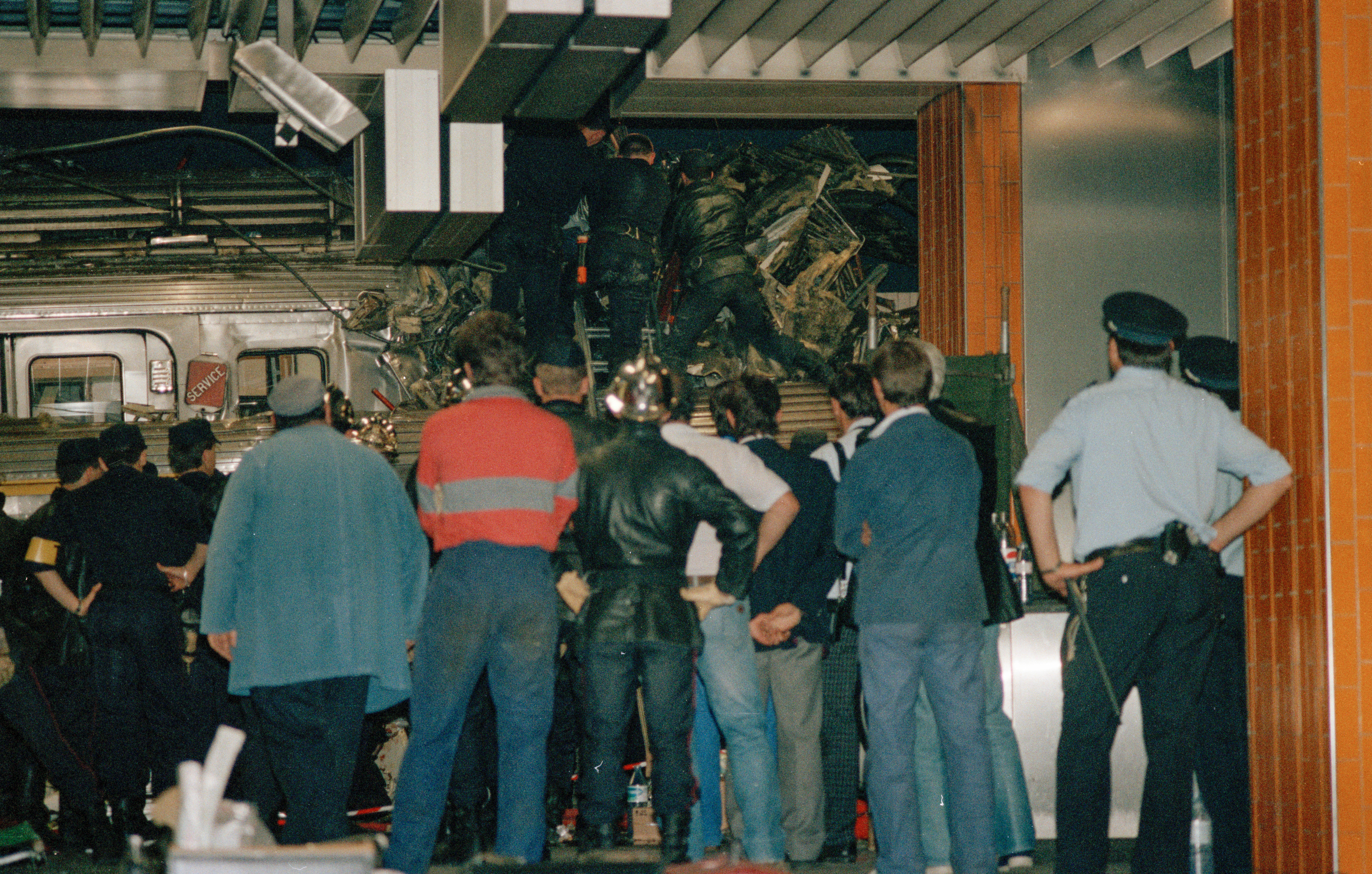
- Gare de Lyon rail accident
  June 4 – USSR – Arzamas train disaster: A freight train carrying 118 tons of explosives from Dzerzhinsk to the Kazakh SSR exploded at a railway crossing near Arzamas I railway station, Nizhny Novgorod Oblast (now in Russia), damaging 151 buildings and killing 91 people. The explosion left an 85-foot-deep (26 m) crater.
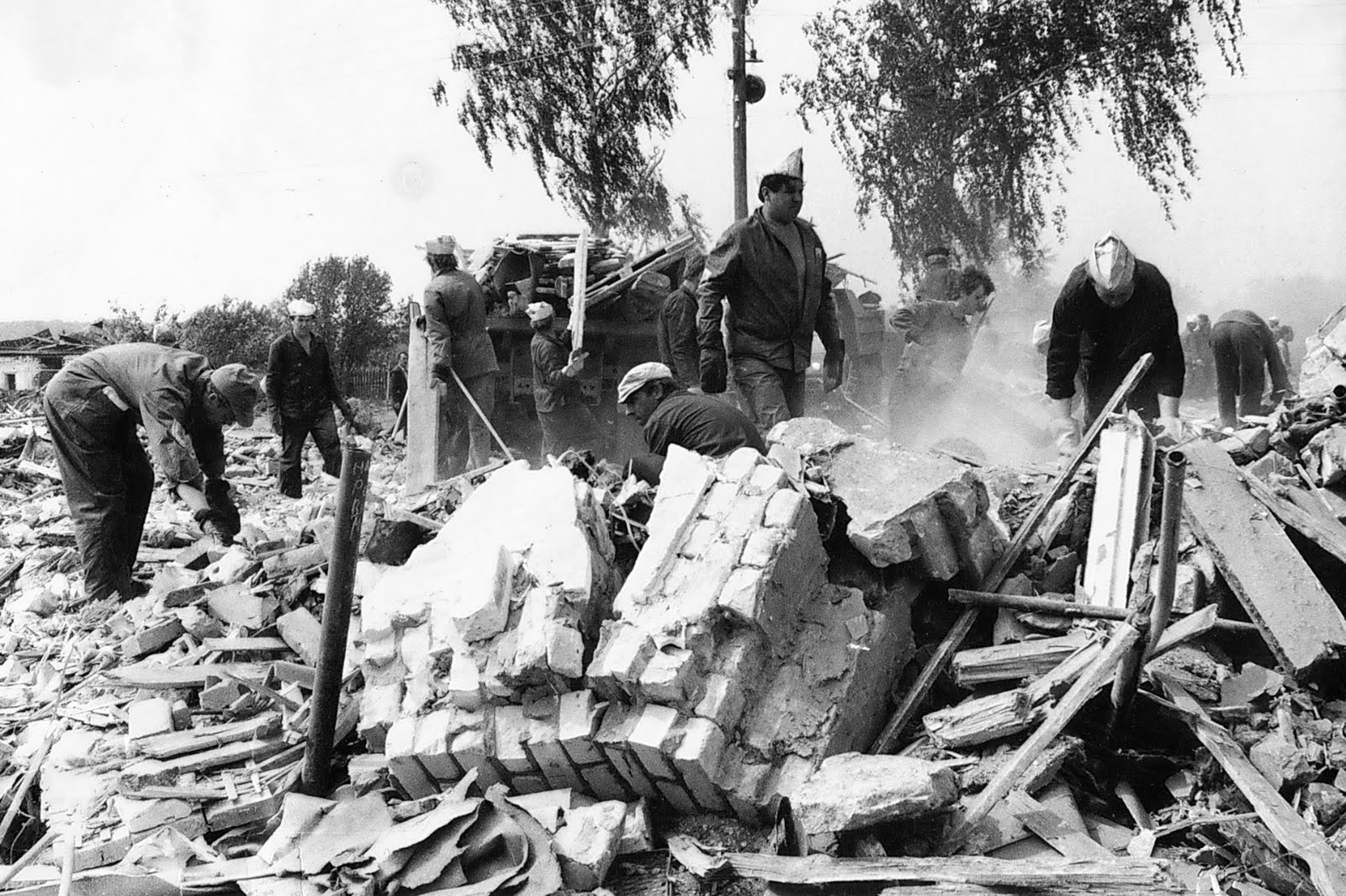
- Arzamas train disaster
  June 27 – France – Gare de Lyon rail accident: The driver of a suburban train from Melun inadvertently disabled most of the brakes following an earlier problem. The train then ran away and hit a stationary rush-hour train in the station; killing 56 people and injuring over 50.
- July 8 – India – Peruman railway accident: A Bangalore–Trivandrum Island Express derailed and plunged into Ashtamudi Lake on the outskirts of Kollam, Kerala, drowning 107 people.
- August 16 – USSR – A high-speed train traveling from Leningrad (now Saint Petersburg) to Moscow derailed near Bologoye, killing 30 people and injuring about 180.
- October 9 – Yugoslavia – In what is now Serbia, the rear cars of a train from Skopje (now in North Macedonia) to Belgrade derailed while passing a stationary freight train in the station at Lapovo, and smashed into the freight locomotive. At least 33 were killed and 15 injured.
- December 12 – United Kingdom – Clapham Junction rail crash, London: wrong side failure from electrical short circuit caused by faulty signal maintenance killed 35 people and injured more than 100.

== 1989 ==
- January 15 – Bangladesh – At Pubail, Gazipur District, a northbound mail train collided head-on with an express going to Chittagong because railway staff did not know how to operate the new signal system, with several cars rolling off an embankment into a paddy field. At least 170 were killed and over 400 injured.
- February 2 – Bangladesh – 13 people were killed and about 200 injured in a derailment at Chattogram, about 20 miles (32 km) from Chittagong.
- February 2 – United States – 1989 Helena train wreck - A runaway train crashed into parked rail cars.
- March 2 – Ethiopia – A freight train, with many people riding on it, collided with some empty cars killing 57 people and injuring 54.
- March 4 – United Kingdom – Purley station rail crash, London: A train crossing over from one track to another was struck by a second train which ran a red signal, killing six people and injuring 94.
- March 6 – United Kingdom – Glasgow Bellgrove rail accident, two commuter trains crashed at Bellgrove station in the East End of Glasgow, killing a passenger and a train driver.
- April 3 – Italy – Two cars of the train from Bari derailed and slammed against the rail at San Severo, Foggia, killing eight and injuring 20.
- April 16 – India – Karnataka express train derailed at Lalitpur, Uttar Pradesh, killing 75 people.
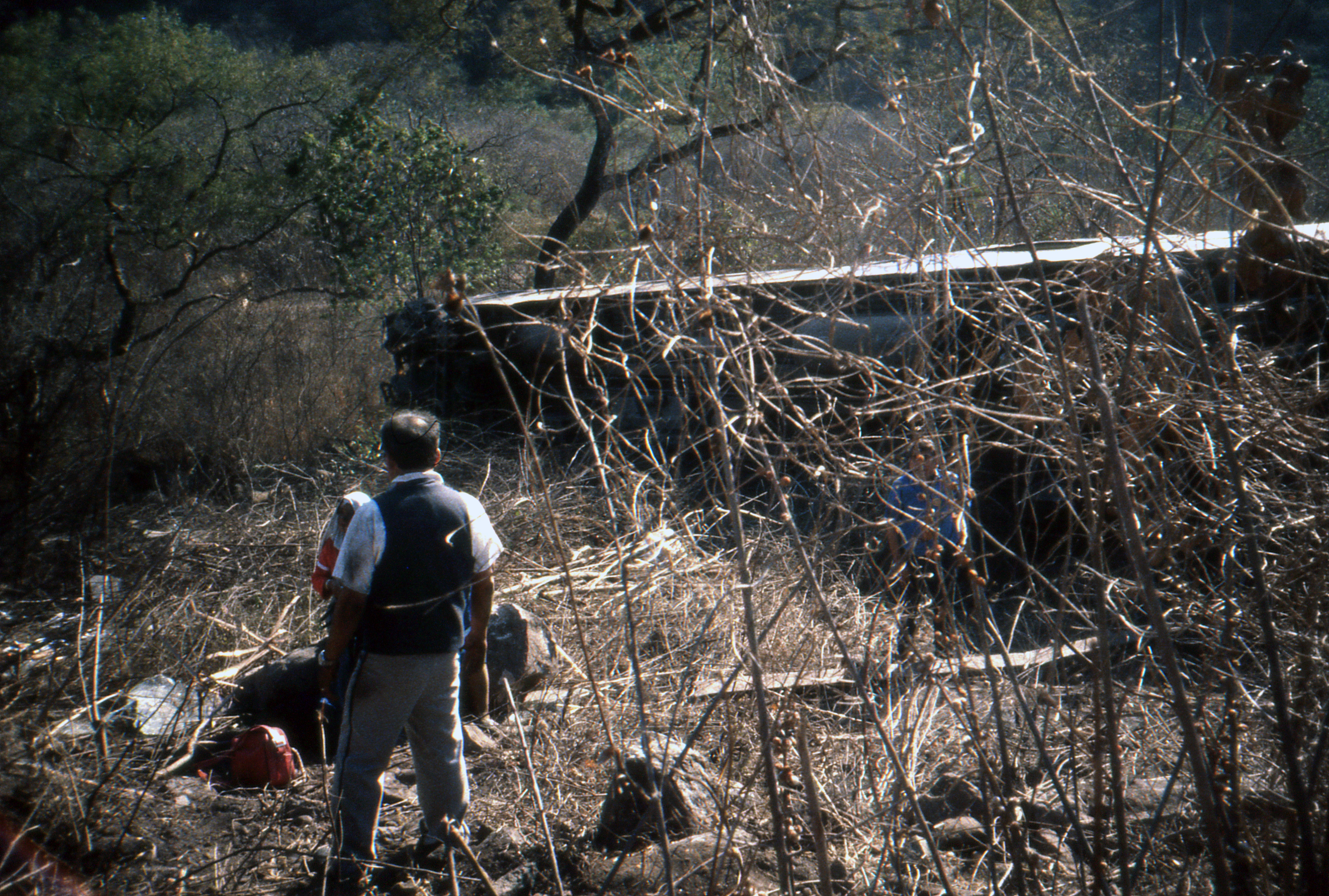
- Tepic, Mexico train derailment
  May 3 - Mexico – At least nine are killed when a train derails in Tepic, Mexico after losing control while going down a grade.
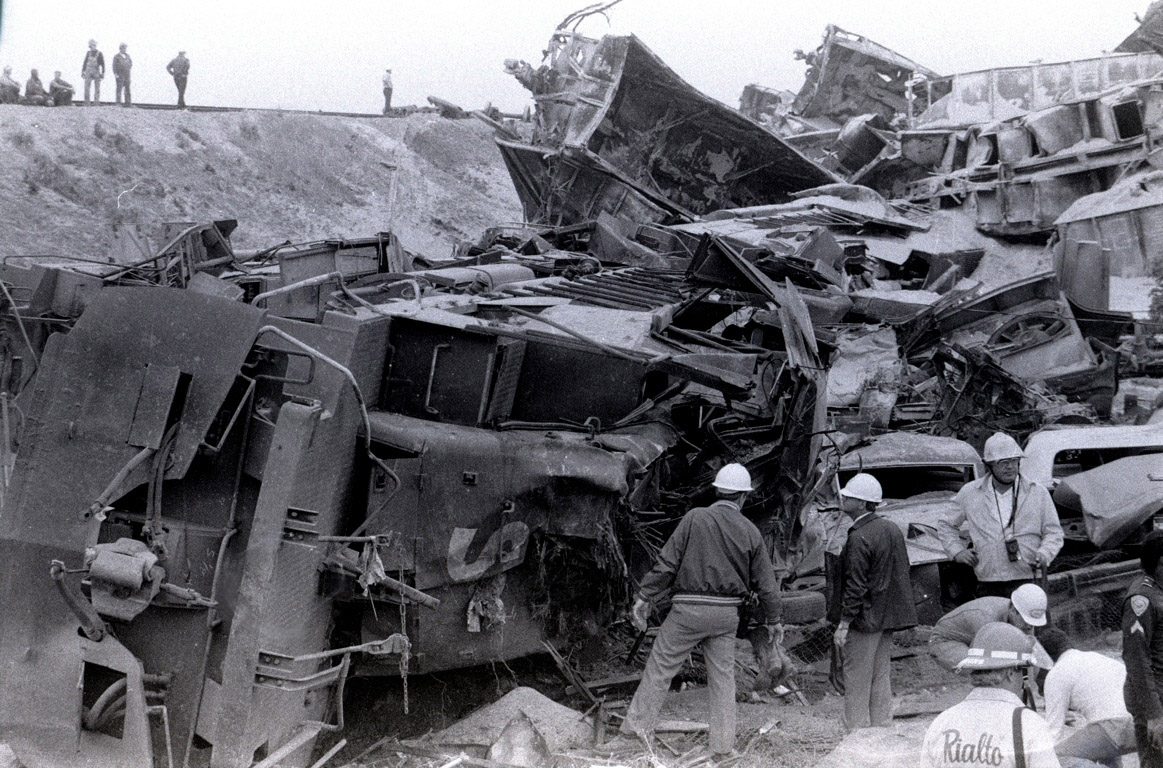
- San Bernardino train disaster
  May 12 – United States – San Bernardino train disaster: A Southern Pacific Railroad freight train with insufficient working brakes ran away descending the steep Cajon Pass and derailed into houses on Duffy Street in San Bernardino, California, killing two crew members and two children and destroying seven houses. A high-pressure fuel pipeline, damaged during the cleanup process, burst 13 days after the derailment; the resulting fire killed two more people and destroyed another eleven houses.
- May 19 – Mozambique – A collision of two trains in Zambezia Province killed at least 28 and injured 48.
- May 24 – Thailand – A train from Chiang Mai to Bangkok derailed into a ravine about 300 miles (480 km) north of its destination, killing at least 22 people; an early report blamed brake failure.
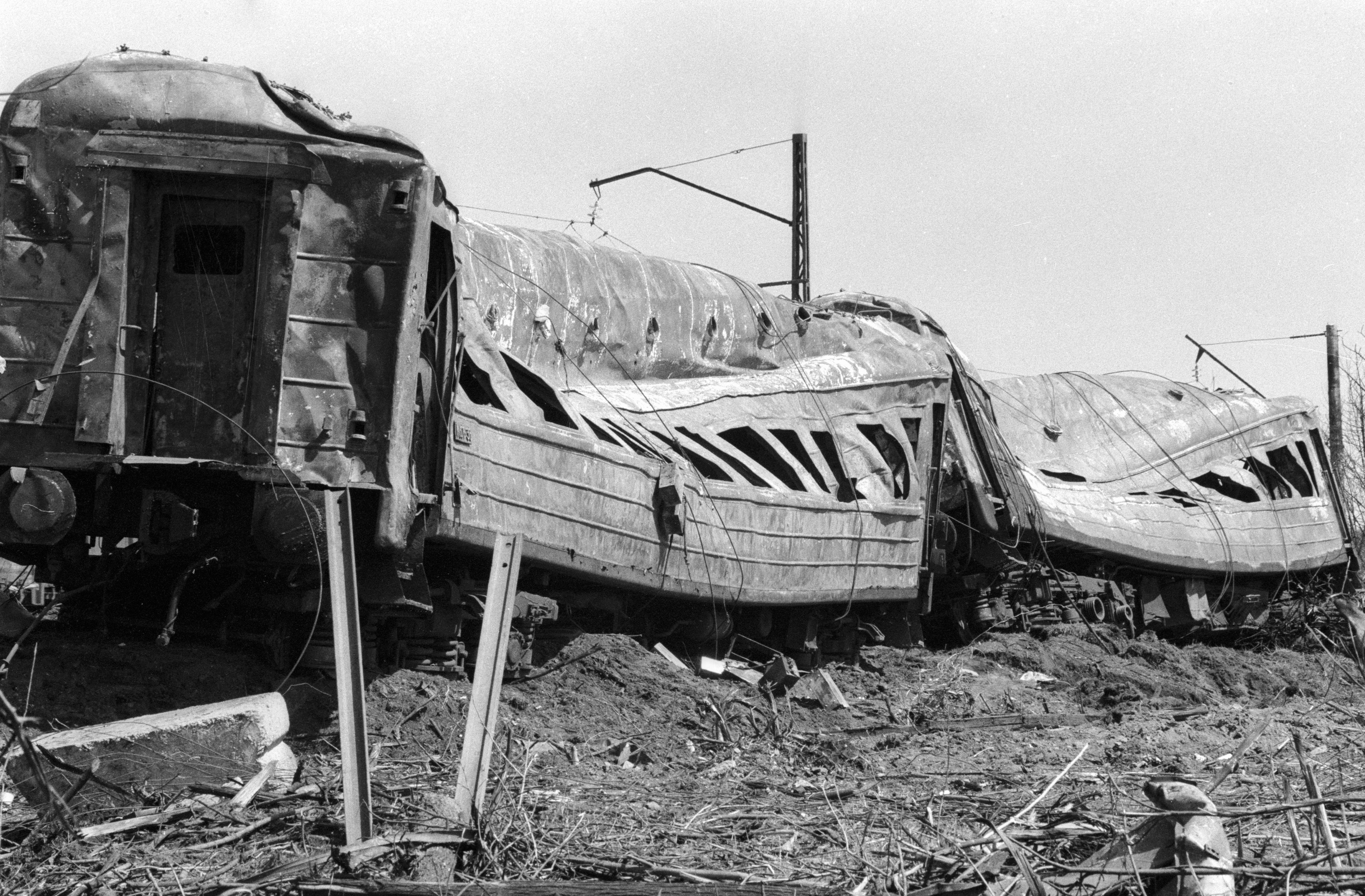
- Ufa train disaster
  June 4 – USSR – Ufa train disaster: Near Asha (now in Russia), 575 people were killed and over 600 wounded after two trains passed near a leaking natural gas line which exploded.
- June 26 – China – An explosion in the toilet compartment of a train from Hangzhou to Shanghai killed 20 people and injured 11. It was not known whether the blast was malicious or accidental as passengers who work with explosives sometimes hide theirs in that area due to restrictions on carrying such items.
- August 4 – Cuba – A head-on collision of two passenger trains at Colón killed 32 people and injured 17.
- August 10 – Mexico – San Rafael River train wreck: A train carrying 330 people plunged off a bridge into the San Rafael River, killing 112.
- November 1 – India – Udyan Abha Toofan express train derailed at Sakaldiha, Bihar, killing at least 48 people.
- November 6 – United Kingdom – two diesel multiple units collided head-on at Huddersfield, West Yorkshire. 17 people were hospitalized.
- November 10 – Iraq – A derailment south of Mosul killed at least 50 people.
- November 10 – Czechoslovakia – Near Nové Kopisty, the international Balt-Orient express missed a red signal and crashed into a passenger train that had stopped due to technical issues. Six people died and 58 were injured
- November 16 – Italy – In Crotone, two passenger trains collided on the Crotone–Catanzaro line, killing 12 people and injuring 32.
- November 20 – Australia – A Melbourne suburban Hitachi train collided into a stationary suburban Comeng train at Syndal railway station, injuring 75 people.

== See also ==
- List of road accidents – includes level crossing accidents.
- List of British rail accidents
- List of Russian rail accidents
- List of rail accidents in France
- Years in rail transport

== Sources ==
- Earnshaw, Alan (1989). Trains in Trouble: Vol. 5. Penryn: Atlantic Books. ISBN 0-906899-35-4.
- Earnshaw, Alan (1990). Trains in Trouble: Vol. 6. Penryn: Atlantic Books. ISBN 0-906899-37-0.
- Earnshaw, Alan (1991). Trains in Trouble: Vol. 7. Penryn: Atlantic Books. ISBN 0-906899-50-8.
- Earnshaw, Alan (1993). Trains in Trouble: Vol. 8. Penryn: Atlantic Books. ISBN 0-906899-52-4.
- Haine, Edgar A. (1993). Railroad wrecks. Associated University Presses. ISBN 978-0-8453-4844-4.
- Hall, Stanley (1990). The Railway Detectives. London: Ian Allan. ISBN 0-7110-1929-0.
- Kichenside, Geoffrey (1997). Great Train Disasters. Bristol: Siena Books. ISBN 0-7525-2630-8.
- Rolt, L. T. C.; Kichenside, G. M. (1982). Red for Danger: A history of railway accidents and railway safety (4th ed.). Newton Abbot, Devon: David & Charles. ISBN 0-7153-8362-0. OCLC 9526651.
- Semmens, Peter (1994). Railway Disasters of the World: Principal Passenger Train Accidents of the 20th Century. Patrick Stephens Ltd. ISBN 1-85260-323-2.
- Shaw, Robert B. (1978). A History of Railroad Accidents, Safety Precautions and Operating Practices. LCCN 78104064.
- Trevena, Arthur (1981). Trains in Trouble: Vol. 2. Redruth: Atlantic Books. ISBN 0-906899-03-6.
