= Wembley Central station =

London Underground and railway station

Wembley Central
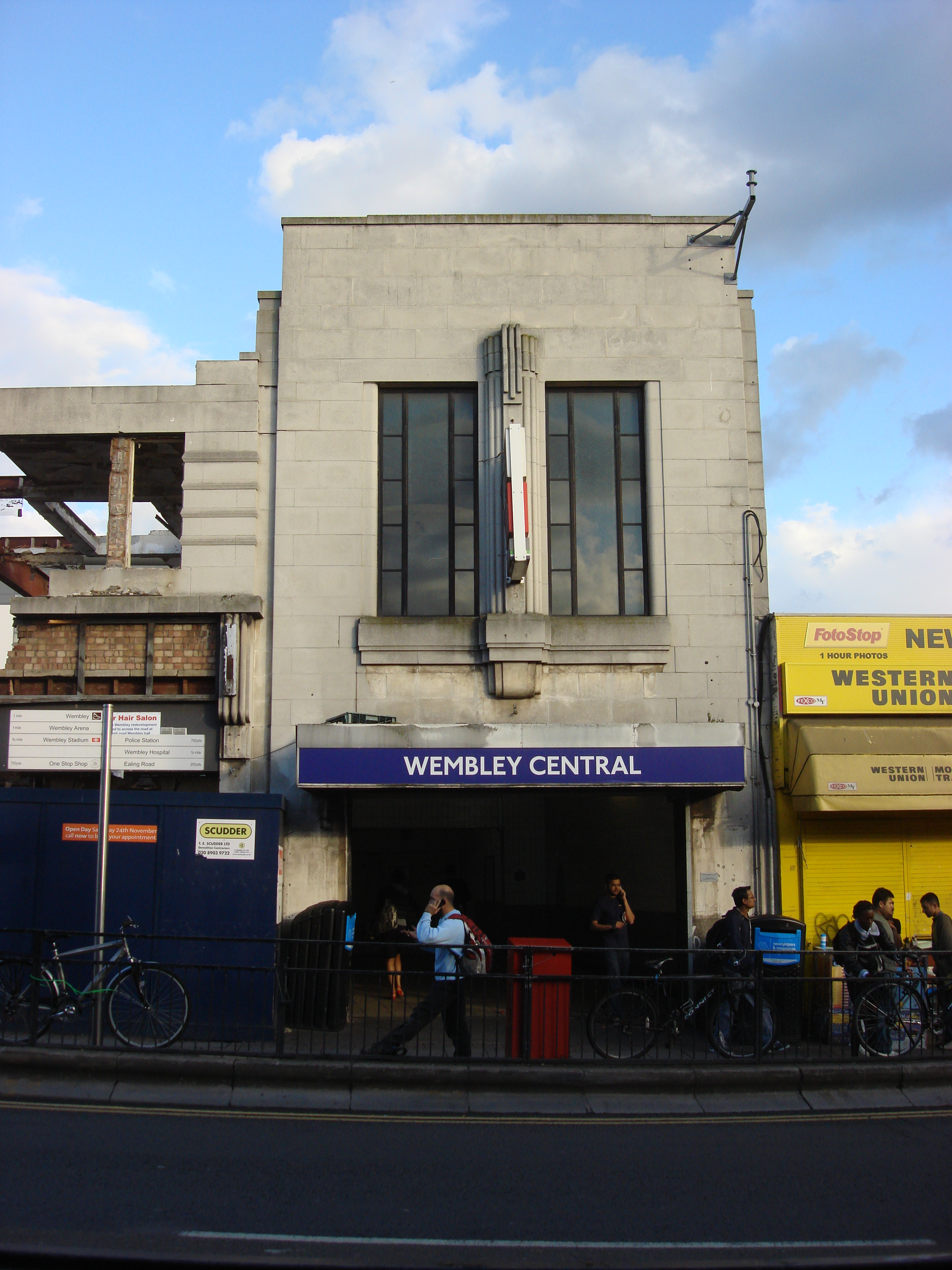
- Previous station entrance
- Interactive map of Wembley Central

General information
- Location: Wembley
- Local authority: London Borough of Brent
- Managed by: London Underground
- Owner: Network Rail
- Station code: WMB
- DfT category: C2
- Number of platforms: 6 (4 in regular use)
- Accessible: Yes
- Fare zone: 4

London Underground annual entry and exit
- 2021: ▼2.71 million
- 2022: ▲4.37 million
- 2023: ▲4.60 million
- 2024: ▲4.73 million
- 2025: ▲4.84 million

National Rail annual entry and exit
- 2020–21: ▼1.345 million
- Interchange: ▼46,777
- 2021–22: ▲2.732 million
- Interchange: ▲92,052
- 2022–23: ▲3.340 million
- Interchange: ▼50,670
- 2023–24: ▲3.710 million
- Interchange: ▲59,289
- 2024–25: ▲4.446 million
- Interchange: ▲82,629

Key dates
- 1842: Station opened as "Sudbury"
- 1 May 1882: Renamed "Sudbury & Wembley"
- 1 November 1910: renamed "Wembley for Sudbury"
- 16 April 1917: Bakerloo line
- 1948: Street level buildings reconstructed within shopping arcade
- 5 July 1948: renamed "Wembley Central"
- 24 September 1982: Bakerloo line service withdrawn
- 4 June 1984: Bakerloo line service re-instated
- June 2008: Station building demolished for re-development
- 2009-2015: Major re-development of the station and the area.

Other information
- External links: TfL station info page; Departures; Facilities
- Coordinates: 51.5526°N 0.2966°W

Wembley Central is an interchange station in Wembley, north-west London. It is situated on the east-west High Road and is near to both Wembley Stadium and Wembley Arena. The station, which is in London fare zone 4, provides Bakerloo line services of the London Underground, Lioness line services of the London Overground, and National Rail services operated by Southern on the West Coast Main Line.

== History ==
On 20 July 1837, the London and Birmingham Railway line opened, and in 1842 this station opened as "Sudbury". It was later renamed to "Sudbury and Wembley" in 1882, and then again to "Wembley for Sudbury" in 1910, coinciding with the construction of the LNWR New Line. Bakerloo line services over the New Line began on 16 April 1917.

In 1936 street level buildings were reconstructed with a shopping arcade, and in 1948, further work took place in preparation for the Olympic Games at Wembley Stadium. The station was renamed again on 5 July 1948, this time to "Wembley Central", the name that is still in use. Station Square was constructed by Ravenseft Properties Limited in 1965, taking the form of a 2 1/2 acres (1.0 ha) concrete raft over the station (see also Stratford Centre), providing most of the current station layout. Bakerloo line services were withdrawn on 24 September 1982, but later reinstated on 4 June 1984.

In November 2007, station management transferred from Silverlink to London Underground. The 1936 and 1948 surface buildings were being demolished in June 2008 in preparation for redevelopment. Southern services between Milton Keynes and East Croydon began here in February 2009, with an off-peak service pattern of one train per hour per direction on Monday to Saturday. London Midland services between London Euston and Tring were introduced in December 2014, also with an off-peak service pattern of one train per hour per direction on Monday to Saturday, but this was later withdrawn in December 2022 by London Northwestern Railway.

== Accidents and incidents ==
- On 13 October 1940, an express passenger train was derailed after it collided with a platform barrow obstructing the line. Several people were killed and many more were injured.
- In 1984, a passenger train overran a signal and collided with a freight train, killing three people.

== Services and operations ==
Services at Wembley Central are operated by Bakerloo line of the London Underground, Lioness line of the London Overground, and Southern on the West London line of the National Rail. The off-peak service at the station in trains per hour is:

London Underground (Bakerloo line)

- 4 tph to Harrow & Wealdstone
- 4 tph to Elephant & Castle

London Overground (Lioness line)

- 4 tph to London Euston
- 4 tph to Watford Junction

Southern

- 1 tph to East Croydon
- 1 tph to Watford Junction

Preceding station	London Overground	Following station
North Wembley towards Watford Junction	Lioness line Watford DC line	Stonebridge Park towards Euston
Preceding station	London Underground	Following station
North Wembley towards Harrow & Wealdstone	Bakerloo line	Stonebridge Park towards Elephant & Castle
Preceding station	National Rail	Following station
Harrow & Wealdstone	Southern West London Line	Shepherd's Bush

Wembley Central has the appearance of an underground station due to the elevated position of the High Road (where the main entrance was until recently behind a 1940s shopping arcade) and the enclosed nature of the platforms below the raft upon which Station Square is built; it is actually generally at or above the local ground level, having been reconstructed by British Rail in its current form during the 1960s electrification of the West Coast Main Line. It is the first station out of Euston to have platforms on all three pairs of tracks and the combination of the confined space and through trains passing at speed on platforms 3-6 (the main line platforms) create a wind tunnel effect which can be dangerous for passengers.

The station was modernised in 2006 by Silverlink with additional safety features.

== Station works ==
The passenger footbridge at the London end of the station, completed in late 2006 by civil engineers C Spencer Ltd, carries extra foot traffic to and from the platforms during event days at the nearby Wembley Stadium; the everyday access is at the "country" end of the platforms. In practice, this means the bridge is usually locked and out of use, only being opened when the stadium itself is in use.

Other recent works include the resurfacing of platforms 1 and 2 complete with the installation of curved steel cladding panels also completed by contractor, C Spencer Ltd. The station's staff received refurbished messing facilities and new public toilets have also been installed.

In 2011–12, the station was made step-free, in preparation for the Olympics. A step-free route was provided between the station entrance and platforms 1 and 2 for the first time, with the installation of two new lifts and a stair lift. The toilets were refurbished to make them fully accessible. Two platforms were extended as well. This improvement scheme cost £2.5m.

== Redevelopment ==
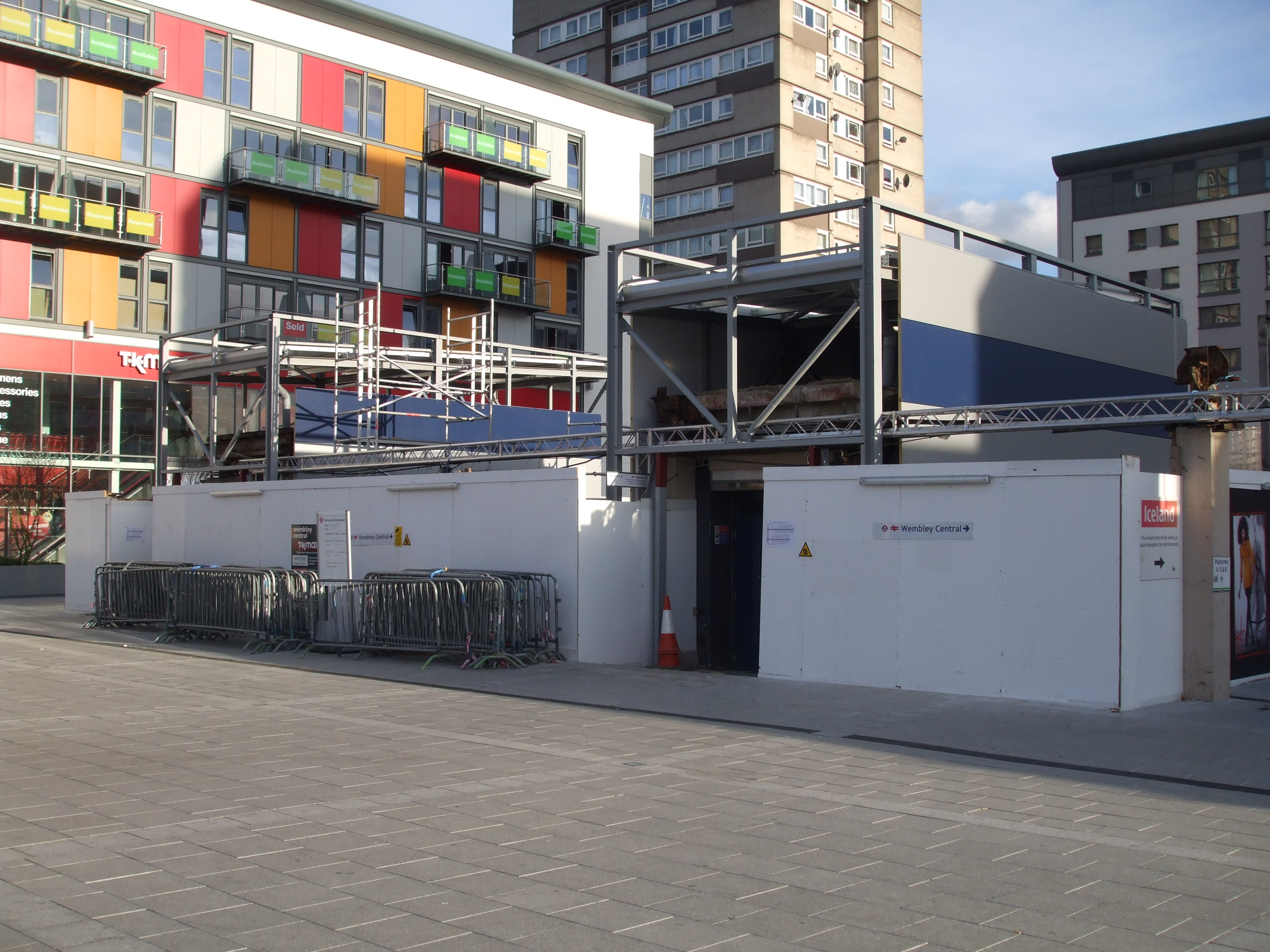
Redevelopment seen in November 2009

In June 2008, the London Borough of Brent (Local council) planned that the station was going to be demolished for redevelopment, as part of the Wembley Central Square plan, by St. Modwen construction company (although the plan also included new apartments, shops and open space surface).

== Connections ==
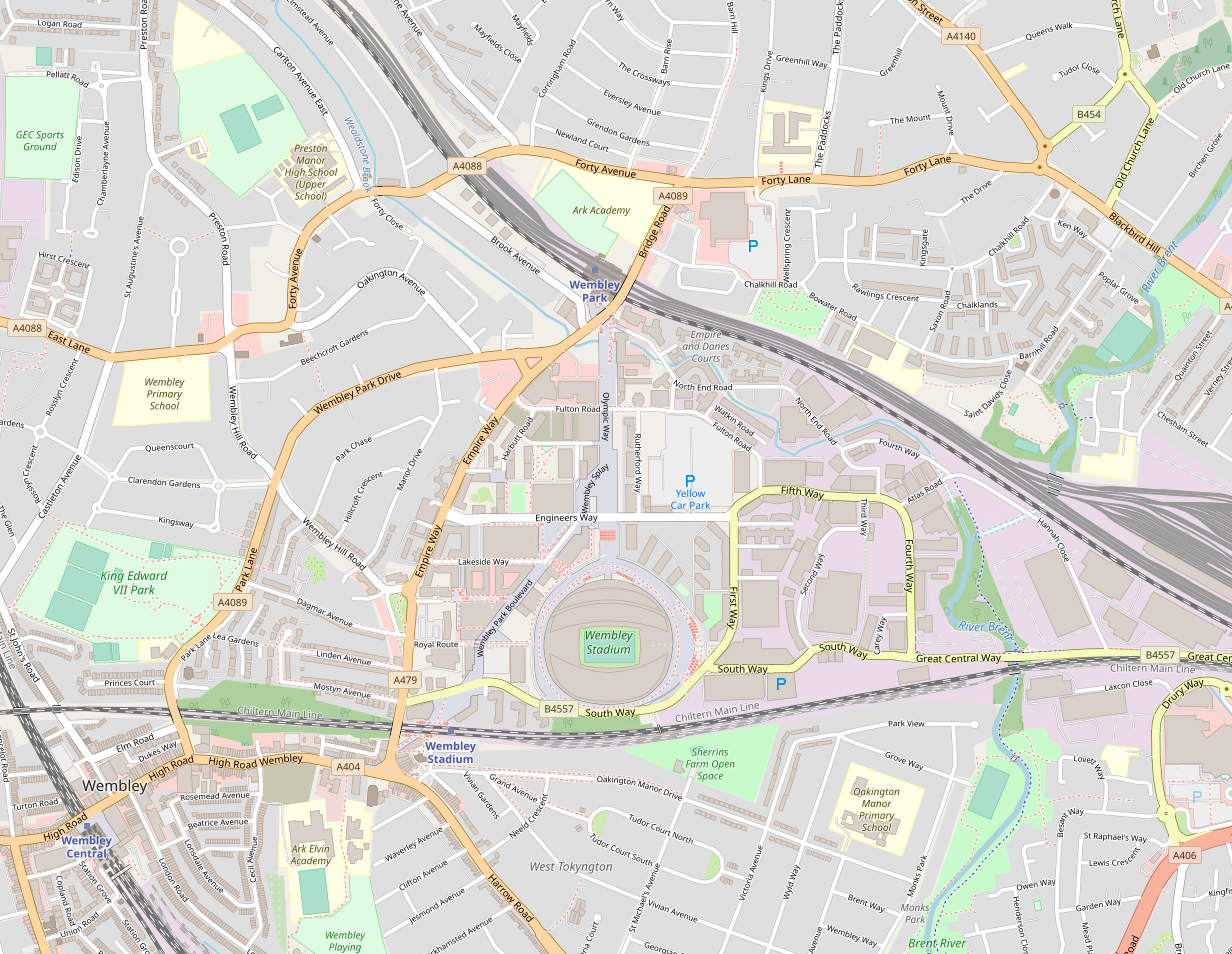
A map of Wembley Stadium in relation to Olympic Way, Wembley Central, Wembley Stadium and Wembley Park stations, and the A406 North Circular road (bottom right)

Multiple London Buses routes serve the station.
