= New Strand Shopping Centre =

Shopping centre in Bootle, Merseyside, England

- Location: Bootle, Merseyside, England
- Coordinates: 53.4519°N 2.9925°W
- Opened: 4 October 1968; 58 years ago
- Manager: Bob Greenhalgh - Centre Manager
- Owner: Sefton Council
- Num. of stores: 130
- Num. of anchor tenants: 5
- Floor area: 407,000 sq ft (38,000 m^{2})
- Floors: 2
- Parking: 500+
- Website: strandshoppingcentre.com

The New Strand Shopping Centre, known locally simply as The Strand, is the main shopping centre in Bootle, Merseyside, England. Opened in 1968, it was part of a larger Bootle redevelopment during this period, which was also complemented by the establishment of the Girobank headquarters in nearby Netherton. The site occupied by the shopping centre was formerly Victorian houses, in streets that were named after American states. The shopping centre's name was chosen through a public competition, with an 11-year-old school girl submitting the winning entry of "New Strand" in 1965. The Strand opened at a cost of £5 million in 1968, in the centenary year of Bootle receiving its municipal charter.

The centre was extended between 1997 and 1998 and completed in November the same year to provide additional retail outlets, as well as additional car-parking facilities and improved transportation to the centre. The centre was the site of the 1993 abduction of toddler James Bulger, who was taken from the centre by two ten-year-old boys and later murdered.

In October 2014, it was announced that London-based Ellandi had purchased the shopping centre, yet it was sold to Sefton Council just two and a half years later. In 2025, the council approved the first phase of a £20 million regeneration for the shopping centre, to incorporate new community spaces following partial demolition.

== History ==
=== Planning ===
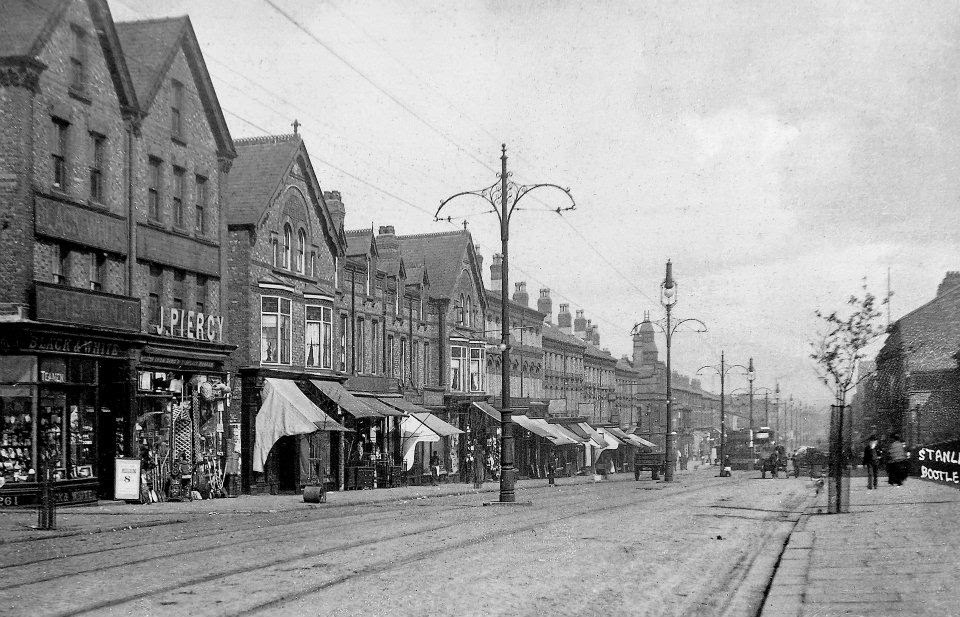
Stanley Road around 1905, with the shops that would later be demolished

During the 1960s, Bootle underwent a major regeneration, with the shopping centre expected to be a highlight of the redevelopment efforts. In October 1961, the town's development plan was approved, and the council granted permission for the compulsory purchase of property on Stanley Road. The council had previously appointed shopping consultants in 1956 to advise on the necessary improvements, with a particular focus on the Strand Road-Stanley Road area. The consultants found that facilities were "inadequate," with a danger to pedestrians and insufficient parking available. The area identified for redevelopment was already part of a slum clearance program. Despite considering other sites, the Stanley Road-Strand Road location was ultimately chosen due to its significant redevelopment needs and its potential to create a new retail shopping centre strategically located near a railway station and easily accessible to the wider Merseyside region. Mr T. H. Pigot of the Bootle No 1 Objectors Association believed that Linacre Lane would have been a more suitable location, but accepted that transport connections in the region were inadequate.

==== Public inquiry ====
Due to the need to compulsory purchase existing property, a public inquiry was held in 1962 by Mr M. B. Tetlow for the Ministry of Housing and Local Government. At the second day of the inquiry, William Roots MP noted that the shopping district present on Stanley Road did not meet modern standards, as the area's shops were primarily old property conversions that had failed to keep up with the times. The Bootle Traders' Association expressed concerns that the higher rents charged in the new centre could "squeeze the smaller trader against the wall," causing instability to existing smaller traders and the risk of liquidation. A Bootle estate agent and surveyor told the inquiry that the main shopping region of the area should be improved rather than redeveloped, citing concerns over rent costs which in the proposed shopping centre "would be more than double the existing rents for property in the area", expressing concerns this could drive away local traders in favour of national chains.

==== Land acquisition ====
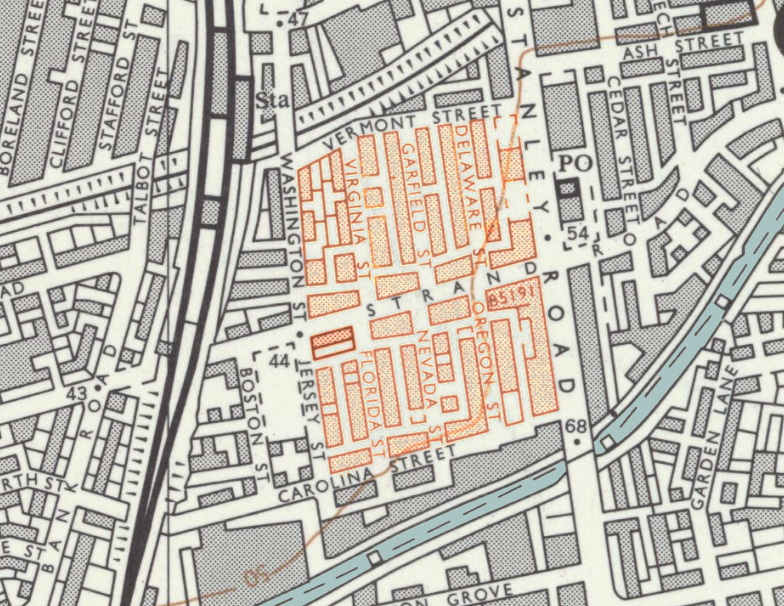
Map of the area now occupied by New Strand Shopping Centre before construction, c1965

Approval for the scheme was expected imminently during a press conference in November 1963. However, town planning modifications were needed to remove the provision of housing on the land designated for the new shopping centre and business units to repurpose the land for general business. Provisions were also considered to allow for the widening of Stanley Road. The site chosen for the shopping centre was occupied by streets of Victorian terraced housing, informally known as "Little America," as the streets were named after American states. The new shopping centre would cover 35 acres (14 ha) of land, then occupied by around 148 shops and 441 houses. However, the demolition plans were criticized during the inquiry, which considered a view that only 28 of the 441 homes were unfit and that many other houses elsewhere should have been a demolition priority.

=== Construction ===
Construction work started in 1965, with demolition of existing residential dwellings starting sometime around July that year. The first phase of construction involved the laying of a new £55,000 sewer from April that year. Support piles were laid from September 1965, with expectations that the first shops would be open in time for Christmas 1966. Full completion was expected to be in 1968, the centenary year of Bootle receiving its municipal charter. In November 1966, building work was delayed by around five weeks following strike action of builders employed by William Thornton and Sons, the main contractors. Work resumed in December 1966.

By March 1967, construction work was described as "proceeding rapidly", with lettings of shops progressing well. There had been prior concerns expressed that the centre could end up being a white elephant, although the council were happy with the progress being made. Bootle Corporation and developer Ravenseft Properties Limited held a competition to find the best six names for new planned pedestrian ways, with a £25 prize for the winner. The winning name was announced in March 1965, with the entry "New Strand" by 11-year-old Dorothy Hawkins winning first prize, while "Stanley Mons Strand" and "Little America" won the consolation prizes.

Original plans included a further development stage which would have provided a high level approach to the centre from the New Strand railway station platform, but this did not materialise. The car parking facilities, provided in the form of a multi-storey car park, were described as being "on a scale unknown on Merseyside". The centre was originally designed almost entirely as concrete, with canopies from the shops that left areas of the walkway exposed to the elements. Originally, the main entrance was to be the Hexagon on Washington Parade, however when a grander plan to pedestrianise Stanley Road failed to materialise, the Stanley Road entrance became the primary entry point, leaving the shopping centre "somewhat back to front". Arches would later be added to the Stanley Road end in an attempt to reverse the polarity.

=== Opening ===
The Strand opened on 4 October 1968 by Mayor of Bootle, Alderman Oliver Ellis as part of a larger Bootle redevelopment during this period, having previously been streets of housing. Developers of the £5 million (equivalent to £99,285,700 in 2024) centre, Ravenseft Properties, anticipated that the centre would transform Bootle into "one of the most dynamic areas of the North West".

The precinct was designed by T. P. Bennett with attention to detail that made "clear that it is a showpiece of a self-confident town". Over the main entrance was a ridged tent-like roof which was described as being among Bootle's "most prominent landmarks", while the entrance hall was compared to being like the entrance of "a ballroom or opera house". Many of the new shops had previously held premises on Stanley Road and proudly proclaimed in the window of their former premises that "we have moved to the New Strand". On opening day, there were over 60 shops open, among them larger stores that may have otherwise not come to Bootle without the lure of the new shopping centre. Among the original opening stores were TJ Hughes, which occupied a retail space of around 14,000 square feet across three floors.

=== Operation ===
The centre received a significant revamp in 1988, which included a roof over the lower palatine, a pram ramp and an extension to the balcony for residential tenants. Support for the balcony extension was mixed, with around as many in opposition as there were in support. The planning committee approved the plans in October 1987, having previously rejected an earlier application by Ravenseft Properties Limited in August 1987 on the grounds that the plans would be "detrimental to the visual amenity of the Palatine residents". Many shopkeepers petitioned in favour of the plans, noting that the redevelopment proposal would modernise the centre, making it more attractive and offering protection to shoppers during bad weather. The refurbishment was overseen by the manager Peter Williams, who oversaw a transition into something "approximating the American mall, with the primary objectives being to "create an ambience of comfort and security", with aluminium planking covering the concrete walls and Italian ceramic tiles and granite replacing the old flooring. The relaunch of the centre came in autumn 1989, with live entertainment and performances as part of a "Grand Opening Extravaganza". By this time, there were 114 shops in the centre, of which the anchor stores were Marks & Spencer, TJ Hughes and Woolworths. Footfall was estimated at 120,000 a week.

On 12 February 1993, the New Strand Shopping Centre came to attention when two-year-old James Bulger was abducted from the shopping centre and murdered by two 10-year-old minors, Jon Venables and Robert Thompson. The Strand Creche was conceived in the wake of the abduction, funded mostly from donations and parents paying £1.60 per hour, per child. Running at a cost of £53,000 per year by 1999 and supported by four staff, the creche faced closure in May 1999 until an anonymous donation of £10,000 was received which, coupled with other fund raising initiatives, was expected to keep the creche running for the following year.

In 1997–1998, the centre underwent major redevelopment and expansion, conceived in response to the shortage of larger sized units in Bootle. The redevelopment project consisted of a 100,000 square feet (9,300 m^{2}) expansion to the existing shopping centre mall, providing new floor space to a host of new retailers, whilst also providing a direct link into a new bus station and transport interchange for Merseyrail, all being completed in November 1998. Additional parking facilities were provided in the form of a new multi-storey carpark which complements the existing multi story carpark adjacent.

=== 2000s onwards ===
==== Ellandi acquisition ====
The centre was purchased by London-based Ellandi in 2014, who announced plans to update the signage, improve accessibility and bring in new retailers. Under their ownership, the return of anchor tenant TJ Hughes was announced, as well as a vacancy rate decrease to less than 10%, with a footfall increase of 14% each year.

==== Council ownership ====
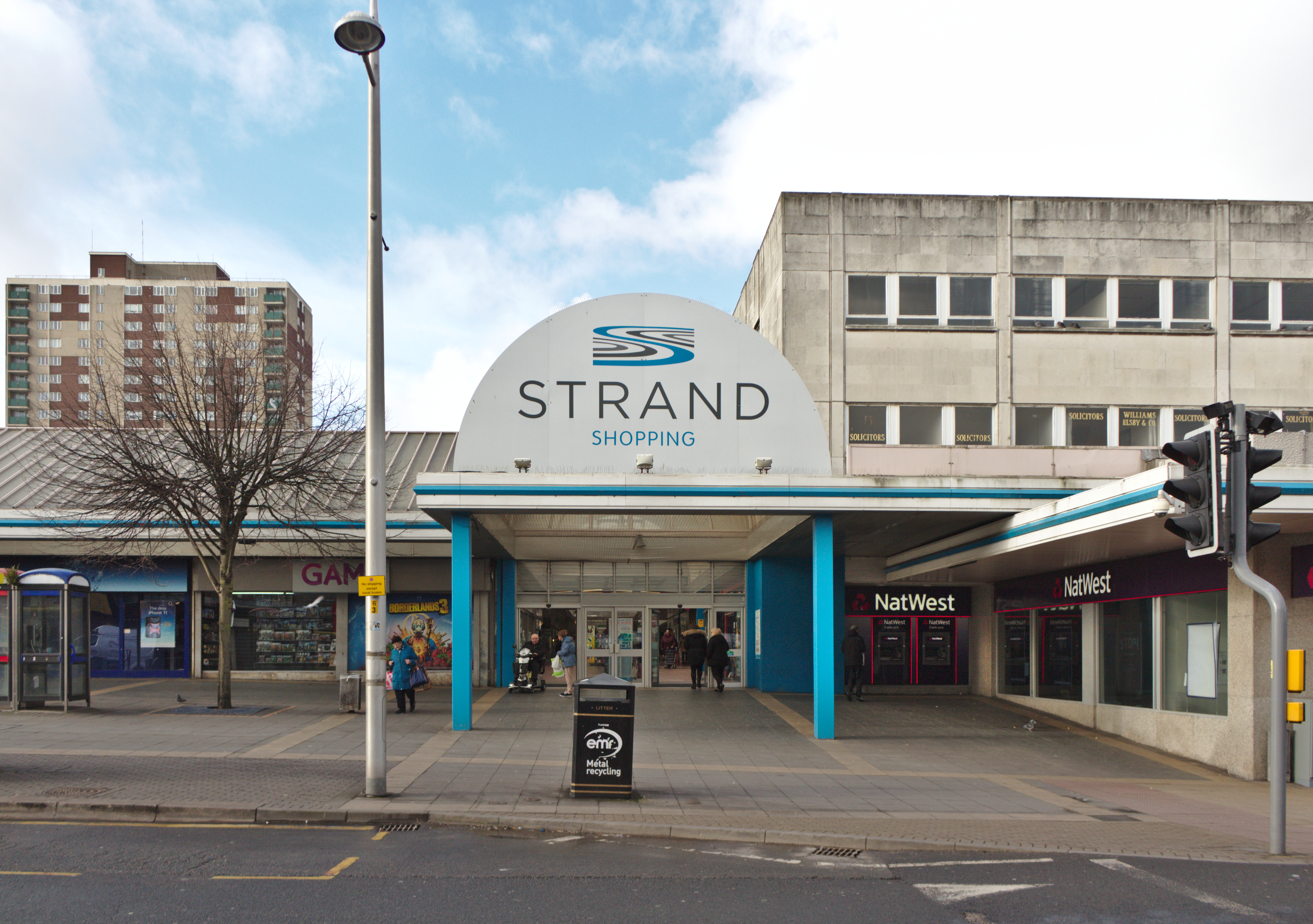
One of the main front entrances from Stanley Road

Ellandi sold the shopping centre in 2017 to Sefton Council for £32.5m, who cited the desire to protect local jobs and assist towards a wider region regeneration, as well as to generate a stable income for the council. The council spent almost £700,000 on legal advice for the purchase of the shopping centre. An estimated 118,000 shoppers visited the centre weekly in 2017. Despite the sale, Ellandi will continue to manage the shopping centre, whilst working alongside Sefton Council to deliver their regeneration strategy.

During the COVID-19 pandemic, the centre lost around £2.7 million up to March 2021, although this was at the lower end of estimates which predicted potential losses of over £3 million. It was the first year since the acquisition by the council in 2017 that the centre had lost money, primarily due to lockdown measures preventing shops from opening. In the year prior to the pandemic, the centre made just £30,000 in profit. In September 2021, Sefton Council leader Ian Maher advised that the value of the shopping centre had fallen to less than £15 million.

In January 2025, the council's planning committee approved the first phase of a £20 million regeneration plan for the shopping centre, to include new green and community spaces. This followed preparatory work commencing in September 2024 for a partial demolition of the centre to facilitate the regeneration. Demolition works began on the site in June 2025. The redevelopment phase is expected to be completed in autumn 2027.

== Stores ==
Stores in the shopping centre include TJ Hughes, Home Bargains, New Look, Iceland, B&M and JD Sports. TJ Hughes is the centre's largest tenant since returning to bigger premises in October 2015, having previously closed in 2011.

== Transport links ==
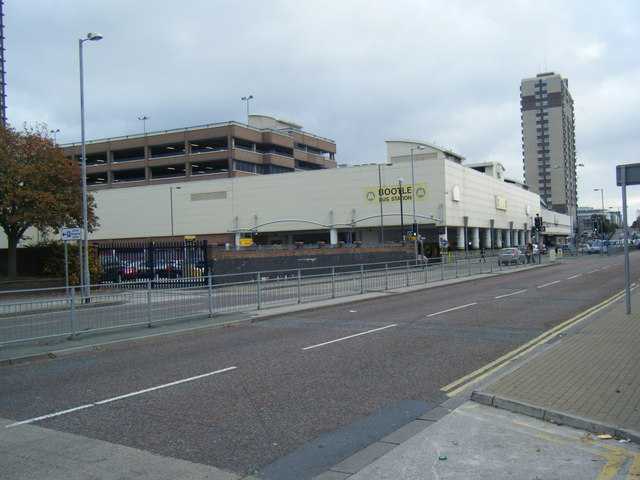
Bootle Bus Station, with the Strand Shopping Centre car park behind

It is served by the Bootle New Strand railway station running on the Northern Line, with trains running to Southport and Liverpool city centre. The station was renamed from Marsh Lane in honour of the new shopping centre development. Bus links to the Strand became much improved following the extension which took place during 1999, which included a new bus terminal amongst other extensions to the main building.

== Awards ==
The shopping centre has won a Home Office award for its efforts in tackling crime, with just a handful of other towns and cities in the North West of England gaining the honour. Following a fall in crime rates to become one of the lowest in the region, it was granted a Safer Business Award.
