= 1986 Miamisburg train derailment =

1986 disaster in Ohio

Coordinates: 39.65105897°N 84.28854055°W

At 4:25 pm on July 8, 1986, a 44 car Baltimore and Ohio railroad freight train, traveling at 45 miles per hour, bound south to Cincinnati, derailed near Miamisburg, Ohio, a small city with an industrial history in Montgomery County, southwest of Dayton. Fifteen of the cars derailed on a bridge; these were tank cars containing yellow phosphorus, molten sulfur and tallow. Carrying a chemical used to make rat poison, fireworks and luminescent coatings, one tank car caught fire. This resulted in emission of an estimated 1,000 foot (300 m) high cloud of phosphorus. A subsequent incident caused the largest train accident-triggered evacuation at the time in the United States. The accident was the second major rail disaster in Miamisburg within an eight-year period. On September 10, 1978, 15 cars of a Conrail train derailed.

== Initial response and evacuation ==
At 7:00 pm city manager Dennis Kissinger declared a state of emergency. Approximately 17,500 people were evacuated from Miamisburg and other Montgomery County locales, including West Carrollton, Moraine and Jefferson Township. Seven hospitals in the area treated approximately 140 people for minor injuries such as eye, lung and skin irritation.

Ron Parker, the city director of development said that the fire department indicated that the fire from the tankcar with the phosphorus was extinguished shortly after 10:00 pm. However, he said that three other freight cars were continuing to burn. The first of the evacuees returned to Moraine beginning at 10:00 pm that same evening.

Governor Dick Celeste came to Miamisburg that evening to speak with area officials.

== Second rupture and evacuation ==
By the following night, Wednesday, July 9, residents returned home. Firefighters continued their efforts to end the fires. A portion of the bridge broke, a car shifted, was punctured, and again phosphorus was ignited, sending out more smoke. The Associated Press reported that in a few hours 25,000 to 40,000 people evacuated from the vicinity in a second evacuation, at that time, the largest evacuation in U.S. history from a train accident according to William E. Loftus, executive director of the Federal Railroad Administration. People were evacuated from all of Miamisburg, parts of West Carrolton, Moraine, Miami Township, Germantown, German Township and Washington Township. This was also the largest evacuation in Ohio history.

Initially attempts were made to use the University of Dayton Arena, however, it did not have sufficient air conditioning. Evacuees were sheltered at various schools and the Dayton Convention Center.

In the coming days, the area was split into different zones, varying by danger: a Caution Zone, an Irritant Zone and a Restricted Zone. Residents were allowed to go to the first two zones; access to the third zone was prohibited without authorization.

By July 10, winds were no longer blowing dangerous substances and people were allowed to return to their homes, with the exception of two square miles in Miamisburg. The 300 families were restricted from that section, many housed at the city's high school.

Parker said that while the fire was burning the city would try to dam Bear Creek in order to prevent the chemicals from spreading to the Great Miami River, a major source of drinking water.

Firefighters from Dayton Fire Department, along with those from Miamisburg, Miami and Washington Townships for the fire for five days, around the clock. Owing to the risk of eye irritation firefighters in teams of 15 firefighters alternating their active firefighting.

Throughout the period, in spite of efforts of firefighters, the fire at the accident site burned for days. The fire was not completely exhausted until July 12.

== Responses ==
Senators John Glenn (Dem.) and Howard Metzenbaum (Dem.) asked president Ronald Reagan to order an investigation as to the accident's cause and the nation's policy for transporting hazardous substances.

Gov. Celeste created the Ohio Hazardous Substance Emergency Team (OHSET) to investigate the derailment and to provide recommendations for improving protection of Ohio's citizens from threats from hazardous substances. On the conclusion of OHSET's investigation, on September 29, 1986, OHSET recommended the passing of legislation to fill in existing gaps in current regulations. The Cincinnati City Council on June 3, 1987, issued a resolution, stating it "urges the 117th General Assembly to enact H.R. 428, regulating the transportation of hazardous substances by truck and rail in Ohio, by requiring data concerning the specific nature of transported hazardous substances, prenotification of their transportation, advance route assessment, and providing for training for proper handling of said substance."

Several class action lawsuits were filed. Already by July 10, a $200 million class action lawsuit was filed for four individuals. Eventually, in total, $450 million ($1,229,465,700 in 2023) in lawsuits were filed.

== See also ==
- List of American railroad accidents
- List of rail accidents (1980-1989)
- East Palestine train derailment (2023), a Norfolk Southern derailment of several tank cars carrying hazardous chemicals; subsequently a controlled burn of several cars was ordered to prevent multiple explosions
- Farragut derailment (2002), a Norfolk Southern derailment which caused release of hazardous chemicals
- Graniteville train crash (2005), two Norfolk Southern freight trains collided, releasing toxic chlorine gas which killed 10 and injured 250 others
- Hazardous Materials Transportation Act
- Lac-Mégantic rail disaster (2013), a MMA Railway freight train carrying crude oil derailed, resulting in an explosion which killed 47
- Mississauga train derailment (1979), a CP Rail freight train derailed, releasing hazardous chemicals
- Nemadji River train derailment (1992), a Burlington Northern freight train derailed, releasing nearly 22,000 gallons of liquid benzene into the Nemadji River and toxic emissions into the air
- Weyauwega, Wisconsin, derailment (1996), a Wisconsin Central Ltd. freight train derailed, releasing hazardous chemicals
