= Póvoa de Santa Iria train collision =

1986 railway accident in Póvoa de Santa Iria, Portugal

- Location within Portugal

Details
- Date: 5 May 1986; Between 12:00 and 12:15 WEST (UTC+01:00)
- Location: Póvoa de Santa Iria, Vila Franca de Xira, Lisbon
- Coordinates: 38°51′33″N 9°03′51″W
- Country: Portugal
- Line: Linha do Norte
- Operator: Caminhos-de-Ferro Portugueses
- Incident type: Collision

Statistics
- Trains: 2
- Deaths: 17
- Injured: 83

The Póvoa de Santa Iria train collision was a rail transport accident that occurred in the train station of Póvoa de Santa Iria, Portugal, on 5 May 1986. It caused the death of 17 people and left 83 others injured. It is considered one of the worst rail accidents that ever happened in Portugal.

The accident involved a speeding express train and a local train stopped at the train station in Póvoa de Santa Iria. Due to human error, the express train entered the station inadvertently at high speed and collided with the rear of the local train, crumpling two carriages of the local train. The train station also suffered damage.

== Background ==
The Póvoa train station serves the city of Póvoa de Santa Iria, a suburb in the north of Lisbon, and is part of the North Line (Linha do Norte), a railway line which connects Lisbon to Porto. The railway is used by express and local train services, although the Póvoa station is a stop for local trains only.

== Collision ==
On 5 May 1986, an express train departed from Covilhã at 6:15, bound for Lisbon. Later that morning, a local train (known at the time as a tranvia train) departed from Carregado, also bound for Lisbon. The local train was mostly occupied by commuting students headed to Lisbon.

The local train entered and stopped in the Póvoa train station. Following it in the same rail line, the express train from Covilhã traveled at 110 km/h. It did not stop at a red signal 2 km from the Póvoa station and continued its way into the station.

Minutes after noon, the express train collided with the rear of the local train that was stopped at the Póvoa station. The impact was so powerful that the front of the express train climbed the rear of the parked local train. Two of the local train carriages were crumpled and a concrete platform shelter was toppled, killing two persons in the station. João Farinha, the driver of the express train, escaped by fleeing into the back of his locomotive.

== Aftermath ==
=== Rescue operations ===
Around 250 firefighters from more than 30 firefighters corps from the region were involved in the rescue searches. The injured were taken to the hospitals of Vila Franca de Xira, São José and Santa Maria.

The President of Portugal Mário Soares visited the site of the accident hours after the collision, while rescue searches were ongoing.

=== Investigation ===
Following the accident, Caminhos de Ferro Portugueses (CP) formed an inquiry committee with the task of investigating the cause of the train collision. On 28 May 1986, the CP inquiry committee released an official statement, concluding that the machinist and the driver of the express train disrespected the signalization that indicated them to stop and did not fully halt the train. Both were suspended immediately after the accident.

== See also ==
- List of rail accidents (1980–89)
