= 1988 Shanghai–Hangzhou railway collision =

Railway accident in Shanghai, China

Details
- Date: 24 March 1988, 14:19
- Location: Outside Kuangxiang railway station, Fengbang Town, Jiading District, Shanghai, China
- Coordinates: 31°16′33″N 121°19′46″E
- Line: Shanghai–Hangzhou railway (outer loop section, now part of the Shanghai–Kunming railway)
- Incident type: Head-on collision
- Cause: Driver and assistant driver of Train 311 violated operating rules and misread signals

Statistics
- Trains: Train 311 (downbound, Nanjing West → Hangzhou); Train 208 (upbound, Changsha → Shanghai) operated as Z245/248 and Z247/246
- Deaths: 29
- Injured: 99

The 1988 Shanghai–Hangzhou railway collision (Japanese: 上海列車事故) was a head-on collision between two passenger trains that occurred at around 14:19 on 24 March 1988 on the Shanghai–Hangzhou railway outer loop line in Fengbang Township (now Jiangqiao Town, Jiading District), Jiading District, Shanghai, China.

The accident occurred near Kuangxiang railway station, when Train 311, operating from Nanjing West railway station to Hangzhou railway station, passed a scheduled stop after its crew seriously violated operating regulations and misread signals. The train overran a departure signal at danger, damaged a set of points (switches), and entered the main line, where it collided head-on with Train 208, operating from Changsha railway station to Shanghai railway station.

The collision resulted in 29 deaths, 20 serious injuries, and 79 minor injuries. Two locomotives were heavily damaged, four passenger carriages were written off, two were severely damaged, and one was moderately damaged. Railway traffic on the Shanghai–Hangzhou railway was suspended for 23 hours and 7 minutes.

Among the passengers on Train 311 was a Japanese school excursion group from Kōchi Prefecture, Japan. The group suffered 28 deaths, 9 serious injuries, and 28 minor injuries, making the accident the railway disaster in Chinese history with the highest number of foreign casualties involving a school excursion group.

== Background ==
=== Route ===
The accident occurred on the outer loop line of the Shanghai–Hangzhou railway. The line originated from Shanghai railway station and ran westward via Shanghai West railway station along the southern side of the Nanxiang marshalling yard, before connecting to the Fengbang section of the outer loop network. The outer loop alignment formed part of a capacity expansion project designed to bypass heavily congested urban level crossings in Shanghai's inner railway network, which had suffered from severe congestion and limited capacity. The Shanghai–Hangzhou railway is a major railway corridor in eastern China linking Shanghai and Hangzhou and forms part of the broader Shanghai–Kunming railway network. The section passing through Zhenru and Nanxiang was developed to alleviate pressure on the original Shanghai inner loop railway. Construction of the Nanxin loop line began on 2 May 1986 and it was opened on 29 December 1986, at which time Kuangxiang station was also commissioned. On 14 January 1987, 40 passenger services on the Shanghai–Hangzhou route were rerouted from the inner loop line to the outer loop line, and the double-track expansion of the Zhenru–Fengbang section began in 1990.

=== Accident trains ===
Train 311, involved in the accident, was a passenger service running from Nanjing West railway station to Hangzhou railway station via the Shanghai–Nanjing railway and the Shanghai–Hangzhou railway. The train reversed direction at Shanghai West railway station and was scheduled to depart at 14:07. It was timetabled to enter Kuangxiang station at 14:18, where it was planned to stop for 8 minutes to allow Train 208 to pass.

Train 208 was a passenger service operating from Changsha railway station to Shanghai railway station. It was scheduled to depart Fengbang station at 14:13 and to pass through Kuangxiang station at 14:22.

=== School excursion group ===
The passengers on Train 311 included a Japanese school excursion group organised by the Japan Travel Bureau (JTB Corporation), consisting of 179 first-year students from Kochi Gakugei High School, as well as 14 accompanying staff including teachers, a physician, and JTB tour guides. The group, totalling 193 people, departed on the evening of 21 March 1988 from Kochi Port by ferry, arriving the following morning at Port of Osaka. They then travelled by commercial flight from Osaka International Airport (Itami Airport) to Shanghai Hongqiao International Airport, before continuing by train from Shanghai railway station to Suzhou railway station. After spending 23 March sightseeing in Suzhou, the group boarded Train 311 on 24 March for travel to Hangzhou railway station, with arrival scheduled for the evening of the same day.

== Accident ==
=== Incident ===
On the day of the accident, Train 311 departed on schedule from Nanjing West railway station and later stopped at Suzhou railway station, where three soft-seat coaches were attached at the rear to accommodate a Japanese school excursion group of 193 passengers from Kochi Gakugei High School travelling to Hangzhou railway station.

At 13:40, Train 311 arrived at Zhenru railway station, where it was turned and underwent a locomotive change. At 13:50, the original locomotive was replaced by ND2 class diesel locomotive No. 0190 from Hangzhou Locomotive Depot, operated by driver Zhou Xiaoniu and assistant driver Liu Guolong. The three attached coaches became vehicles 1–3 behind the locomotive.

At 14:07, Train 311 departed Zhenru station on schedule. It was required to stop for 8 minutes at Kuangxiang station to allow Train 208, operating from Changsha railway station to Shanghai railway station, to pass.At the time, the distant signal at Kuangxiang station displayed green, and the home signal displayed double yellow. However, the locomotive crew failed to conduct a proper brake test before entering the station, did not respond to safety call-and-response procedures, and had the radio communication system switched off. No braking action was taken upon passing the station entrance signals.

A station assistant on duty, observing the high speed and lack of braking, immediately displayed a red flag stop signal. The station dispatcher also attempted to contact both Train 311 and Train 208 via radio to initiate emergency braking, but Train 311 could not receive instructions due to the switched-off communication system. After noticing the stop signal, the conductor applied the emergency brake, but the train continued at approximately 45 km/h. The locomotive crew only applied emergency braking upon noticing a red exit signal, but braking distance was insufficient. Train 311 overran the signal, broke through a set of points, and entered the main line. At 14:19, Train 311 collided head-on with Train 208.

Following the impact, the baggage car of Train 208 was thrown onto its locomotive ND2 No. 0272. The second soft-seat coach of Train 311 was severely compressed, with its rear portion forced under the first soft-seat coach. Apart from the baggage car of Train 208 and two soft-seat coaches of Train 311, the second vehicle behind the locomotive of Train 208, a hard sleeper coach, was destroyed. In total, two additional passenger coaches were severely damaged and one was moderately damaged. Approximately 50 metres of track were damaged, including 46 sleepers and one switch rail, resulting in the suspension of mainline operations for 23 hours and 7 minutes.

=== Casualties ===
As of 25 March, a total of 28 people were confirmed killed in the accident, including 27 passengers from Train 311 and one railway employee, Jiang Yicheng, a train inspector from the China Railway Guangzhou Group associated with Train 208.

Among the fatalities, 27 victims died instantly from severe chest and abdominal compression injuries or traumatic brain injuries, while one additional victim died later after unsuccessful medical treatment. A further Japanese student, Hirata Hironori, died after being repatriated to Japan. The Japanese victims included the group leader, Tetsuo Kendo, a physical education instructor and kendo teacher at Kochi Gakugei High School, as well as 27 first-year high school students (17 male and 10 female).

Between the two trains involved, casualties were relatively lower on Train 208, as its baggage car was positioned directly behind the locomotive. The most severe losses occurred in the second soft-seat coach behind the locomotive of Train 311, which sustained the heaviest impact and suffered the highest number of casualties.

== Investigation ==
On 25 March 1988, the State Council of the People's Republic of China established a joint accident response and relief leadership group composed of officials from the Shanghai Municipal People's Government, the Ministry of Railways of the People's Republic of China, the Ministry of Foreign Affairs of the People's Republic of China, and other relevant departments. At the same time, an investigation team was formed by the national safety authority in cooperation with supervisory and public security agencies, including the Ministry of Public Security of the People's Republic of China.

Shortly after the accident, a spokesperson of the Shanghai Railway Bureau stated that the cause might have been brake failure on Train 311. However, subsequent investigations concluded that the braking system of Train 311 was functioning normally. Investigators from the Japan Overseas Railway Technical Association, including analyst Yamada Naonori, stated that safety facilities on the siding and station approach at Kuangxiang railway station were insufficient. Kenichi Matsumoto, editor-in-chief of the Japanese railway magazine *Monthly Railfan*, argued that Chinese passenger rolling stock design at the time lacked adequate crashworthiness protection.

On 5 April 1988, the investigation team of the National Safety Production Committee concluded that the accident was caused by the Train 311 driver's violation of operating rules, and classified the incident as a major railway operational responsibility accident. According to a report on the trial of the 324 Railway Accident case published on 22 September 1988, the locomotive crew of Train 311, Zhou Xiaoniu and Liu Guolong, were distracted and negligent while on duty. They violated regulations governing railway locomotive operations and technical management by failing to maintain a proper lookout and apply braking measures in a timely manner. They also unauthorizedly switched off the cab radio telephone, resulting in insufficient braking distance and ultimately contributing to the collision.

Subsequent investigations found that Zhou and Liu had neglected their duties during operation. They failed to keep a proper lookout, did not verify the departure signal, and failed to comply with the mandatory call-and-response operating procedures. However, the complete investigation report has not been publicly released.

In addition to the negligence and operational violations committed by the locomotive crew of Train 311, another contributing factor was improper dispatching procedures at Fengbang station. Train 208 was scheduled to depart Fengbang station at 14:13, but station personnel failed to adhere to the timetable and authorized its departure two minutes early, at 14:11, on the day of the accident. After departing, Train 208 approached Kuangxiang station and observed a green distant signal, while both the cab signal and home signal displayed a single yellow aspect. As the train neared the up-line home signal at Kuangxiang station, its locomotive crew suddenly observed Train 311 crossing the turnout ahead and saw the home signal change to red. The crew immediately initiated emergency braking, but were unable to prevent a collision with the oncoming Train 311.

== Rescue efforts ==
After the collision, factory workers and farmers near Kuangxiang railway station were the first to report the accident to the Public Security Bureau and health authorities. A train conductor also reported the incident to the Shanghai Railway Bureau via a nearby dispatch telephone. Local fire units from Shanghai arrived at the scene at about 14:30. Medical teams from nearby institutions such as Nanxiang Hospital and the Fengbang Township Health Center were dispatched immediately.

A larger rescue force was then mobilized, including over 100 medical staff from Shanghai hospitals, 38 ambulances, 30 traffic police command vehicles, and 19 fire engines. Units of the People's Liberation Army stationed in Shanghai also participated in the rescue operation. Journalist Tong Chanfu, traveling on Train 208, also joined the rescue efforts and assisted firefighters in transporting injured passengers. . Local residents took part in the rescue, but the area was later sealed off by the People's Armed Police due to crowding The site, located in a suburban area more than 10 km from central Shanghai, was further affected by rain and heavy fog in the evening, complicating rescue operations.

Because the first and second carriages had been severely crushed in the collision, rescue workers were forced to climb onto the roofs of the damaged cars and cut through them using oxy-fuel cutting equipment. They then entered the carriages through the openings and evacuated the injured passengers to temporary first-aid stations established at the accident site for emergency treatment.Following initial treatment, the injured were transported to local hospitals for further medical care. Severely injured victims were treated jointly by medical teams dispatched from Shanghai and staff at local hospitals. Once their conditions had stabilized, they were transferred by the medical teams to their respective hospitals for continued treatment.Rescue operations at the scene continued for 11 hours.

At the time of the accident, the then Director of the Shanghai Railway Bureau, Han Zhubin, together with officials from the Shanghai Railway Public Security Bureau and the Shanghai Railway Sub-bureau, visited the accident site in the afternoon of the incident day. Shanghai Municipal Party Committee Deputy Secretary and Vice Mayor Huang Ju also arrived at the scene that afternoon. On the evening of 24 March, a rescue command headquarters was established under the command of then Vice Minister of the Ministry of Railways of the People's Republic of China, Li Senmao, which made emergency arrangements for the rescue operations. Prior to this, on-site rescue efforts had been directly coordinated by a leadership group from the Shanghai Municipal Health Bureau. During the rescue operation, the Shanghai Blood Center provided more than 60,000 millilitres of blood.

The accident scene was largely cleared by 04:00 on 25 March, and services on the Shanghai–Hangzhou railway resumed at noon the same day. The injured Japanese passengers were transferred on 25 March to major hospitals in central Shanghai, including Shanghai First People's Hospital, Shanghai Changzheng Hospital, Zhongshan Hospital of Fudan University, Huadong Hospital, and Huashan Hospital, for continued treatment. The 129 uninjured students and teachers of the tour group, along with 12 lightly injured students, returned to Japan by aircraft on the evening of 25 March. The bodies of the deceased were gradually transported to the Longhua Funeral Parlor after 16:30 on 25 March, and three of them were cremated on 26 March. On the morning of 27 March, 134 injured Japanese students and family members of the deceased and injured victims returned to Japan aboard a chartered flight. The coffins of 24 Japanese victims and the ashes of three others were transported on the same flight. At that time, 14 family members and 11 injured passengers (including five seriously injured cases) remained in Shanghai; all remaining injured persons had returned to Japan by 3 April.

== Aftercare ==
On March 25, Zhu Qizhen, Vice Minister of the Ministry of Foreign Affairs of the People's Republic of China, traveled to Shanghai. Entrusted by Acting Premier Li Peng, Chen Junsheng, Secretary-General of the State Council of the People's Republic of China, Ye Qing, deputy director of the State Economic Commission of the People's Republic of China, and six other officials arrived in Shanghai on the morning of March 26 to handle the aftermath of the March 24, 1988 Shanghai train collision.

=== Compensation ===
Shortly after the accident, China and Japan established compensation negotiation teams. The Chinese delegation was headed by Kong Lingran, deputy director of the Shanghai Railway Bureau,while the Japanese delegation was led by Isao Okamura, who had stepped down as Vice President of the Japan Federation of Bar Associations on March 31, 1988, and subsequently served as executive director of the Japan-China Lawyers Exchange Association and head of the advisory legal team in April. From May 11 to 17, 1988, a Shanghai train accident condolence delegation consisting of eight members, including Han Zhubin, Director of the Shanghai Railway Bureau, Yu Pengnian, deputy director of the Shanghai Foreign Affairs Office, and Wang Daomin, Director of the Shanghai Municipal Health Bureau, visited Japan to express condolences to the families of the victims and injured students. The first round of compensation negotiations was held in Tokyo on June 18–19, 1988, and the second round took place in Shanghai on July 29–30. The compensation amount proposed by the Chinese side differed substantially from the demands made by the Japanese side. As the two parties could not agree on a permanent negotiation venue, subsequent rounds of talks alternated between Tokyo and Shanghai.

After eight rounds of negotiations, Chinese and Japanese representatives signed the Shanghai Railway Accident Compensation Agreement in Kōchi, Japan, on 11 March 1989. Under the agreement, the Shanghai Railway Administration paid compensation of ¥4.5 million to the family of each Japanese victim who died in the collision (approximately US$33,000 at the time), while lump-sum compensation payments were also provided to 36 Japanese nationals who were injured. In addition, the Japanese government, insurance companies, educational institutions, and other organizations provided supplementary compensation, bringing the total compensation received by each bereaved family to approximately ¥48.5 million.

On 22 February 1989, some of the victims' families filed a lawsuit with the Kochi District Court, alleging that Kochi Gakugei High School had failed to take adequate safety precautions and had therefore committed gross negligence. The plaintiffs sought ¥253 million in damages from both the school and its principal, Shōtarō Sano. The original lawsuit was brought by six bereaved families, although three later reached settlements with the school.On 17 October 1994, the Kochi District Court ruled that the school's pre-trip investigation had been "extremely inadequate". However, it held that the accident had not been reasonably foreseeable and that the school's failure to adequately investigate and verify safety conditions did not have a legally sufficient causal relationship to the consequences of the collision. The plaintiffs' claims were therefore dismissed. The judgment also criticized the school's handling of the aftermath of the accident.

According to a later report by Mainichi Shimbun, contemporary newspaper accounts indicated that the Chinese railway inspector who was killed in the collision received compensation of only ¥2,500 Renminbi (approximately ¥80,000 Japanese yen at the time). (Note: In addition to compensation paid by the Chinese authorities, the total included a ¥15 million death insurance payment from JTB, ¥14 million from the Japan Health and School Welfare Center, approximately ¥7 million raised through public donations, and ¥8 million in condolence payments from the victims' school. When presenting the compensation plan to the victims' families, the school stated that it bore no legal responsibility for the accident and that the ¥8 million payment represented its final contribution. This position subsequently became a source of litigation.)

=== Trial ===
Following the accident, Zhou Xiaoniu and Liu Guolong, the driver and assistant driver of Train 311 respectively, were arrested on 3 April and 22 April 1988. On 22 September 1988, the Shanghai Railway Transport Intermediate Court publicly heard the case concerning the head-on collision of the passenger trains. Zhou was convicted of causing a major traffic accident and sentenced to six years and six months' imprisonment, while Liu received a sentence of three years' imprisonment.

== Reactions ==
=== Interactions with the victims' families and the Japanese government ===
On the afternoon of 25 March, the Foreign Affairs Office of the Shanghai Municipal People's Government briefed Shigenobu Yoshida, the Consul General of Japan in Shanghai, on the train collision and held a press conference for both Chinese and foreign media to provide details of the accident. Two additional press conferences were held over the following two days.

On 26 March, Zhang Shu, the Ambassador of China to Japan, travelled from Tokyo to Kōchi Prefecture to convey the Chinese government's condolences to Governor Tsutomu Nakanouchi and Shōtarō Sano, principal of Kochi Gakugei High School. Prior to this, the Chinese Embassy in Japan had formally expressed its regret over the accident to Japan's Ministry of Foreign Affairs.

On 13 May, a delegation headed by Han Zhubin, director of the Shanghai Railway Administration, visited Japan to meet injured survivors receiving treatment in Tokyo and Osaka. The delegation also visited the families of all victims in Kōchi Prefecture individually and offered formal apologies.

On 24 February 1989, the Shanghai Railway Administration sent facsimiles to the victims' families, inviting them to Shanghai to attend memorial events marking the first anniversary of the disaster. The administration offered to cover all travel and accommodation expenses for a three-day visit.

=== Japanese response ===
Japanese authorities received the first reports of the collision at approximately 7:00 p.m. local time on 24 March 1988.Following the accident, the Japanese Ministry of Foreign Affairs established a task force to coordinate the response, while major newspapers and television networks provided extensive coverage of the disaster. According to Kyodo News, the collision may have resulted from an excessive emphasis on transportation capacity and operational targets at the expense of safety and discipline.

On the evening of 25 March, Parliamentary Vice-Minister for Foreign Affairs Takujiro Hamada arrived in Shanghai on the same flight as the parents of the deceased and injured students.

Following the accident, several Japanese high schools planning educational trips to China, as well as some tourist groups, announced that they would cancel their scheduled visits.

=== Chinese response ===
On 25 March, Acting Premier Li Peng sent a message to Japanese Prime Minister Noboru Takeshita, expressing his condolences to the families of the Japanese students and other victims who were killed or injured in the collision. On the same day, Chinese Foreign Minister Wu Xueqian sent a message to Japanese Foreign Minister Sosuke Uno, conveying his sympathies to the victims and their families and stating that Chinese authorities were making every effort to treat the injured and deal with the aftermath of the disaster.

On the afternoon of 25 March, Han Kehua, director of the China National Tourism Administration, sent a message to Japanese Transport Minister Shintaro Ishihara, expressing his condolences over the deaths of members of the Kochi school excursion group.

On 26 March, Shanghai Vice Mayor Liu Zhenyuan delivered a eulogy during a funeral ceremony for the victims.

== Aftermath ==
In the wake of the collision, the Ministry of Railways of China introduced a series of new railway safety regulations. These included mandatory brake testing within the first section of a journey after departure from the originating station and the requirement that passenger trains include a buffer car in their consist. The ministry also emphasized strict compliance with locomotive operating procedures and communication protocols between train crews and station personnel. The accident further accelerated the development of train monitoring systems and the nationwide implementation of coded signalling on station sidings.

The accident was later commemorated in Japanese popular culture. Takazo Murashita wrote the song Shanghai Kara ("From Shanghai"), included on his album Koibumi, in memory of the students who died in the collision. Meanwhile, Daisaku Ogata's song Wuxi Ryojou, which mentions a train journey from Shanghai via Suzhou to Wuxi, was reportedly subject to voluntary broadcasting restrictions in Japan for several years following the disaster. The accident was also referenced in Keigo Higashino's novel Journey Under the Midnight Sun.

The collision also affected plans for Fuji Television's 30th-anniversary Orient Express '88 project. The original itinerary had called for the train to be shipped from Shanghai to Japan, but the embarkation point was subsequently changed to Hung Hom in Hong Kong.

To provide a place of remembrance for the families and friends of the Japanese victims, a memorial altar was erected near the site of the collision, and two cypress trees were planted nearby.

== See also ==
- List of rail accidents in China
