= Brandsen rail disaster =

1981 train collision in Argentina

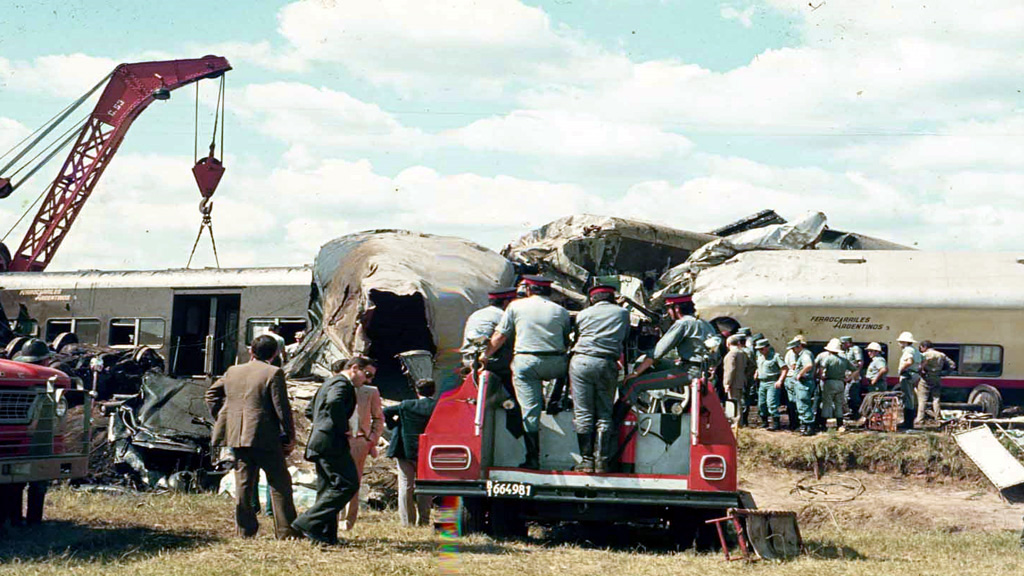

Details
- Date: March 8, 1981; 4:30
- Location: Brandsen
- Country: Argentina
- Line: Constitución–Mar del Plata
- Operator: FC Roca
- Service: Passenger; Freight
- Incident type: Head-on collision
- Cause: Points failure

Statistics
- Trains: 2
- Passengers: 803
- Deaths: 34
- Injured: 74

The Brandsen rail disaster occurred on March 8, 1981, in Brandsen, a town in Buenos Aires Province in Argentina, when a passenger train carrying 803 passengers collided head-on with a freight train, killing 34 and injuring another 74. The train crash was caused by points failure.

It is considered one of the worst tragedies in the history of rail transport in Argentina. The Brandsen disaster was also the second accident involving a Luciérnaga long-distance service in Brandsen Partido after the Altamirano rail disaster occurred in 1964.

== Overview ==
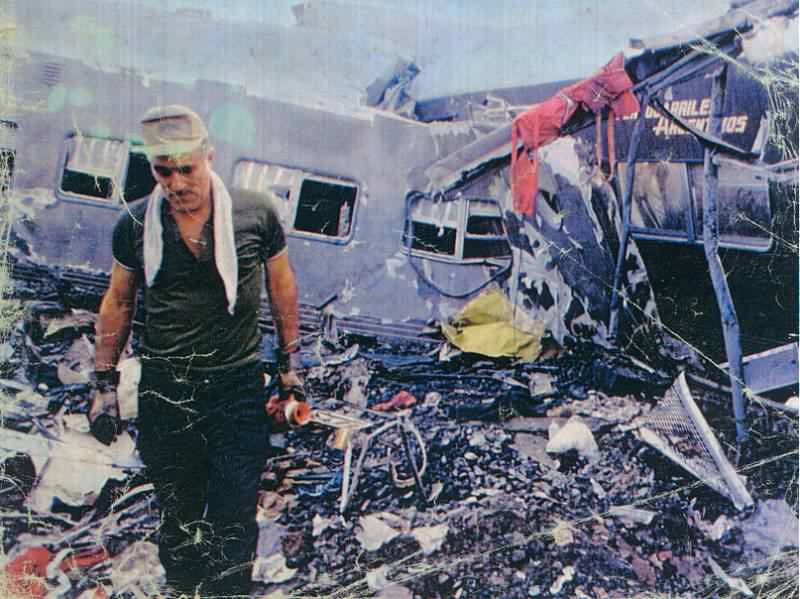
A member of the rescue team. Behind him, a shattered passenger coach

The accident occurred at 4:30 on March 8, 1981, when a passenger train named La Luciérnaga ("the firefly") operated by state-owned Ferrocarriles Argentinos that had departed from Mar del Plata Station on March 7 at 23:55, ran on General Roca Railway tracks to Constitución Station in Buenos Aires with 803 passengers on board. The train ran at a speed of 120 km/h. In the opposite direction, a freight train transporting oil was stopped on km. 69 after derailing on the opposite track. The derailing caused a tank railcar to stop on the track where the Luciérnaga ran.

The Luciérnaga entered to a curve near the bridge over Samborombón River. Due to the high speed, the passenger train could not stop on time, crashing into the tank railcar. Due to the strong impact, the diesel locomotive overturned while the wagons were stacked upon each other. The crash caused the death of 34 people and 74 injured.

Victims were taken to Brandsen, La Plata, Mar del Plata, Chascomús, and Buenos Aires. Several eyewitnesses said that the driver of the freight train ran away when he saw the Luciérnaga coming, after his failed attempts to warn the driver of the passenger train.

When seeing light signals made with a lantern I realised something had happened. After leaving the curve, I saw vehicles on the track so I activated the emergency brake but due to the high speed, the collision was inevitable.

— Domingo Fernández, driver of La Luciérnaga

According to the train driver, it would have needed at least 1,000 meters of distance to stop the train. The line to Mar del Plata was interrupted during several days due to some wagons could not be removed from the place of the accident. It was determined that the derailment was caused by the break of an axle.

A white cross placed alongside PR 29 commemorates the tragedy.
