= Daisaku =

- Gender: Male

Origin
- Origin: Japanese
- Meaning: Different meanings depending on the kanji used

Daisaku (written: 大作) is a masculine Japanese given name. Notable people with the name include:

- Daisaku Hiraki (平木 大作; born 1974), Japanese politician
- Daisaku Ikeda (池田 大作; 1928–2023), Japanese Buddhist philosopher, educator, writer and nuclear disarmament advocate
- Daisaku Kadokawa (門川 大作; born 1950), Japanese politician
- Daisaku Kimura (木村 大作; born 1939), Japanese film director and cinematographer
- Daisaku Shinohara (篠原 大作; 1933–2016), Japanese actor and voice actor
- Daisaku Takeda (武田 大作; born 1973), Japanese rower
