= Stratford Centre =

Shopping mall in Stratford, London

Coordinates: 51.5416°N 0.0000°E

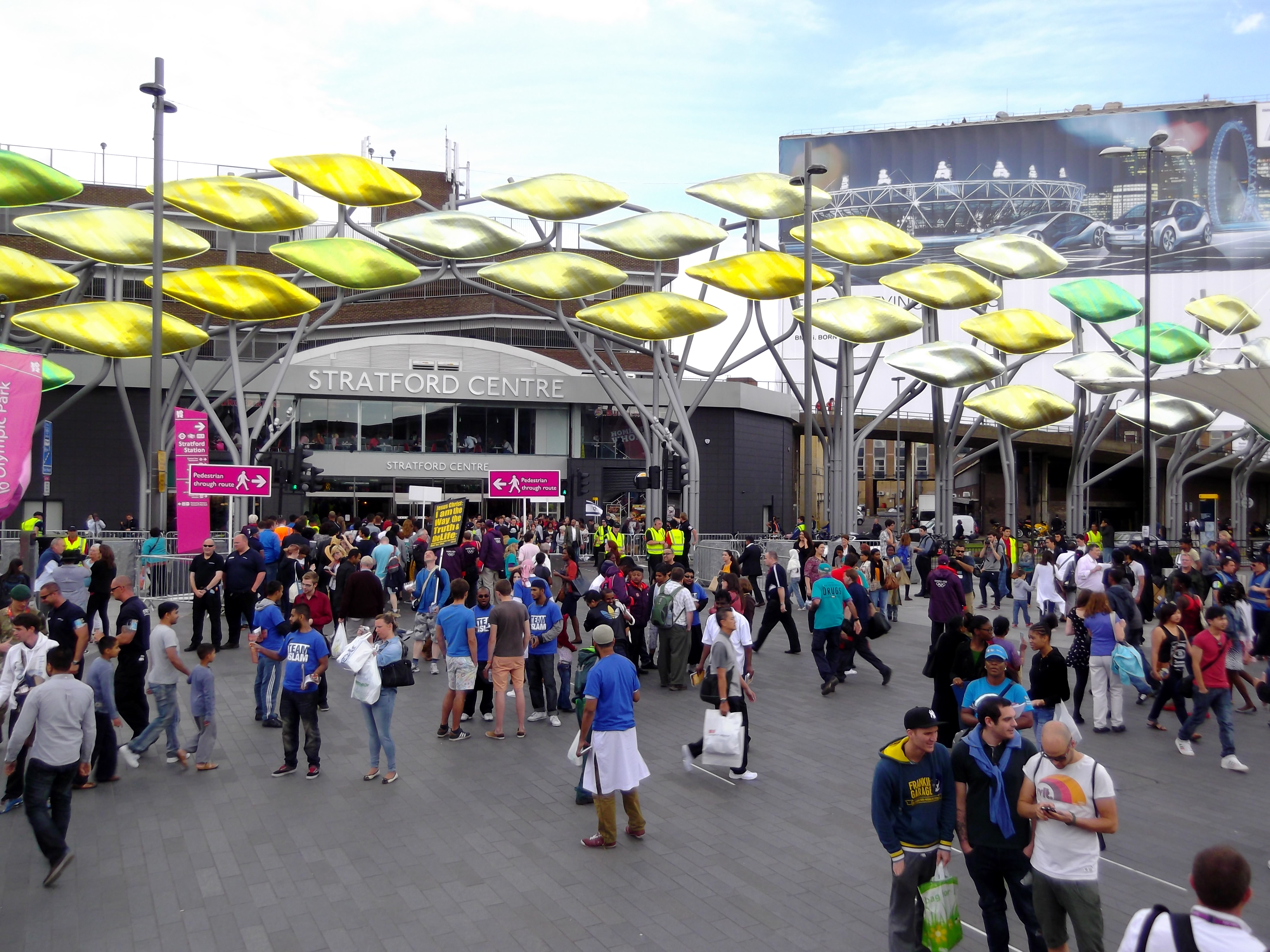
- The Stratford Centre in 2012, with the "Stratford Shoal" sculpture
- Location: Stratford, London
- Address: Stratford Centre, 54a Broadway, Stratford, London E15 1NG
- Opened: 1974; 52 years ago
- Owner: Catalyst European Property Fund LP
- Num. of stores: 62
- Floor area: 330,000 sq. ft.
- Floors: 1
- Parking: Yes
- Public transit: Stratford railway station, Stratford bus station
- Website: stratfordshopping.co.uk

Stratford Centre is a shopping mall and indoor market in Stratford town centre in east London. It is situated east of the busy Stratford station, separated only by the Stratford bus station, collectively contributing to the high footfall through Stratford Centre, which stood at 21 million visitors in a 2010 report, as many people use it as a cut-through between the stations and Stratford Broadway. Stratford Centre is adjacent to the Westfield Stratford City shopping complex and the sports facilities of Queen Elizabeth Olympic Park, further contributing to Stratford town centre being east London's primary retail, cultural and leisure centre.

Stratford Centre has 60 retail units, internally and externally. Off the East Mall is the Market Village, which contains many small independent traders, and in the West Mall is a market that trades Monday to Saturday.

== History ==
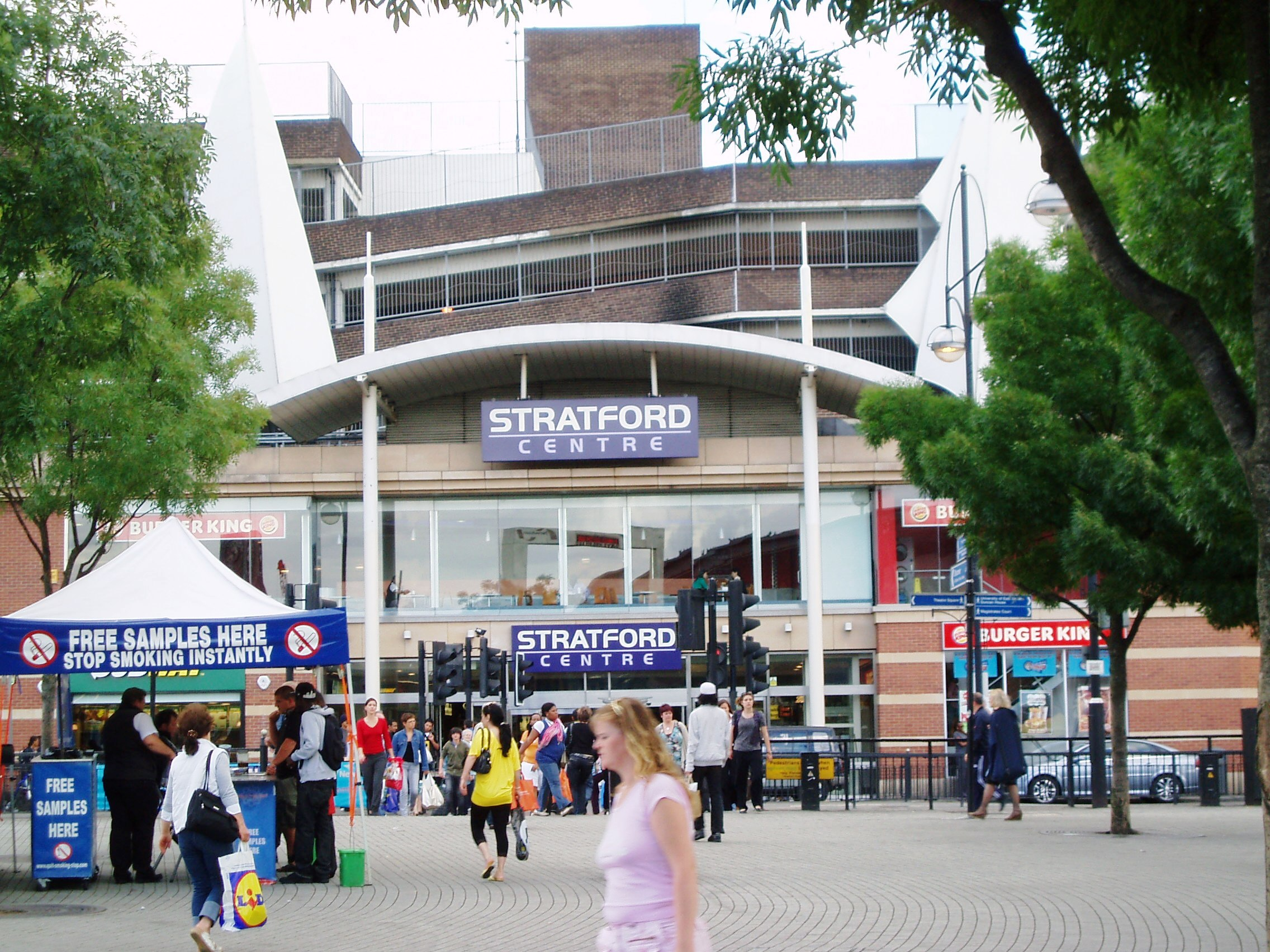
The Stratford Centre in 2008

It was built by Ravenseft Properties, and opened in 1974. Refurbished and partially extended in 1998, it comprises 320,000 sq. ft. on a single level. It was sold by Land Securities to Catalyst Capital's European Property Fund LP in 2010.

In 2013, Catalyst Capital tabled a concept to re-develop the site, including a 26-storey residential building focused on students, as laid out by architectural firm Allford Hall Monaghan Morris, and to include additional parking and shops in the shopping centre. The concept did not move forward.

A section of the Stratford Centre is open 24 hours a day, as a public throughway. This open status has turned the Stratford Centre into a de facto homeless shelter, while also attracting an overnight subculture of skateboarders. This has contributed to incidents of violence and open drug use.

In September 2017, an acid attack involving a noxious substance took place at the centre, injuring six people. In January 2018, another evening attack with a noxious substance took place in the plaza at the entrance of Stratford Centre, during an altercation between youths and homeless people; five victims were treated on site and three others were transported to hospital.

During 2018, the Stratford Centre was closed after 50 shops were flooded by a burst water main on Stratford Broadway, where the flood water was a depth of around eight inches.

== Access ==
To the north of the site lies Stratford station which is served by London Underground's Central and Jubilee lines, Greater Anglia trains, the Elizabeth line, London Overground's Mildmay line the Docklands Light Railway and a number of c2c services.

Stratford Centre's central thoroughfare, the West Mall, is an indoor car-free street market between Stratford Broadway and Great Eastern Street. It is classed as a public highway and by law is kept open 24 hours a day, though most of the shops along the West Mall close at night. There is also a multi-storey car park which is open 24 hours a day and linked via lifts and stairwell in the West Mall.
