= Ravenseft Properties =

Ravenseft Properties Ltd was a subsidiary of Land Securities established in 1949 to invest £60million in 150 UK towns and cities with new retail and town centre developments.

The company pioneered the redevelopment of post-war bomb sites and worked with local authorities to develop new buildings. Its concept was similar to that undertaken by Arndale Property Trust and their Arndale Centres

Following the completion of the post-war sites, the company developed successful town centre developments for a number of New Towns during the 1950s and 1960s such as in Basildon.

== Significant projects ==
- Basildon Town Centre (1958 onwards)
- New Strand Shopping Centre, Bootle (1968)
- Princesshay, Exeter (1950)
- Stratford Centre (1974)
