= Wembley Central rail crash =

1984 railway accident in London, England

Coordinates: 51.54957°N 0.29330°W

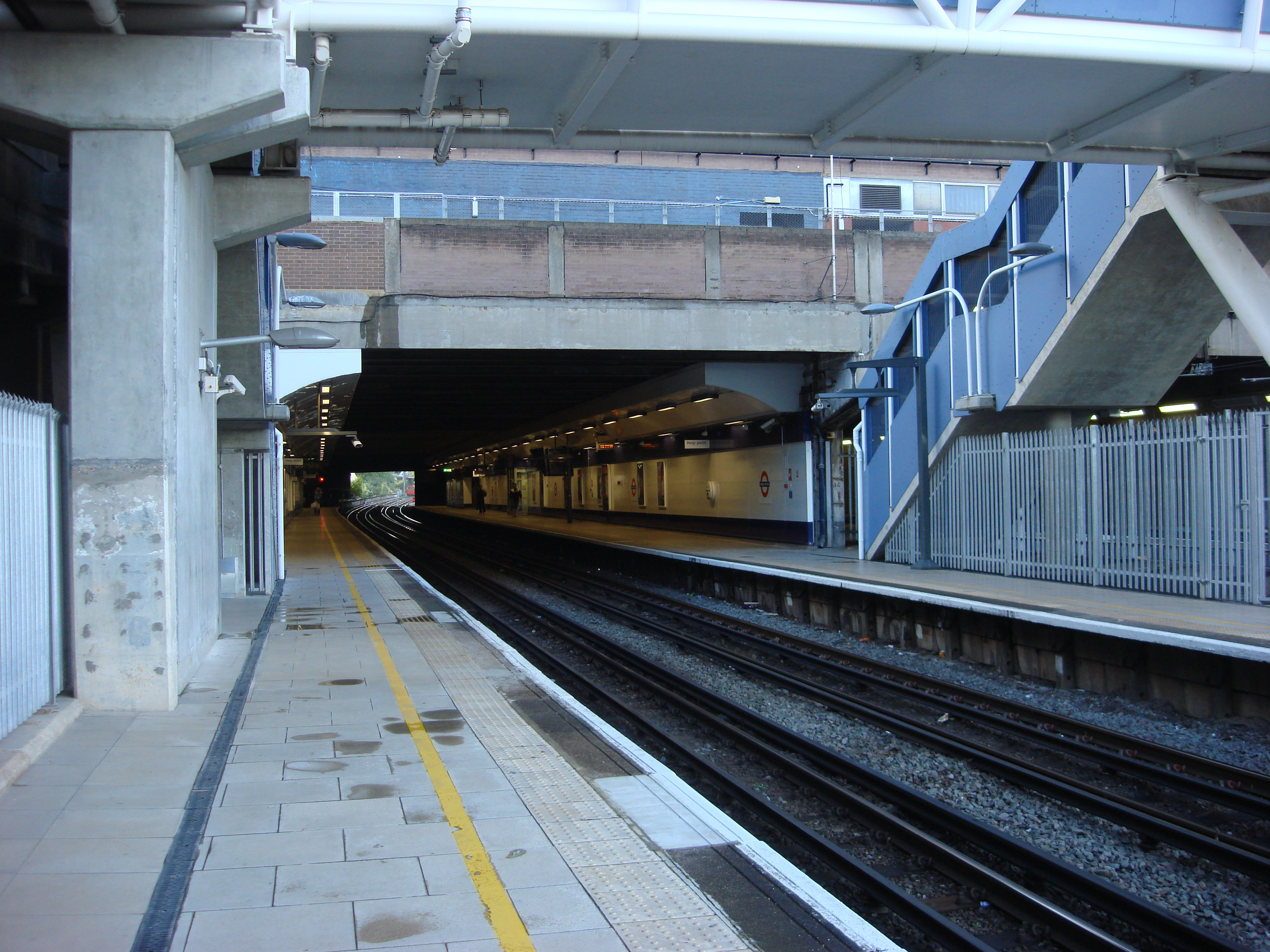

Details
- Date: 11 October 1984; 18:04
- Location: Wembley, Greater London
- Country: England
- Line: West Coast Main Line
- Operator: British Rail
- Owner: British Rail
- Cause: Signal passed at danger

Statistics
- Trains: 2
- Deaths: 3
- Injured: 18

The Wembley Central rail crash was a fatal railway accident that occurred on 11 October 1984 just outside Wembley Central railway station, Greater London.

The 17:54 passenger train from London Euston to Bletchley, formed of two Class 310 electric multiple units, collided with a Freightliner train which was leaving Willesden yard. The first two coaches of the passenger train overturned onto their sides and three passengers were killed; 17 passengers and the driver were injured.

The passenger train had passed a signal at 'danger' after the driver had suffered a transient episode of amnesia, brought about by a rare medical condition. As a result, he had cancelled the AWS warnings at the signals approaching Wembley without realising.

== Incident ==
Shortly after 18:00 a Freightliner train, 4D62, the 16:00 from Willesden to Holyhead consisting of locomotives 86006 and 85035 hauling 20 loaded Freightliner wagons was signalled from a goods line on to the Down Slow line just to the south of Wembley Central station. The train was negotiating the crossovers that led from the goods line to the Down Slow line when its eleventh wagon was struck by an eight-car electric multiple-unit passenger train, 2A85, the 17:54 from London Euston to Bletchley, consisting of two 4-car Class 310 electric multiple-units. The resulting impact led to the deflection of the passenger train to its left towards the adjacent Fast lines with the remaining coaches derailed and overturned onto their sides apart from the rearmost coach.

Emergency services were quickly called to the scene and arrived within twelve minutes. The resulting collision caused damage to track, signalling and overhead line equipment with the debris blocking all main lines into and out of Euston. Three passengers died, with a further seventeen passengers, including the driver of the passenger train, taken to a nearby hospital, with two detained. One detained passenger was released on 15 October and the other on 1 November.

== Aftermath ==
The Down Fast line was restored at 18:22 on 12 October and later closed to traffic on 14 October to enable repairs to be completed. The Up Slow line was restored at 18:54 on 13 October and the Down Slow Line was restored on 06:00 on 15 October.

== Investigation and report ==
A formal inquiry was ordered under the Regulation of Railways Act 1871 and was conducted by the Chief Inspecting Officer of Railways, Major Rose, who opened the inquiry. Evidence was heard in public in London on 9 November and addressed the question of whether the freight train was moving or stationary at the moment of impact.

=== Medical board ===
The investigation turned its attention to the medical board when it was discovered that the driver Ronald Armstrong (born 25 July 1921) had an unusual medical history. Armstrong regularly informed the board about suffering episodes of irregular disturbed vision that occurred three to four times a year without warning. Armstrong said he did not have such an episode when driving a train although he did suffer disturbed vision while driving his car.

Armstrong had also suffered from morning headaches which dated back many years which often occurred when getting up. Although the symptoms were dull, never severe and frontal in situation, he slept well but tended to wake in the early hours. He also suffered from bouts of indigestion, which was treated with bicarbonate of soda. Armstrong also suffered from panic attacks with an episode occurring before the accident. One medical condition he no longer suffered from was breathlessness and he also lost his sense of smell 18 months before the accident occurred.

Another medical condition that featured in the enquiry was short period amnesia, a rare condition that could incapacitate a driver while still allowing him to remain upright and operate his train. This and other conditions were brought to the attention of the investigating officer and a panel of eminent doctors. The possibility of this condition being present was a factor in the decision not to prosecute the driver.

== Recommendations ==
The investigating officer noted the failure of two technical devices to prevent this accident, these being the dead man's handle and the Automatic Warning System (AWS). A driver suffering from short period amnesia would continue to hold the former and cancel the latter while not taking effective action to slow or stop his train. He recommended adoption of a vigilance device to ensure the driver was alert and an improved form of AWS.

== Notes and references ==
=== Sources ===
- Nock, O. S.; Cooper, B. K. (1987). Historic Railway Disasters (4th ed.). London: Ian Allan. ISBN 0-7110-1752-2.
- Rose, C. F. (1986). Railway Accident: Report on the Collision that Occurred on 11th October 1984 near Wembley Central Station in the London Midland Region of British Railways (PDF) (Report). London: HMSO. OCLC 59085711.
