= Train protection system =

Railway fail-safe against human error

A train protection system is a railway technical installation to ensure safe operation in the event of human error.

== Development ==
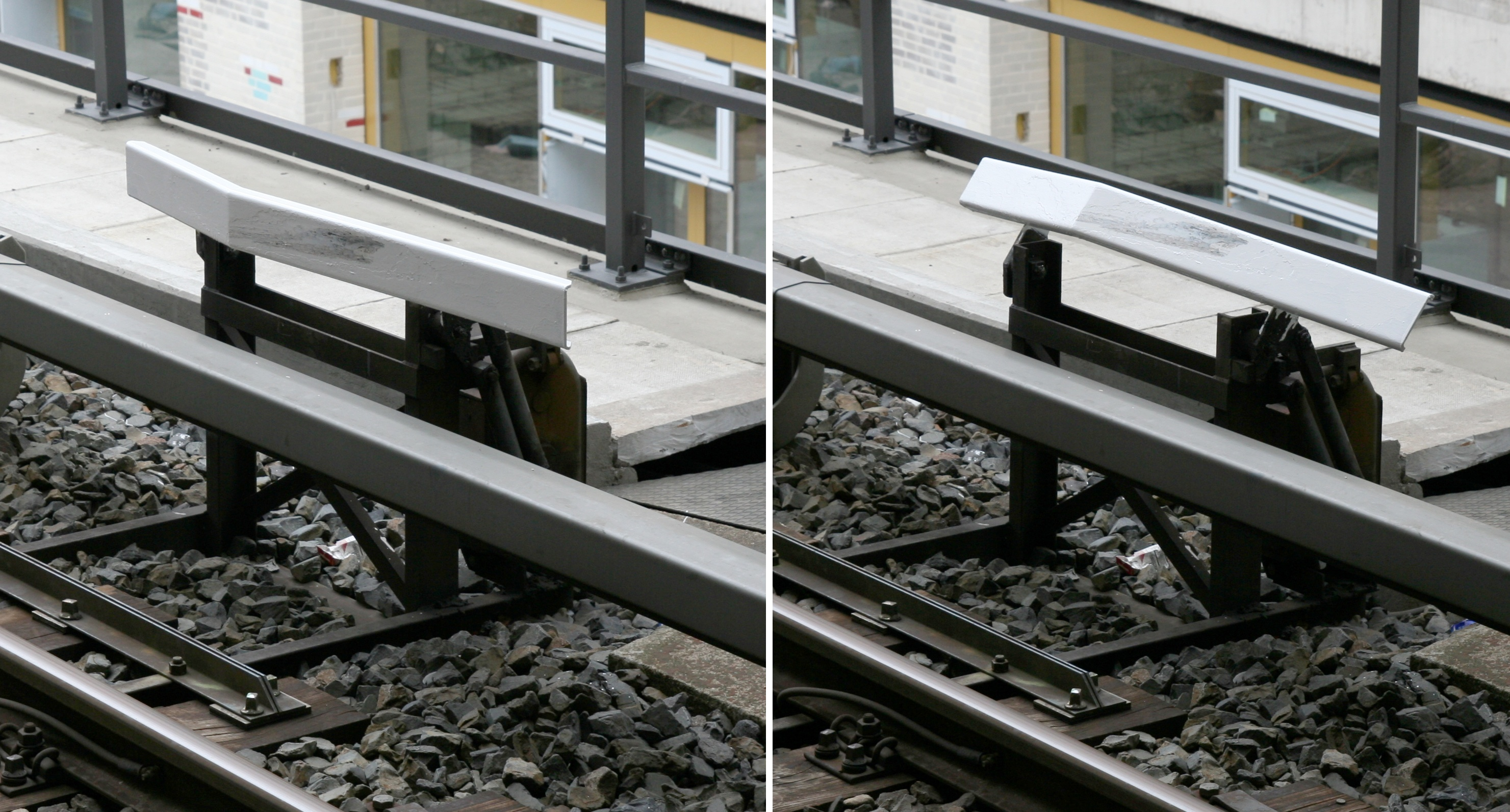
Berlin S-Bahn train stop in its engaged (left) and disengaged (right) position

=== Train stops ===
The earliest systems were train stops, as still used by the New York City Subway, the Toronto subway, the London Underground, the Moscow Subway (only on the older lines) and the Berlin S-Bahn. Beside every signal is a moveable arm. If the signal is red, levers connected to valves on any passing train hit the arm, opening the brake line, applying the emergency brake, If the signal shows green, the arm is turned away from the levers and there is no contact.

The Great Western Railway in the UK introduced its 'automatic train control' system in the early years of the 20th century. Each distant signal had before it a ramp between the running rails. If the signal showed green, the ramp was energised with a low voltage current which was passed to the locomotive when a shoe came into contact with the ramp. A bell rang in the locomotive's cab to confirm the clear aspect, and the electric current kept the brakes from being applied. If the signal showed yellow (meaning the next signal would show red) the ramp was dead and a siren sounded in the cab. If the siren was not cancelled, the brakes would automatically be applied. After the nationalisation of the railways in the UK in 1948, this system was later replaced by the magnetic induction "automatic warning system".

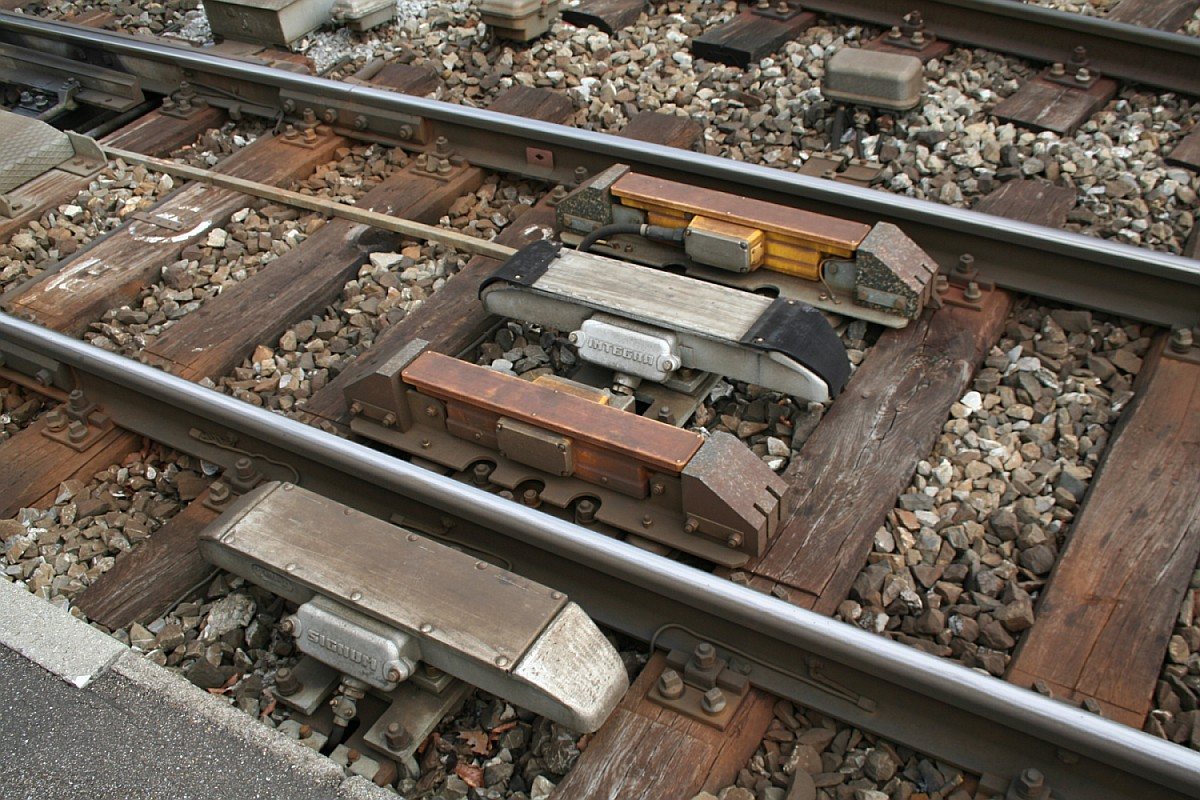
Trackside magnets for very simple data communication. Outside and middle of track: Integra-Signum, other two (yellow) magnets: ZUB

=== Inductive systems ===
In inductive system, data is transmitted magnetically between the track and locomotive by magnets mounted beside the rails and on the locomotive.

In the Integra-Signum system the trains are influenced only at given locations, for instance whenever a train ignores a red signal, the emergency brakes are applied and the locomotive's motors are shut down. Additionally, they often require the driver to confirm distant signals (e.g. CAWS) that show stop or caution – failure to do so results in the train stopping.

More advanced systems (e.g., PZB, and ZUB) calculate a braking curve that determines if the train can stop before the next red signal, and if not they brake the train. They require that the train driver enter the weight and the type of brakes into the onboard computer. One disadvantage of this kind of system is that the train cannot speed up before the signal if it has switched to green because the onboard computer's information can only be updated at the next magnet. To overcome that problem, some systems allow additional magnets to be placed between distant and home signals or data transfer from the signalling system to the onboard computer is continuous (e.g., LZB).

=== Radio-based ===
Prior to the development of a standard train protection system in Europe, there were several incompatible systems in use. Locomotives that crossed national borders had to be equipped with multiple systems. In cases where this was impossible or impractical, the locomotives themselves had to be changed. To overcome these problems, the European Train Control System standard was developed. It offers different levels of functionality, ranging from simple to complex. This model allows adopters to meet the cost and performance requirements of disparate solutions, from the smallest to the largest. The European system has been in operation since 2002 and uses GSM digital radio with continuous connectivity.

=== Cab signaling ===
The newer systems use cab signalling, where the trains constantly receive information regarding their relative positions to other trains. The computer shows the driver how fast they may drive, instead of them relying on exterior signals. Systems of this kind are in common use in France, Germany and Japan, where the high speeds of the trains made it impossible for the train driver to read exterior signals, and distances between distant and home signals are too short for the train to brake.

These systems are usually far more complex than automatic train protection systems; not only do they prevent accidents, they also actively support the train driver and detect blind spots around trains. Some systems are able to drive the train nearly automatically.

== Variants ==
=== International standards ===
- European Train Control System (Heavy rail)
- Communications-based train control (Rapid Transit)

=== Country-specific systems ===
System	Country
ACSES	United States of America
ALSN	Russian Federation, Belarus, Estonia, Latvia, Lithuania, Ukraine
ASFA	Spain
ATB	Netherlands
ATC	Sweden, Denmark, Norway, Brazil, South Korea, Japan, Australia (Queensland), United Kingdom
ATCS	United States of America
ATACS	Japan
ATP	United Kingdom, United States of America, Brazil, Australia (Queensland), Hong Kong, Indonesia, Ireland, Dominican Republic, Denmark
AWS	United Kingdom, Australia (Queensland & South Australia)
BACC-RS4 Codici /-SCMT	Italy
CAWS	Ireland
CBTC	Brazil, United States of America, Canada, Singapore, Spain, Gabon, Hong Kong, Indonesia, Denmark, United Kingdom, Australia (partially in Melbourne)
CONVEL	Portugal
Crocodile/Memor	Belgium, France
CTC	United States, New Zealand
CTCS	China
EBICAB	Bulgaria, Finland, Norway, Portugal, Spain, Sweden
EVM 120	Hungary
HKT	Denmark
I-ETMS	United States of America
Integra-Signum	Switzerland
ITARUS-ATC	Russian Federation
ITCS	United States of America
TCAS (KAVACH)	India
KLUB	Russian Federation
KTCS	South Korea
KVB	France
LKJ 2000	China, Ethiopia
LS	Czech republic, Slovakia
LZB	Germany, Austria, Spain
PTC	United States of America
PZB Indusi	Germany, Indonesia, Austria, Romania, Slovenia, Croatia, Bosnia-Herzegovina, Serbia, Montenegro, Macedonia, Israel, United Kingdom
SACEM	France, Hong Kong
SHP	Poland
TASC	Japan
TBL	Belgium, Hong Kong (formerly)
TPWS	United Kingdom, Australia (Victoria)
TVM	High speed lines in: France, Belgium, United Kingdom, Channel Tunnel, South Korea
TWC	United States, New Zealand
VEPS	Estonia
ZUB 123	Denmark
ZUB 262	Switzerland

- By country/region
  - Australia - Queensland (AWS and EBICAB)
  - Australia - South Australia (AWS)
  - Australia - Western Australia (EBICAB)
  - Austria (Indusi / PZB, ZUB 262, LZB)
  - Belarus (ALSN)
  - Belgium (MEMOR, TBL, TVM)
  - Brazil (ATP, ATC)
  - Bulgaria (EBICAB 700)
  - Croatia (Indusi)
  - Czech Republic (LS)
  - China (LKJ 2000, CTCS)
  - Denmark (ATC, ATC-t, ATP, HKT, ZUB 123)
  - Dominican Republic (ATP)
  - Estonia (ALSN)
  - Ethiopia (LKJ 2000)
  - Finland (EBICAB 900)
  - France (Le Crocodile, KVB, SACEM, TVM)
  - Germany (Indusi / PZB, ZUB 262, LZB)
  - Hong Kong (ATP, SACEM, CBTC)
  - Hungary (EVM)
  - India (Kavach, AWS)
  - Indonesia (ATP, PZB)
  - Ireland (CAWS and ATP)
  - Israel (PZB)
  - Italy (SCMT, Blocco Automatico a Correnti Codificate)
  - Japan (ATACS, TASC, ATC, ATS)
  - Latvia (ALSN)
  - Lithuania (ALSN)
  - Luxembourg (ETCS)
  - Netherlands (ATB)
  - Norway (EBICAB 700)
  - Poland (Radio-Stop, SHP, CA)
  - Portugal (EBICAB 700, named on the Portuguese Railways as CONVEL)
  - Romania (Indusi / PZB)
  - Russian Federation (ALSN)
  - Slovak Republic (LS)
  - South Korea (ATC, ATS, KTCS, TVM)
  - Spain (ASFA, LZB, EBICAB 900)
  - Sweden (EBICAB 700, Ansaldo L10000)
  - Switzerland (ZUB 121, ZUB 262, Integra-Signum)
  - Turkey (Tren Denetim Sistemi (TDS))
  - Ukraine (ALSN)
  - United Kingdom (ATP, TPWS, AWS), High Speed 1 (TVM, KVB)
  - United States of America (ACSES, ATCS, I-ETMS, ITCS)

== See also ==
- Anti Collision Device
- Cab signalling
- Dead man's switch
- Linienzugbeeinflussung
- Platform screen doors
- Positive Train Control
- Train speed optimization
- Trap point
- Vehicle blind spot

== Bibliography ==
- Glover, John (1996). London's Underground. Ian Allan. ISBN 0-7110-2416-2.
