= Balise =

Beacon or transponder used on railways

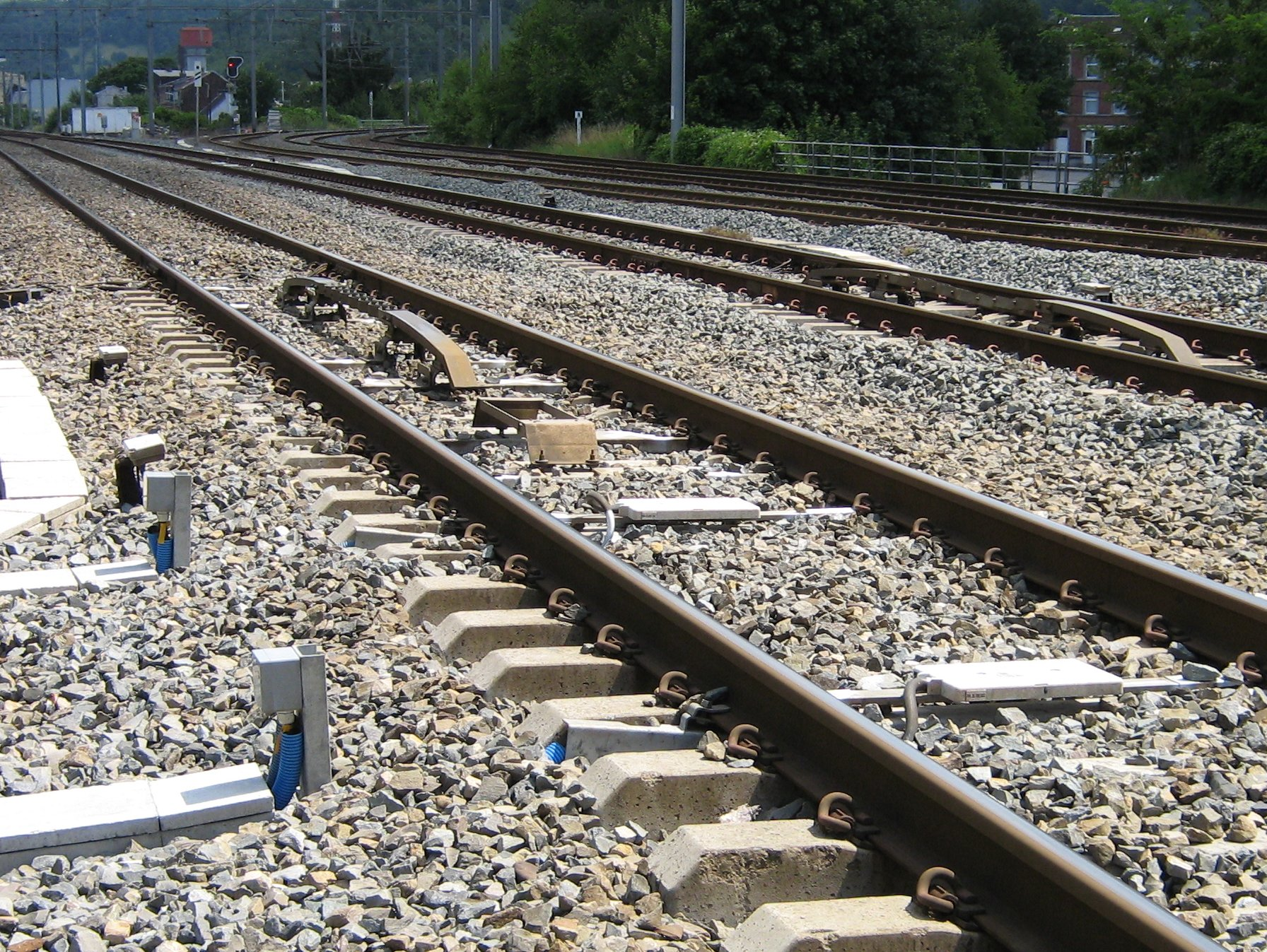
A Eurobalise pair for ETCS/TBL+ along with a conventional TBL balise and the original Croco train stop at a signal in Belgium

A balise (/bəˈliːz/ bə-LEEZ) is an electronic beacon or transponder placed between the rails of a railway as part of an automatic train protection (ATP) system. The French word balise is used to distinguish these beacons from other kinds of beacons.

Balises are used in the KVB signalling system installed on main lines of the French railway network, other than the high-speed Lignes à Grande Vitesse.

Balises constitute an integral part of the European Train Control System, where they serve as "beacons" giving the exact location of a train. The ETCS signalling system is gradually being introduced on railways throughout the European Union.

Balises are also used in the Chinese Train Control System versions CTCS-2 and CTCS-3 installed on high-speed rail lines in China, which is based on the European Train Control System.

A balise which complies with the European Train Control System specification is called a Eurobalise.

== Overview ==
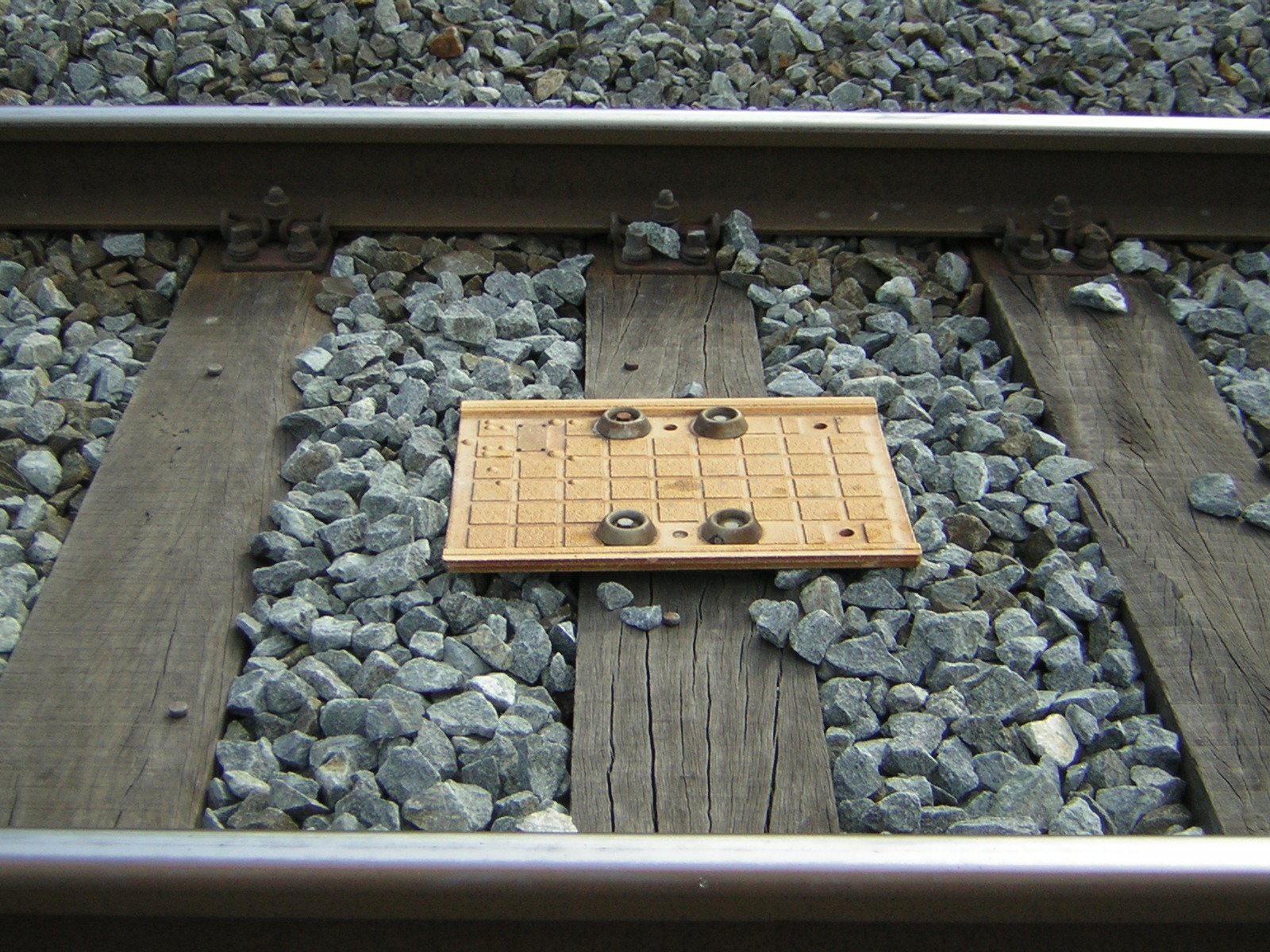
Balise EBICAB in the Mediterranean Corridor

A balise typically needs no power source. In response to radio frequency energy broadcast by a Balise Transmission Module mounted under a passing train, the balise either transmits information to the train (uplink) or receives information from the train (downlink, although this function is rarely used). The transmission rate of Eurobalises is sufficient for a complete 'telegram' to be received by a train passing at any speed up to 500 km/h.

A balise may be either a 'Fixed Data Balise', or 'Fixed Balise' for short, transmitting the same data to every train, or a 'Transparent Data Balise' which transmits variable data, also called a 'Switchable' or 'Controllable Balise'. (Note that the word 'fixed' refers to the information transmitted by the balise, not to its physical location. All balises are immobile.)

A fixed balise is programmed to transmit the same data to every train. Information transmitted by a fixed balise typically includes: the location of the balise; the geometry of the line, such as curves and gradients; and any speed restrictions. The programming is performed using a wireless programming device. Thus a fixed balise can notify a train of its exact location, and the distance to the next signal, and can warn of any speed restrictions.

A controllable balise is connected to a Lineside Electronics Unit (LEU), which transmits dynamic data to the train, such as signal indications. Balises forming part of an ETCS Level 1 signalling system employ this capability. The LEU integrates with the conventional (national) signal system either by connecting to the lineside railway signal or to the signalling control tower.

Balises must be deployed in pairs so that the train can distinguish the direction of travel 1→2 from direction 2→1, unless they are linked to a previous balise group in which case they can contain only one balise. Extra balises can be installed if the volume of data is too great.

Balises operate with equipment on the train to provide a system that enhances the safety of train operation: at the approaches to stations with multiple platforms fixed balises may be deployed, as a more accurate supplement to GPS, to enable safe operation of automatic selective door opening.

== Installation ==
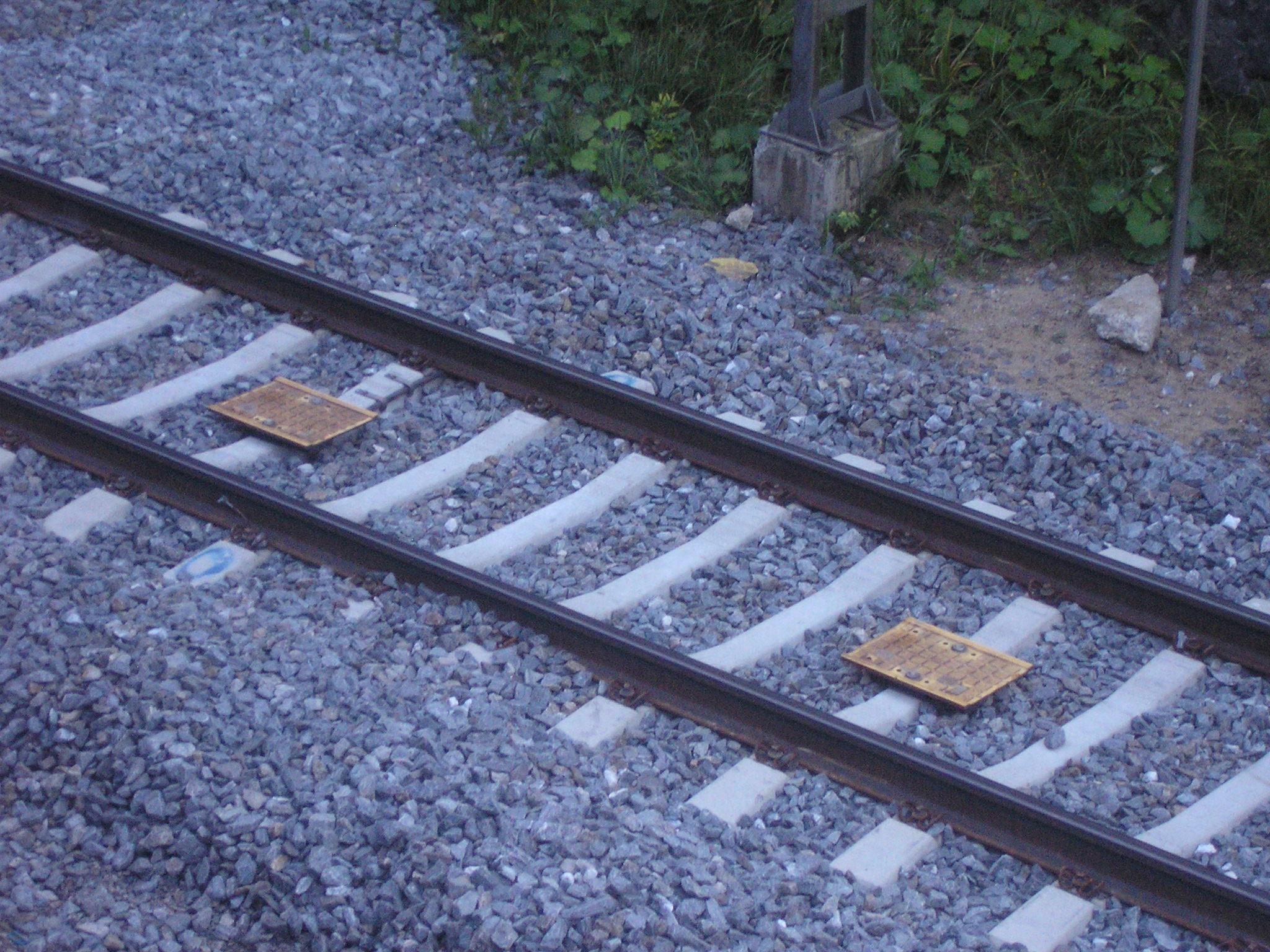
Eurobalises on Orivesi-Jyväskylä railway in Muurame, Finland

The balise is typically mounted on or between sleepers or ties in the centre line of the track. A train travelling at maximum speed of 500 km/h (310 mph) will transmit and receive a minimum of three copies of the telegram while passing over each Eurobalise. The earlier KER balises (KVB, EBICAB, RSDD) were specified to work up to 350 km/h (220 mph).

The train's on-board computer uses the data from the balises to determine the safe speed profile for the line ahead. Enough information is needed to allow the train to come to a safe standstill if required.

The data in the balise can include the distance to the next balise. This is used to check for missing balises which could otherwise lead to a potential wrong-side failure.

At the start and end of ATP-equipped territory, a pair of fixed balises are often used to inform the onboard ATP equipment to start or stop supervision of the train movements.

== Usage ==
Eurobalises are used in:

- ETCS – the European-wide train protection system
- Chinese Train Control System versions CTCS-2 and CTCS-3, used on high speed rail lines in China
- EuroSignum – a variant of the earlier Swiss Integra-Signum train protection system
- EuroZub – a variant of the earlier Swiss ZUB 121 train protection system
- SCMT – an Italian train protection system
- TBL1+ – a train protection system used in Belgium
- GNT – the system to control tilting trains in Germany
- ZBS – a new rapid transit control system for the S-Bahn Berlin
- TASS – a system to control the tilting of trains on the West Coast Main Line

Balises other than Eurobalises are used in:

- KVB – a train protection system used in France
- ASFA – a train protection system used in Spain
- ACSES – a train protection system used by Amtrak on the Northeast Corridor in the USA
- ATACS – a moving block train protection system used in some parts of Japan
- Automatic train control (ATC), Automatic train protection (ATP), Automatic train stop (ATS) and Communications-based train control (CBTC) in many parts of the world
- EBICAB – a train protection system used in Norway, Sweden, Finland and some other countries, including parts of Spain
- TASC – an automatic train braking and protection system used on some Japanese railway lines
- C-APT – (historical) a system once developed for the APT to transmit permissible speed and airtightness information

== History ==
The earliest automatic train protection system were purely mechanical with a tripcock which could be connected directly to the braking system by releasing the opening a switch in the hydraulic system. There were multiple incidents where trains had overrun a stop signal but due to excessive speed still crashed despite the automatic stop. Multiple systems were invented to show the speed in the driver's cab and to provide an electronic system on the train that would prevent speeding. With the advent of high-speed trains it was generally expected that a speed indicator on line-side signals is not sufficient beyond 160 km/h (99 mph) so that all these trains need cab signalling.

A combined solution to the requirements was the German LZB system that was presented in 1965. The original installations were all hard-wired logic. The first real cab electronics was presented in 1972 (named LZB L72) and a cab computer was introduced by 1980 (LZB 80). The LZB system uses a wire in the middle of the tracks that had loops at a distance of 100 m (330 ft) so that the position of a train was known more precisely than in any earlier system. As a result, the LZB system was not only used on high-speed tracks but also in commuter rail to increase throughput. Due to the deployment costs of the system however it was restricted to these application areas.

During the 1970s, British Rail developed C-APT, the system utilising passive transponders (balises) placed at no more than 1km track intervals, that would transmit the track speed (in an 80-bit packet) to a passing train, for in-cab display. If the train's control system failed to receive an update within 1km of the last signal, the displayed speed limit would be blanked and an audio tone generated that the driver had to respond to, otherwise the train's brakes would be automatically applied. The system was put into revenue service starting December 1981, with the introduction of the British Rail Class 370.

The development of a system using the principle of passive balises with fixed or controlled information started in 1975 by LMEricson and SRT, following an incident in Norway in 1975 (Tretten). The LME/SRT system became the Ebicab system. The Ebicab system established the principles of using magnetic coupling, 27 MHz downlink from the antenna on the locomotive to energize the balises, and an uplink using 4,5 MHz to transmit information telegrams from the balises. The controlled information in the balises is encoded from statuses in the signalling system. The telegrams contains information about permitted speeds, and distances. The information is used in the on-board computer to calculate brake curves, monitor speed and eventually apply brakes. In Norway, the first line equipped with Ebicab as ATP was operational in 1983. The Ebicab principles are subsequently used in KVB and RSDD systems and also for the ERTMS ETCS balises. During the 1980s, other cab computers were introduced to read the older signalling and to overlay it with better control. The German PZ80 was able to check the speed in steps of 10 km/h (6.2 mph). The French KVB replaced the external system with balises in the early 1990s to transmit a combined information for oncoming signal aspects and the allowed train speed. Siemens did also invent a successor to the PZB signalling that was deployed as ZUB 121 in Switzerland since 1992 and ZUB 123 in Denmark since 1992. ABB improved the external balises in the EBICAB 900 system which as then adopted in Spain and Italy.

Siemens had presented a study on balise systems in 1992 which influenced the choice of using a technology based on KVB and GSM instead of LZB when the European Rail Traffic Management System was researching a possible train signalling for Europe. The first Eurobalises were tested in 1996 and later train protection systems used them as a basis for their signalling needs.

== See also ==
- Automatic Warning System
- Cab signalling
- EBICAB
- Linienzugbeeinflussung
- Positive Train Control
- Train Protection & Warning System
