= Train speed optimization =

A system that reduces the need for trains to brake and accelerate

Train speed optimization, also known as Zuglaufoptimierung, is a system that reduces the need for trains to brake and accelerate, resulting in smoother and more efficient operation.

While train speed optimization needs some technical infrastructure, it is more of an operational concept than a technical installation. One can relatively easily implement train speed optimization using for instance cab signalling (e.g. using ETCS), but the presence of a cab signalling system does not necessarily mean that it uses train speed optimization. Train speed optimization may also be implemented using conventional signalling.

== Conventional signal operation ==
Usually, trains are allowed to run at the maximum speed the track allows until the distant signal of next occupied block. This is inefficient in many cases, because this way the train comes to a halt in front of the red signal and has to accelerate again from zero.

== Advantages using train speed optimization ==
If the train slows down much earlier, given the right timing, it reaches the distant signal just when the home signal switches to green, and so does not need to stop. Thus, wear on the brakes is reduced and the train uses less energy. But the main reason, especially for trains that accelerate slowly, is that the train passes the home signal at high speed, compared to the conventional case where the train often has to accelerate from standstill. This effectively increases track capacity, because the time it takes for the train to run from the distant signal (that has just turned green) to the home signal is often much less than the time it takes for a train to accelerate from the home signal.

== Equipment ==
For a train speed optimization system to work, it is necessary to have a signalling system which is capable of displaying several different speeds, for instance 40, 60, 90 km/h and the full line speed, which also requires a train protection system that is able to handle these cases (cab signalling may replace these installations). Further, the track must be equipped with inductive loops that detect the presence of trains with sufficient precision (or other means of detecting the positions of the trains). Finally a computer system is needed that is able to reasonably predict the movements of the trains for the next few minutes.

== Train speed optimization in practice ==
The expensive and complicated installations usually only make sense for heavily used routes.

Swiss Federal Railways:

- Lenzburg-Killwangen (since 2000)
- Zurich-Altstetten
- Around Olten (installed 2004, current status unknown)
- Probably other places (Zürich S-Bahn?)
