= Train control =

Train control may refer to:

- In a push–pull train, control of the locomotive from either an on-board cab or a control car
- Signalling control directs the overall traffic of trains to allocate space and prevent collisions
- Train protection system controls trains to stop them in the event of human failure
