= ATCS =

ATCS may refer to:

- Academy for Technology and Computer Science, part of high school Bergen County Academies in New Jersey, United States
- Advanced Train Control System, a railroad safety and monitoring system
- Areal Traffic Control System
- Asian Touring Car Series, a touring car racing series in southeast Asia
