= KLUB (train control system) =

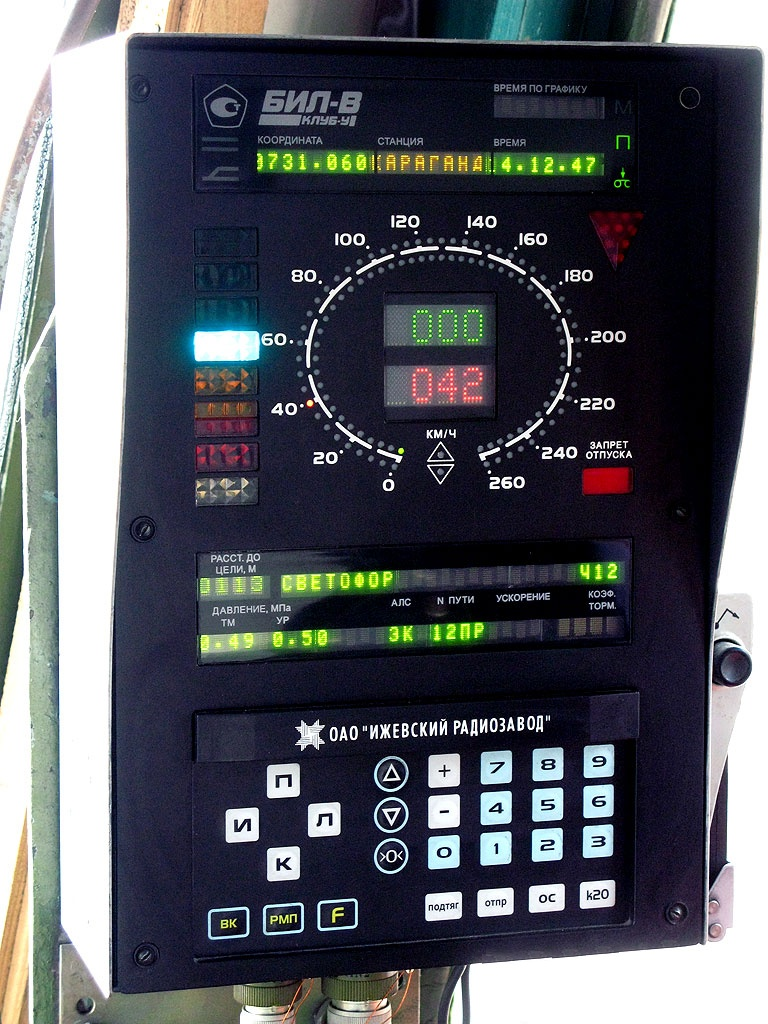
KLUB-U cab signaling

KLUB is the name of the modern Russian train control systems. The abbreviation "КЛУБ" stands for "Комплексное локомотивное устройство безопасности", Integrated Train Protection System.

== Variants ==
The most common variant is KLUB-U where the U stands for unified (унифицированный).

KLUB-U in-cab signalling systems are able to decode the track-side ALSN codes (Continuous Automatic Train Signallisation) which is similar to RS4 Codici (comparable to Pulse Code Cab Signaling in the US). In the newer ABTC-M block control the KLUB-U systems decode signals by TETRA digital radio including a remote initiation of a train stop. In those areas the train position is derived from a satellite navigation system (GPS or GLONASS). The ITARUS-ATC connects the KLUB-U in-cab system via GSM-R digital radio with the ERMTS Level 2 RBC block control.

The KLUB-U systems are capable for high-speed tracks like that of the Velaro RUS (Sapsan).

The variant KLUB-P (КЛУБ-П) is restricted to cab signaling without track safety equipment. It is only used in category-II trains (including special cars and shunting movements). The variant KLUB-UP (КЛУБ-УП) is allowed for category-I trains (including passenger transport) where it replaces the cab signaling of ALSN.

== Development ==
The history of KLUB devices goes back to the year 1988 when it was considered to create a new microprocessor-controlled cab signaling that would allow advanced features. In the early 1990s a number of proposals were tested until in October 1994 the first KLUB device was certified for operation - in the following years there were 1214 locomotives being equipped with this version. This first KLUB version can be easily identified by its LED display (later KLUB devices use LCD displays).

In 1997 the manufacturer VNIIAS proposed a concept on the development of a new trail control system which the ministry approved. The concept KURS-B (КУРС-Б - Система комплексная унифицированная для регулирования и обеспечения безопасности движения поездов - integrated system for train control and train safety) would consist of three main parts: the KLUB-U cab signaling, the SAUT brake control (САУТ - система автоматического управления торможением) and the TS-KBM vigilance control (ТС КБМ - телемеханическая система контроля бодрствования машиниста).

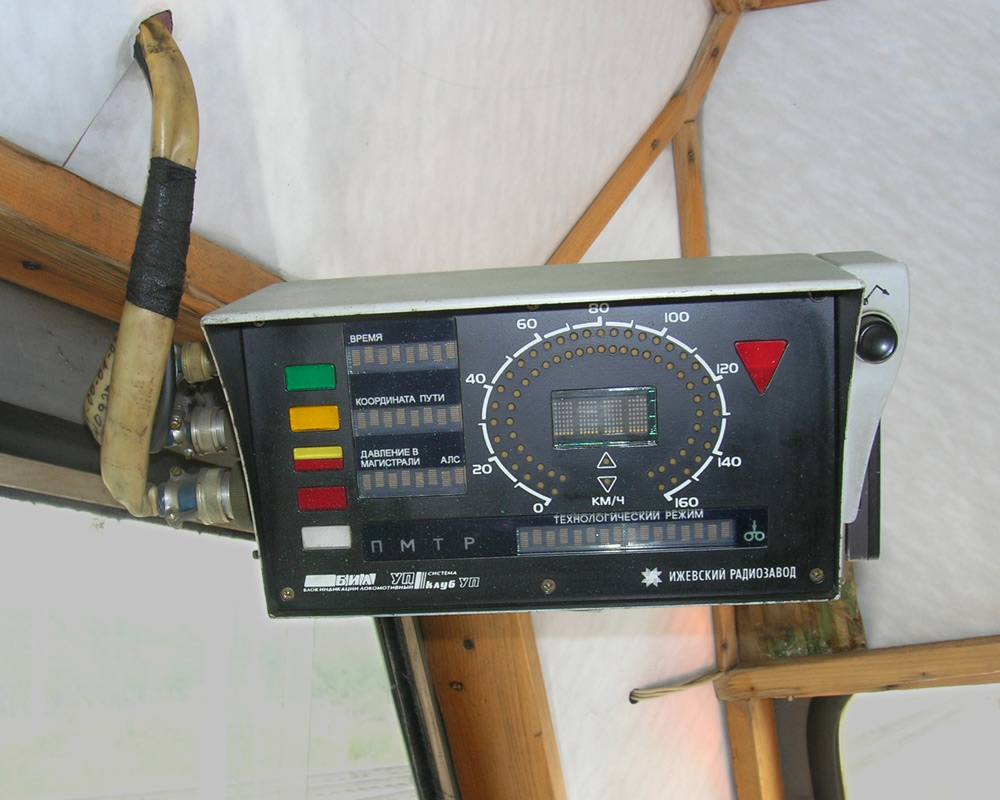
KLUB-UP variant in an AS1A locomotive

The development of KURS-B began in 1998. To increase the safety, all modules function separately. The system was designed to be open so that more modules can be integrated later - all modules communicate via CAN bus. All sub-modules are in duplicate in the system. In 1999 the KLUB-U was certified and went into production; the variants KLUB-UP and KLUB-P were derived since 1999 and they are in production since 2000.

The computerized KLUB-U cab signaling contains allows the integration of an electronic map and the usage of GLONASS (rarely GPS) satellite-based location. In 2007, 12% of all KLUB-U control units were equipped with a GIS option while 100% of the KLUB-UP control units were delivered with satellite navigation. A PC interface allows to download recorded process data to support maintenance and to upload updated electronic route maps. The tapped data is aggregated in a service center - the service center also publishes the updates of the track maps.

An important extension is the integration of digital radio in the KLUB-U system. The reason is that the ALSN signals could not be detected safely at high speeds. A "MOST" bridge interface (Мост - Bridge) will feed the signals in the simplest case by decoding a radio repeater transmitting at 160 MHz or 460 MHz. It is also possible to integrate the signaling of GSM-R or TETRA radio. In the first phase that is mainly used in the station area where the dispatcher can issue both track-releases (as in the case of a failure of stationary signals) but he can also remotely trigger an emergency stop - this feature was introduced in 2004 at the request of the ministry.

The growing number of safety modules did increase the number of warning signals as well as the number of automatic brake incidents. A subsequent analysis lead to a refined specification which was pushed to the cab computers with an update in late 2006. The number of failures dropped from 164 in 2006 to 80 in 2007. In 2004 another development started as well targeting a new electronic interlocking device communicating via digital radio with the train sets. This ABTC-M block control system (АБТЦ-М - система автоблокировки с централизованным размещением аппаратуры - Autoblock System with Central Control) was introduced in 2006.

In 2010 the Russian Railways had equipped almost 12,000 vehicles with satellite navigation being about 36 percent of the rolling stock that runs with KLUB-U or KLUB-UP. Estimates for the time frame up to 2015 indicate a requirement of satellite-navigation train equipment to be installed in the range of 28,000 to 30,000 devices - additionally there will be a requirement of 50,000 hand-held devices for location and communication of railway workers. The devices to connect control center, railway workers and train staff are using the TETRA mobile communication standard.

=== ITARUS-ATC ===
KLUB-U is at the center of an expanded concept EKS (ЕКС - единая комплексная система управления тяговым подвижным составом - Single Unified Train Control System). This will be able to decode signals from Eurobalises and display the information in an extended version that allows representation of signals according to European railway standards. For cross-border transport to Finland a cooperation with Ansaldo STS was created in 2007 which developed the Italian-Russian train control system ITARUS-ATC ((ITAlian-RUSsian - Automatic Train Control) being compatible with ETCS. It is similar to ERTMS Level-2 (being able to use GSM-R to communicate with its Radio Block Center) but adds satellite navigation to the system. The system combines inertial navigation and wheel sensors to measure distance and turns to enhance safety for passenger service in the Russian Federation.

Ansaldo was contracted in January 2010 to deploy the ITARUS-ATC on the test track for a later rail connection to Sochi up to the 2014 winter games. Belarus wants to license the system to use this ETCS- and KLUB-compatible train control system on the Pan-European transport corridors 2 and 9. At the end of November 2010 Finmeccanica (parent company of Ansaldo) and Russian Railways (mother company of VNIIAS) have signed a Memorandum of Understanding to found a joint venture to develop the ITARUS-ATC system. The deal includes a project to use the train control system to equip 100 stations, 100 trains and 50 lines until 2020 - estimations find the deal to be worth about 2 billion Euro.

== See also ==
- Positive Train Control - effort in the United States to create Differential-GPS based train control system.
