= Blocco automatico a correnti codificate =

Italian railway signalling block system

Blocco automatico a correnti codificate (BACC or BAcc, automatic block with codified currents) is a signalling block system used in Italy on railway lines using 3 kV DC electrification.

The track circuits used to detect the presence of a train also transmit coded signals to the trains which are used for train protection and cab signaling. Train protection systems that use BAcc are RS4 Codici, RS9 Codici and SCMT.

== Codes ==
The information is conveyed by superposition of two amplitude-modulated alternating currents in the rails (with a carrier frequency of 50 Hz and 178 Hz, respectively). Receiver coils in front of the first axle of a locomotive or control car are used to detect the signal.

The frequency of the modulating signal encodes the signal aspect:

modulation frequency of 50 or 83.3 Hz carrier	modulation frequency of 178 Hz carrier	code	meaning
(none)	(none)	AC (Assenza di Codice)	transmission failure, e.g. on a siding not equipped with the required track circuitry
75 / min	(none)	75	the next signal is at "stop" or the train is about to enter a dead-end track, a partially occupied track or a track with particular short braking distance
120 / min	(none)	120	the next signal displays a speed restriction (to 30 km/h, 60 km/h or 100 km/h)
120 / min	75 / min	120*	the next signal displays a speed restriction to 100 km/h
120 / min	120 / min	120**	the next signal displays a speed restriction to 130 km/h (this code is currently not being used)
180 / min	(none)	180	the next signal is at "proceed", but the signal after that is at "stop" or displays a speed restriction (this code is also being used to announce the end of the BACC-equipped line)
180 / min	75 / min	180*	the next signal is at "proceed", but the signal after that displays a speed restriction (to 100 km/h or 130 km/h), or the train is approaching a slow zone with a speed limit of 150 km/h or less
270 / min	(none)	270	proceed with a maximum speed of 180 km/h
270 / min	75 / min	270*	proceed with a maximum speed of 220 km/h
270 / min	120 / min	270**	proceed with a maximum speed of 250 km/h

While RS4 Codici is a simple cab signalling system that only requires the driver to acknowledge any change in the aspect of the next signal, SSB (On board sub system) RS9 equipment also continuously monitors the train speed and computes braking curves according to the train's length, mass, and braking ability.

RS4 Codici uses a single 50 Hz alternating current. All codes that do not use the 178 Hz carrier are used identically for both RS4 and RS9 Codici. Thus, RS9 is backward-compatible to RS4 Codici.

An alarm is sounded in the cab if the train exceeds the speed setpoint by more than 3 km/h. If the train exceeds the speed setpoint by more than 5 km/h or misses the designated stopping place, the system applies emergency brakes.
