= Transmission voie-machine =

Railway cab signaling technology used on high-speed rail

TVM Block Marker. This sign marks the end of each block section on high-speed lines signalled with TVM cab signalling.

Transmission voie-machine (French: [tʁɑ̃smisjɔ̃ vwamaʃin]; TVM; 'Track-to-train transmission') is a form of in-cab signalling originally deployed in France and is mainly used on high-speed railway lines. TVM-300 was the first version, followed by TVM-430.

TVM-300 was developed in the 1970s as part of the TGV project. At speeds faster than 220 kilometres per hour, TGV trains only run along dedicated tracks designated as lignes à grande vitesse (LGV). When travelling at high speed, it is not possible for the driver to accurately see colour-light railway signals at the side of the track. Signalling information is instead transmitted to the train and displayed on the train driver's dashboard. The driver is shown the safe operating speed, measured in kilometres per hour.

The 1980s-developed TVM-430 system provides more information than traditional signalling systems would allow, including track gradient profiles and information about the state of signalling blocks further ahead. This high degree of automation does not remove the train from driver control, although there are special safety mechanisms that can safely bring the train to a stop in the event of driver error.

== Background ==
=== History ===
The TVM system was developed by the French group Compagnie de Signaux et d'Entreprises Electriques (CSEE), now part of Hitachi Rail STS.

Two versions of TVM signalling, TVM-430 and TVM-300, are in use on the LGV. TVM-430, a newer system, was first installed on the LGV Nord to the Channel Tunnel and Belgium, and supplies trains with more information than TVM-300. Amongst other benefits, TVM-430 allows a train's onboard computer system to generate a continuous speed control curve in the event of an emergency brake activation, effectively forcing the driver to reduce speed safely without releasing the brake. TVM-430 is also utilized on the KTX network in South Korea, further enhancing high-speed rail operations in the region.

TVM-430 was presented from an intended "modular and flexible" range of signalling system levels from TVM-400 up to TVM-440 (optional automatic train control) and TVM-450 (full driverless control).

=== Implementation ===
The line is divided into signal block sections of about 1,500 metres (~1 mi), the boundaries of which are indicated by blue square signs printed with a yellow-on-white triangle. A digital display on the train driver's dashboard shows the maximum permitted speed for a train's current block, as well as a target speed based on the status of the line ahead. The maximum permitted speed is based on factors such as the proximity of trains ahead (with steadily decreasing maximum permitted speeds in blocks closer to the rear of the next train), junction placement, speed restrictions, the top speed of the train and distance from the end of LGV route. Trains at high-speed take several kilometres to stop. Since trains will require more than one signal block to slow down, drivers are alerted to reduce speed gradually, several blocks before any required stop.

The signalling system is permissive; the driver of a train is permitted to proceed into an occupied block section without first obtaining authorisation. Speed in this situation is limited to 30 kilometres per hour (19 mph) and if speed exceeds 35 km/h (22 mph), the emergency brake is applied and the train stops. If the board marking the entrance to the block section is accompanied by a sign marked Nf, the block section is not permissive, and the driver must obtain authorisation from the Signalling and Control Centre (Poste d'Aiguillage et de Régulation) before entering the block. Once a route is set, or the signalling centre has provided authorisation, a white lamp below the marker board is lit to inform the driver. The driver then acknowledges the authorization using a button on the train's control panel. This temporarily overrides the emergency braking system, which would otherwise stop the train when proceeding past the non-permissive marker's ground loop.

When trains enter or leave the LGV from lignes classiques, they pass over a ground loop which automatically switches the driver's dashboard indicators to the appropriate signalling system. For example, a train leaving the LGV onto a French ligne classique would have its TVM signalling system deactivated and its traditional KVB (Contrôle Vitesse par Balise, English: beacon speed control) system enabled.

==== Electronics ====
It is one of the more advanced railway signalling systems in the world, although the implementation itself is still based on relays rather than solid state electronics.

There are two components to the TVM-430 system: one ground-based, the other on board the train. Both run using Motorola 68020 class processors, and are programmed in Ada, a computer language often used in safety critical systems. The system makes extensive use of redundancy.

The ground-based segment of TVM-430 resides in trackside boxes, which control stretches of track about 15 km (9.3 mi) long. Each one is linked to the line's centralized traffic control centre, and directly controls about ten blocks of track, each with its own track circuit. Signaling information is encoded in AC signals which are fed into the rails of each block. There are four different carrier frequencies available in TVM-430 and they are used alternately in pairs on both tracks of the TGV line. On one track, blocks use alternately 1,700 Hz and 2,300 Hz, while on the other track blocks use alternately 2,000 Hz and 2,600 Hz. Upon these carrier frequencies can be modulated 27 separate audio frequencies, any combination of which can be present at one time; the earlier TVM-300 used eighteen separate frequencies, only one of which could be present at any time. Each block has a receiver at the opposite end to the transmitter, and the loss of the track circuit signal (owing to shorting by train wheels or due to a failure) is interpreted as an indication that the block is occupied. Signalling block boundaries are equipped with electrical separation joints that prevent adjacent blocks from interfering with each other, whilst still letting the traction return current (at 50 Hz) pass through. These tracks circuits are referred as a UM71 C track circuit.

The signals which are present in the rail are detected by antennas mounted underneath the front airdam of TGV trains, approximately 1 metre (3 ft) forward of the front axle. These antennas work by inductively coupling to the AC signal shunted between the rails by the first axle. There are four redundant antennas per train, two at each end. Only the two at the "front" of the train (in the direction of travel) are used. The signal from the track circuit is filtered, conditioned, and decoded on board the train by two redundant digital signal processors.

===== Radio interface =====
Continuous signal

For the continuous signal an analogue bandpass filter is applied to isolate the range of TVM frequencies between 1,600–2,640 Hz. Within this, each of the four 1,700/2,000/2,300/2,600 Hz carrier-frequencies are tested for the presence of a frequency-modulated 25.68 Hz signal. The 25.68 Hz signal is necessary for the track-circuit function and for the activation of relays within the train TVM430 equipment. The data bits themselves are frequency modulated at 0.64 Hz intervals between 0.88 Hz and 17.52 Hz.

Intermittent signal

At fixed locations cable loops are used between the tracks. A reference signal of 62.5 kHz is transmitted, along with two 125 kHz carrier frequencies, out-of-phase with each other. A 4,800-baud message is transmitted using phase jumps.

===== Network code =====
The network code is stored in bits 25–27 giving a value between 1–7.

Code	Railway Line
0	
1	Eurotunnel
2	CTRL1 (UK)
3	CTRL2 (UK)
4	unknown, probably reserved
5	unknown, probably reserved
6	LN5
7	LN3 – LN4

===== LGV Nord =====
Nine-bits contain the network identification code and checksum. The exactly meaning of the remaining 18-bits depends on the particular network code and is known as the "parametrisation". For the first deployment on the LGV Nord, 8-bits are assigned for the speed information, 6-bits for the current block length and 4-bits for the gradient of the current block:

	TVM 430	LGV Nord usage			TVM 430
Bits used	3	8	6	4	6
Purpose	network code	speed	distance	gradient	checksum

==== Encoding ====
The decoded signal takes the form of a 27-bit digital word, with each bit corresponding to one of the 27 frequencies modulated onto the carrier frequency in the track circuits. The presence of a particular frequency indicates a "1" bit and lack of corresponds to a "0". The resulting word contains several fields, in the following order:

- Speed Codes containing three pieces of information: the current maximum safe speed in the block, the target speed at the end of the block, and the target speed at the end of the next block. Each of these can take on six different values; in the case of a high speed line these are (in km/h) 320, 300, 270, 230, 170, 80 and 0, roughly corresponding to a typical braking and deceleration profile.
- Gradient information, averaged over the length of the block. This allows the train's signalling computers to account for this in speed calculations.
- Block Length, which can vary quite a bit, and is also important in speed calculations. For example, on a flat stretch of high speed track, a block can be a full 1500 metres long, while in the terminal areas of the Channel Tunnel, blocks are one-tenth as long.
- Network Code, a number which determines the interpretation of the speed codes which should be taken by the train's computer. For example, on high speed lines where the maximum allowable speed is 300 km/h (186 mph), a different network code is used from that in the Channel Tunnel, where the speed limit is 160 km/h (100 mph). Eurostar trains need this information since they operate both on high speed tracks and in the tunnel.
- Error-Checking code, allowing the integrity of the entire 27-bit word to be checked if the information has been misread. This allows error correcting as well as error detection in most cases. The code takes the form of a 6-bit cyclic redundancy check (CRC).

These 27 bits of information are used as an input to the train's signalling computer, the onboard part of the TVM-430 system. In older versions of TVM, the target speed was updated only at every block boundary, resulting in a "staircase" style speed profile which is not representative of the continuous speed changes effected by the driver. However, with the additional information of block length and profile, TVM-430 is able to generate a continuously varying target speed through calculations performed in the onboard signalling computer, thus giving a much more realistic speed profile of continuous acceleration or deceleration for the driver to follow.

In addition to the continuous speed control afforded by TVM-430, single instructions can be passed to the train by inductive loops located between the rails, which couple to a corresponding sensor under the train. Using the same frequency encoding principle, 28 bits of information can be recovered from a beacon, at speeds up to 400 kilometres per hour (250 mph). They come in two lengths depending on the line speed, 7 metres and 4.5 metres. These are called BSP (boucle à saut de phase) Intermittent Transmission Loops (ITL). They consist of two half loops, which together transmit the message via a 125 kHz frequency, phase shifted with a 62.5 kHz carrier frequency. The information passed along concerns a variety of events or actions required:

- Entry or exit from a high-speed line
- Arming or disarming the TVM-430 system
- Closing air conditioning vents before entering a tunnel
- Raising or lowering the pantographs
- Switching to a different electrical supply voltage

=== Oversight ===
A "black box" similar to an aircraft flight data recorder, passively watches over the entire process, monitoring a variety of parameters and recording the events. In TVM-430-equipped trainsets, older paper-strip recording equipment has been replaced by the ATESS digital recording system. Every action taken by the driver (throttle, brakes, pantographs) as well as signalling aspects (for TVM-430, KVB, and conventional signals) are recorded on magnetic tape for later analysis using a desktop computer.

Another system, known as VACMA, oversees the driver's alertness. It consists of a foot pedal control that the driver needs to hold down for the TGV to move. This pedal must be released then re-pressed once every 60 seconds if no other activity takes place. There is one period of time before a buzzer sounds, and another period of time before the automatic emergency brakes come on. The control can be released for a very short period of time before a buzzer sounds, and another very short period of time before the automatic emergency brakes come on.

==== Overspeed ====
A small amount of over-speed allowance is made before the train's emergency brakes are applied. At speeds below 80 km/h, the allowance is five kilometres per hour. At nominal speeds of 80–160 km/h, the tolerance is ten kilometres per hour and at speeds in excess of 160 km/h, it is fifteen kilometres per hour.

=== Cab display ===
In the centre of the driver's desk in a TGV cab, just below the windscreen, there is a double or triple row of square indicators. This is where target speeds for the current and subsequent blocks are displayed to the driver, in the form of numbers (in kilometres per hour) on a colour-coded background. Full line speed is indicated in black numerals on a green background, while slower aspects are indicated in white numerals on a black background and a full stop is indicated as "000" on a red background. Below this display is the speedometer, where the continuously varying target speed is indicated as well as the current speed. Speed is measured by the train's redundant tachometers to a precision of ±2%. The allowable variation between target speed and actual speed is dependent on speed.

All the in-cab signalling displays must be very reliable, since they are critical to safety. They have relay-based position sensors which feed back to the signalling computer the current aspect being displayed to the driver. If there is a failure in the display unit, appropriate action is taken to stop the train.

In order to reduce stress on the driver, speeds are displayed over several blocks ahead of the train. When a block is followed by a more restrictive (slower) block, the display for that block flashes so the driver can better anticipate the speed change without releasing the brake. Restrictive indications can only be updated at block boundaries, except in emergencies. They are accompanied by an audible in-cab horn signal. Restrictions can however be lifted at any time within a block.

TVM-430 has extensive redundancy built into it, and one might wonder why it is not used to control the train directly. However, in view of the lack of adaptability of the system to unexpected situations, it is considered desirable to retain a human in the loop. Driving a TGV is therefore done entirely manually, but the signalling system keeps a very close watch to ensure maximum safety.

Cab signals
Name	Signal	Speed limitation		
Name	Signal	Current	Penalty brake from	Expect
Rouge (Stop, track section is occupied or end of line)		Nf marker: 0 km/h		0 km/h or 30 km/h (Nf or F marker)
Rouge (Stop, track section is occupied or end of line)		F marker: 30 km/h	35 km/h	0 km/h or 30 km/h (Nf or F marker)
Zéro (Avertissement 0; stop at next signal)		Previous signal = 160A: 160 km/h	170 km/h	0 km/h or 30 km/h (Nf or F marker)
Zéro (Avertissement 0; stop at next signal)		Previous signal = 80A: 80 km/h	90 km/h	0 km/h or 30 km/h (Nf or F marker)
080E (Exécution 80; do not exceed 80 km/h)		80 km/h	90 km/h	80 km/h
080A (Avertissement 80, speed change to 80 km/h ahead)		160 km/h	170 km/h	80 km/h
160E (Exécution 160, do not exceed 160 km/h)		160 km/h	170 km/h	160 km/h
160A (Avertissement 160; speed change to 160 km/h ahead)		220 km/h	235 km/h	160 km/h
220E (Exécution 220; do not exceed 220 km/h)		220 km/h	235 km/h	220 km/h
220A (Avertissement 220; speed change to 220 km/h ahead)		270 km/h	285 km/h	220 km/h
270V		270 km/h	285 km/h	270 km/h
270VL (Voie Libre 270 km/h; proceed at 270 km/h)		270 km/h	285 km/h	270 km/h
270A (Avertissement 270; speed change to 270 km/h ahead)		300 km/h	315 km/h	270 km/h
300V		300 km/h	315 km/h	300 km/h
300VL (Voie Libre 300 km/h; proceed at 300 km/h)		300 km/h	315 km/h	300 km/h

== Other signalling systems ==
The TVM system is used only on high-speed lines and in the Channel Tunnel. Outside of the high-speed lines, other signalling systems are used. Every TGV train is equipped with the KVB (Contrôle Vitesse par Balise, "Beacon Speed Control") which is used throughout the French ligne classique network. In addition to TVM, the following systems are used in various combinations:

- KVB, the French signalling system (electro-mechanical with radio beacons)
- ATB, the Dutch signalling system (induction based)
- ATB-NG a newer version of ATB (beacon based)
- ATC the Japanese signalling system (induction based)
- Blocco Automatico a Correnti Codificate, the Italian induction-based protection system used on some lines with speed limits above 200 km/h
- MEMOR, the Belgian signalling system (electro-mechanical)
- TBL, a newer version of MEMOR (electro-mechanical with radio beacons)
- InduSi/PZB the German signalling system (induction based)
- LZB, the German system for high-speed lines (also induction based)
- AWS, the British signalling system (induction based)
- TPWS, the warning system which supplements AWS
- ETCS, the European Train Control System is a signalling and control system designed to replace the 14 incompatible safety systems currently used by European railways, especially on high-speed lines.
- Integra-Signum the Swiss induction based signalling system.
- CAWS, a similar form of in-cab signalling system used in Ireland.

== See also ==
- Automatic train protection

== Notes and references ==
This article was originally based on material from TGVweb, which is licensed under the GFDL.

- Kichenside, G.; Williams, A. (1998). Two Centuries of Railway Signalling. Oxford Publishing Co. pp. 215–220. ISBN 0-86093-541-8.
- Safety & Standards Directorate (1996). Appendix C: Illustration of application to Eurotunnel Cab Signalling (PDF). GK/RT0036:Transition Between Lineside Signalling Systems and Other Systems of Train Control (Report). Railway Group Standard. London: Railtrack PLC. pp. 10–12. Archived from the original (PDF) on 17 July 2011.
