= Sistema Controllo Marcia Treno =

Italian train protection system

Sistema di Controllo della Marcia del Treno (SCMT) is a discontinuous train cab signalling system used in Italy. It shares many features with the Ripetizione Segnali (RS) system, the two systems co-existing and working together. The main purpose of SCMT is to control the respect of the speed limit imposed by the signal aspect and the line condition.

SCMT is divided in two parts:

- SSB: Sottosistema di bordo ("Onboard Subsystem")
- SST: Sottosistema di terra ("Ground Subsystem")

== Working principles ==
SCMT is based upon an array of transponders called "Punto informativo" (PI) placed on the tracks near signals, reduced speed zones, and other important points along the line. The PIs form the SST. When a train passes over a PI, a set of "antennas" mounted in front of the first bogie energize it through induction. The PI then passes information about the aspect of the next signal through the antennas to the SSB.

If the system is supported by RS, and if the signal shows a restrictive aspect (anything different from Green) it has to be acknowledged by the train driver by pressing a button, else the system just gives indication of the signal on its display.

The system then elaborates a "braking curve" (curva di frenatura), that indicates the speed the train has to respect during the approach to the signal, until the "target speed" is reached. Failure of either acknowledging signal aspect or keeping the speed under the imposed braking curve/target speed causes the SSB to command emergency braking, which lasts until the speed gets below the limit.

The SSB takes several variables into account, especially when computing the braking curve, such as: percentage of brake weight (Massa frenata, it measures the overall brake efficiency), maximum speed limit allowed by rolling stock, train length, steep gradient, and signal aspect.

As said before, SCMT is a discontinuous system; this means that it is not aware of next signals' aspect changes unless it passes upon the relative PIs. E.g.: if the SSB gets informed by a PI that the approaching signal is "Yellow", it then automatically assumes that the next signal is going to be "Red" and elaborates a braking curve accordingly. But if meanwhile the signal becomes "Green", the SSB does not get aware of it, and it assumes that it is red until the train passes the next PI. This does not apply if the Ripetizione Segnali (RS) is available (only when the train is running on a BAcc block type line). In this case the two system work together, and since RS is a continuous system, the SSB is aware of aspect changes, while still appropriately elaborating the maximum speed the train can run.

SCMT has some benefits, in respect of the RS alone:

- is usable on any block type (Italy has different types of block systems in use, and RS is only usable on Automatic Block);
- constantly checks the maximum allowed speed (RS only on the 9 codes version);

However, it has some disadvantages:

- Frequent delays due to the increased rate of emergency brakes intervention, and for the speed limits imposed which stay even if the signals' aspect changes, as said above (especially in case of signal at danger which becomes green);
- Increased stress for the wheels and braking system because of more frequent emergency braking.
- When received on a buffer stop track, in the last 200 m the SSB imposes a speed of 5 km/h; other than the delay this may cause, on certain types of coaches below this speed doors can be opened, thus introducing safety issues.

To partially solve the first two points, the "V-V-V" (stands for Verde-Verde-Verde) has been introduced. In practice, the distant, protection and departure signals of a station may be encountered by trains showing a green aspect (if some conditions are met), even if the train is scheduled to stop there, and thus is not subjected to speed restrictions imposed by the system.

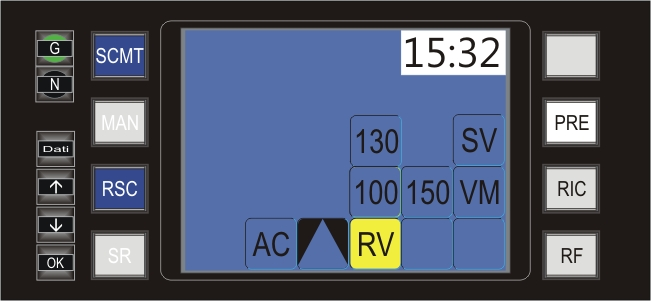
Representation of the SSB

== Description of the SSB ==
Buttons:

- SCMT: manually activates or deactivates the SCMT function (usually it activates itself automatically as soon as any PI is passed).
- MAN (manovra): sets the SSB on shunting mode.
- RSC (ripetizione segnali continua): activates the RS (ripetizione segnali) system.
- SR (supero rosso): sets the SSB on "Train Trip" mode, used to pass Red signals when needed.
- PRE (prericonoscimento): lights when the train is approaching a "Proceed Slow" signal, if the driver does not press it 12 seconds before receiving an "AC" code (which is received after passing the signal) emergency brakes are applied.
- RIC (riconoscimento): lights when the train is approaching a restrictive aspect signal, if not pressed in 3 seconds, emergency brakes are applied.
- RF (riarmo freno): used to release brakes when the SSB commands emergency brakes.

RIC and PRE keys are used only when RS is also active.

The following table shows the meaning of the signal codes icons used on the display and the target speed the train has to reach according to the braking curve/signal aspect-code.

Code/representation on the display	Meaning	Target speed	Notes
No code ("AC" on white background)	No code. It is also used after any signal indicating a speed reduction when the RSC function is present.	30 km/h after "trip mode", or the speed given by the preceding signal after "PRE".	
75 (flashing yellow triangle)	The next signal shows a stop aspect. It is also used before signals showing the red over double yellow aspect.	50 km/h, then 30 km/h 200 meters in rear of the signal. If the SSB commands emergency braking, brake releasing is possible only after the train comes to a full stop.	40 km/h when goods-type braking is active.
120 ("RV" on yellow background)	The next signal shows a 30, 60, or 100 km/h speed reduction, depending on the aspect of the previous signal.	65 km/h after a signal indicating a warning of 30 or 60 km/h speed reduction, 105 km/h after a signal indicating a warning of 100 km/h speed reduction.	40 or 60 km/h when goods-type braking is active.
120* ("100" on yellow background)	The next signal shows a 100 km/h speed reduction.	75–100 km/h	
120** ("130" on yellow background)	The next signal shows a 100 km/h speed reduction. (Not used)	(Not used. Theoretically, up to 130 km/h.)	
180 (white background)	Caution. The next signal shows a cautionary aspect, or there's a slow order in place.	75–115 km/h, depending on brake efficiency or the maximum allowed speed (by infrastructure or rolling stock).	40 or 65 km/h when goods-type braking is active.
180* ("150" on white background)	The next signal shows a warning of a 100 km/h speed restriction. It is also used to limit the speed of trains in case of maintenance works on the line.	90–150 km/h, depending on brake efficiency or the maximum allowed speed (by infrastructure or rolling stock).	
270 (green background)	The next signal shows a clear aspect.	160–180 km/h, depending on brake efficiency or the maximum allowed speed (by infrastructure or rolling stock).	120 km/h when goods-type braking is active.
270* ("VM" on green background)	The next signal shows a clear aspect.	200–230 km/h, depending on brake efficiency or the maximum allowed speed (by infrastructure or rolling stock).	120 km/h when goods-type braking is active.
270** ("SV" on green background)	The next signal shows a clear aspect.	230–250 km/h, depending on brake efficiency or the maximum allowed speed (by infrastructure or rolling stock).	120 km/h when goods-type braking is active.

These speed/signal code values are the same used on Ripetizione segnali.

== See also ==
- Train protection systems
- Cab signalling systems
- Ripetizione Segnali
