= EBICAB =

Automatic train control systems

EBICab is a trademark registered by Alstom (formerly Bombardier) for the equipment on board a train used as a part of an Automatic Train Control system. Three different families exist, which are technically unrelated.

== EBICab 500/600 ==
EBICab 500 is Bombardier's implementation of the German PZB, the train protection system widely used in Germany, Austria and other countries, allowing operation up to 160 km/h.

EBICab 600 is Bombardier's implementation of the German PZB and LZB as a combined STM. The LZB is used on high-speed tracks in Germany, up to 300 km/h.

== EBICab 700/900 ==
EBICab 700 was originally derived from Ericsson's SLR system in Sweden. Most trains in Sweden and Norway use a similar on-board system, Ansaldo L10000 (more known as ATC-2) from Bombardier's competitor Ansaldo STS (now Hitachi Rail STS). ATC-2 was also developed in Sweden.

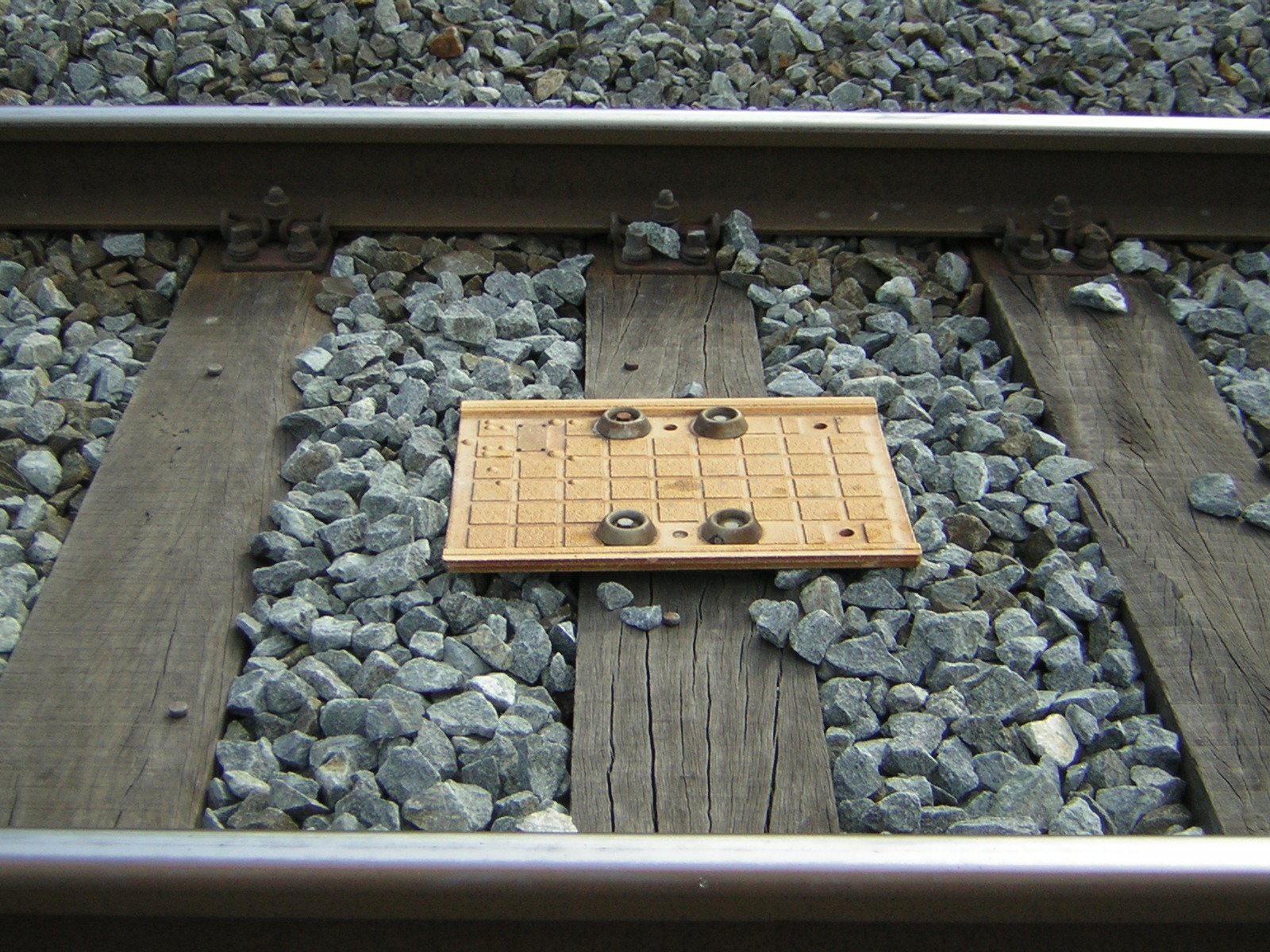
EBICab balise in the Mediterranean Corridor

These on-board systems use pairs of balises mounted on the sleepers. The pairs of balises distinguish signals in one direction from the other direction with semicontinuous speed supervision, using a wayside to train punctual transmission using wayside transponders.

=== Versions ===
EBICab comes in two versions, EBICab 700 in Sweden, Norway, Portugal and Bulgaria and EBICab 900 installed in the Spanish Mediterranean Corridor (v_{max}= 220 km/h), and in Finland (Finnish: Junakulunvalvonta) under the name ATP-VR/RHK. In Portugal it is known as Convel (the contraction of Controlo de Velocidade, meaning Speed Control).

The EBICab 900 system uses wayside balises with signal encoders or series communications with electronic lookup table, and on-board equipment on the train. The transmission of data occurs between the passive wayside balises (between 2 and 4 per signal) and the antenna installed under the train, which powers the balises when it passes over the balises. The coupling between the balise and the on-board antenna is inductive.

In comparison with ASFA, a system which transmits only a limited amount of data per frequency, EBICAB uses an electronic lookup table, allowing for a much larger amount of data transmitted.

Adif/Renfe, in Spain, sometimes use the term ATP to refer to EBICAB 900, which is the first system on its network to provide Automatic Train Protection. The Manila MRT Line 3 in the Philippines also uses the ATP term to refer to EBICAB 900.

=== Main Characteristics ===
- Transponders operating in the ISM band at 27 MHz amplitude modulated for the clock pulses and impulse frequency of 50 kHz.
- Transmission of data to trains at 4,5 MHz at 50 kbit/s with 32 bit packets encoding 12 bits of information (EBICAB 700) or 255 bit packets encoding 180 bits of information (EBICab 900), including the necessary synchronisation bits.
- The signals are linked (concatenated), but the signs, for example, for warnings and speed, are not necessarily linked (concatenated); it is acceptable to have 50% of the transponders linked to be safe against failures.
- The driver may input characteristics such as train identification, length, speed type, maximum speed, braking characteristics, and train pressure.
- The driver receives visual indications such as speed limit, target speed, overspeed, ASFA Alarm, braking reset, Permission to Pass, alarm signals, braking warning, red or alphanumeric indications.

=== Supervision ===
- Line velocity, as a function of line capacity and the vehicle's performance capabilities in situations of overspeed or the imposition of lower velocity for some types of trains.
- Multiple objectives, including signaling information without wayside signals.
- The system can enforce permanent, temporary and emergency speed restrictions by using unlinked (concatenated) transponders.
- Stop Point.
- Dynamic braking profile.
- Status of the level crossing and landslide detectors.
- Maneuvers.
- Protection against wheel wear.
- Slip/Slide compensation.
- Authorization to pass a signal at Stop.

=== Warnings ===
- Acoustic warning at excess of 5 km/h, service braking at excess of 10 km/h and emergency brake application at excess of 15 km/h
- The operator may release service braking when the speed is below one of the speed limits (Normally below the speed limit + 10 km/h in Portugal).

=== Differences ===
The most important difference with EBICab 900, is that EBICab 700 can only transmit packets with 12 useful bits for a total of 32bits and allows up to 5 transponders per signal.

== EBICab 2000 ==
The EBICab 2000 is Bombardier's implementation of a ETCS, operated in several European countries (Germany, Switzerland, United Kingdom, Belgium, Netherlands, Spain, Sweden, Poland). It can read Eurobalises and can communicate by Euroradio with a RBC.

== See also ==
- Advanced Civil Speed Enforcement System
- Automatic Train Protection
- European Train Control System
