= Crocodile (train protection system) =

Railway safety device

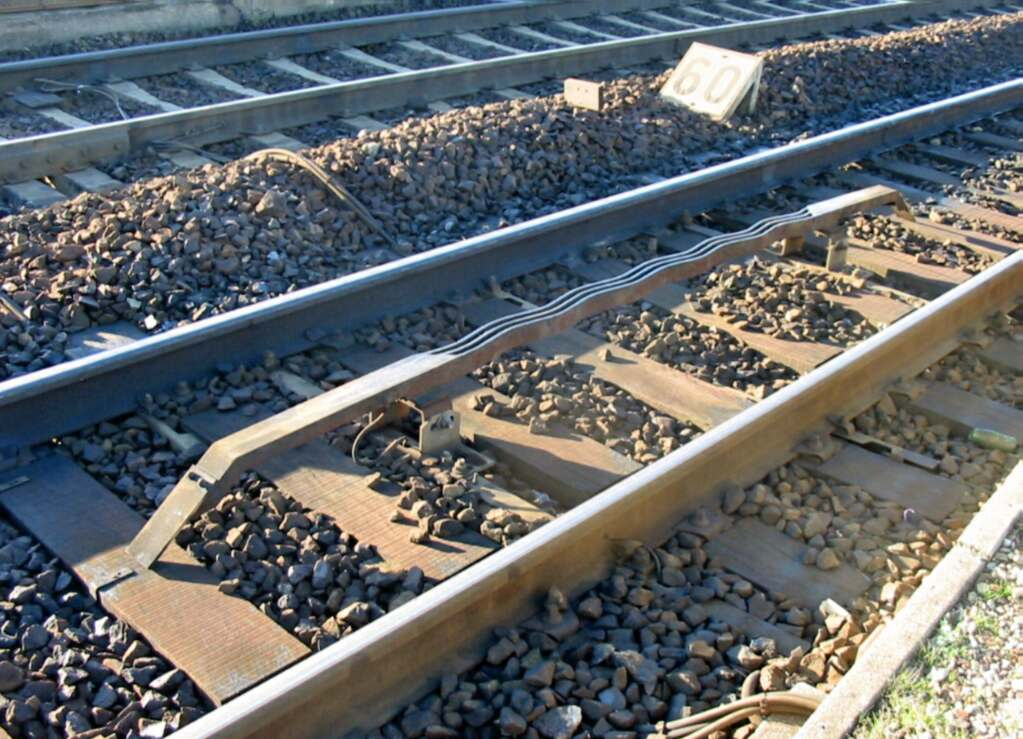
A crocodile, fixed between rails

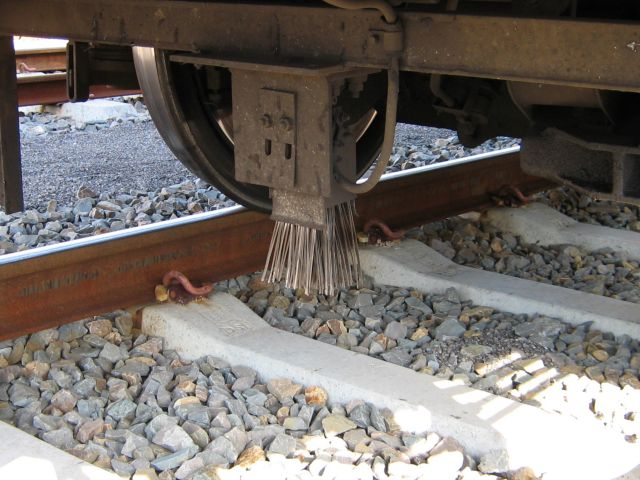
A corresponding train-mounted brush

A crocodile is a component of train protection systems used in France and Belgium. It works similarly to the Automatic Warning System (AWS) used in the United Kingdom.

The crocodile can provide two different pieces of information to the driver, according to the aspect of the corresponding signal:

- The répétition signal fermé (which literally means "repetition of closed signal"), corresponding to a caution or danger signal, applies a +20 V voltage to the crocodile, causing a warning horn to beep in the driver's cab. Then, unless the driver pushes the acknowledgement button within five seconds, the emergency brakes are applied automatically.
- The répétition signal ouvert (which literally means "repetition of opened signal"), corresponding to a proceed signal, applies a −20 V voltage to the crocodile, causing a bell to ring in the driver's cab for old machines.

Communication between the ground-based signalling system and the in-cab equipment is made by the crocodile, an electrical contact placed between the rails and a metallic brush mounted beneath the locomotive cab. It is distinctively French, originating on the Chemins de fer du Nord around 1872, spreading throughout France and penetrating into Belgium and Luxembourg after 1900.

The crocodile is an invention of the engineers Lartigue and Forest. Originally it was placed 100–200 metres (110–220 yd) in front of a distant signal, usually a red disc of "deferred stop". When recording of cab signals was introduced, the device was moved closer to the signal, most often directly opposite it, to reduce the chance of a change of the signal between the time the locomotive passed over the crocodile and when the locomotive actually passed the signal. If a signal changed suddenly to a caution or danger aspect in the face of the driver, it would appear that they had not noticed it and had been surprised, when that was not the case.

== History ==
During 1872, the crocodile signal repetition system was invented by the French engineers Lartigue and Forest, employees of the Compagnie des chemins de fer du Nord. By 1880, the Compagnie du Nord had furnished all of its double-tracked lines with the apparatus, however, the other French railway companies were resistant to the implementation of such a system on their lines, in spite of a series of accidents that the presence of crocodile may have prevented.

Finally, in response to the Perrigny accident of 5 February 1920, France's Minister of Public Works, Albert-André Claveille, issued a pair of instructions that same year to all railway companies, urging them to implement signal repetition, and giving companies an deadline of 1 August 1922 to implement the system. During 1925, France's railways had uniformly adopted the crocodile system. Even into the early twenty-first century, the crocodile has remained in commonplace use on many of France's conventional lines (e.g. those using fixed conventional signalling).

The Crocodile was also introduced in several of France's neighbours, such as Belgium. Even the fairly modern TBL 1+ system, the rollout of which started in 2007, made use of the crocodile. In 1973, Luxembourg introduced the crocodile upon its railways. Between 2004 and 2019, the improved Memor II+ system was rolled out across Luxembourg's rail network; this used either a single, or a pair of, crocodiles for each signal. This system was a temporary measure prior to the introduction of the more capable and newer European Train Control System (ETCS).
