= Anuncio de Señales y Frenado Automático =

Spanish train protection system

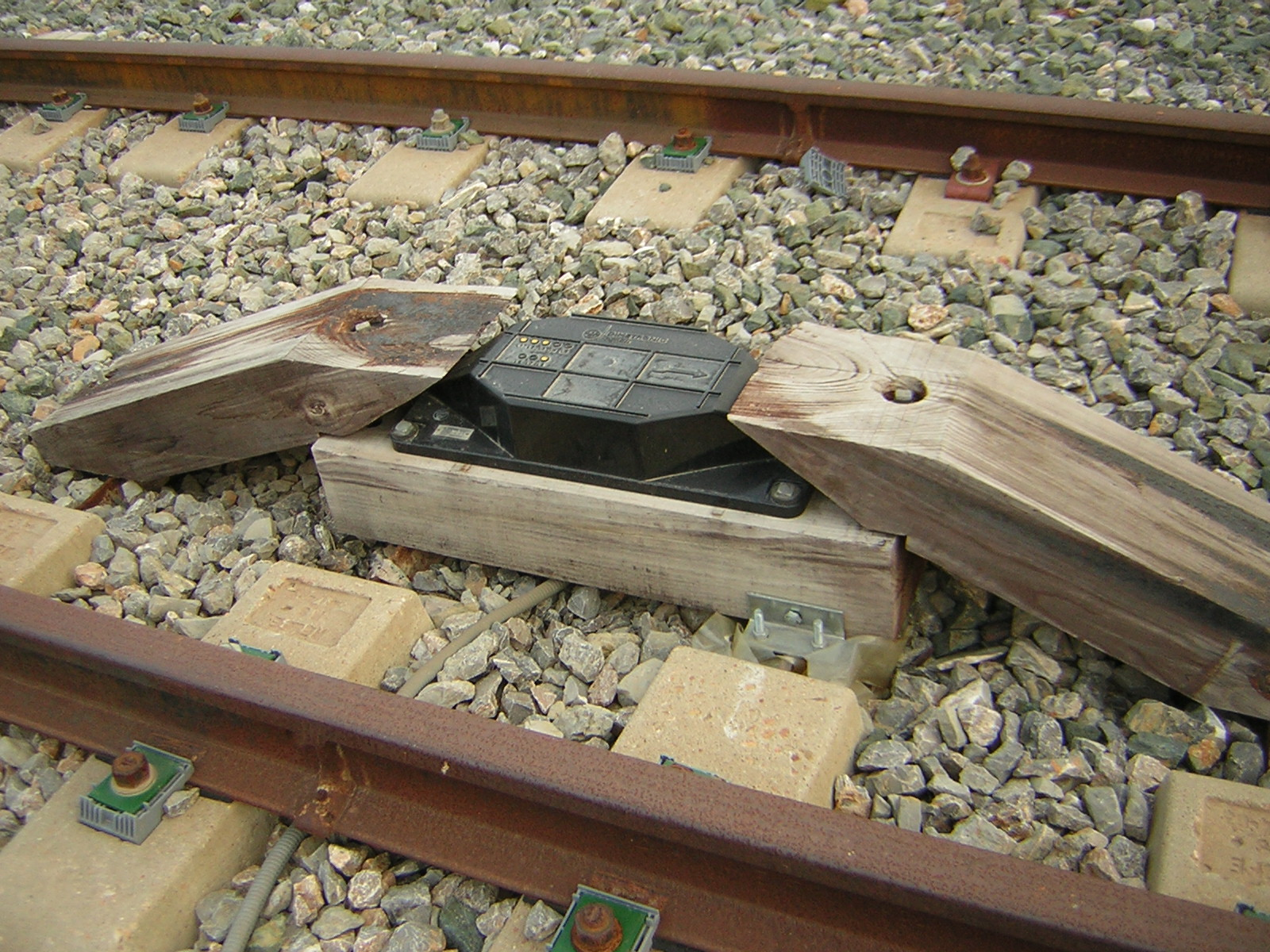
Track-mounted balise used for ASFA

Anuncio de Señales y Frenado Automático (ASFA; "Announcement of Signals and Automatic Braking") is an Automatic Train Protection system widely deployed on the Spanish rail network. It consists of a mechanism that stops a train if the driver does not properly heed signals.

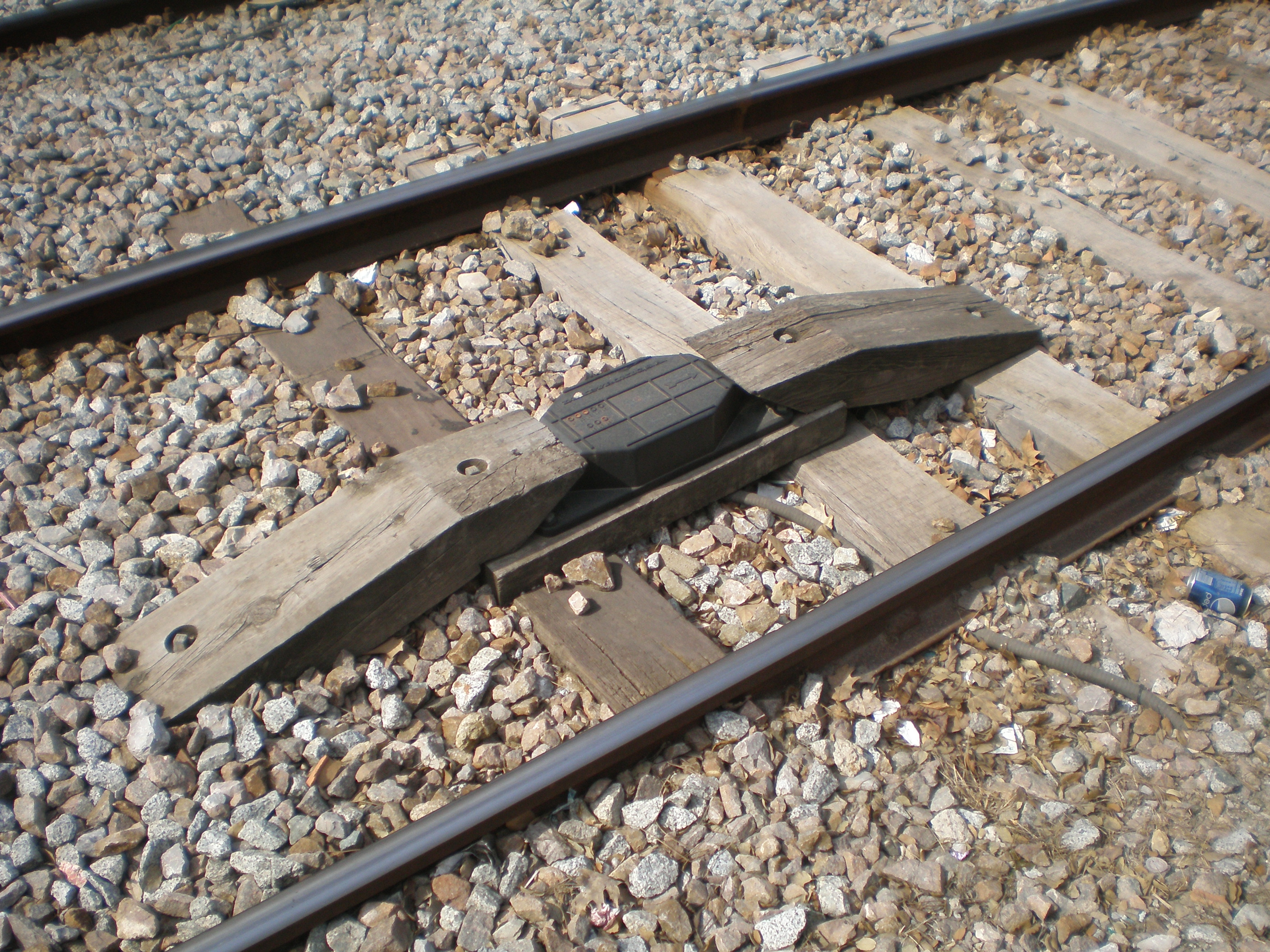
Track-mounted balise used for ASFA in Mollet-Santa Rosa railway station Mollet del Vallès, Catalonia

== Operation ==
ASFA makes use of inductive coupling between a transceiver on the rolling stock and a balise (tuned electronic beacon) that oscillates at one of nine preset frequencies when activated by a magnetic field emanating from said transceiver. The balise requires no external power, however, there is a cable for controlling small relays inside the transponder which switch capacitors in/out of the coil circuit and determine which frequency is detected by the passing train. The nine frequencies lie in the 60-100 kHz range (although only five frequencies are used in ASFA) and the wayside balises are mounted between the rails offset from the track centerline to provide directionality. Each balise is protected from debris strikes by a wooden ramp on each side and are typically placed at distances of about 5 and 300 meters before a signal.

Number	Frequency	Indication
L1	60 kHz	Approach Stop signal/Unprotected level crossing/temporary speed limit < 60 km/h
L2	64 kHz	Proceed at authorized speed
L3	68.3 kHz	Proceed, level crossing protections active

Number	Frequency	Indication
L7	88.5 kHz	Proceed under speed control
L8	95.5 kHz	Stop
Alarm	99.3 kHz	Error

The frequency picked up by the transceiver is sent to the driver's cab. In the cab, a light signal is activated and sometimes play a sound that indicates the status of the signal. The train driver must press and release a button within three seconds to acknowledge the signal. Trains passing a signal at "Caution" will receive a speed control indication requiring the train to reduce speed until it passes the 300 meter balise at which point it will be required to reduce speed further or be released to proceed at normal speed. If power is lost the balise defaults to the most restrictive condition. If the signal indicates any reduction in speed, the train must slow down to the required speed limit in time, otherwise the emergency brakes are automatically applied. The emergency braking occurs when a train passes a signal at danger or if a previous balise signal indicates a stop at the next signal and the speed at which the train is travelling is more than that required to stop the train.

If an automatic brake application occurs due to a violation of an ASFA signal, the train has to come to a complete halt and a manual reset of the ASFA system in the train must be performed.

== Implementation ==
ASFA is a development of the Westcab intermittent train control technology commercialized by WABCO's Italian subsidiary and licensed to Dimetal of Spain for use on various Iberian rail systems. RENFE, the Spanish state-owned railway operator, was put in charge of the rail system in 1975. Before this, the rail networks of other countries had previously deployed similar systems which gave ASFA a technological advantage over its competitors.

It was progressively rolled out on all of the lines belonging to RENFE beginning with the principal lines and extending to practically the entire Spanish rail network totaling over 13,000 km of track, leaving few lines without ASFA installed. It is also widely deployed on narrow gauge railways belonging to FEVE and Ferrocarrils de la Generalitat Valenciana.

In 2005 Adif, the state-owned Administrator of Rail Infrastructure, began a systemic renewal process which would become known as "ASFA Digital". The changes in the new system do not affect the balises, which continue to transmit their information in analogue form, but rather just the signal processing equipment in the train which once digitalised will allow for the use of braking curves or a better representation of the received signals in the cabin.

== Interoperability ==
The need for interoperability between the rail networks of various countries has caused the European Union to consider restricting the use of systems like ASFA which cannot be recognised by trains from foreign countries on the Spanish railway network. Because of this, the European Train Control System is being progressively phased in. The ETCS has a method of information transmission very similar to ASFA in the Level 1 portion of its specification, but ETCS is more technologically advanced and more secure. Both systems are compatible with each other and can be used on the same line simultaneously.

== Types of ASFA ==
The different types of ASFA are as follows:

- ASFA "clásico" ("classic") supports speeds up to 160 km/h (100 mph)
- ASFA FAP (version specific to Ferrocarrils de la Generalitat de Catalunya's Línia Llobregat-Anoia)
- ASFA 200 supports speeds up to 200 km/h (125 mph)
- ASFA 200 AVE
- ASFA digital

== See also ==
- Rail transport in Spain
