= Advanced Train Control System =

US railway signaling standard

An Advanced Train Control System (ATCS) is a North American system of railroad equipment designed to ensure safety by monitoring locomotive and train locations, providing analysis and reporting, automating track warrants, detecting blind spot and similar orders.

ATCS specifications are published by the Association of American Railroads (AAR), and are designed to document the stated requirements of railway/railroad operational and technical professionals concerning ATCS hardware and software.

== Principles ==
The basic principle behind ATCS is to provide a cost efficient, safe, modular, train control system with an open architecture. The primary goals of the system are to provide for

- compatibility of systems across railroads. This helps to ensure seamless operation. For example, locomotives from one railroad will be able to communicate, via data radio, with dispatch centers from other roads when operating on their track. Certain baselines, such as standard communications protocols and message formats, have been developed to ensure this goal is met.
- the ability for each railroad to selectively implement the capabilities and features it needs. Full-fledged ATCS implementation on an entire railroad is not always appropriate or feasible. ATCS has been designed to allow for selective implementation on various parts of a railroad.
- a modular growth path from less capable implementations to more capable implementations. This eliminates the need for an "all-at-once" approach that would be difficult and expensive to achieve. In fact, railroads can implement ATCS at a rate that makes sense from both the service and fiscal points of view.
- the ability to implement a system with components from different suppliers. This relieves the railroads of the need to purchase potentially expensive and complex converters that are often needed to interconnect and interface various vendor components. As a result, user costs should be reduced by providing for expanded sources of supply.

== ATCS functions ==
The primary ATCS functions are:

- management of track occupancies through centralized route and block interlocking logic;
- issuance of movement authorities via the data link to equipped trains and work vehicles, and via voice radio to unequipped trains and work vehicles;
- tracking of equipped train location and track occupancies via the data link, and unequipped train location and track occupancies via voice reports and manual entry;
- speed enforcement for equipped trains;
- enforcement of limits of authority for equipped trains;
- pacing for fuel economy for equipped trains;
- monitoring and control of wayside systems;
- reporting of equipped train diagnostics and operating parameters; and
- general exchange of instructions and messages.

== Systems ==
The ATCS architecture consists of five major systems. Four of these systems are the information processing systems that reside at the central dispatch office (the Central Dispatch Computer), on-board locomotives (the On-Board Computer), on-board work vehicles (the Track Forces Terminal) and in the field (the Wayside Interface Unit). These systems collect, process, and distribute data with minimal input from dispatchers, enginemen, and foremen. The fifth system and the ATCS keystone, is the modern data communications system, which ties the various information processing systems together and significantly reduces the need for voice communications.

ATCS has been designed for modular expansion, which allows for varying levels of operational sophistication. Three basic levels of operation have been identified, although many hybrid configurations are expected in actual installations.

The Base Communications Packages (BCP) interface the ground segment to the RF segment of the communications system. Mobile Communications Packages (MCP) interface clients to the RF segment of the communications system or (optionally) to the ground system directly. MCP clients include wayside interface units, on-board computers, and track forces terminals. The RF segment operates at 4800 bits per second in the 900 MHZ radio band.

The Association of American Railroads' Task Force on Locomotive Systems Integration (LSI) has the mission to "develop a practical approach to the integration of the new electronic and mechanical components on locomotives" (per Minutes of Locomotive Systems Integration Committee Briefing to Locomotive Suppliers, September 5, 1991, Montreal, Quebec, dated September 11, 1991). An architecture to achieve this mission has evolved in the LSI Specifications which describe multiple configurations of electronic and mechanical components in a locomotive cab.

== See also ==
- Positive train control
- Train protection system
