= RS4 Codici =

Italian train protection system

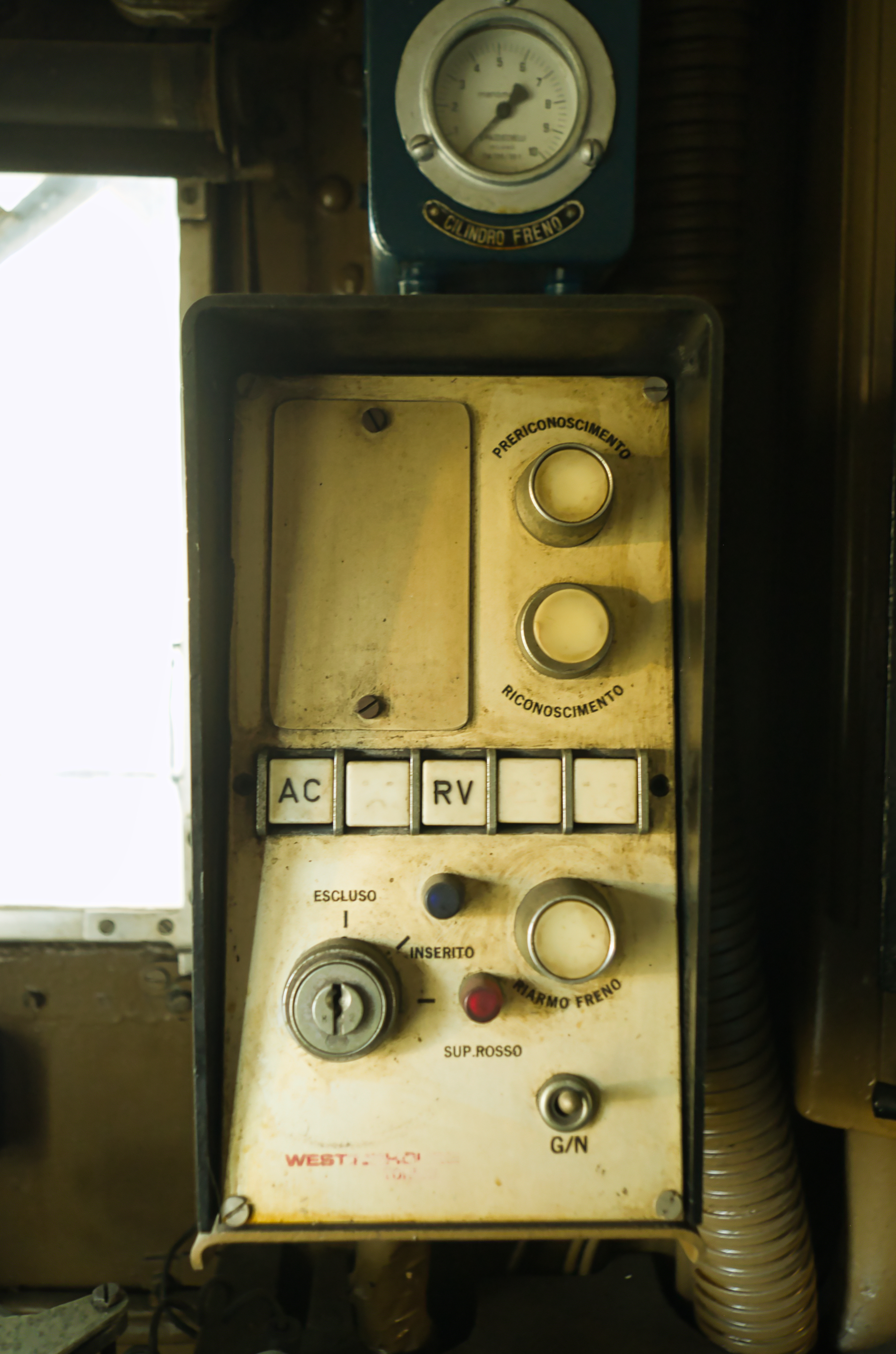
Westinghouse-type Continuous Signal Repeater dashboard in the cabin of E.326.004, preserved at the National Railway Museum of Pietrarsa

RS4 Codici is a train protection system used in Italy. The term is an abbreviation of Ripetizione Segnali a 4 codici (signal repetition system with 4 codes).

It is a simple cab signalling system, displaying the aspect of the next (and, in some cases, the next but one) signal. It helps the driver to reliably determine the aspect of the next signal even in poor visibility and at high velocities.

The information is conveyed via amplitude modulation of a 50 Hz alternating current of the Blocco Automatico a Correnti Codificate (BAcc) in the rails. Receiver coils in front of the first axle of a locomotive or control car are used to detect the signal. As trains got faster, an additional set of codes sent with a 178 Hz carrier were added. The new system was backward compatible with the old four-code system as trains unable to receive the 178 Hz codes would be relegated to a slower speed.
