= Signum =

Signum is Latin for "sign" and may refer to:

== Brands and companies ==
- Integra Signum, a (defunct) Swiss railroad signaling company
  - Integra-Signum, a train protection system
- Opel Signum, an Opel car model
- Signum Biosciences, a company based in New Jersey
- Signum (typeface), a 1955 typeface designed by Georg Trump for the Weber Typefoundry

== Media ==
- Signum (magazine), a German literary magazine
- Signum (musical group), a trance music group
- Signum (Nanoha), a character from the Magical Girl Lyrical Nanoha series
- Signum Quartet, a string quartet based in Cologne, Germany
- Signum Records, a classical music record label in the UK

== Other uses ==
- Signum, part of Roman naming conventions
- Signum, an alternative name for some Roman Republic army units
- Signum (anatomy), a part of the female Lepidoptera genitalia
- Signum function or sign function in mathematics
- Signum manus, type of signature
- Signum (blockchain)
- Signum University, an online educational institution
- Signum, a battalion of the 93rd Mechanized Brigade (Ukraine)
