= GNT (disambiguation) =

GNT may refer to:

- GNT, a Brazilian television channel
- George Negus Tonight, an Australian television program
- Geschwindigkeitsüberwachung Neigetechnik, a German train safety system
- Good News Translation, a Bible translation
- Grand National Teams, a North American bridge tournament
- Grand National Trunk road, in Eluru, Andhra Pradesh, India
- Gendarmerie Nationale Togolaise, a branch of the Togolese armed forces
- Guntai language
- Gunton railway station, in England
- Guntur Junction railway station, in Andhra Pradesh, India
- Gwent (preserved county), Wales, Chapman code
- Guanitoxin, a Cyanobacterial toxin
