= Fire Station Junction =

- Fire Station Center
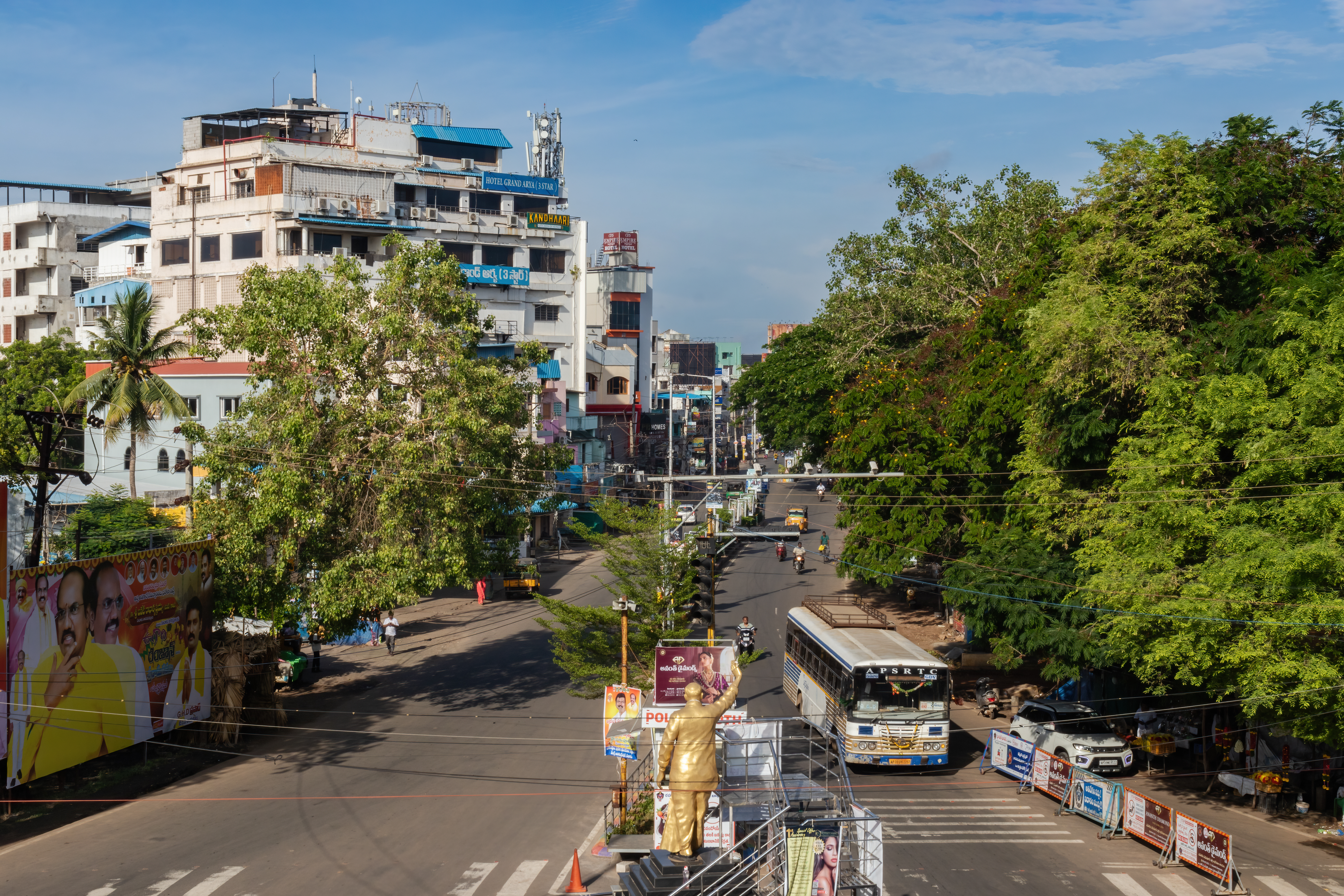

Location
- Eluru, Andhra Pradesh
- Coordinates: 16.710720°N 81.094421°E
- Roads at junction: Grand National Trunk road Sanivarapupeta road

Construction
- Type: Roundabout

Fire Station Junction is one of the busiest chowks (roundabout / traffic circle) and a prominent landmark located on Grand National Trunk road in the Indian City of Eluru, Andhra Pradesh. Two Major Arterial roads Grand National Trunk road and Sanivarapupeta road intersect at this junction.

== Traffic ==
Fire Station Junction is one of the Busiest Junctions in Eluru. Sanivarapupeta road intersects with Grand National Trunk road at this Junction.
