= Wulf Kirsten =

German writer (1934–2022)

Wulf Kirsten (21 June 1934 – 14 December 2022) was a German poet, novelist, and publisher. He is known for his nature poetry and his essays on the history and culture of Saxony.

The son of a stonemason, Kirsten was born in Klipphausen, Meissen on 21 June 1934. He worked as salesman, bookkeeper and labourer before graduating from the Workers' and Farmers' College (Arbeiter- und Bauern-Fakultät) of Leipzig in 1960, and then completed a teaching degree in German and Russian in 1964. At the same time he worked on a freelance basis for the compilers of the Dictionary of the Upper Saxon Dialects, providing them with more than a thousand words from his own household.

After obtaining his degree, he worked briefly as a teacher, and then in 1965 moved to Weimar to work for the Aufbau Verlag publishing house, where he would stay until 1987. To further his career as a poet, in the years 1969 and 1970 Kirsten spent nine months studying at the Johannes R. Becher Institute of Literature, under the tutelage of Heinz Czechowski and Georg Maurer.

Between 1968 and 1977, he wrote several volumes of poetry, followed in 1984 by a volume of two prose works. Much of the poetry is collected in die erde bei Meißen (1986), which received the Peter Huchel Prize in 1987, and helped introduce him to West German audiences.

During the upheavals of 1989 and 1990, Kirsten became involved in the New Forum at Weimar, but he was quickly disillusioned and retired from political activism. Between 1992 and 2010 he published his work through Ammann Verlag in Zürich, which issued his collected works in 2004 under the title Erdlebenbilder.

Kirsten lived in Weimar. He died on 14 December 2022, at the age of 88.

== Selected works ==
- Poesiealbum 4. Wulf Kirsten. Berlin 1968.
- satzanfang. gedichte. Berlin/Weimar 1970.
- Ziegelbrennersprache. Gedichte. Darmstadt 1974.
- der landgänger. Gedichte. Düsseldorf/Krefeld 1976, ISBN 3-922690-12-2.
- Die Schlacht bei Kesselsdorf – Ein Bericht. Kleewunsch – Ein Kleinstadtbild. Berlin/Weimar 1984.
- der bleibaum. gedichte. Berlin/Weimar 1977.
- die erde bei Meißen. Gedichte. Frankfurt/M. 1987, ISBN 3-518-04424-9.
- Winterfreuden. Zwei Prosatexte. Warmbronn 1987, ISBN 3-924316-19-8.
- Veilchenzeit. Gedichte. Warmbronn 1989.
- Stimmenschotter. Gedichte. Zürich 1993, ISBN 3-250-10206-7.
- Textur. Reden und Aufsätze. Zürich 1998, ISBN 3-250-10394-2.
- Wettersturz. Gedichte. Zürich 1999, ISBN 3-250-10402-7.
- Die Prinzessinnen im Krautgarten. Eine Dorfkindheit. Zürich 2000, ISBN 3-492-23652-9.
- Zwischen Standort und Blickfeld. Gedichte und Paraphrasen. Warmbronn 2001, ISBN 3-932843-24-X.
- Der Berg über der Stadt. Zwischen Goethe und Buchenwald. Zürich 2003 (with Harald Wenzel-Orf), ISBN 3-250-10431-0.
- Erdlebenbilder. Gedichte aus fünfzig Jahren. 1954–2004, Zürich 2004, ISBN 3-250-10464-7.
- Steinmetzgarten. Das Uhrmacherhaus. Zwei Erzählungen. Warmbronn 2004, ISBN 3-932843-70-3.
- Brückengang. Reden und Essays. Zürich 2009, ISBN 978-3-250-30025-0.
- Graviers (choix de poèmes). Collection „L'Extrême Contemporain“, ed. Stéphane Michaud, Paris 2009.

== Bibliography ==
- Reinhard Kiefer: Wulf Kirsten. Textlandschaft als poetologisches Paradigma. In: Landschaftstext und Textlandschaft. Stationen des deutschen Landschaftsgedichts 1945-1980 bei Wilhelm Lehmann, Peter Huchel und Wulf Kirsten. Habil. unveröff., Aachen, 1996, S. 349-450
- Anke Degenkolb: „anzuschreiben gegen das schäbige vergessen.“ Erinnern und Gedächtnis in Wulf Kirstens Lyrik. Berlin 2004, ISBN 3-8325-0509-1
- Gerhard R. Kaiser Hg.: Landschaft als literarischer Text. Der Dichter Wulf Kirsten. Jena 2004, ISBN 3-931743-70-5
- Stéphane Michaud Hg.: Quatre poètes dans l'Europe monde. Yves Bonnefoy, Michel Deguy, Márton Kalász, Wulf Kirsten, Klincksieck, Paris 2009, ISBN 978-2-252-03722-5
- Wulf Kirsten 75 Jahre. Signum. Blätter für Literatur und Kritik. 10. Jg. Sonderheft 12, Sommer 2009
  - Rezension: Zs. "Zwischenwelt. Literatur, Widerstand, Exil." Hg. Theodor Kramer Gesellschaft Graz, 26. Jg., Dez. 2009, Nr. 3/4, S. 77f. ISSN 1606-4321
- Elisabeth Weyer: In Sachsen und Thüringen. Der Schriftsteller Wulf Kirsten. Produktion BR 2001, broadcast on 24 March 2001
