= Geschwindigkeitsüberwachung Neigetechnik =

Train protection system

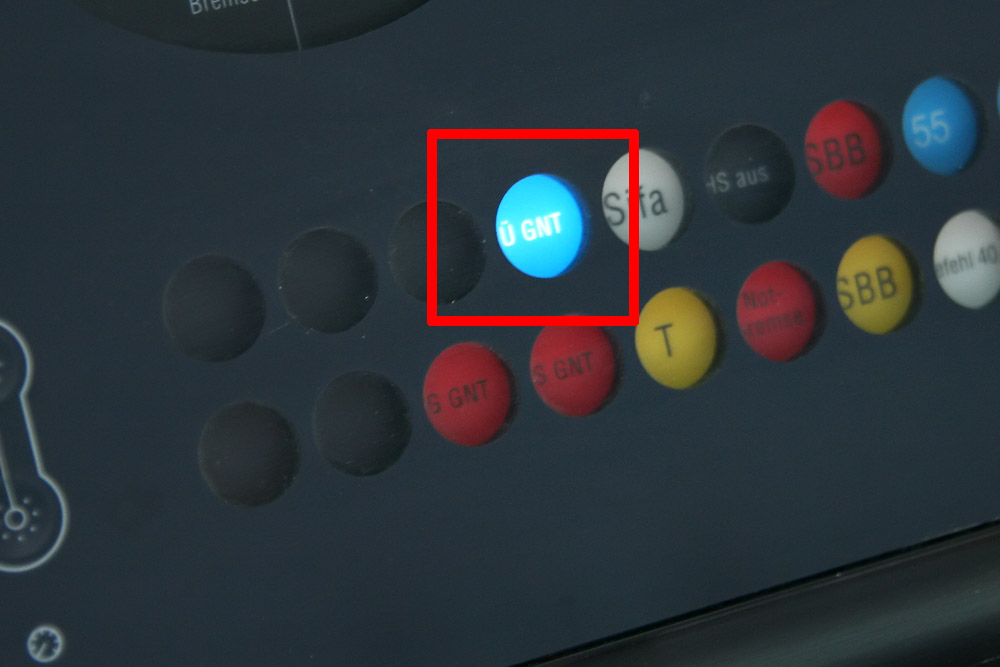
GNT is active

The train protection system Geschwindigkeitsüberwachung Neigetechnik (German, translated "Speed Control for Tilting Technology") (abbr. GNT) enables to rise the speed of tilting trains until 30 % above the limits for conventional trains. It is installed on numerous lines in Germany along with the traditional Punktförmige Zugbeeinflussung (PZB) intermittent signalling system.

== History ==
Prior to GNT the tilting control was added as a subset of the Linienzugbeeinflussung (LZB) train protection system that has been in service on high-speed lines since the 1960s. It turned out that the switch from PZB to LZB on some regional lines was considered to be too expensive. As such Siemens was tasked to provide ZUB balises that would work on top of the existing line side signalling and their PZB controlled restrictions. It was developed and introduced under the title Punktförmiges Datenübertragungs-System (transl. "Punctiform Data Transfer System"). Because of conflicts of the abbreviation PDS with a political party PDS, it was changed in 1990.

The first train-born equipment was added to 20 trains of DB Class 610 which were operated on lines in Upper Franconia and Upper Palatinate since May 1992. The original system is based on the Siemens ZUB 122 system which uses balises that are put next to the PZB indusi inductors on the outer side of the rails.

The second generation of GNT has switched to the Siemens ZUB 262 system which is based on Eurobalises being under test since 1997. The functionality has not changed however and the balises work in conjunction with the PZB train protection system. The development of EuroZUB for the Swiss network had been the original cause with an expectation that a switch to ETCS would be made soon. The German network operator Deutsche Bahn has ensured that tilting information was finally added to the European Train Control System (ETCS) in version 3.4.0 (like it has done and never used in LZB). In the ETCS mode L2 all information for speed allowance is provided by Radio Block Center (RBC), so there are no additional balises needed and GNT is obvious. In mode ETCS L1 Limited Supervision (L1LS) as a successor of PZB it is possible to deploy GNT in the same manner like ZUB 262 before.

In 2014 the DB Class 610 were put out of service. The DB Class 611 had been partly converted from ZUB 122 to ZUB 262 but they have ended their regular service at the end of 2017. All other tilting trains in Germany are based on ZUB 262 with a Eurobalise antenna. This includes the successor DB Class 612 as well as the series of ICE T (Class 411 and 415) and ICE TD (Class 605) trains.

== Description ==
In general the GNT ZUB balises are placed slightly before the PZB inductor signalling an override speed information so that the traditional PZB on-board system is temporarily disabled at that PZB control point. In the first generation the ZUB 122 and PZB balises were put next to each other using the same installation pattern on the outer side of the rails and connecting to the same line side signal. The second generation ZUB 262 places the balise in the middle of the rail as any other Eurobalise.

While the GNT system allows a maximum of 50 km/h (31 mph) extra speed over the normal line speed it is still restricted to a maximum of 160 km/h (99 mph) as the traditional line side signalling is used for train operation. Running a train on-sight is limited to that speed throughout Germany. In current practice the system allows up to 30 % more speed in curves thereby limiting the lateral acceleration to a maximum of 1.0 m/s². In current operation the tilting functionality is only activated on trains running more than 70 km/h (43 mph).

If the GNT system is switched off then the PZB signals are used to control the line speed. Trains without GNT can use the same lines as they respond to the existing PZB control. If the following PZB point is missing then a GNT equipped train is limited to 100 km/h (62 mph).

== Deployment ==
=== Rolling stock ===
In Germany, the following Deutsche Bahn trains are equipped with GNT:

- Class 411 (7-car ICE T) / Class 415 (5-car ICE T) based on Siemens ZUB 262 vehicle equipment
- Class 605 (ICE TD) based on Siemens ZUB 262 vehicle equipment
- Class 610 ("Pendolino") based on Siemens ZUB 122 vehicle equipment
- Class 611 based on Siemens ZUB 122 vehicle equipment and partially converted based on Siemens ZUB 262
- Class 612 ("Regioswinger") based on Siemens ZUB 262 vehicle equipment

The ICE T trains sold by Deutsche Bahn to the Austrian Federal Railways were initially the only GNT-equipped vehicles that did not belong to DB. Because the RABe 503 of the Swiss Federal Railways run at high speed on the Munich–Lindau–Zurichroute, they also had to be equipped with ZUB 262.

=== Routes ===
Most lines with Siemens ZUB 122 exist in Southern Germany from Basel to Stuttgart, Frankfurt, Nürnberg, Regensburg.

The lines with Siemens ZUB 262 may exist alongside to the ZUB 122 equipment with new lines extending north to Erfurt and Leipzig in eastern Germany and north to Goslar and Hildesheim in western Germany. Additional lines in southern Germany were connected like those to Passau and Ulm.

All lines equipped with GNT are shown in an interactive map on the internet by DB Netz AG.

== See also ==
- Tilt Authorisation and Speed Supervision for tilting control in the UK
