= Tilt Authorisation and Speed Supervision =

The Tilt Authorisation and Speed Supervision System, abbreviated as TASS, is an overlay to train protection systems allowing the control of speeds of tilting trains. It is only installed on the West Coast Main Line in the United Kingdom. Its trainborne part is fitted to British Rail Class 221 and Class 390s.

== History ==
The history of TASS is connected to the modernisation program of the West Coast Main Line conducted by Railtrack and successor Network Rail in the early 2000s. The modernisation plan included ambitious targets to increase the line speed from 110 mph (177 km/h) to 140 mph (225 km/h). This would include the use of tilting trains on the existing tracks.

The tilting train tender was won by Alstom with its Pendolino technology. The first batch of 53 Class 390s trains delivered between 2001 and 2004, did not differ heavily from the other Pendolino systems. They had been provided to areas with very different train protection systems before and there was a requirement to include features of the European Rail Traffic Management System at the time.

The system is based on Eurobalises to transmit an additional set of speed restrictions on top of the Automatic Warning System or Train Protection & Warning System. TASS allows a maximum of 25 mph (40 km/h) extra speed on sections with enough clearance for the tilting trains.

== See also ==
- C-APT - Control APT, a precursor of TASS developed for the Advanced Passenger Train
- Geschwindigkeitsüberwachung Neigetechnik (GNT) - tilting control based on Eurobalises for some lines in Germany
