= SZU Be 510 =

Swiss electric multiple unit

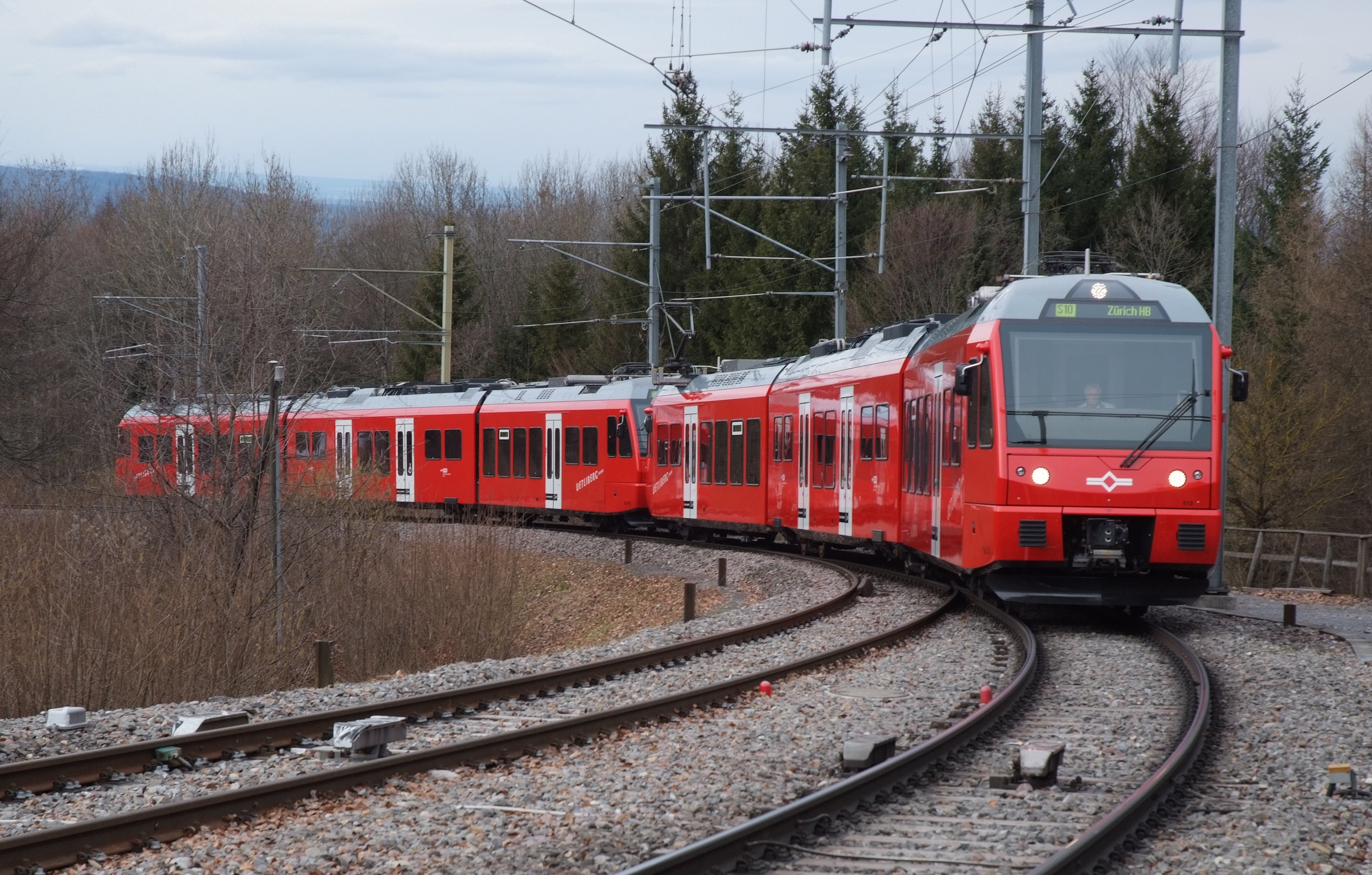
- Be 510
- Stock type: Electric multiple unit
- Manufacturer: Stadler Bussnang AG
- Constructed: 2013–2014, 2021–2022
- Number built: 6+5
- Fleet numbers: Be 552 511–516; Be 552 571–575; UIC numbering 94 85 7552 511-8 ... 516-7; 94 85 7552 571-2 ... 575-3
- Operators: Sihltal Zürich Uetliberg Bahn

Specifications
- Train length: 50,000 mm (164 ft 1/2 in)
- Width: 2,940 mm (9 ft 7 3/4 in)
- Wheel diameter: driving: 870 mm (34 in); carrying: 750 mm (30 in)
- Wheelbase: bogie: 2,100 mm (83 in); overall: 42,430 mm (139 ft 2 1/2 in)
- Maximum speed: 120 km/h (75 mph)
- Weight: empty: 93.0 t (91.5 long tons; 102.5 short tons)
- Traction motors: 4
- Power output: continuous:1,400 kW (1,900 hp)
- Tractive effort: starting: 160 kN (36,000 lb_{f})
- Electric system(s): 15 kV 16.7 Hz AC; 1200 V DC
- UIC classification: 2′Bo′Bo′2′
- Safety system(s): Signum, EuroZUB
- Coupling system: Schwab coupler
- Track gauge: 1,435 mm (4 ft 8 1/2 in)

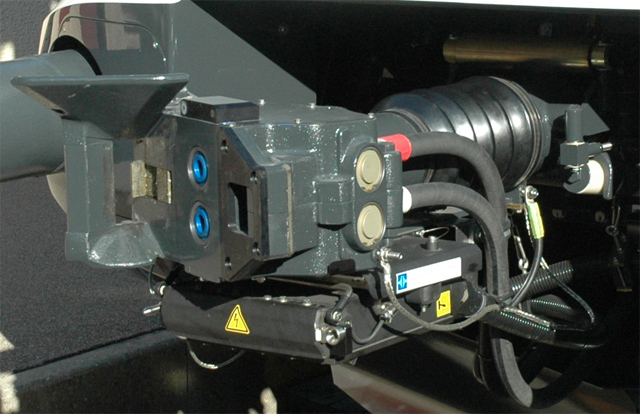
Schwab coupler type FK-15-10

Class SZU Be 510 designates a multi system EMU of the Swiss railway Sihltal Zürich Uetliberg Bahn (SZU), procured for the Uetliberg railway. These EMUs could operate on the former 1200 V DC electrification of the Uetliberg line and can run on AC lines such as the Sihl Valley line and the Uetliberg line converted to AC in 2022.

== History ==
The Be 510 EMUs were developed by Stadler Rail for the special requirements of SZU on the steep line to Uetliberg, at up to 7.9 % gradient. Sihltal line and Uetliberg line had different railway electrification system until 2022 but the two lines share the double track from Zurich Giesshübel through the underground Selnau station into the station under Bahnhofplatz, track 21 and 22 of Zurich main station. Whilst the Sihltal line uses the 15 kV AC system like all SBB lines, the Uetliberg line had a 1.2 kV DC overhead line which, looking uphill, is shifted 1.3 m (4 ft 3 in) to the right of track centre. Previous electric trains can run under one voltage only, AC trains collect power from the centre overhead, DC trains from the off centre contact line. The Be 510 trains were bought for the Uetliberg line, but to allow flexible operation and considering plans to convert the Uetliberg line to AC electrification, a multi system EMU was specified. With the pantograph in the centre standard 15 kV AC is drawn. The pantograph moved to the right allows collection of 1200 V DC, the unique supply up the Uetliberg line. These six EMUs were intended for the transition of the Uetliberg railway to AC overhead, a further five almost identical multi system EMUs were delivered in 2021 and 2022, the DC capability no longer being needed, but considered as a backdrop should the line’s AC conversion be delayed and safer than developing a new vehicle. A benefit of AC capability in the 2020s was that the new EMUs could be parked away from the DC depot, space there being scarce.

== Technical description ==
Each set consists of three car bodies, the middle has two motored bogies. Both end cars have one non-motored bogie at the outer end and are supported by the middle car at the inner end, like a Stadler GTW. All cars have low floor sections at the doors, rising over the bogies. Access from the platform is at level.

Traction equipment is concentrated in the middle car. Designing the car body to be strong enough to support transformer and air conditioning equipment on the roof whilst limiting the weight proved difficult, delaying delivery by about a year. Each end car has a driving positions and a pantograph. To allow lateral movement each pantograph is mounted on a sledge. At standstill the sledge can be moved by 1.3 m (4 ft 3 in) from the centre to the side. Contacts on the sledge engage with fixed contacts on the car roof to route the current to either the AC (centre position) or DC equipment. The pneumatic cylinder allows movement to the right only, but, should the EMU be turned, provision can be made for movement to the other side with a simple intervention at the workshop.

The vehicles can travel on the entire 15 kV AC network of the Swiss railways. They are equipped for multiple unit operation of up to three car sets. Platform restrictions limits train length to 100 m (328 ft 1 in) (two sets), normal operation on the Uetliberg line (S 10) is a rake of two Be 510 sets.

movable pantograph Be 510

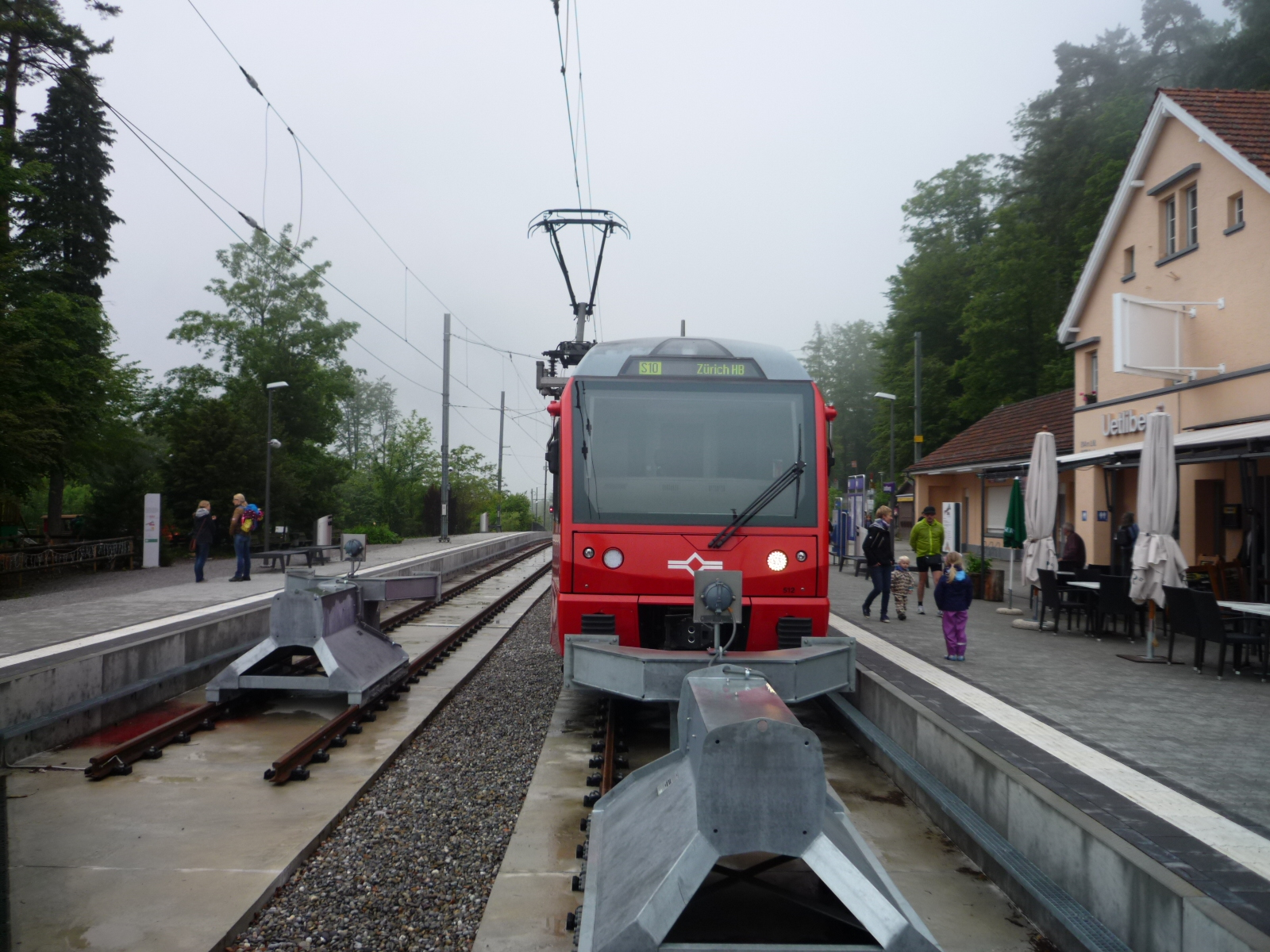
View from end of the line - pantograph shifted to left

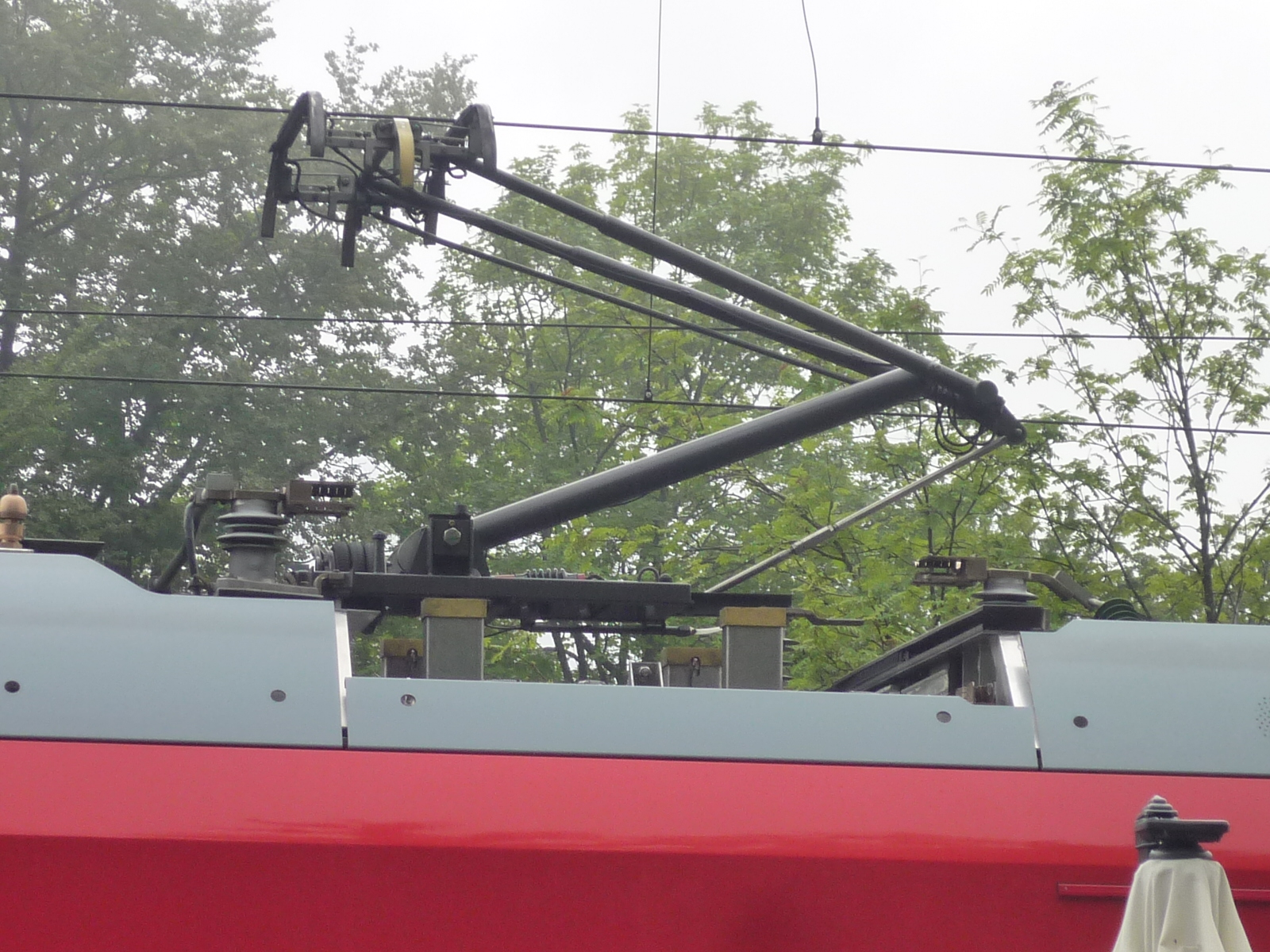
Close up of pantograph, DC position

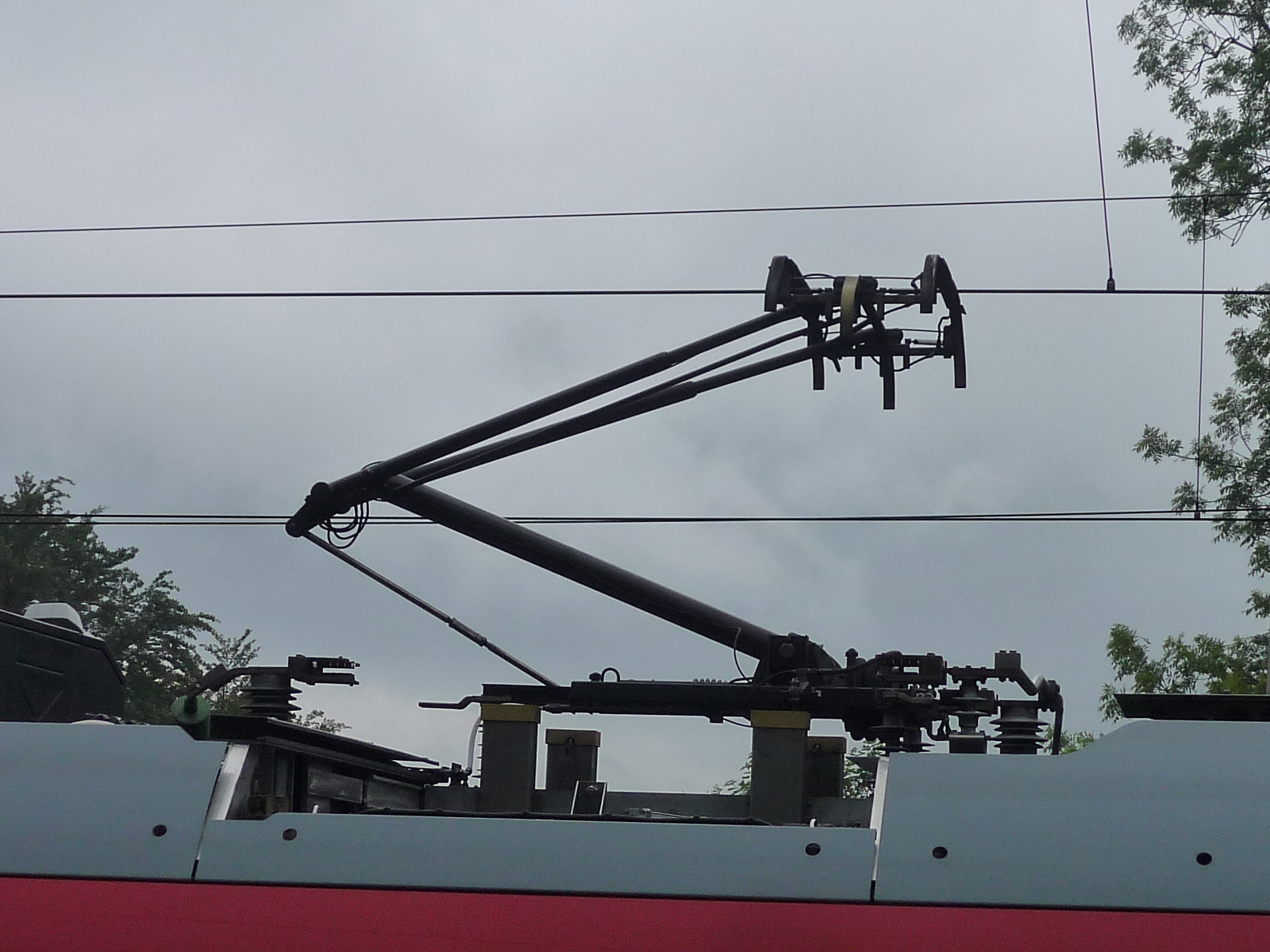
DC position, AC contact visible

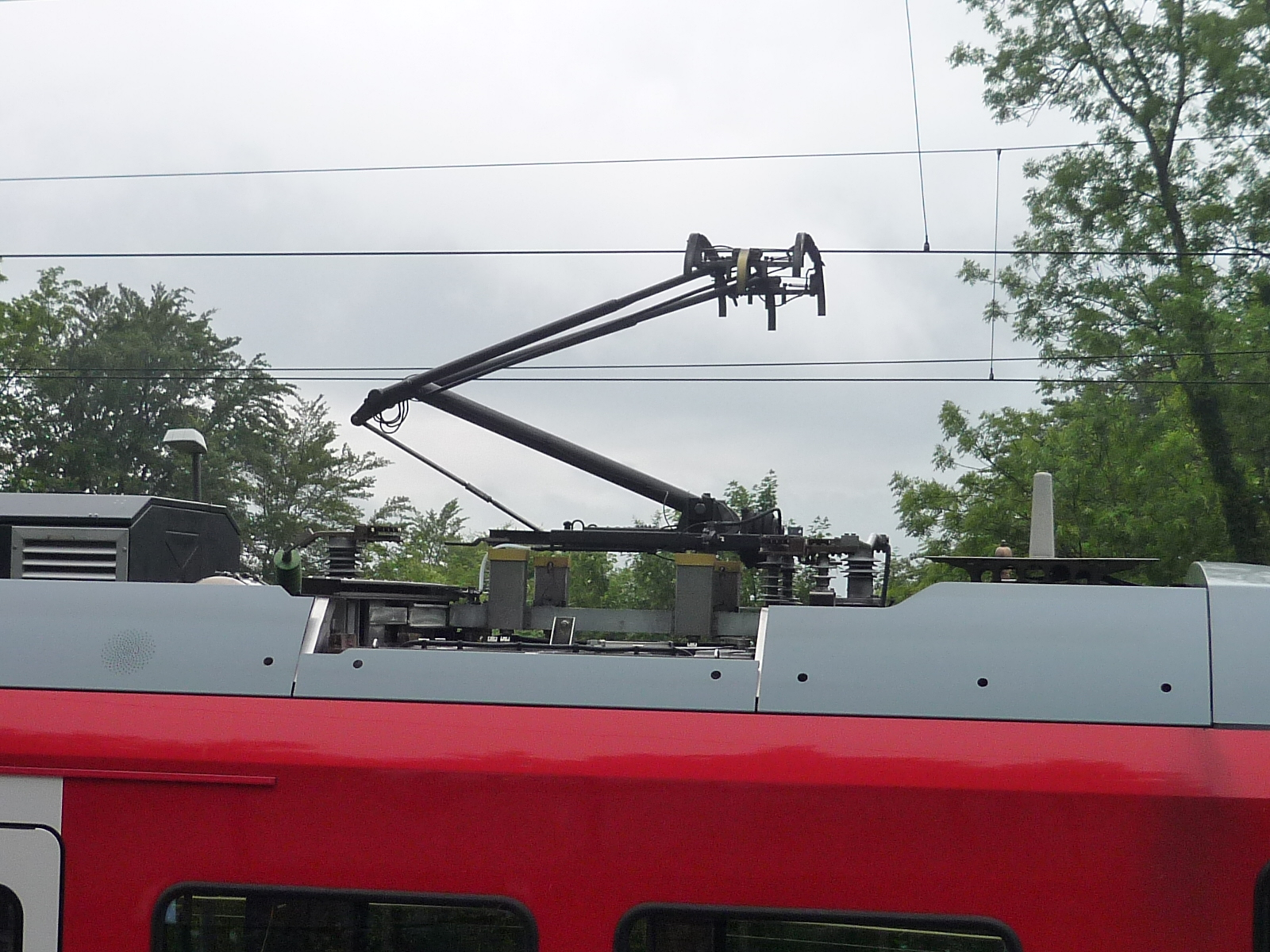
Overview pantograph
Be 510 EMU and line

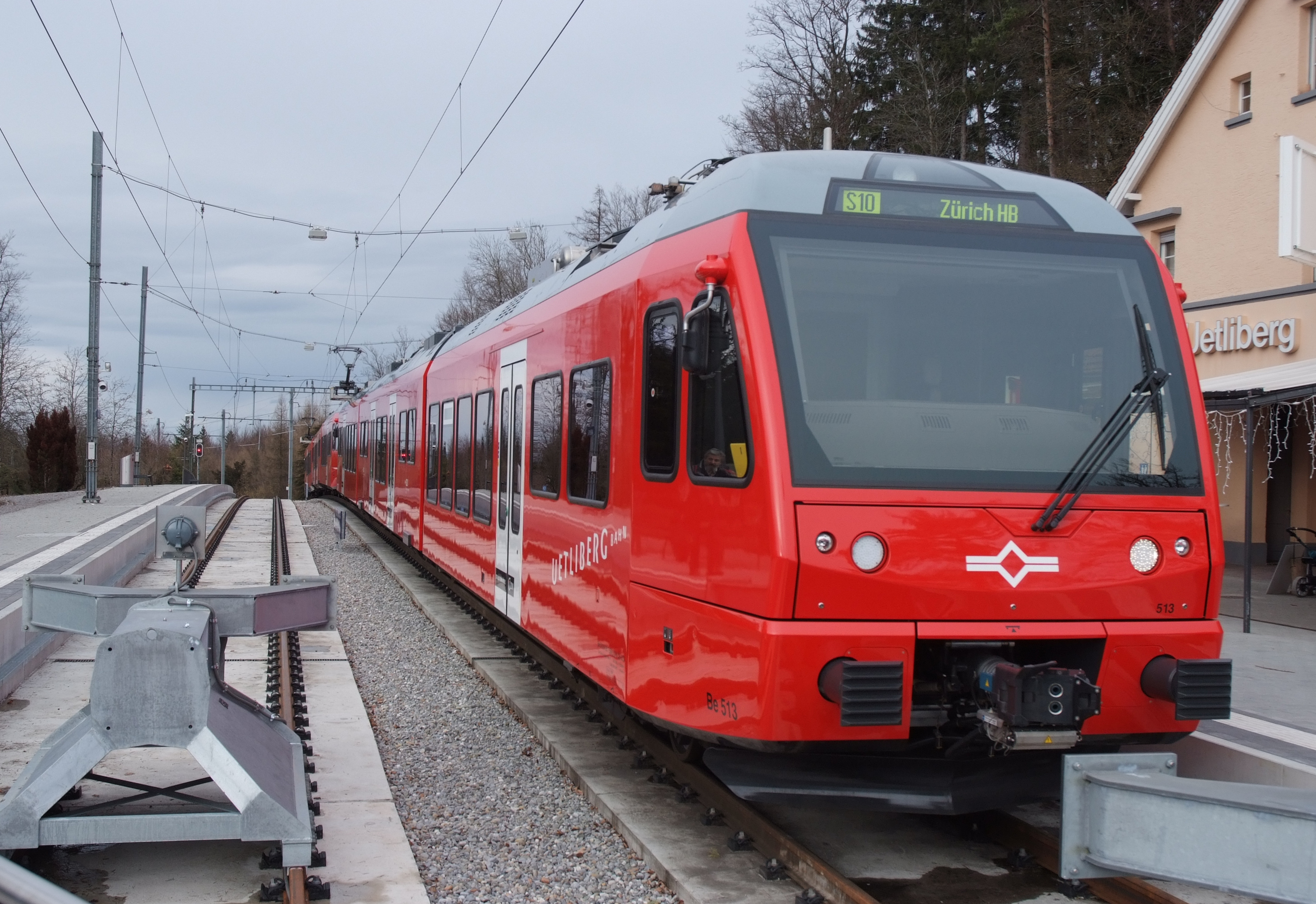
Be 510 on track 1, Uetliberg

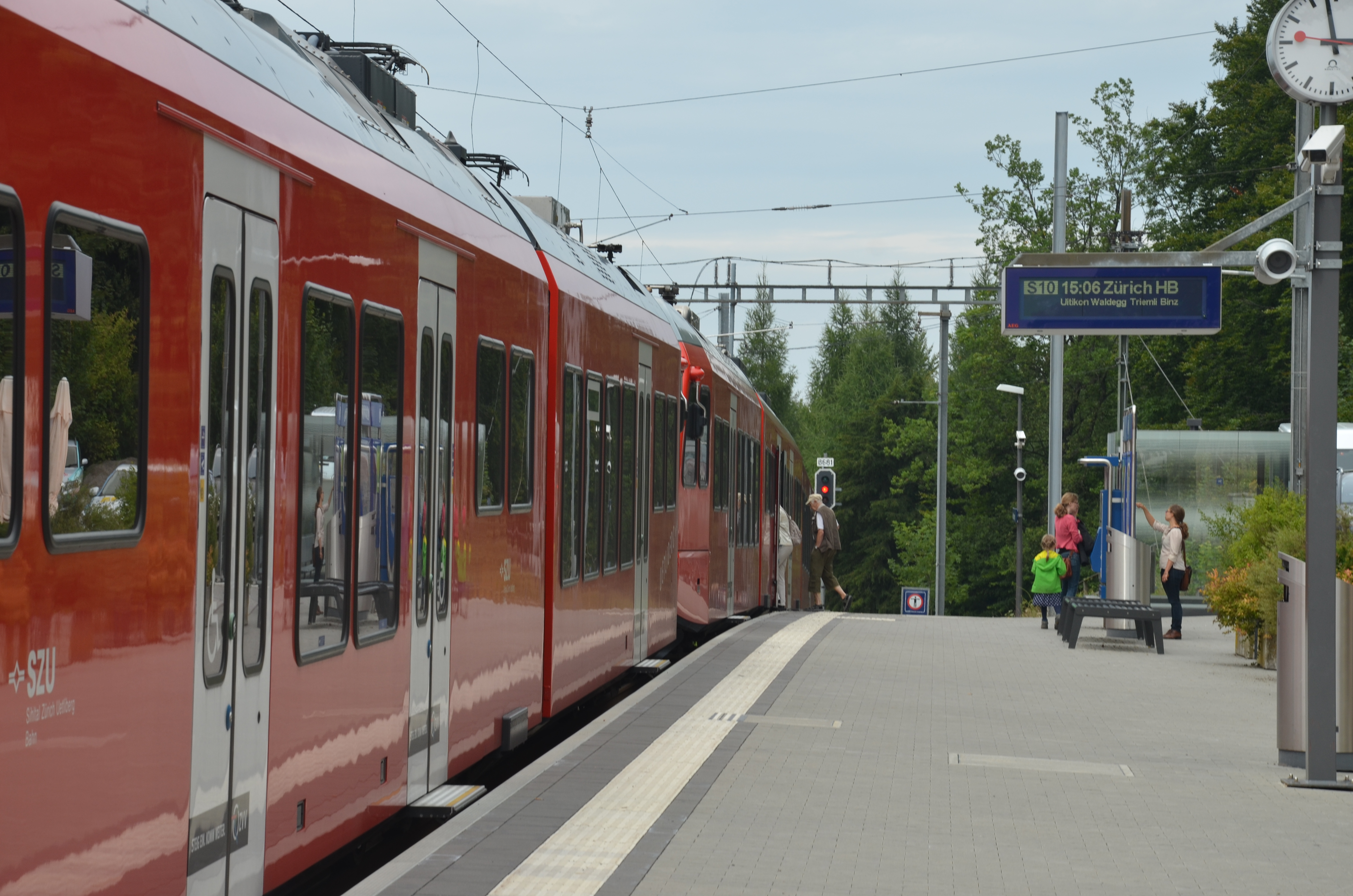
Low floor entrance, end car.

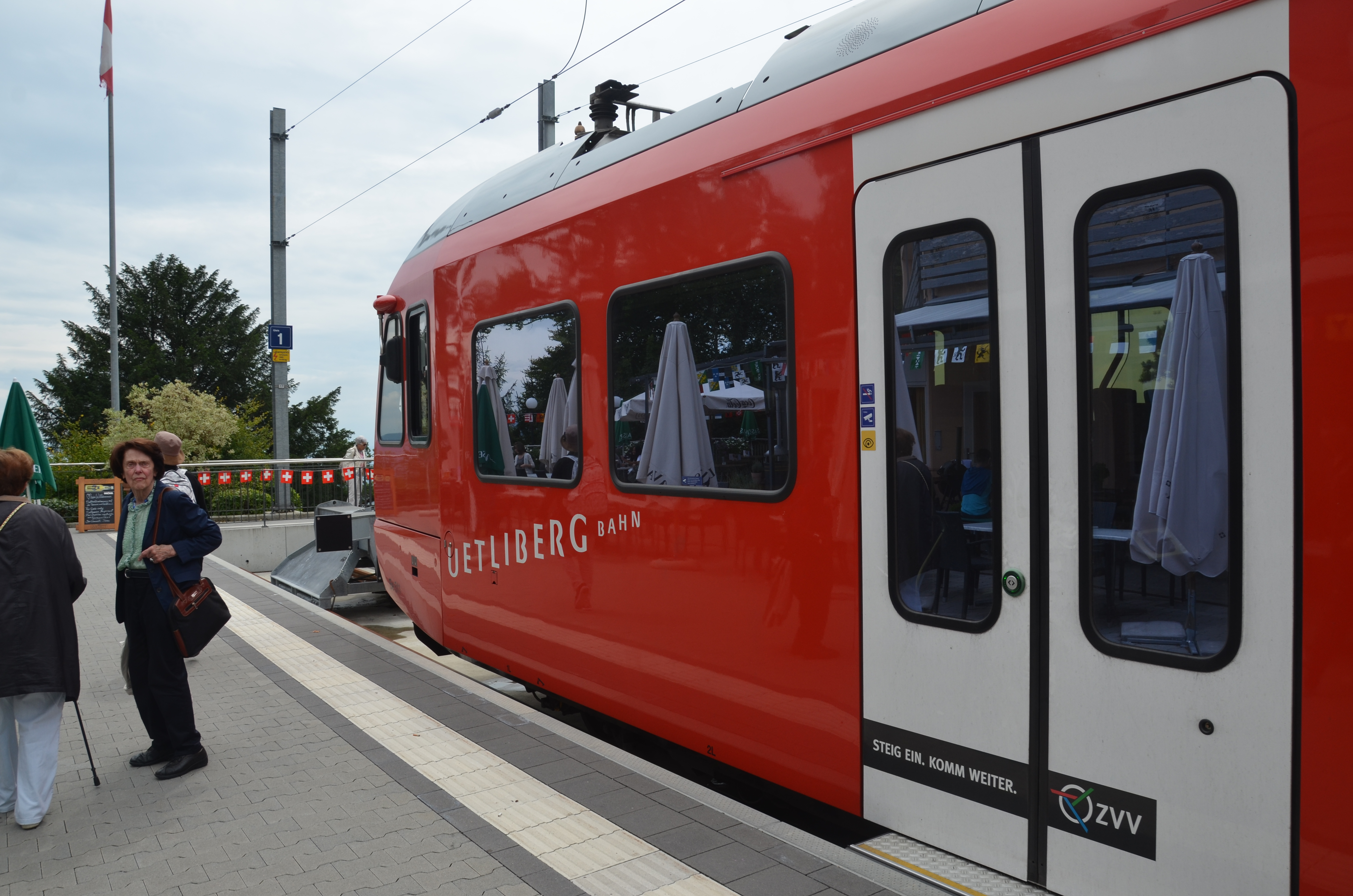
Train at buffer stop, station Uetliberg. Low floor door.

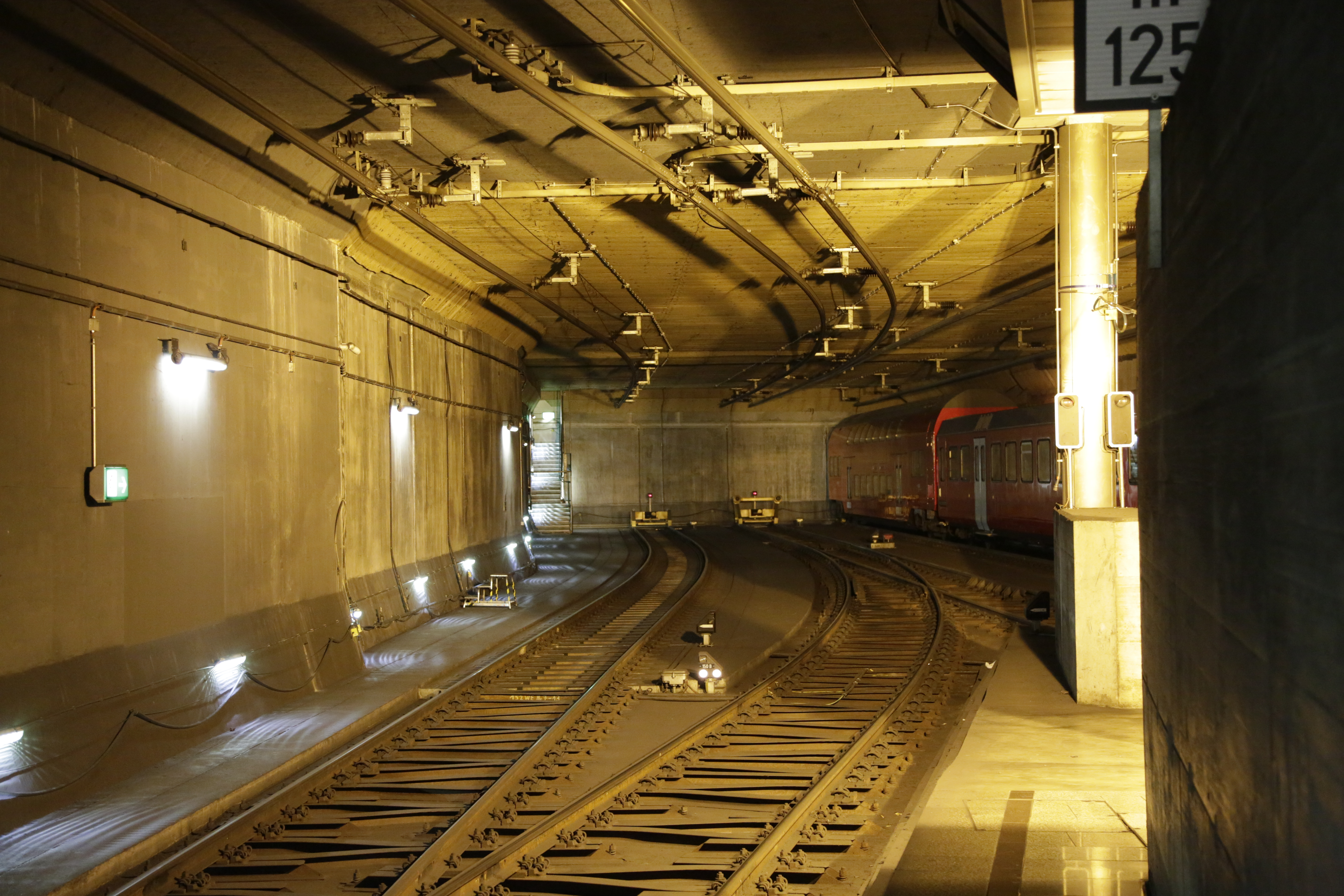
Conductor rails for both voltages, Zürich main station, track 22

== Literature ==
- Martin Gut, Urs Nötzli: Die Be 556 511–516 der SZU. In German, periodical Eisenbahn Amateur 12/2013, pages 576–578
