= ZUB 1xx =

European train protection system

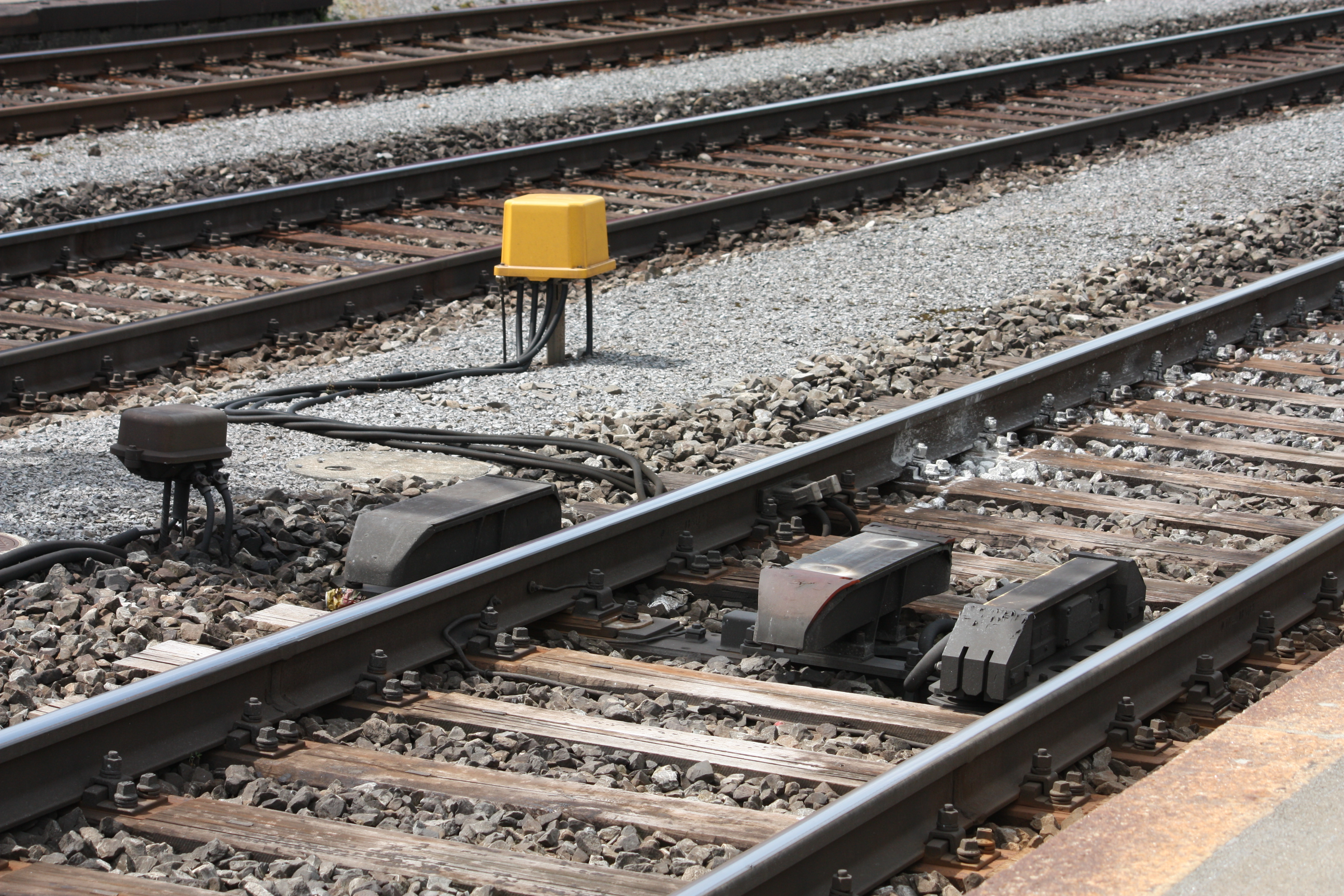
ZUB balise along with Integra-Signum magnets in the Swiss ZUB 121 system

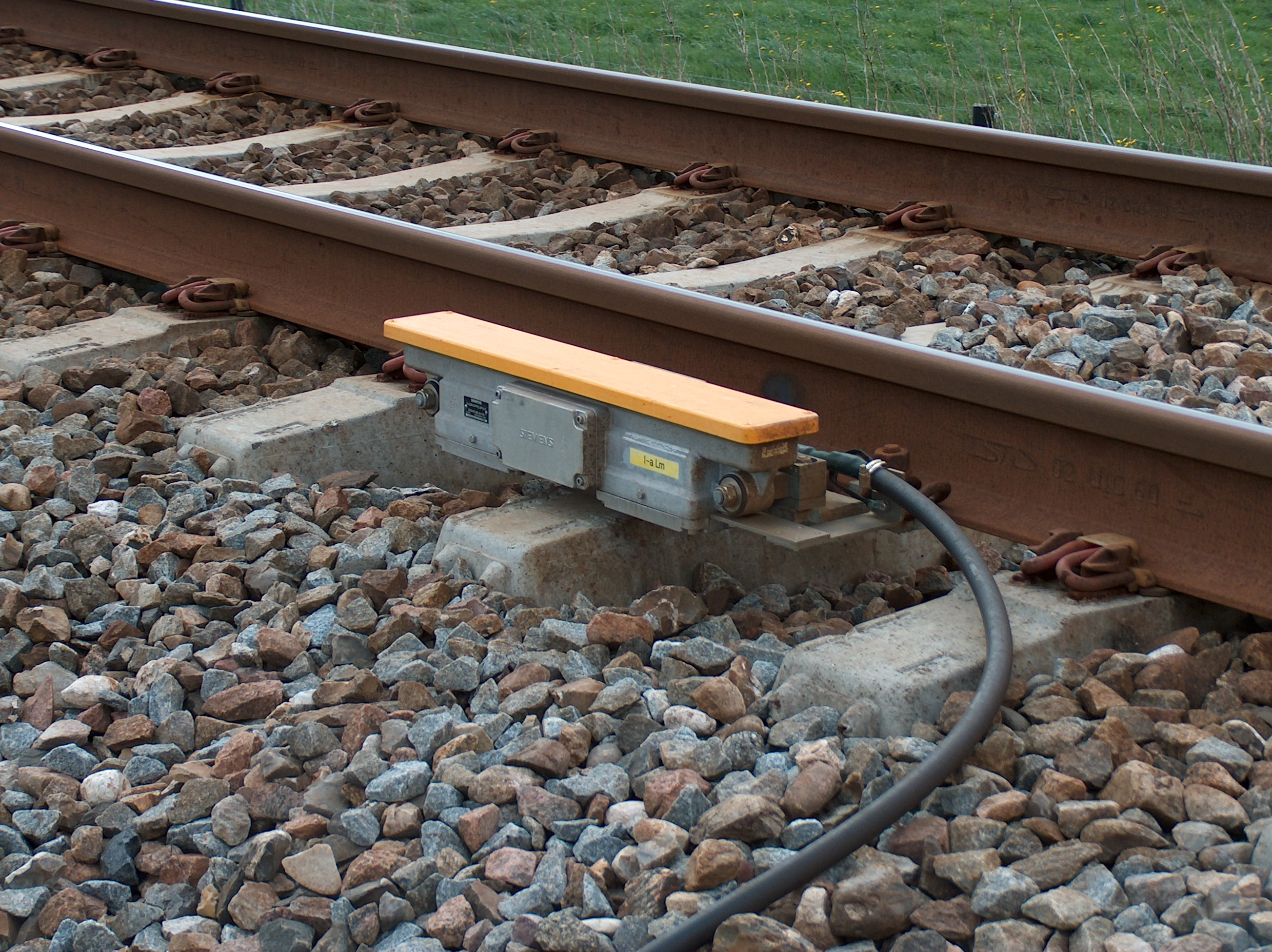
rail coupling coil in the Danish ZUB 123 system

The ZUB 1xx system is a family of train protection systems produced by Siemens. Its ZUB balises were deployed in the ZUB 121 train protection system in the Swiss railway network, in the ZUB 122 tilting control system in the German railway network, and in the ZUB 123 train protection system in the Danish railway network. Some of these were adapted for other railway lines before the next generation ZUB 2xx family was introduced which is based on Eurobalises - the earlier ZUB balises are not compatible with those.

== History ==
The German LZB was created in 1965 and it was deployed on high-speed lines throughout the 1970s. However, with its signal wire along the complete length of a track it was considered too expensive in order to replace the traditional PZB inductive train stops that have been put along with line-side signals. In the 1980s the manufacturers of railway signaling systems developed electronic versions that could be deployed in the same pattern as the traditional train stops. For Germany that would be the Indusi inductors on the outer side of the rail. For comparison the balises in France were already put in the middle of the track and their electronic variants (later named KER balises) were installed similarly.

The Swiss SBB railways had been evaluating ZUB balises throughout the 1980s but it took until the accident at Zürich Oerlikon railway station in 1992 that a final decision was made for their introduction. Siemens adapted the system to work in conjunction with the traditional Integra-Signum magnets resulting in the ZUB 121 train protection system.

In Germany the ZUB balises were taken as the basis for the GNT tilting control introduced in 1992. Siemens adapted the system to work in conjunction with the traditional PZB inductors resulting in the ZUB 122 train protection system.

The Danish State Railways had been evaluating a modern train protection system since 1978. It took to 1988 that they tasked Siemens to create a system for the Danish railway network. It was activated in 1992 and by 1996 the complete network had been converted to the ZUB 123 train protection system.

During 1995/1996 the Eurobalise specification was completed and in 2000 the European Train Control System (ETCS) specification reached a state where it was ready for deployment. While the Eurobalises are compatible with the earlier KER balises (named after their usage in the KVB, Ebicab and RSDD train protection systems) the ZUB balises are not. With the introduction of ETCS to be in sight the further development of the ZUB 1xx family was stopped. Siemens created a new family ZUB 2xx which uses Eurobalises along with the other ZUB components (the trademark ZUB is derived from German Zugbeeinflussung / train influencing).

By 2006 the old ZUB 1xx systems were discontinued by the manufacturer - by that time the EuroZUB system had been successfully deployed on the Swiss railway network showing a possible path to the replacement of the ZUB 1xx train protection systems. The ZUB 1xx systems are still in operation - however with the current plans for the ETCS deployment in Europe the earlier ZUB balises will be scrapped during the 2020s.

== Technology ==
The train transmits a 100 kHz AC signal to power up the ZUB balises. The activated ZUB balises will then start to transmit a signal at 50 kHz with a digital signal modulated at a frequency of 850 kHz. The transmitted telegram structure is compatible with the LZB telegrams specification.

With "balise" being a French term the German specifications have used the word "Gleiskoppelspule", literally "rail coupling coil" for their digital beacons. Their basic functionality is similar to other predecessors of Eurobalises.
