= DB Class 611 =

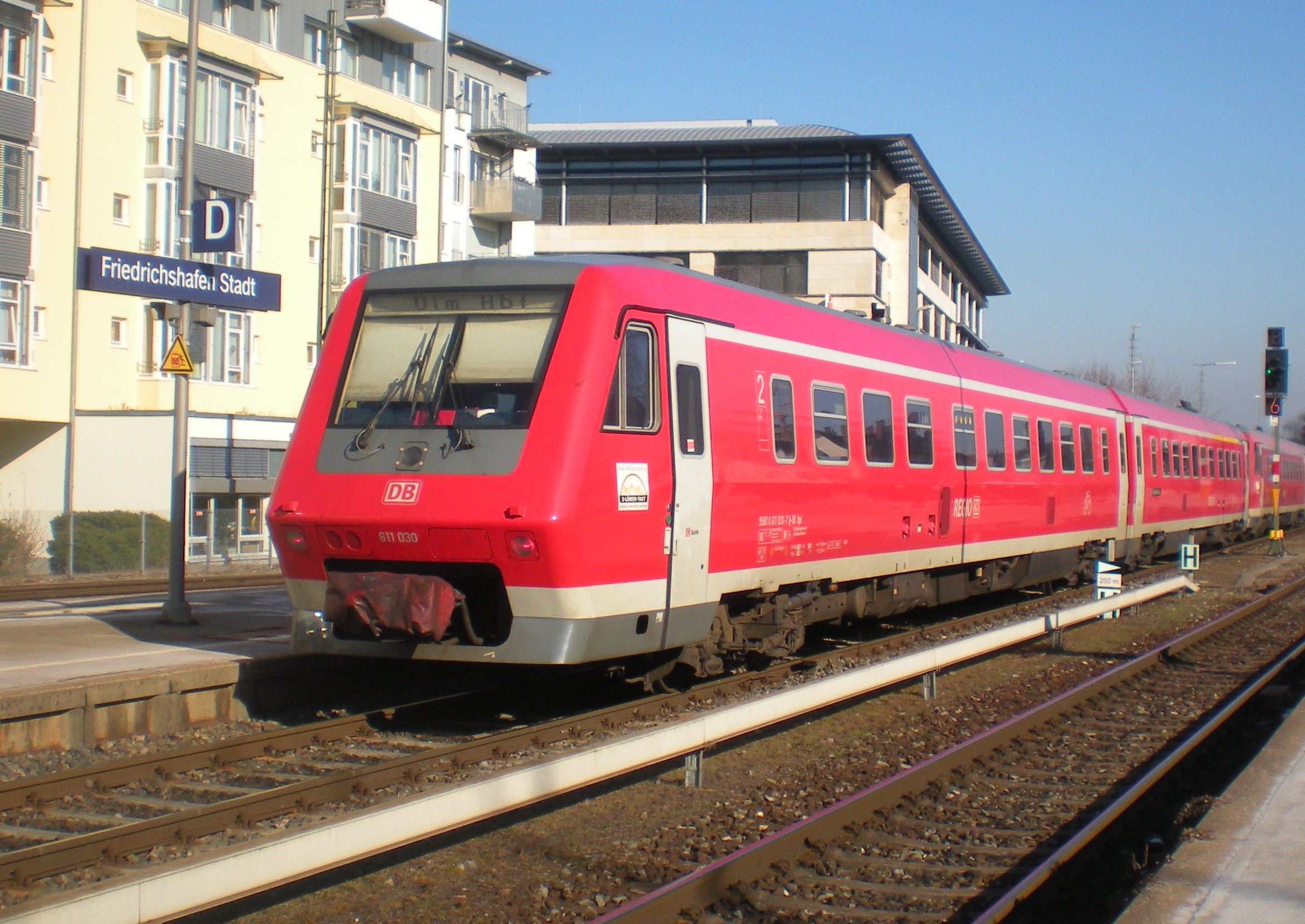
- DB DMU 611 at Friedrichshafen Stadt station
- Manufacturer: Adtranz
- Constructed: 1996–1997
- Number built: 50
- Fleet numbers: 611 001/501–050/550

Specifications
- Train length: 51,750 mm (169 ft 9 in)
- Maximum speed: 160 km/h (99 mph)
- Weight: 116.0 t (114.2 long tons; 127.9 short tons)
- Prime mover(s): 2× MTU 183 TD 13
- Engine type: 12 V
- Cylinder count: 12
- Traction motors: (?)
- Power output: 2× 540 kW (720 hp)
- AAR wheel arrangement: 2'B'+B'2'
- Track gauge: 1,435 mm (4 ft 8 1/2 in) standard gauge

The DBAG Class 611 is a two car, tilting, diesel multiple unit operated by Deutsche Bahn for fast regional rail services on unelectrified lines.

== General information ==
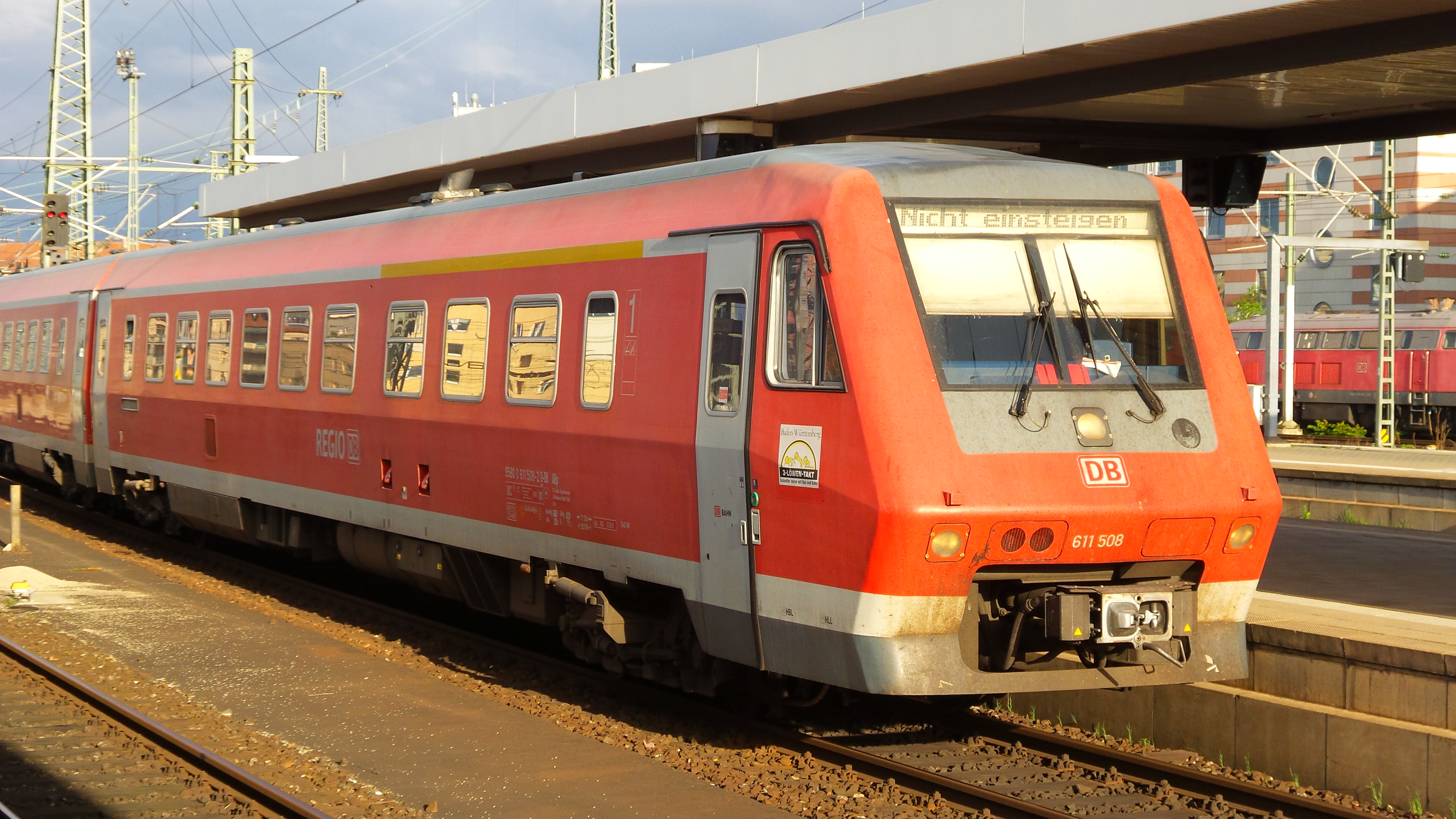
DB DMU 611 508 in Nuremberg

Class 611, successor to the DB Class 610, was developed using tilting systems from German military technology in favour of the Hydraulic Fiat systems used by its predecessor Because of environmental concerns over the potential hazards of leaking hydraulic fluid an electrically actuated option based on equipment used to keep the guns of tanks level while traversing uneven terrain was used. The Class 611 suffered teething troubles following its entry into service just two years after the contract was awarded and was largely considered a failure. However, 40 are still in use as of November 2015.

=== Tilting technology issues ===
The trains came into service in 1996 and by March 1997 the first problems with the tilting technology occurred. The Federal Railway Authority limited the Class 611 to 120 km/h and required the tilting technology to be disabled, this was only reversed in May 1999 when they were satisfied the issues had been resolved. The tilting was disabled again in August 2004 when cracks were found in the 611's successors wheel sets, the DBAG Class 612, during ultrasound examinations of the axles. Tilting was disabled and speed limits on curved tracks were reduced until 2006 when the problematic wheel sets were replaced. However further issues were experienced and in October 2009, the tilting technology was disabled once again. Since April 3, 2011, Class 611 trainsets have been used in Baden-Württemberg with tilting technology enabled once more.

== See also ==
- List of Deutsche Bahn AG locomotives and railbuses
