= Eurobalise =

Components of a train protection system

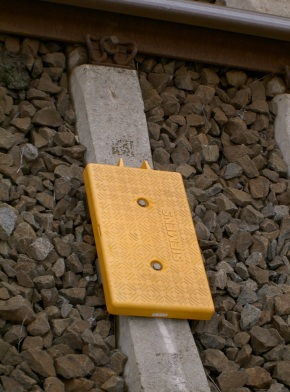
A Siemens Eurobalise in Germany

A Eurobalise is a specific type of a balise installed between the rails of a railway. Eurobalises are part of the European Train Control System (ETCS). The balises are pre-programmed and contain information that is read by train antennas. One of their many functions is to allow a train to determine its location.

== Overview ==
A balise typically needs no wayside power source. Coupling between the balise and the vehicle-mounted antenna is by magnetic induction, similar to a transformer. Although operating at frequencies typical of radio, it is not a radio system. In response to "telepowering" by means of a 27 MHz, CW-modulated magnetic field transmitted by a Balise Transmission Module (BTM and its associated antenna) mounted under a passing train, the balise transmits information to the train (uplink) by means of a 4.234 MHz FSK-modulated magnetic field. The original provisions for Eurobalises to receive information from the train (downlink) have been removed from the specification. The transmission rate is sufficient to transmit at least three copies of a 'telegram' to be received by a train passing at any speed up to 500 km/h. The BTM may be integrated into the on-board antenna or a separate electronic module, according to the preference of the system vendor.

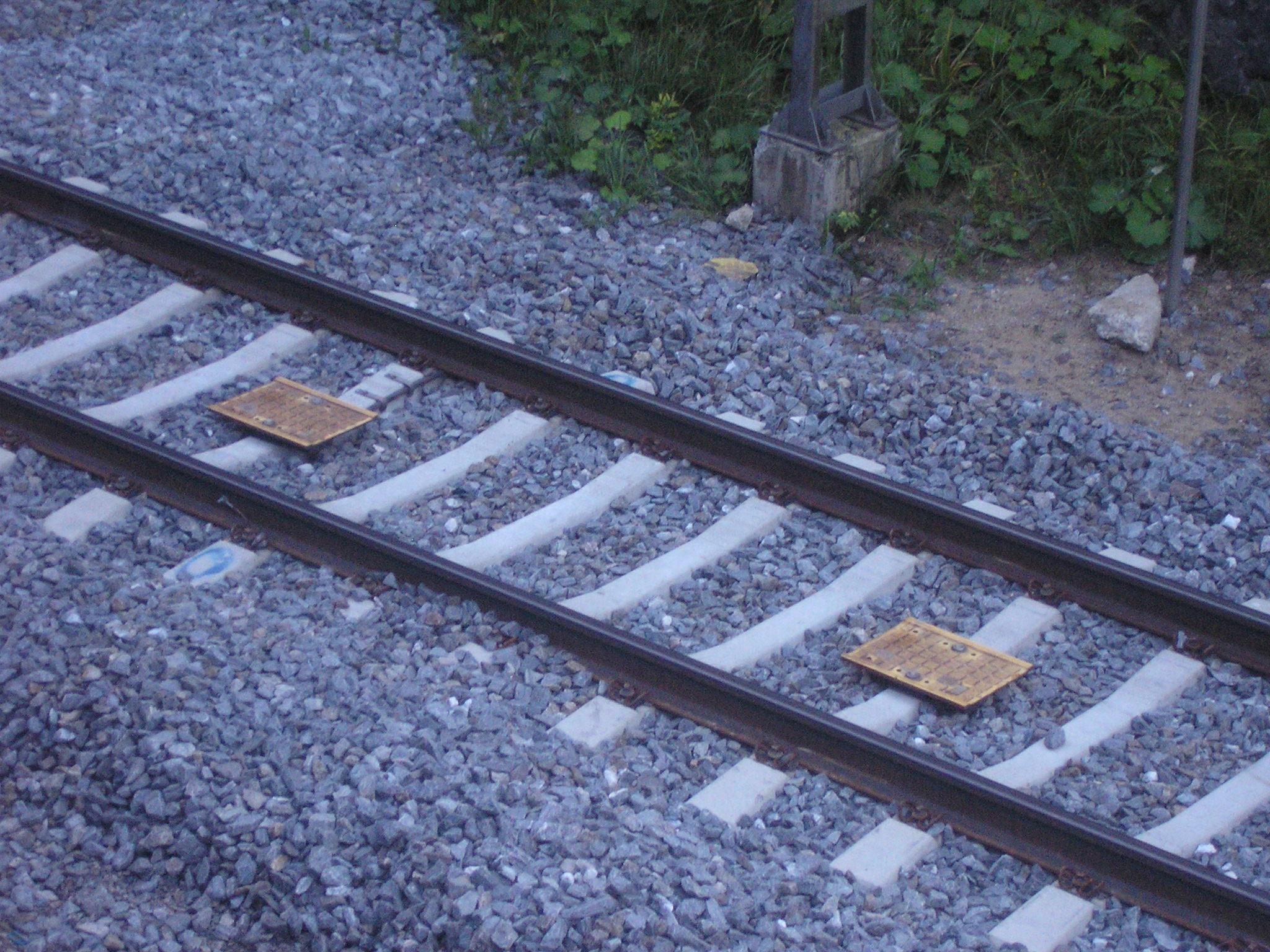
Balises on the Orivesi–Jyväskylä railway in Muurame, Finland

Eurobalises are typically placed in pairs on two sleepers in the center of the track. For ETCS they are typically spaced three metres apart. With the balises being numbered the train will know whether it travels in nominal (1→2) or reverse direction (2→1). Singular balises exist only when linked to a previous balise group or when their function is reduced to provide only the exact position. There may be up to 8 balises in a balise group.

Balises are differentiated as being either fixed-data, transmitting the same data to every train, or transparent data, switchable, or controllable, transmitting variable data. (Note that the word fixed refers to the information transmitted by the balise, not to its physical location; all balises are immobile.)

=== Fixed-data balise ===
A fixed-data balise is programmed to transmit the same data to every train. Information transmitted by a fixed balise typically includes: the location of the balise; the geometry of the line, such as curves and gradients; and any speed restrictions. The programming is performed using a wireless programming device. Thus a fixed balise can notify a train of its exact location, and the distance to the next signal, and can warn of any permanent speed restrictions.

=== Transparent data balise ===
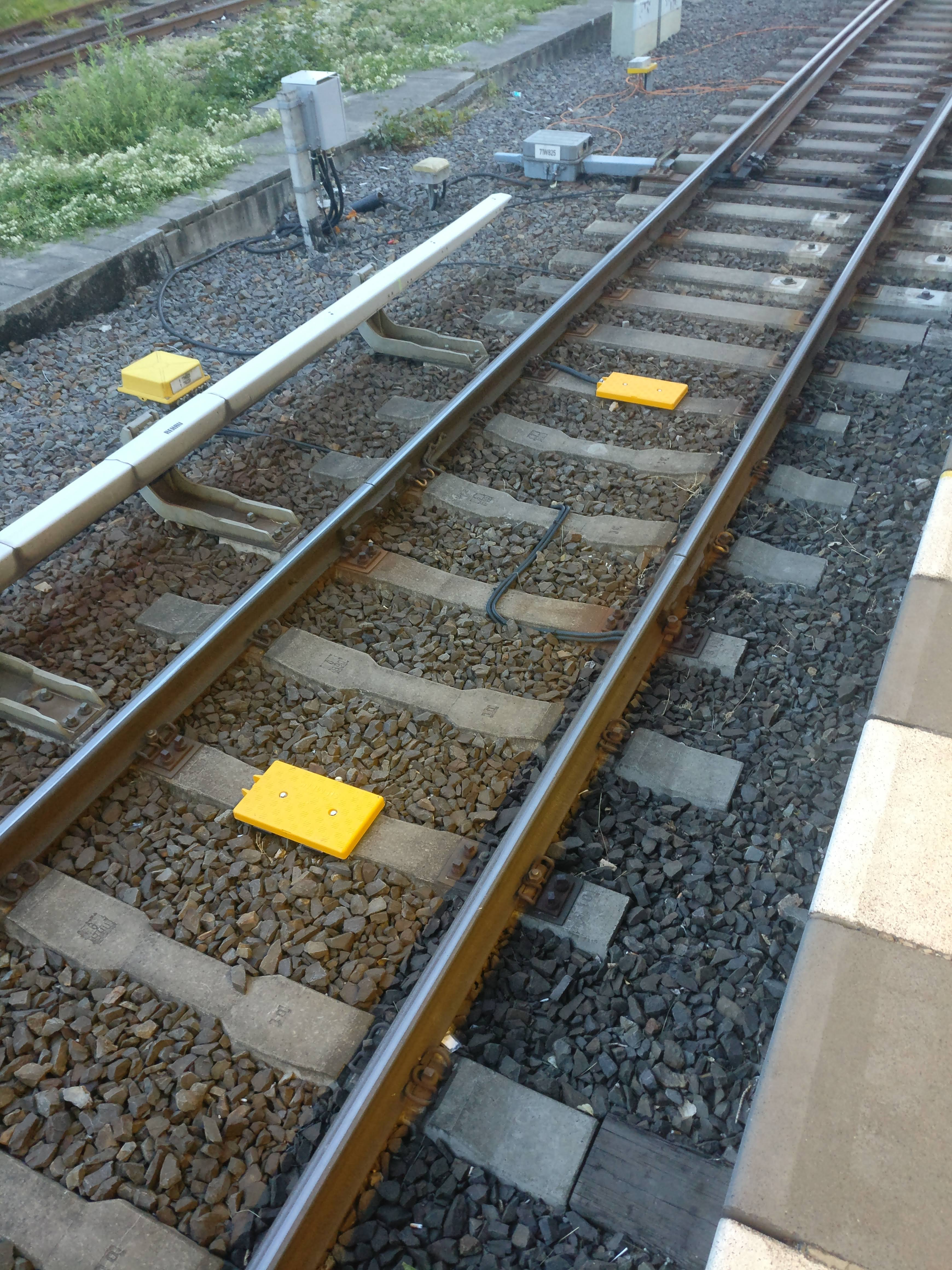
Two Eurobalises with the upper one being a transparent data balise (with cable to the lineside electronic unit, the grey box on a post), the lower one a fixed-data balise

A transparent data balise is connected to a lineside electronics unit (LEU), which transmits dynamic data to the train, such as signal indications and temporary speed restrictions. Balises forming part of an ETCS Level 1 signalling system employ this capability. The LEU integrates with the conventional (national) signal system either by connecting to the lineside railway signal or to the signalling control tower.

=== Euroloop ===
A balise transmits telegrams at a specific site. To allow a continuous transmission the telegrams may be sent along leaky feeder cable being up to 1000 metres long. The Euroloop cable is always connected with a balise at its end which serves as the end-of-loop marker (EOLM). The telegram structure is the same as for the balise it is connected to. Originally the Euroloop used the same frequency as the Eurobalises but that was changed for specification 2.0.1 in September 2004. Euroloops had been used in Switzerland which completed the change in July 2010.

=== Safety Considerations ===
ETCS and other applications using Eurobalise technology typically include protection against failure and theft of balises. Balises identify themselves to the trainborne equipment as being "linked" or "unlinked". Linked balises may send data (the "link list") to the trainborne equipment containing the identity of and distance to the following balise group or groups. By this means, the trainborne equipment is able to determine where to expect a balise and thus to identify if a balise has failed. Alternatively, in ETCS application levels 2 and 3, the "link list" may be transmitted to the trainborne equipment from the Radio Block Centre (RBC). The reaction that the trainborne equipment shall apply in case of a missing or failed balise is itself defined by data transmitted with the link list and could typically be to make an enforced brake application or to display a message to the train driver.

Balises also provide a set of fixed position references to the ETCS onboard equipment, allowing the latter to correct its odometry system for cumulative errors accrued during travel from one balise group to the next and maintain accurate tracking of its position relative to the end point of the current movement authority. These errors typically result from slippage and sliding of the train wheels on damp rails, or from controlled-creep traction.

Balise designs usually include multiple redundant electronic circuitry, allowing them to continue providing normal service for many years despite partial failure.

Although not a radio system, the Eurobalise transmission can under very specific and unusual circumstances be affected by strong radio sources operating at the same frequency, causing the ETCS onboard equipment to apply a safety reaction.

== Modulation ==
The downlink uses an amplitude modulation on the 27.095 MHz frequency. This frequency is used to power the passive balises (it is the intermediate channel 11A in CB radio).

The uplink uses frequency-shift keying with 3.951 MHz for a logical '0' and 4.516 MHz for a logical '1'. The data rate of 564.48 kbit/s is enough to transmit three copies of a telegram to a train passing at 500 km/h.

The Euroloop frequency was moved to a centre of 13.54750 MHz (exactly half of the Eurobalise power frequency).

In a practical setup the BTM requires 65 watts to power the Eurobalises and to receive the telegrams with the BTM mounted 21 centimetres (8 1/4 in) above top of rail on a bogie.

== Encoding ==
Each pair of balises usually consists of a switchable balise and a fixed balise. A balise transmits a 'telegram' of either 1023 bits (93*11) or 341 bits (31*11) in the channel encoding with 11 bit per symbol. The user data block is cut into 10-bit user symbols before the scrambling and shaping operation - the effective payload of signalling information is 830 bit (83*10) for the long telegram and 210 bit (21*10) for the short telegram. The final telegram consists of

- shaped data (913 bit or 231 bit) containing the payload (830 or 210 bit)
- control bits (Cb, 3 bit)
- scrambling bits (Sb, 12 bit)
- extra shaping bits (Esb, 10 bit)
- checksum (CheckBits, 85 bit)

The telegram is broadcast in a cyclic manner as the train passes over the balise. To avoid transmission errors the payload is scrambled (avoiding burst errors), substituted with a symbol code of different Hamming distance, and a checksum is added for validity checks. Since the checksum is computed after the symbol substitution the telegram contains extra shaping bits to allow the resulting checksum bits to be filled up in a way that only valid symbols of the chosen channel code are in the telegram where each symbol has 11 bits.

The payload data consists of a header followed by multiple packets defined in the ERTMS protocols. Typical packets are:

- Packet 5 - Linking
- Packet 12 - Movement Authority
- Packet 21 - Gradient Profile
- Packet 27 - International Static Speed Profile
- Packet 255 - End of information

Many applications include optional packets like Packet 3 - National Values, Packet 41 - Level Transition Order, and Packet 136 - Infill Location Reference. If the telegram maximum of 830 bits is reached then more packets can be sent in the following balises of the same balise group - with up to 8 balises in a balise group the maximum ERTMS message per balise group can encompass 8 * 830 = 6640 bits (note that every telegram must contain a header and the trailer packet 255). A fixed balise transmits a stable message which typically can include the linking information, gradient profile, and speed profile. It may also contain track information such as route suitability data for different train types and axle load restrictions.

Almost all packet types contain a parameter flagging whether its information is relevant for the "nominal" or "reverse" direction (or both). If a train sees balise 1 before balise 2 then it passes over the group in the nominal direction. Consequently, some packets may be dropped by the application software of the receiver if they are not designated for the relevant direction. The ERTMS header block of 50 bits contains the ETCS version, the current number and total count of balises within a balise group (up to 8 balises), a flag whether it is a copy (up to 4 copies) that increases chances for the receiver to see the telegram of the balise in a group, a serial number flagging whether the message has changed lately, a 10-bit country identifier along with the 14-bit balise group identifier allowing for a unique ID of every balise group. The linking information informs about the distance to the next balise group (one linking packet per direction) and the required train reaction if the next balise group is missed (e.g. train stop). The movement authority packet defines a maximum speed that may be used for a given maximum distance and maximum time - setting the maximum speed to zero will force the train to stop. The gradient profile may have a variable length based on the contained pairs of section length (scalar and number in the metric system) and section gradient (uphill/downhill flag and a number in %). Similarly the international static speed profile is given in a variable count of section parts with each part denoting the section length (number in meters - the scale is only given once at the start of the packet for all sections), the maximum speed (number * 5 km/h - allowed numbers are 0-120 i.e. some spare values are left over) and a flag if the speed restriction applies to the front or rear end of the train (possibly allowing for a delay). The trailer packet only contains its packet id with no parameters where 255 equals the state of all bits set in the 8-bit packet id field (11111111).

== Manufacture ==
The history of ETCS has seen the formation of UNISIG (Union of Signalling Industry) in 1998 to promote the development of the system. The founding members were Alstom, Ansaldo, Bombardier, Invensys, Siemens and Thales. The group has ensured that Eurobalises may be made by several different companies; while the balises may vary in the details, they are manufactured to meet the same standards. The principal manufacturers of Eurobalises belong to a group of seven firms (Alstom, Ansaldo STS, Bombardier, Invensys, Siemens, Sigma-Digitek, Thales) within the UNIFE federation of railway suppliers. This group cooperated in developing the specifications for Eurobalises. Specifications for Eurobalises are governed by the European Railway Agency.

== Usage ==
Eurobalises are not only used in the ETCS/ERTMS train protection system. There are alternative implementations that pick up on the telegram structure to encode only some packet types and adding additional specific information. "Packet 44" serves as a general-purpose data packet for such non-ETCS applications. ETCS trains may decode the telegrams possibly translating them like any other Class-B signalling information. It is also possible that a balise transmits telegrams for different systems allowing for a transitional phase from one variant to another as typically used when switching from a national train protection system to ETCS.

The following automatic train protection systems are based on Eurobalises:

- ETCS – the European-wide train protection system
- Chinese Train Control System versions CTCS-2 and CTCS-3, used on high speed rail lines in China
- Euro-Signum – a variant of the earlier Swiss Integra-Signum train protection system
- Euro-ZUB – a variant of the earlier Swiss ZUB 121 train protection system
- SCMT – an Italian train protection system
- TBL1+ – a train protection system used in Belgium
- GNT – the system to control tilting trains in Germany
- ZBS – a new rapid transit control system for the S-Bahn Berlin
- ZSI-127 - an improved protection system for narrow-gauge railways in Switzerland built on top of ETCS hardware

Eurobalises are used on certain lines in Germany (GNT) and Great Britain (TASS - Tilt Authorisation and Supervision System) to transmit tilting instructions for curves to tilting trains while keeping the traditional train protection system. The original GNT (Geschwindigkeitsüberwachung Neigetechnik) from Siemens had used specific coupling coils in 1992 (ZUB 122) and it was switched to Eurobalises in 2005 (ZUB 262). The additional telegram packet types for tilting trains have been added to the Baseline 3 series of ETCS.

== History ==
The direct predecessor of Eurobalises are the balises of the Ebicab train protection system. The Ebicab system was developed in Sweden (and Norway) by LMEricson and SRT. The Ebicab system was developed after a crash in Norway in 1975 (Tretten). Trial runs started in 1979, and in Norway the first line fully equipped with the system was operational in 1983. The adaptation of the Ebicab system in France is the KVB system. It had been developed after a crash in 1985 and it was deployed in the early 1990s on French lines. The name for the beacons: "balise" was however in use in the Ebicab system in the late 1970s.

About the same time the idea came up to develop a common train protection system for Europe leading to the 91/440/EEC as of 29 July 1991. Since 1993 the organizational framework was in place to publish TSI standards. This allowed for the first drafts of the new technology and since 1996 the elements were tested by six railway operators which had joined the ERTMS user group.

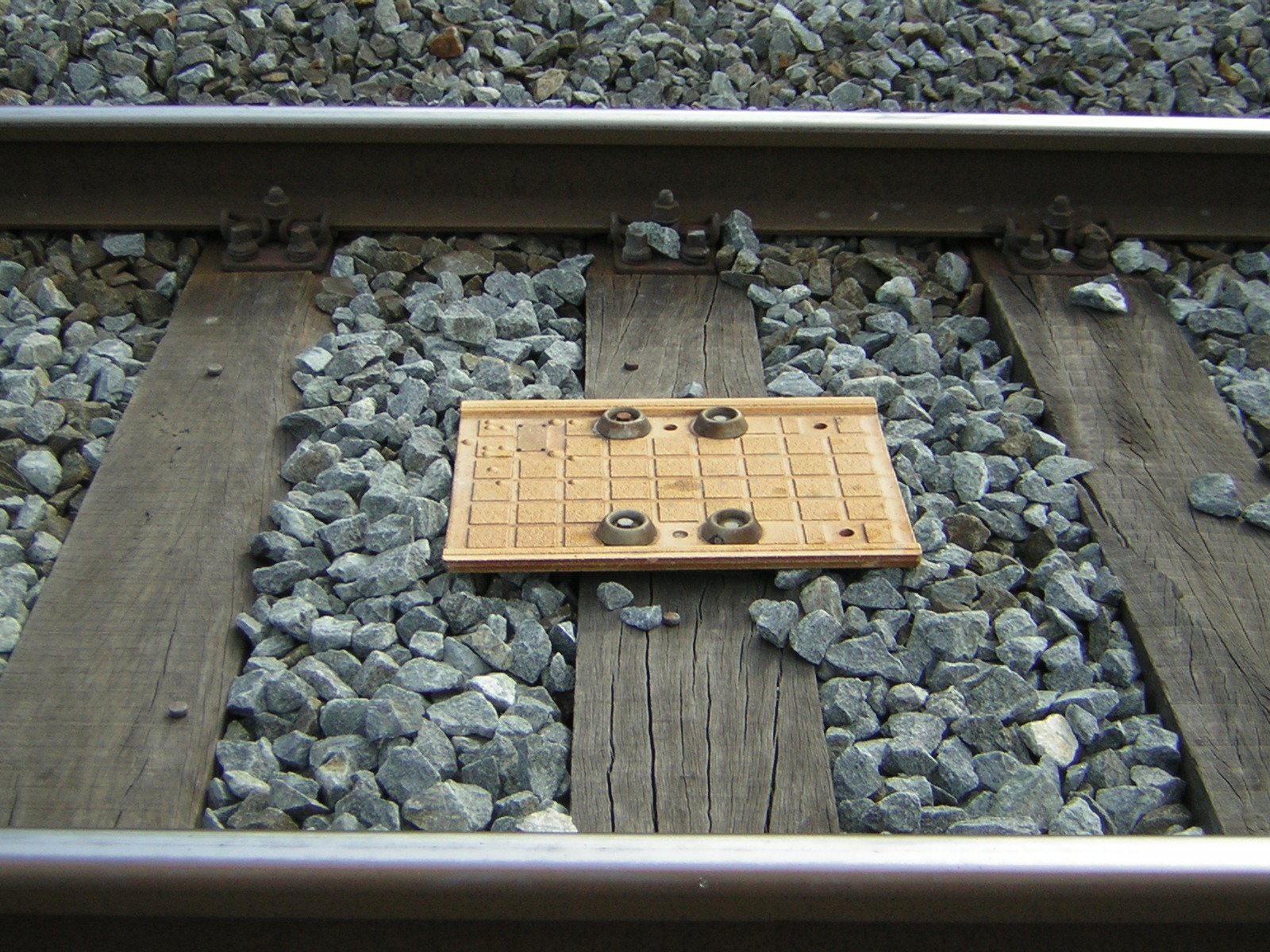
EBICAB balise in the Mediterranean Corridor

The Ebicab technology did already use the 27 MHz carrier frequency as well as putting the beacons in the center of the track. With Ebicab a single balise transmission had only 12 bit but it allowed for 2 to 5 balises in a balise group providing 24 to 80 bit of signalling information. Most of the patents on that encoding are held by GEC Alsthom. It was then up to ABB (Note: ABB rail was merged into Adtranz in 1996 which was sold to Bombardier in 2001, see "Bombardier Mannheim". Archived from the original on 4 March 2016. "1988: BBC und ASEA schließen sich zusammen zur ABB / 1996: Zusammenschluss der Bahnaktivitäten von ABB und Daimler-Benz zur Adtranz / 2001: Übernahme durch Bombardier Transportation") to extend the telegram size from 12 bit in EBICAB 700 to 180 bit in EBICAB 900 (after encoding 255 bit) as used in the Mediterranean Corridor in Spain. In that time Ansaldo adopted the balise type for the digital evolution of the Italian SCMT also becoming a second supplier for the balise type to other railways. These balise types were later collectively named KER balises from their usage in KVB, Ebicab and RSDD (Ripetizione Segnali Discontinua Digitale).

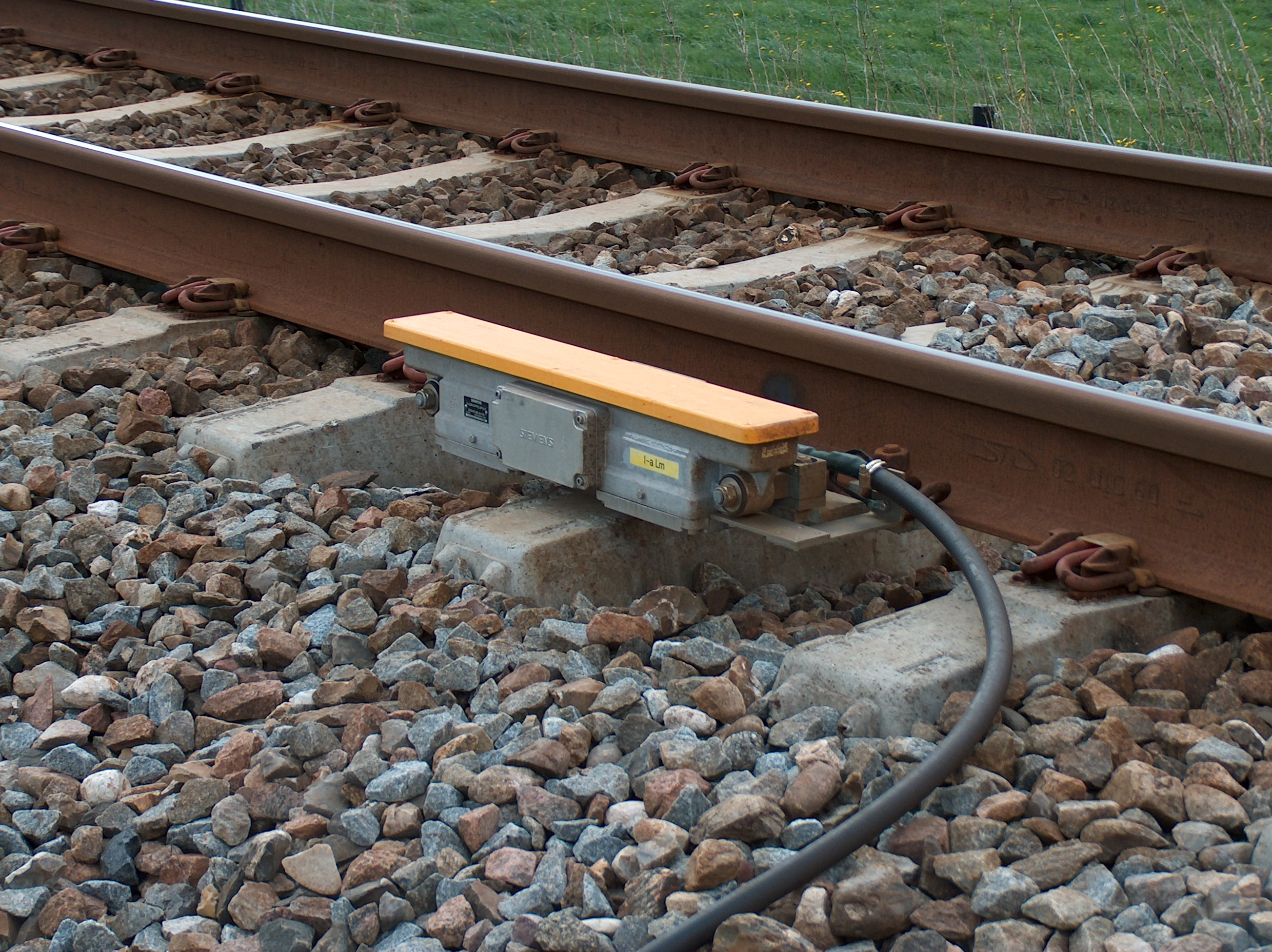
ZUB 123 coupling coil

Another source for the technology comes from the Siemens ZUB 100 family where they used coupling coils at the side of the tracks to augment the existing train protection system with additional signalling. The first ZUB 111 beacon did just allow for 21 states (using 2 out of 7 frequencies). The successor ZUB 122 switched to a digital telegram modulated on an 850 kHz carrier. The latter was used first in the ZUB 121 for Switzerland since 1992 and ZUB 123 for Denmark since 1992. The telegram types of these systems are compatible with the ORE A46 specification for the German LZB telegrams (about 83 bits).

Siemens published a report showing the advantages of the balise technology for railway operations in 1992 and in the fall of 1995 they delivered prototypes of Siemens type S21 Eurobalise. ABB, Alsthom and Ansaldo did also cooperate in the development and the S21 balise along with other Eurobalise prototypes were tested from July to October 1996 at the Velim railway test circuit and the Austrian railways test lab (Forschungs- und Prüfzentrum Arsenal).

The Eurobalise FFFIS (Form Fit Function Interface Specification) was introduced to the ERMTS range of specifications as SUBSET-036. Its foreword describes the specification to be based on the results of EUROSIG consortium (ACEC Transport, Adtranz Signal, Alcatel SEL, GE C Alsthom Transport, Ansaldo Trasporti, CSEE Transport, SASIB Railway, Siemens, and Westinghouse Signal) that got financial support from the European Commission. The EUROSIG formed after the initial Eurobalise/Euroloop Project 92/94 leading into the actual ERTMS/EUROSIG Project 95/98 supported by the parallel EMSET Project 96/00 (testing the Eurocab specification).

When the EUROSIG project had ended the ETCS was still not ready for real world application. So 1998 saw the formation of UNISIG (Union of Signalling Industry), including Alstom, Ansaldo, Siemens, Bombardier, Invensys and Thales which were to take over the finalisation of the standard. The first baseline specification has been tested by six railways since 1999 as part of the European Rail Traffic Management System The railway companies defined some extended requirements that were added to ETCS including telegram packet types for RBC-Handover and track profile information - the resulting Class 1 Version 2.0.0 specification of ETCS was then published in April 2000.
