= Integra Signum =

Swiss railroad company (c. 1890–1992)

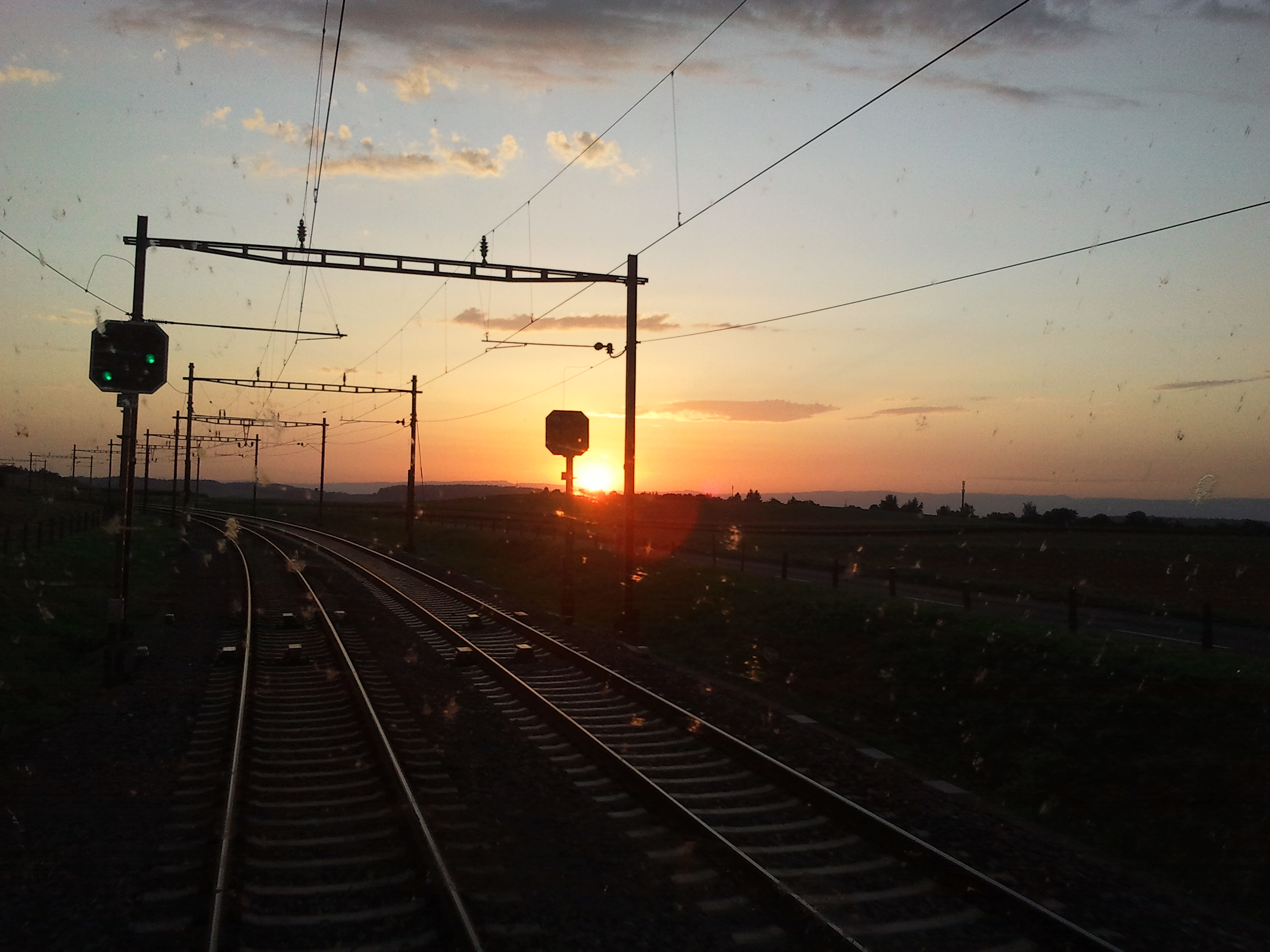
Advanced Swiss type L signal, between Bern and Fribourg on a portion of line equipped for single-track use. On the ground we see the magnets of Integra-Signum.

Integra Signum was a publicly traded Swiss company active in train control and signaling systems. Its main achievement was the development of the train control system Integra-Signum, which was subsequently adopted by the Swiss Federal Railways in 1933. In addition, many Swiss railway stations were (and continue to be) equipped with the company's signal boxes from the Domino 55, Domino 67, or Domino 69 series. Headquartered in Wallisellen, the company existed from the late 19th century until January 1, 1992, when it was acquired by Siemens. Siemens renamed the company to Siemens Integra Verkehrstechnik. It is now a division of Siemens Mobility.
