= Signum (magazine) =

Periodical

- Editor: Norbert Weiss
- Categories: Literary magazine
- Frequency: Biannual
- Publisher: Die Scheune
- Founded: 1999
- Country: Germany
- Based in: Dresden
- Language: German
- Website: www.zeitschrift-signum.de
- ISSN: 1438-9355

Signum: Blätter für Literatur und Kritik is a biannual literary magazine published in Dresden under editor-in-chief Norbert Weiss, who founded it in 1999. Each issue is around 140 pages long and includes lyrical poetry, prose, drama, essays and reviews. A regular feature, Exkurs, provides information about work from a particular region.
