= Grand National Trunk road =

Grand National Trunk Road
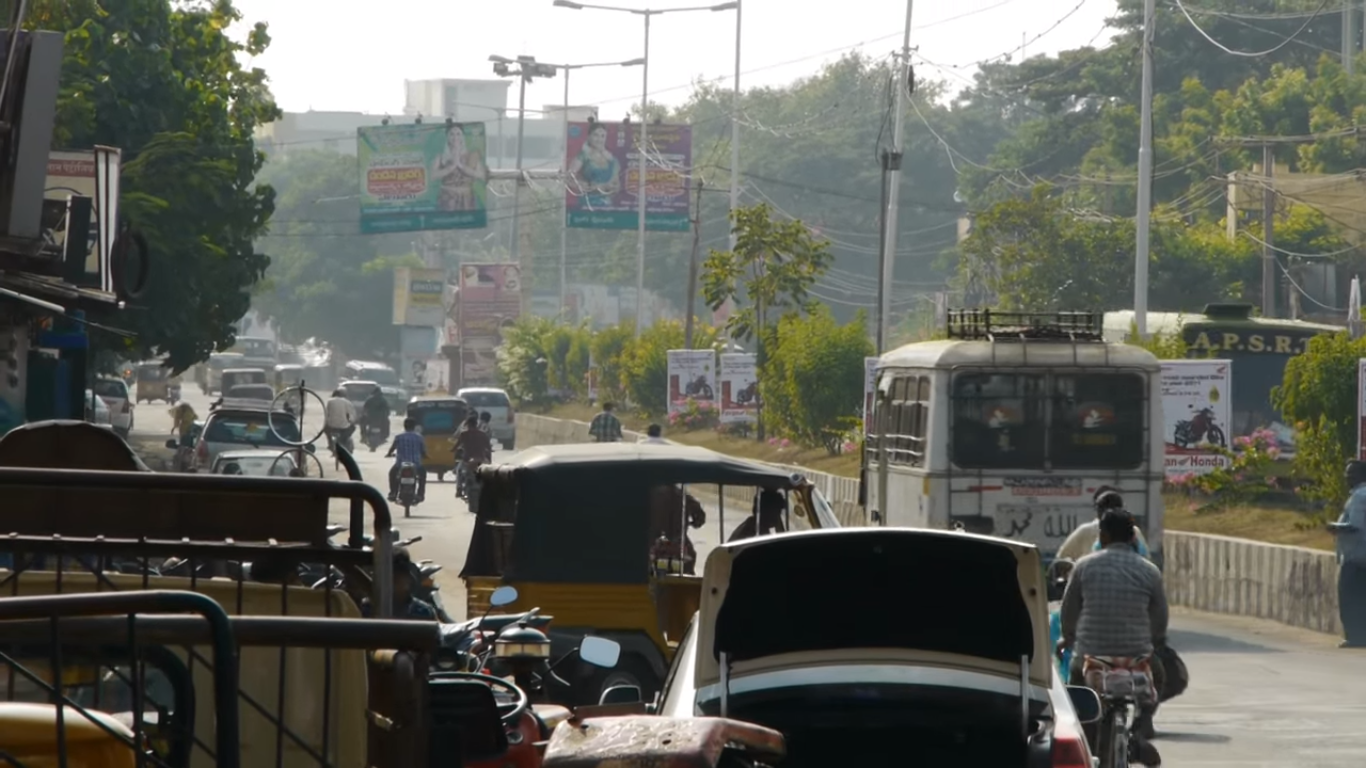
- Fire station Center

Route information
- Length: 9.3 mi (15.0 km)

Major junctions
- From: Satrampadu
- Shanthi Nagar, Fire Station, Jute Mill, Old Bus Station
- To: Asram Hospital Junction

Location
- Country: India
- States: Andhra Pradesh

Highway system
- Roads in India; Expressways; National; State; Asian

Grand National Trunk road (or GNT road) is a major arterial road in the Indian city of Eluru. The road starts at Satrampadu and continues to the Eluru railway station, running almost parallel to the Eluru Canal. It was once part of the National Highway 16 and merges with NH 16 at Asram Hospital Junction. GNT road snarls with Heavy traffic.

== History ==
GNT road has an average width of 60 feet (18 m) although it is not of uniform width throughout. It was formerly under the NHAI as National Highway 16. The road has altered the landscape of Eluru and was the catalyst for the erection of commercial businesses and prominent buildings such as, District Collectorate, Railway stations, Bus stations and Court. Government started beautification process along this road and Eluru Canal.

== Gallery ==
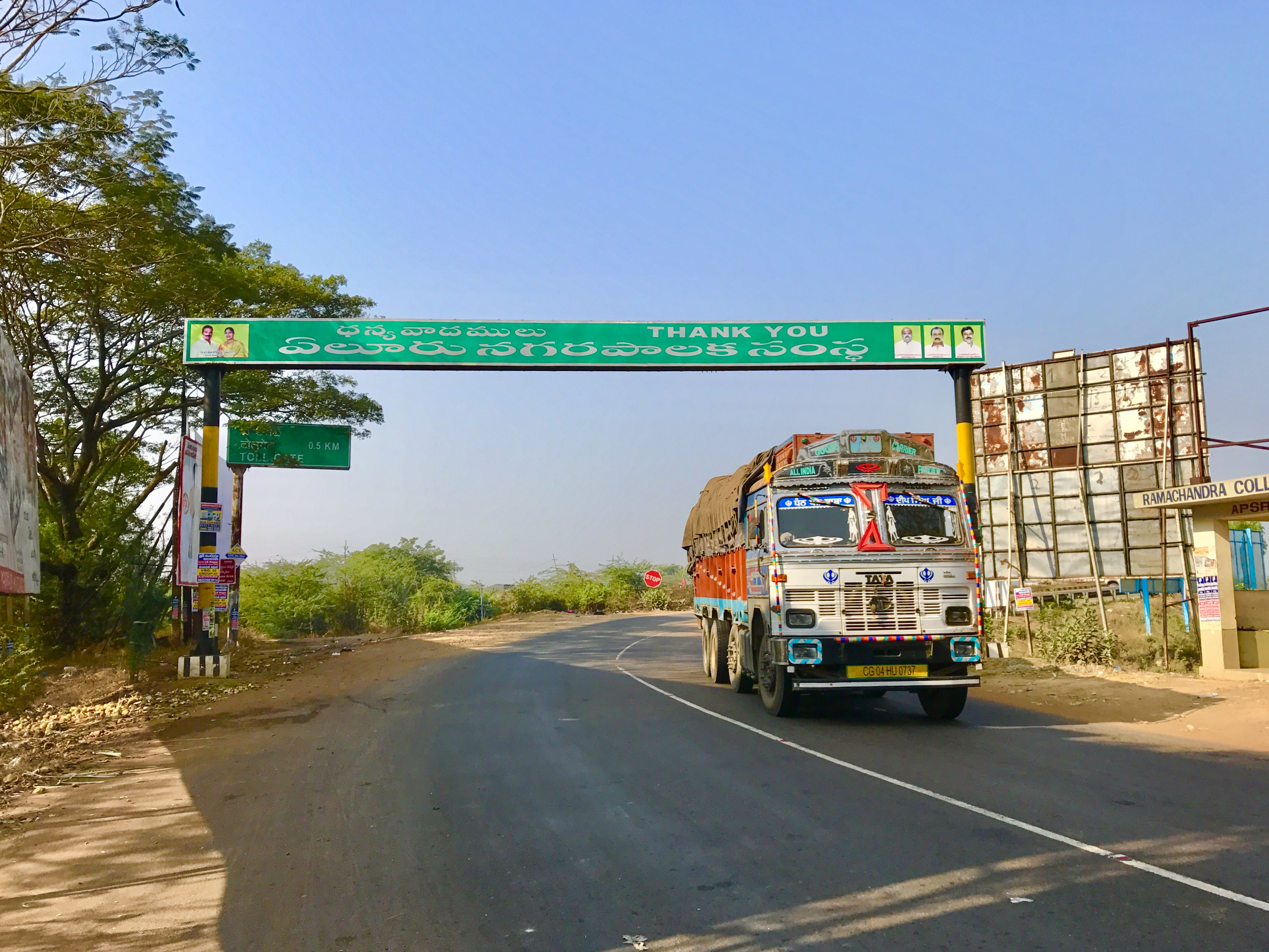
GNT road near Kallaparru Toll Plaza

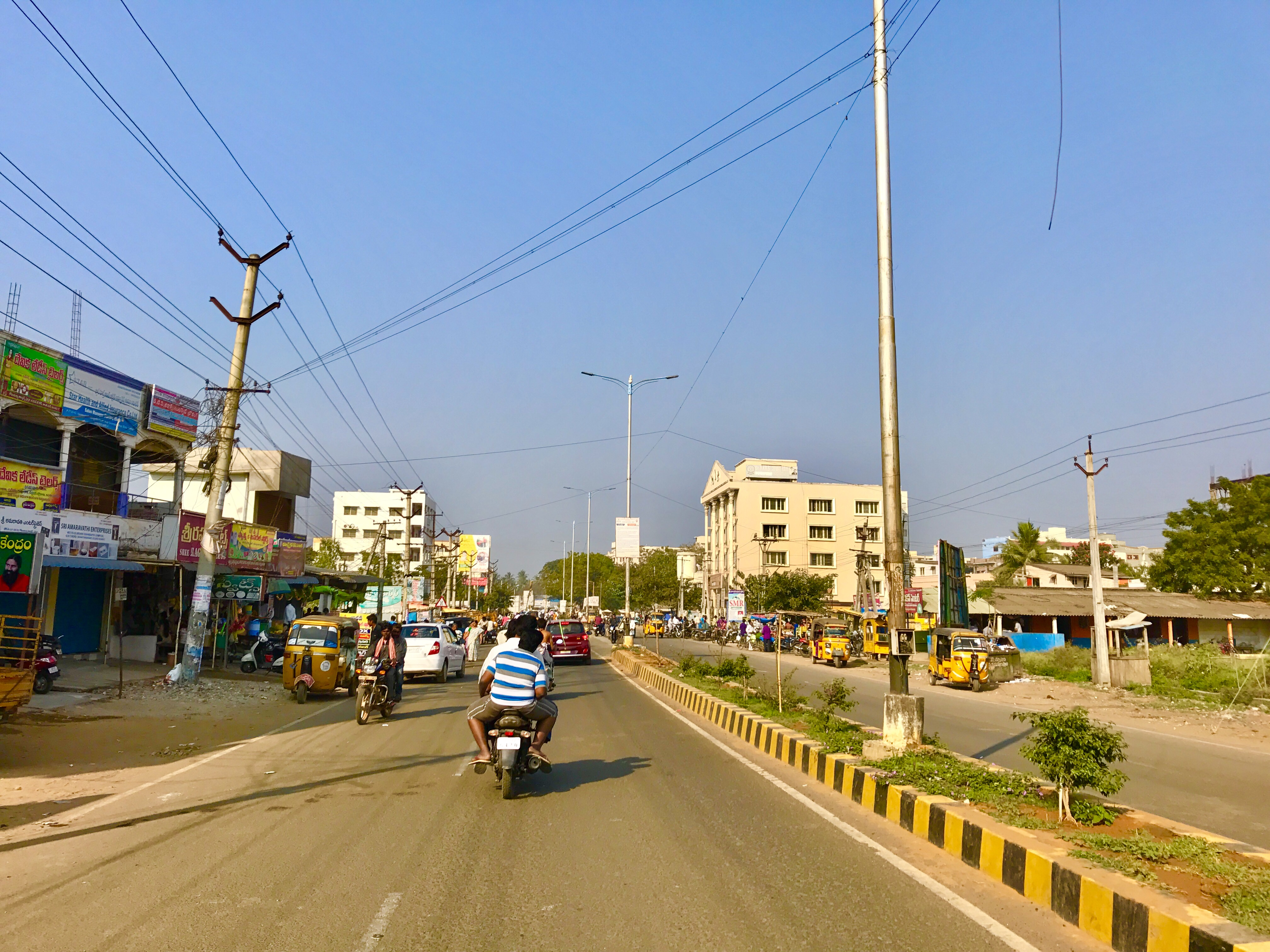
GNT road near Satrampadu

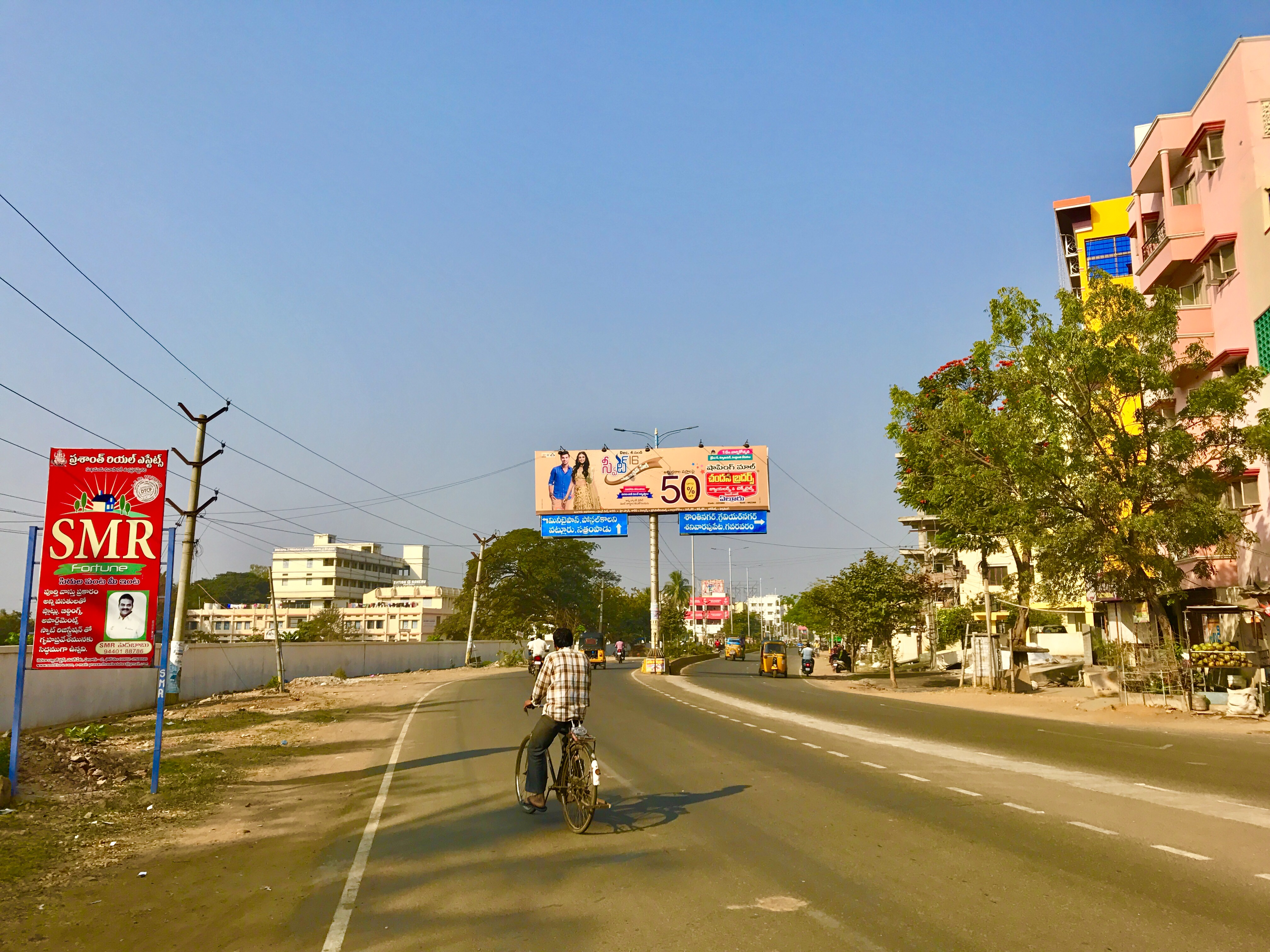
Shanthi Nagar Junction

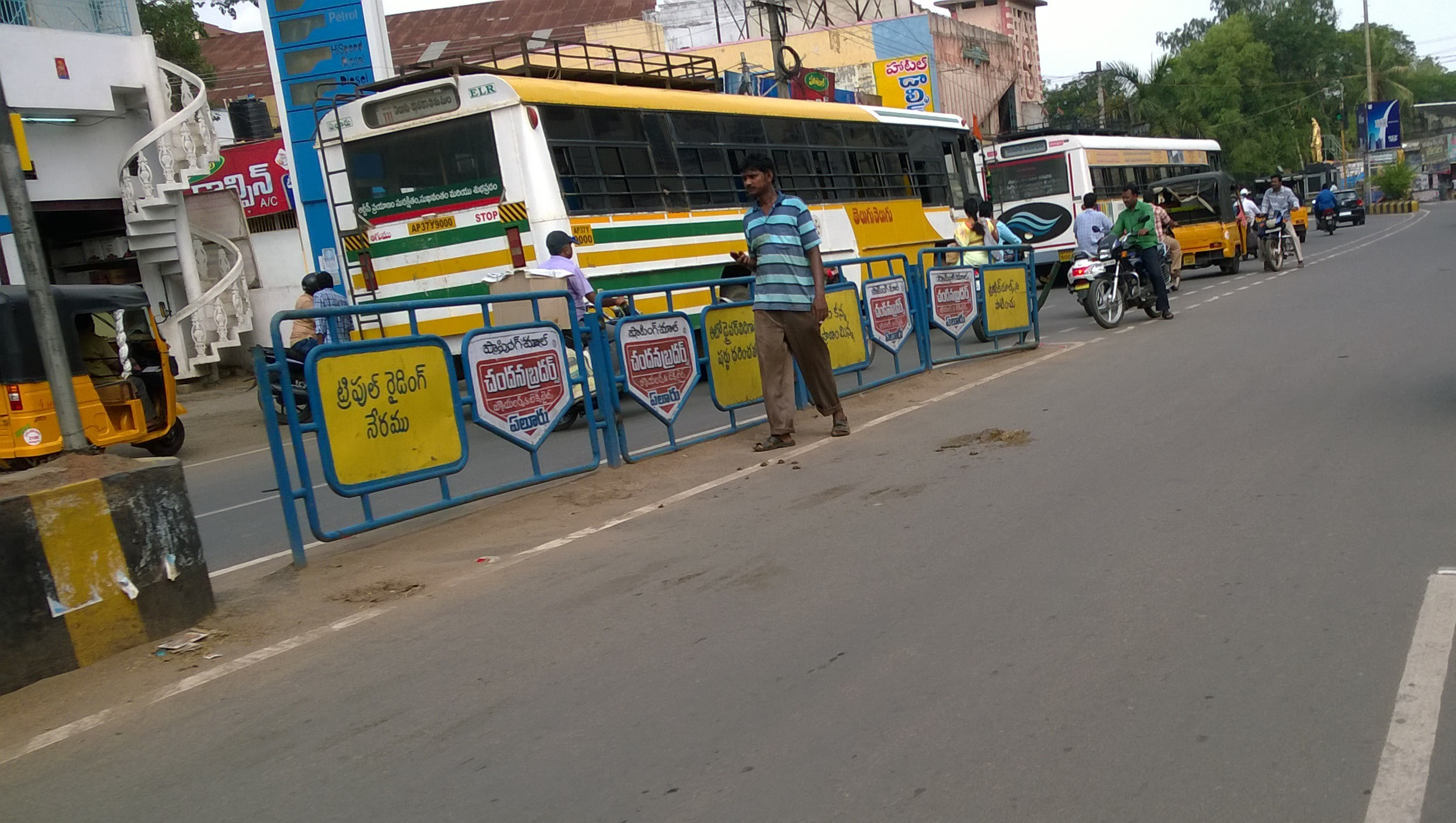
Bus on GNT road
