= Integra-Signum =

Train protection system

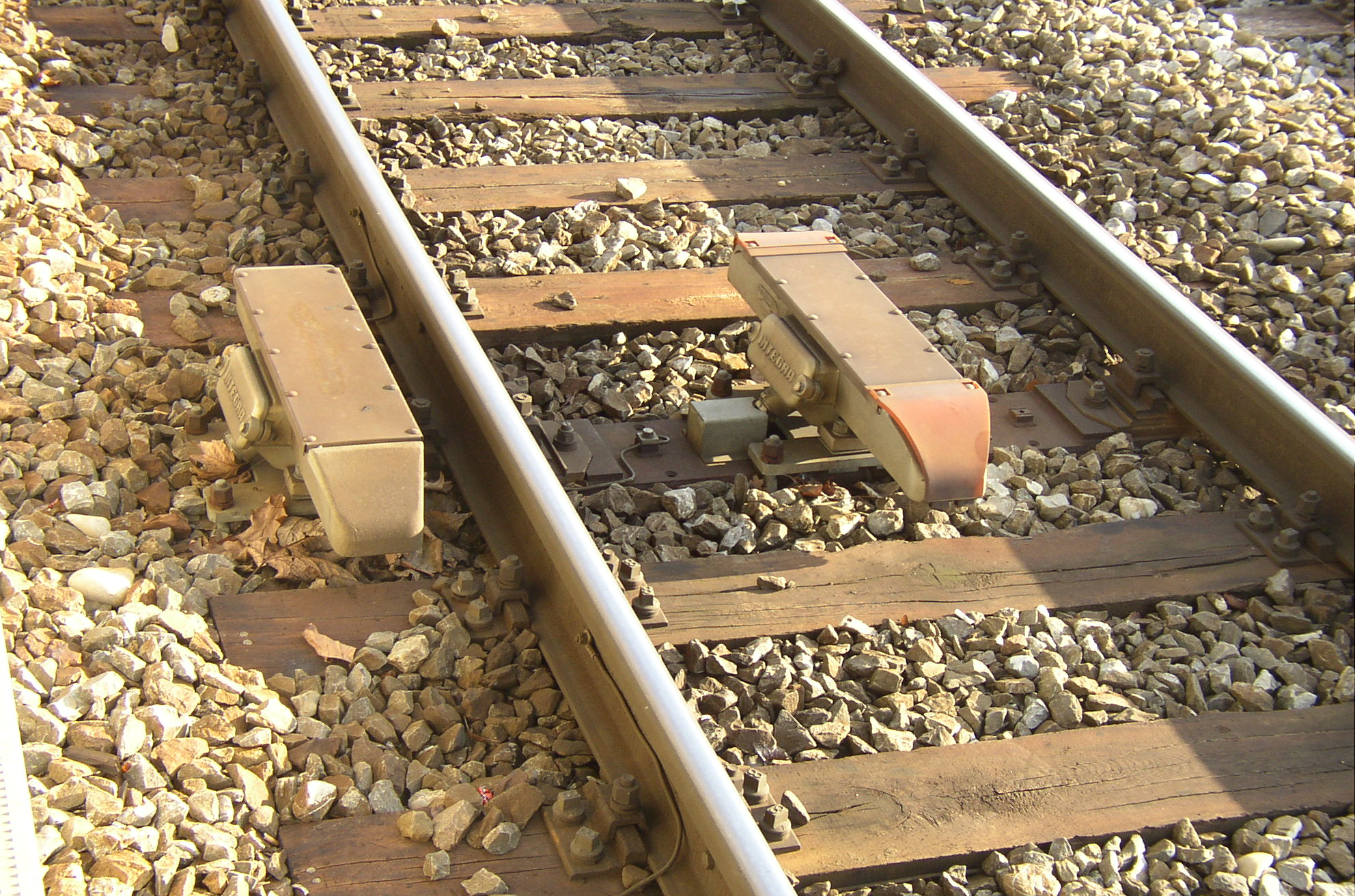
Integra-Signum trackside magnets

Integra-Signum is a Swiss train protection system introduced in 1933. Originally it was called Signum; the name Integra was added later. It transmits data inductively and is simple, robust and reliable also in snow. It is no longer used on Standard gauge railways.

== How it works ==
The locomotives have three sending and receiving magnets and there are two trackside magnets near the signals.

Integra-Signum requires the train driver to confirm distant signals that show stop and distant or home signals that show caution. If no confirmation is received or a home signal that shows stop is passed without authority, the train is stopped automatically. This is achieved by interrupting the power supply to the motors and applying the emergency brake.

The locomotive's sending magnet is a strong permanent magnet, which induces a current in the receiving magnet in the middle of the track, if the signal's short-circuit contact is closed. The receiving magnet on the locomotive consists of two magnet field detectors, which detect the signal's state according to polarity and timing of the magnetic field emitted by the second magnet outside the track:

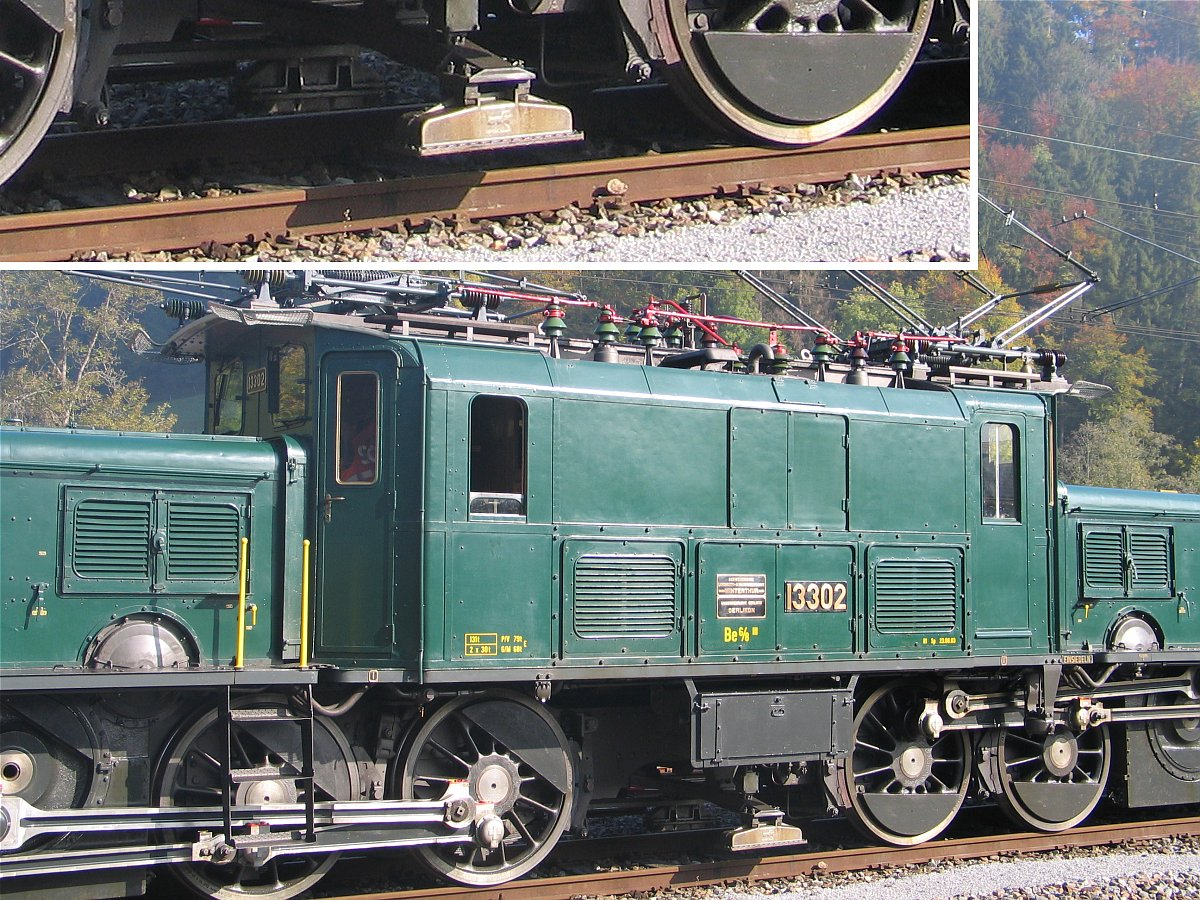
Integra-Signum magnets on a Be 6/8 ^{III} "Crocodile"

Stop (home signals): positive - negative, concurrent

Caution (distant signals): negative - positive, concurrent

Caution (home signal): positive - positive, not concurrent

Because Integra-Signum can only stop a train when it's "too late", i.e. after the red signal, it is not sufficient if there is an obstacle less than the braking distance away from the signal, which is especially a problem with fast trains. To address this issue, Zugbeeinflussung ZUB has been introduced.

Despite that Integra-Signum aims to prevent accidents, there was also an accident caused by it. In 1959, an Integra-Signum magnet mounted on a SBB-CFF-FFS RBe 540 EMU tore out a wooden sleeper on a level crossing near Gland, which led to the derailment of the entire train at 125 km/h.

=== Euro-Signum ===
Since 2008, Euro-Signum has been used for new and upgraded signal installations. Euro-Signum uses Eurobalises instead of magnets - these transmit Integra-Signum data in the additional "Packet 44" (the typical "ETCS telegram" is left empty). This migration required installation of a "Eurobalise Transmission Module" on rolling stock that uses the Swiss network. Euro-Signum should not be confused with ETCS, which was installed on the Swiss network later.

== Phasing out ==
By 2017 Switzerland had almost completed installing ETCS Level 1 throughout the railway network, however most trains continue to use Integra-Signum and ZUB (in the form of Euro-Signum and Euro-ZUB). Integra-Signum will also remain in service for a few years more on a small number of special lines; one of these is the Uetliberg railway line, which will first be converted from DC to AC electrification.

From beginning 2018, new vehicles running on the Swiss network do not need the class B system SIGNUM and ZUB.

== See also ==
- Train protection system
- Integra Signum, the company that developed the system
