= DB Class 610 =

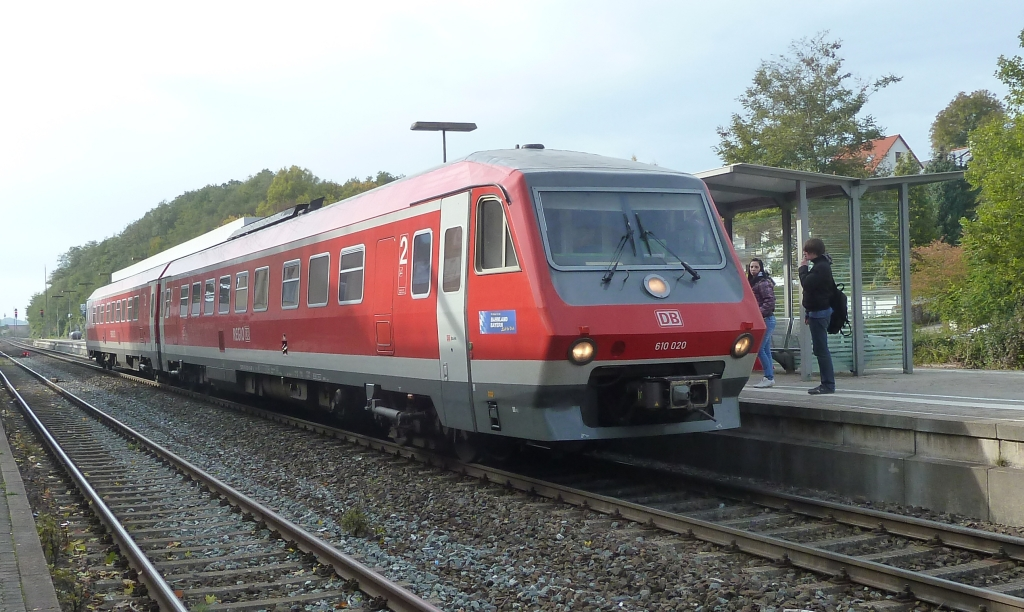
- 610 020
- In service: 1992 – 2000, 2001 – 2014
- Manufacturer: MAN, Duewag, MBB, AEG, ABB, Siemens, Fiat
- Number built: 20
- Formation: 2 cars
- Capacity: 16 (1st), 114 (2nd)
- Operators: Deutsche Bahn

Specifications
- Train length: 50.80 m (166 ft 8 in)
- Car length: 25.40 m (83 ft 4 in) + 25.40 m (83 ft 4 in)
- Maximum speed: 160 km/h (99 mph)
- Power output: 485 kW (650 hp) per car
- Track gauge: 1,435 mm (4 ft 8 1/2 in) standard gauge

The DB Class 610 is a Diesel Multiple Unit (DMU) train type operated by the Deutsche Bahn in Germany. They were built from 1991 to 1992 by MAN and Duewag. The class uses a tilting Hydraulic Fiat system used in Italian Pendolino trains.

== General Information ==
The trains were ordered for the Nürnberg to Hof, Bayreuth and Regensburg routes which include a large number of curves. The units worked well from 1992 to 2000 when cracks in the bogies meant they had to be taken out of service. The wheelsets were replaced and they were back in service in 2001.

== Liveries ==
The class now all wear the DB Red livery.

== Services ==
The class are used on services around Nürnberg to Regensburg, Hof and Bayreuth.

== Citations ==
- Garvin, Brian (2013). German Railways: The Complete Guide to All Locomotives and Multiple Units of Deutsche Bahn. Vol. 1. Sheffield, UK: Platform 5 Publishing. ISBN 978-1-9094-3103-4.
- Garvin, Brian (2015). German Railways: The Complete Guide to All Locomotives and Multiple Units of Deutsche Bahn. Vol. 2. Sheffield, UK: Platform 5 Publishing. ISBN 978-1-9094-3118-8.
- Erpenbeck, Dr. T.; Büttner, A.; Voges, Dr. V. (2006). "Tilting train technology at Deustsche Bahn AG - Prophecies, reality and necessary innovations" (PDF). UIC. Archived from the original (PDF) on 2016-02-19.

== See also ==
- 610 002 in DB Red
- A 610 at Neustadt
