= Indonesian railway signalling =

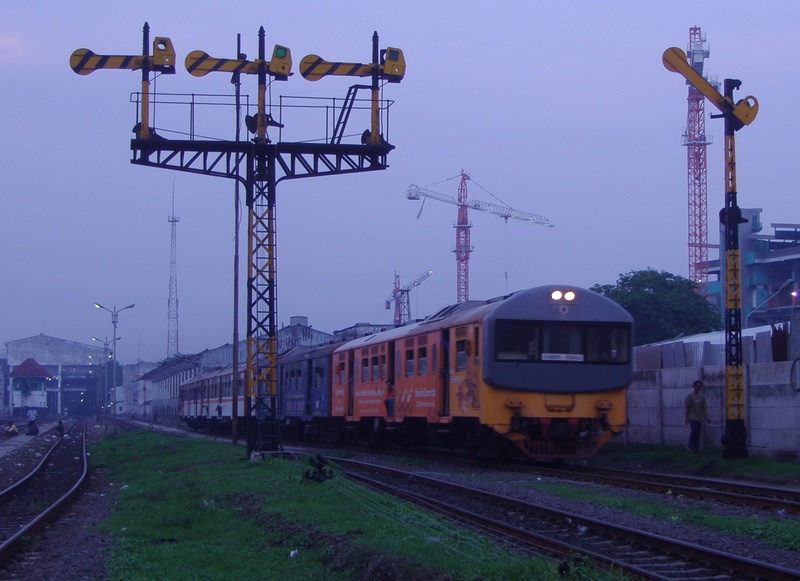
Semaphore signals on railway signal poles showing Signals 5 and 7

Various forms of railway signaling are used in Indonesia, where they are known as semboyan. They include messages and signs in the form of hand signals, voice, shapes, colour, or light placed in a place with a certain meaning to regulate and control train operations. Railway signal can be in the form of commands or prohibitions demonstrated through officers, or tools in the form of shapes, colours, or sounds including signals, signals, and signs; or notifications through marks about track conditions, distinctions, boundaries, and certain instructions.

Railway signalling in Indonesia is influenced by Dutch signalling system and follows the Utrecht Convention on Railway Signaling, especially the Siemens & Halske signalling, Alkmaar type signalling and the "krian" tebeng, which became the foundation of modern Indonesian mechanical signalling. Electrical signalling began to be introduced in Java in the 1970s when signalling installations at Bandung Station and Solo Balapan were carried out by PNKA/PJKA and Siemens Mobility. In the 1980s and continuing to accelerate until now, many mechanical signalling systems have changed to electrical for several reasons such as operational efficiency and increased train traffic related to the construction of double track.

The influence of Dutch signalling in Indonesian railways is outlined in Regulation 3 on Signals (drafted during the Staatsspoorwegen period and refined by the Railway Service), which was later revised in 2010 with Service Regulation 3 on Signals. The old regulation had different interpretations of colours, namely white as a sign of "safe", green as a sign of "limited speed", and red as a "danger sign". However, Service Regulation 3 regulates the colour green as a sign of "safe", and yellow as "limited speed". This regulation also influenced the Ministry of Transportation in drafting PM No. 10 of 2011 concerning Technical Requirements for Railway Signaling Equipment.

== Signalling Regulation ==
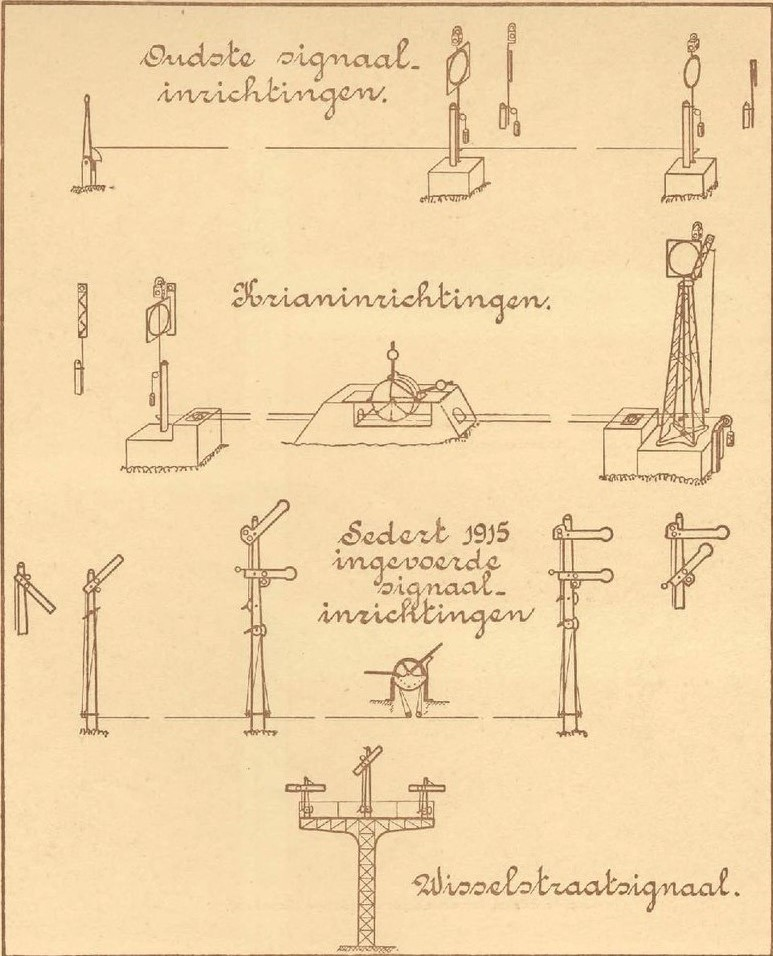
Various mechanical signalling of Staatsspoorwegen according to Warning Book of Staatsspoor- en Tramwegen in the Dutch East Indies 1875–1925

The latest railway signal in Indonesia is regulated in Service Regulation 3 of PT Kereta Api Indonesia concerning Signals and is effective according to the Decree of the Board of Directors of PT Kereta Api Indonesia Number KEP.U/HK.215/VII/1/KA-2010. It shows all the signals that need to be understood by all parties involved in the train journey (for example train dispatcher (pengatur perjalanan kereta api, PPKA), engine, conductor, signalman, and shunting officer).

This new regulation causes changes to a number of old signals, so that some are added, combined, or no longer used (no longer valid): Rarely used train signals (such as signals 22–28) are removed; signals that are added with new ones such as signals 8A-8P, 9A1-9J, and 10A-10L; signals that are combined (signals 14 and 15 become 14A-14B; signals 16 and 17 become 16A-16B, and signals 10 and 11 become 11A-11B).

Some old signals that are no longer needed or have been replaced, for example signal 27 which indicates crossing trains, previously used lights signals have now been replaced by the use of radio communication.

In the new Service Regulation there are also changes in colours, such as what was previously white becomes green as a sign of safety, and what was previously green becomes yellow as a sign of less safety.

== List of signals (semboyan) ==
The following is a list of train signals (semboyan in Indonesian) that apply at PT Kereta Api Indonesia. These signals are compiled based on PT Kereta Api Indonesia Service Regulation 3 on Signals as a replacement for Regulation 3 on Signals, and adapted nationally in the Regulation of the Minister of Transportation Number PM 10 of 2011 concerning Technical Requirements for Railway Signaling Equipment.

=== Railway signal ===
A railway signal (semboyan di jalur kereta api) is a railway signal that is placed on the right side of the railway track, except in certain conditions it can also be placed on the left side of the railway track. Railway signals are divided into temporary, permanent, switch, water funnel, weighbridge, and free space boundaries.

==== Temporary signal ====
A temporary signal (semboyan sementara) is a signal that is signalled by hand by PPKA or level crossing guards, or in the form of signs installed on the right side of the railway track; generally hand signals are signalled when there is a disturbance on the journey or passing through a path that must be passed at a limited speed and with caution.

=== Temporary sign ===
A temporary sign is a sign signalled by hand by PPKA or level crossing guards, or in the form of signs installed on the right side of the railroad tracks; generally a hand sign is signalled when there is a disturbance on the way or passing through a path that must be passed at a limited speed and with caution.

- Semboyan 1: PPKA or guard officer stands upright or carries a flag or green sign lamp (handsign) (at night) which is held parallel to the officer's thigh (not moved). Indicates that the path to be passed by the train has the status safe, the train may run as usual at the speed that has been set in the travel regulations. The purpose of the officer standing on the platform:
  - Safety equipment will not be serviced when the train passes through the station, because operating safety equipment faster than it should can cause danger.
  - Monitoring passing trains, especially the signs displayed by the train;
  - Monitoring the condition of the train, especially the equipment under the train (undercarriage) for possible damage that could endanger the safety of the train. The train driver saw the PPKA standing on the platform.
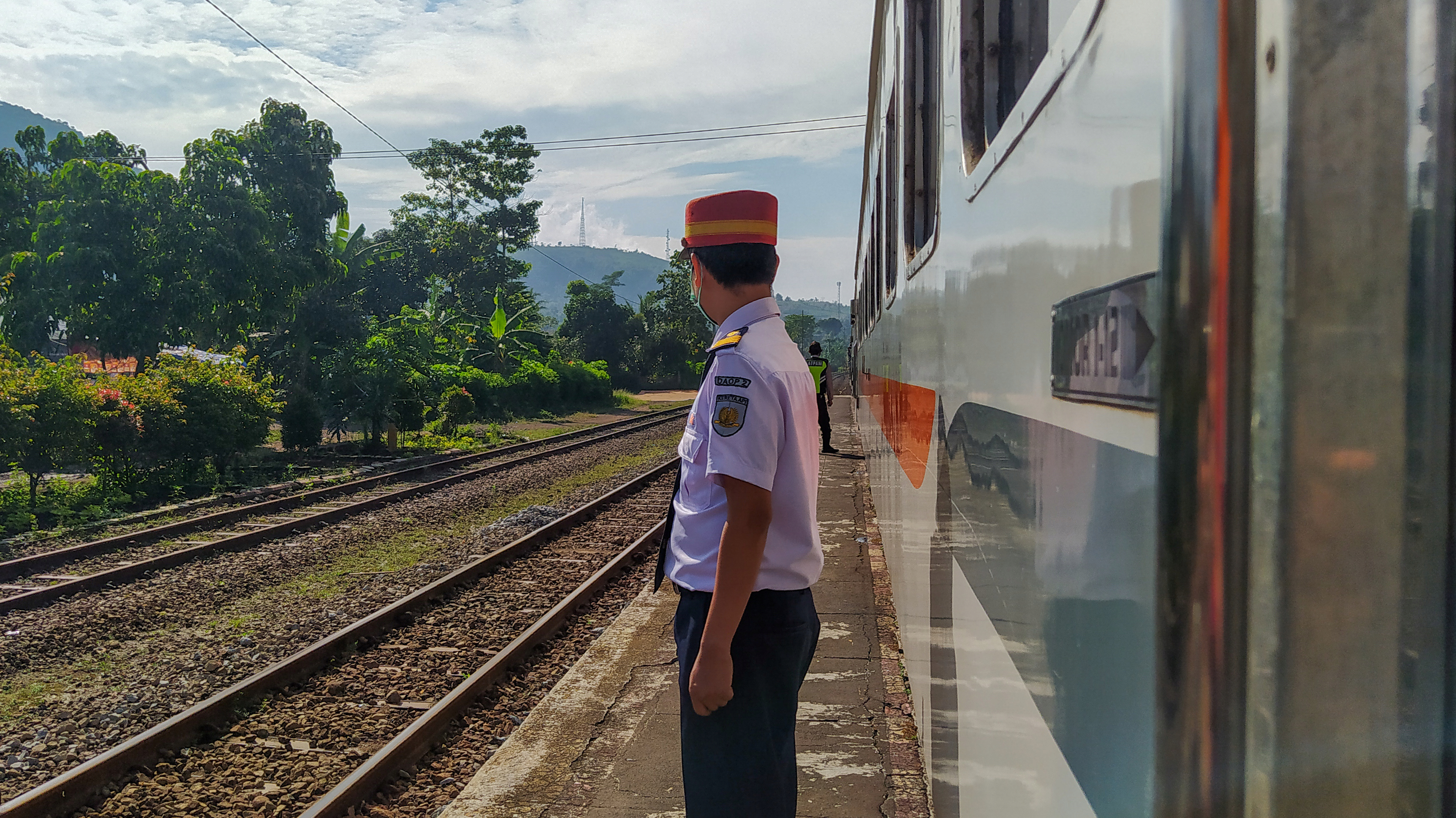
Signature 1, PPKA or officer ready
- Semboyan 2: Signature in the form of a rhombus with a yellow number symbol in the middle on a black background with a yellow border indicating that the train line to be passed has a speed limit according to the number symbol shown multiplied by 10 (eg: 6, meaning 60 kilometres per hour (37 mph)), and trains passing through it must adjust their speed according to the maximum speed limit (taspat) indicated by it.
  Signature 2 in the form of a rhombus sign and a speed limit divided by 10
- Semboyan 2A: Sign in the form of a round in yellow with a black border, or an officer holding out a yellow flag or a yellow handsign in his right hand. Indicates that the railway line to be passed is not safe, trains passing through it must be careful with a maximum speed limit of 40 kilometres per hour (25 mph).
  Sign 2A in the form of a yellow round sign or an officer waving a yellow flag
- Semboyan 2A1: A round yellow sign with a black border (above a black square marking with a white vertical line), or an officer holding out a yellow flag or a yellow handsign in his right hand. Indicates that electric trains passing through must be careful with a maximum speed limit of 40 kilometres per hour (25 mph).
  Sign 2A is a round yellow sign above a black square marking with a white vertical line or an officer waving a yellow flag
- Semboyan 2B: Two round yellow signs with black edges, or an officer holding out two yellow flags or a yellow handsign in his right hand. Indicates that the railway line to be passed is not safe, trains passing through it must be careful with a maximum speed limit of 20 kilometres per hour (12 mph).
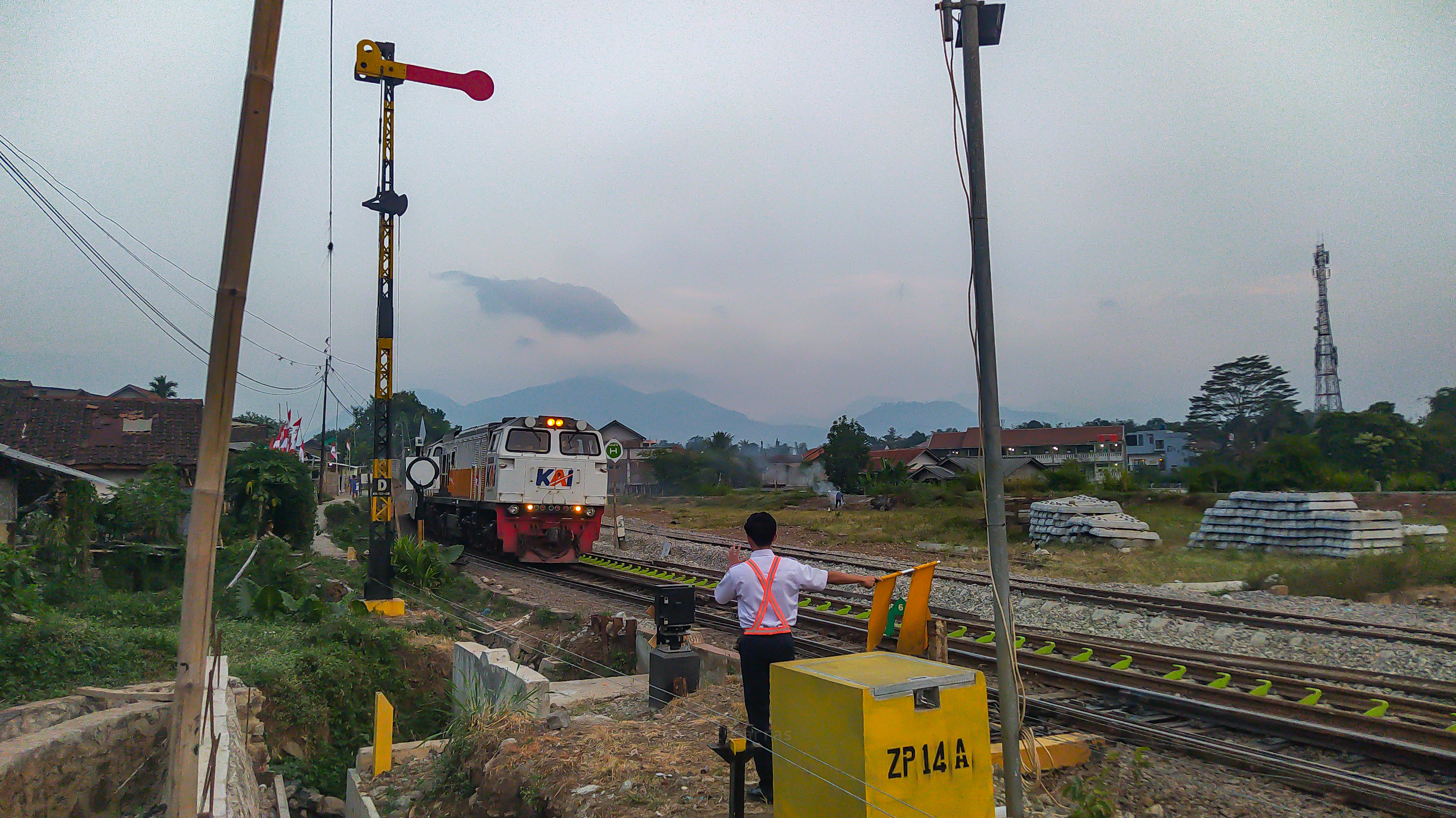
  Semboyan 2B in the form of two round yellow signs or an officer waving two yellow flags
- Semboyan 2B1: Two round yellow signs with black borders (above a black square marking with a white vertical line), or an officer holding two yellow flags or a yellow handsign in his right hand. Indicating that electric trains passing through must be careful with a maximum speed limit of 20 kilometres per hour (12 mph).
- Semboyan 2C: An officer carrying a yellow flag, a round yellow board, or a yellow handsign that is swung back and forth indicating that the railway line to be passed is not safe, trains passing through must be careful with a maximum speed limit of 5 kilometres per hour (3.1 mph) (as fast as a normal person walking).
- Semboyan 2H: A green rhombus sign with white edges with the letters H, HH, or HHH in white indicating that the train can now move at the permitted speed. H means "exhausted", which means "end of speed limit".
  - For trains up to 300 m (980 ft) in length, the train can move after passing the sign with the letter "H".
  - For trains 300–750 m (980–2,460 ft) in length, the train can move after passing the sign with the letters "HH".
  - For trains 750–1,000 m (2,460–3,280 ft) in length, the train can move after passing the sign with the letters "HHH".
  - * Semboyan 2H1: A green circular sign with a white border with a white letter H (above a black square marking with a white stripe). Indicates that the KRL or electric locomotive can move at the permitted speed.
- Semboyan 3: One red flag, red signal light, board with a red circular sign, officer raising both hands above head, or officer swinging a red handsign light. Indicates that the railway line to be passed is unsafe, trains passing through it are required to stop.
- Semboyan 4A: An officer raises a yellow rectangular board which means that the train will enter the signal which indicates a "stop" or passes the left track stop mark on a double track (if the train passes the left track). Trains can only move at maximum speed30 kilometres per hour (19 mph).
  Slogan 2: Beware of taspat 20 (KRL/electric locomotive driver)
  Semboyan 3: Stop
  Semboyan 2H: Taspat is finished (trains with a length of ≤ 300 m)
  Semboyan 2H: Taspat is finished (trains with a length of 300–750 m)
  Semboyan 2H: Taspat is finished (train with a length of 750–1,000 m)

=== Permanent sign (semboyan) ===
A permanent signal is a train signal in the form of a display that is installed in a fixed place and is located on the edge of the rail track. This signal consists of signals, signs, and markings.

==== Signal ====
The railway signalling in Indonesia is divided into two, namely mechanical signalling and electrical signalling. Mechanical signalling is the oldest railway signalling in Indonesia in the form of arm signals (semaphores) and tebeng signals. However, because train traffic on tracks with mechanical signals is getting denser, one by one the Indonesian railway signalling system is changed to electrical signals.

Semboyan 5: Go
	Slogan 5 is a permanent signal in the form of: The red board on the signal pole is not visible (tebeng signal); The arm on the signal board looks slanted (tebeng signal); The arm on the right side of the signal pole is slanted upwards (exit signal); or; The arm on the right side of the signal pole is slanted upwards and the other arm is horizontal (incoming signal); The light on the electric signal lights up green. Slogan 5 indicates that the railway line that will be passed has a safe status, trains that will pass through it are allowed to proceed at line speed.
Semboyan 6: Proceed carefully, speed is limited
	Semboyan 6 is the permanent signal which is: The arms on the signal board appear upright (tebeng signal); The arm to the right of the signal pole slopes upwards under the horizontal arm (incoming signal); or; The light on the electrical signal lights up yellow.; Symbol 6 indicates that the railway line to be passed is not safe, trains that will pass it are allowed to continue their journey at a limited speed and carefully.
Semboyan 6A: Caution, maximum speed 30
	Semboyan 6A is a permanent emergency symbol in the form of: A white light in the shape of a triangle or like the letter M is on, while the main aspect light is red.; The Semboyan 6A means that the train or other means of propulsion is travelling at a speed of no more than 30 kilometres per hour (19 mph)
Semboyan 6B: Allowed to shunt
	The Semboyan 6B is a permanent signal that consists of: Two arms on a mechanical shunt signal pole are seen diagonally forming the letter X, or; The red light is off and two white lights diagonally to the upper right are on.; The Semboyan 6B means that the train or other means of propulsion is allowed to shun.
Semboyan 7: Stop
	Semboyan 7 is a permanent sign in the form of: A red round board on the signal pole (tebeng signal); One horizontal arm on the right side of the signal pole (exit signal); Two horizontal arms on the right side of the signal pole (incoming signal); or; The light on the electric signal lights up red.; Semboyan 7 indicates that the railway line to be passed is unsafe, trains passing through it are required to stop (see also Semboyan 3).
Semboyan 7B: No shunting
	Semboyan 7B is a permanent signal in the form of: Two arms on a mechanical shunting signal pole are visible upright and overlapping, or; Red light on an electric shunting signal.; Semboyan 7B means that trains or other means of propulsion are not permitted to shunt.
Semboyan 9A1 : Main signal "go" or "proceed carefully"
	The Semboyan 9A1 is the permanent signal which is: the arm on the face signals slanting upwards, or green light on advance signal. The Semboyan 9A1 signal is an advance signal which indicates that the entry signal in front of it is safe, the train may enter.
Semboyan 9A2 : Caution, main signal "stop"
	The Semboyan 9A2 signal is the permanent signal which is: the arm on the signal face slopes downward, or yellow light on advance signal. The Semboyan 9A2 is an advance signal that indicates that the incoming signal in front of it is unsafe, the train is entering at a limited speed.
Semboyan 9B1 : Route not yet established
	Semboyan 9B1 is a permanent signal in the form of a small white light on the exit precursor signal (installed after the entry signal and before the exit signal) indicating that "the route has not been formed", meaning that the train is not yet allowed to enter the route of the track to be faced.
Semboyan 9B2: Exit signal "go" or "proceed carefully"
	The Semboyan 9B2 signal is a permanent signal in the form of a green light on the exit precursor signal indicating that the exit signal indication is safe or less safe.
Semboyan 9B3: Caution, exit signal "stop"
	Semboyan 9B3 is a permanent sign in the form of a yellow light on the exit precursor signal indicating that the exit signal indication is unsafe, the train must prepare to stop.
Semboyan 9C1: Main signal "go"
LED signal sign working on the 9C1 signal	The Semboyan 9C1 is a fixed signal in the form of a series of white LED lights on a square/circular electric repeater signal that looks perpendicular (vertical) indicating that the main signal (incoming and outgoing signals) is safe.
Semboyan 9C2: Main signal "proceed carefully"
LED signal signs showing the 9C2 signal	The 9C2 semboyan is a fixed signal in the form of a series of white LED lights on a square/circular electric repeater signal that looks diagonal (diagonal) indicating the main signal (incoming and outgoing signals) be careful/watch out.
Semboyan 9C3: Caution, main signal "stop"
	Semboyan 9C3 is a fixed watchword in the form of a series of white LED lights on a square/circular electric repeater signal that looks horizontal (horizontal) indicating that the main signal (incoming and outgoing signals) is unsafe/stopped.
Semboyan 9D: Outgoing signal "running" (a); Caution, outgoing signal "stop" (b)
	The Semboyan 9D is a fixed signal in the form of a mechanical repeater signal indicating the exit signal, and must be able to rotate 90 degrees. There are two possibilities: If the white board with the black-edged circle is visible (facing the train), then the exit signal indicates "stop", so be careful. If the white board with the black-edged circle is parallel to the rail (rotating 90 degrees), then the exit signal indicates "go", so be invited to enter.
Semboyan 9E1: Turn, maximum speed (number shown multiplied by 10)
	Slogan 9E1 is a permanent signal in the form of a lamp with a number lit on a diamond-shaped board above the entrance signal indicating that the train will go to the turning track (turning lane) and may enter at a maximum speed according to the number shown multiplied by 10 km/hour (for example, if the number 3 appears it means 30).
Semboyan 9E2: Straight
	The Semboyan 9E2 is a permanent signal in the form of a number lamp not lit on a diamond-shaped board above the entrance signal which indicates that the train will go to the flat track (straight track) and may enter.
Semboyan 9F: Turn, maximum speed (number shown multiplied by 10)
	Semboyan 9F is a permanent signal in the form of a number on a diamond-shaped board above the exit signal indicating that the train will depart from the turning track and may pass through it at a maximum speed according to the number shown multiplied by 10 km/hour (for example, if the number 3 appears it means 30).
Semboyan 9G: Head in indicated direction (left/right/straight)
	Semboyan 9G is a fixed sign in the form of an arrow above the track direction indicator signal indicating that the train is heading in the direction indicated by the arrow.
Semboyan 9H: Go to left track
	Signature 9H is a fixed sign in the form of a straight line, then slanting to the left, then straight, indicating that the train is entering the left track on a double track or double single track.
Semboyan 9J Signal: Depart from/go to the route (name the designated route number)
	The Semboyan 9J is a permanent signal in the form of a number on a square board which indicates that the train will enter the designated track number.

==== Signs ====
A sign is a type of permanent signal that provides instructions or certain information on the railway track. Signs are generally in the form of commands or prohibitions that must be obeyed by engine drivers or other train crew officers during the journey.

Signal 8: Approaching the incoming signal
	Signal 8 is a permanent signal in the form of 2 (two) large white metal boards (some are also yellow) each with two pillars that are erected on the right side of the rail track in the direction of the train's arrival, lined up in a row at a distance of 30 m with a diagonal position and easily visible and causing an echo/reflection of the locomotive's sound when the train passes. Signal 8 indicates that the train has approached the main entrance signal at a minimum distance of 1,000 metres.
Signature 8A
	Signature 8A is a fixed signal indicating an entrance signal indication. This sign has two boards, the upper one is in the shape of a rhombus, and the lower one is in the shape of a square with a circular edge. This board must be able to rotate 90 degrees, so that the board can face the station or be parallel to the rails. This sign is addressed to the PPKA. There are three possibilities: If the upper and lower boards face the station, then it shows two horizontal entrance signal arms (signature 7).; If the upper board faces the station and the lower one is parallel to the rails, then the entrance signal arm is slanted upwards below the horizontal one (signature 6).; If the top board is parallel to the rail and the bottom is facing the station, then the incoming signal arm slopes upwards above the horizontal one (signature 5).
Signal 8B
	The 8B signal is a fixed signal that shows the exit signal indication sign. This sign is in the form of a light that can be on or off. This sign is addressed to the PAP (Platform Supervisor). There are two possibilities: If the light is on, then the exit signal shows a "safe" or "caution" indication. If the light is off, then the outgoing signal shows an "unsafe" indication.
Signature 8C: Caution, approaching the left lane entry signal/stop sign
	Signature 8C is a permanent sign in the form of a yellow circle sign on the left side of the track on a double track with a front signal marking and the words MJ accompanied by the entry signal number (eg: MJ10) indicating that trains passing through the left lane may enter at a limited speed.
8D Signal: Stop
	8D signal is a permanent signal in the form of a red circle sign on the left side of the track on a double track with the word J accompanied by an incoming signal number (eg: J10) indicating that trains passing through the left track must stop.
8E Signal: Shunt limit
	8E Signal is a permanent signal in the form of a black square board with a red line forming the letter X which means the limit of stopping the shunt movement.
8F Signal: Shunt limit, dead end
	8F signal is a permanent signal in the form of a black square board with red lines forming the letter X and a black rectangular board with white lines that mean the limit of the shunting movement at the end of the track.
8G Signal: Dead end
	8G Signal is a permanent signal in the form of a red round board and a black rectangular board with white lines that means the end of the track where all trains, including their shunters, must not exceed the limit of the sign.
8H1 Signal
	8H1 Signal is a permanent signal specifically for KRL in the form of a yellow square board with a red blankspot area symbol indicating that KRL or electric locomotives are requested to empty their power when entering a non-voltage overhead linenetwork.
8H2 Signal
	8H2 Signal is a permanent signal specifically for KRL in the form of a green square board with a red blankspot area symbol indicating that KRL or electric locomotives can run as usual.
8J1 signal: Switching power supply
alt=8J1 signal from above the railway line of the Station Ancol to the east	The 8J1 signal is a special permanent signal for KRL in the form of a yellow square board with a red power supply switch symbol indicating that KRL or electric locomotives are prohibited from stopping when entering the overhead line power supply switch.
8J2 signal: Normal power supply
	The 8J2 signal is a special permanent signal for KRL in the form of a green square board with a red power supply switch symbol indicating that KRL or electric locomotives can run as usual.
8K Signal: Sound the horn
	8K signal is a permanent signal in the form of a black board with white S.35 written on it, which means that the engineer must sound the horn signal 35 when passing the sign.
8L Signal: Change radio channel
	8L Signal is a permanent signal in the form of a black square board with a white antenna image which means that the engineer is asked to change the locomotive's radio channel.
8M Signal: Overhead line start
	8M Signal is a permanent signal in the form of a white square board with a red lightning bolt image which means that the train will enter the initial area of the overhead power network voltage.
8N Signal: End of overhead line, stop
	8N Signal is a permanent signal in the form of a white square board with a red lightning bolt crossed out in white, which means that it is the end area of the overhead power network voltage. KRL/electric locomotive drivers are not allowed to cross this boundary mark.
8P signal: Breaker switch indicator
8P signal board that appears at the Lebak Bulus MRT Depot exit access	8P signal is a permanent signal in the form of a yellow square board with a red switch symbol which means that the driver will pass the breaker switch. If the switch is on, then the KRL is allowed to pass the switch.
8R Signal: Emplacement boundary
Appearance of the 8R Signal board on track 1 of Tanah Abang Station emplacement	The 8R signal is a permanent signal in the form of a black square board with the writing "8R" in white which indicates the boundary between the station emplacement and the depot, building hall, or industry emplacement.

==== Markings ====
Markings are permanent signs that inform about track conditions, distinctions, boundaries, or certain instructions. Markings are different from signs, signs generally give orders or prohibitions to the train crew on duty.

Semboyan 10A
	Signature 10A is a permanent sign in the form of a black square board with a white diagonal line from the top right to the bottom left which means that the signal in question is an advance signal.
Semboyan 10B
	Slogan 10B is a permanent signal in the form of a black square board with a horizontal white line which means that the signal in question is a block signal.
Semboyan 10C
10C Signal found in the middle of Purworejo rice fields	10C Signal is a permanent signal in the form of a black square board with two horizontal white lines which means that the signal in question is an intermediate block signal.
Semboyan 10D
	The 10D signal is a permanent signal in the form of a black square board with a white arrow indicating that the signal is on the left side of the track. More easily understood is that the signal above this signal is used for the party to the right of the signal.
Semboyan 10E
	10E Signal is a permanent signal on a black rectangular board with the letter W followed by numbers (example: W. 139) which means that it is a mechanical/electric point machine.
Semboyam 10F: Incoming signal visible
	Slogan 10F is a permanent signal in the form of a black square board with the letter T (visible) perforated which means that the incoming signal distance is 1,000 metres.
Semboyan 10G
	10G signal is a permanent signal in the form of: A black square board with a white plus sign (+) or; White rail sleepers (minimum 2 sleepers).; 10G signal indicates the stop limit markings at the station.
Semboyan 10H
	10H Signal is a permanent signal in the form of a yellow rail sleeper which means that railroad maintenance personnel are requested to be careful when carrying out railroad maintenance so as not to cause damage to the train detection device.
Semboyan 10J: Descent/incline/flat
	Slogan 10J is a permanent signal in the form of two arms (tebeng) that are straight or slanted with the writing of the large change in slope (in per mil) which indicates the change in the gradient of the railroad track. The black colour indicates the gradient faced by the officer related to the train journey and the white colour indicates the gradient that will be faced next. Description: a. Flat gradient facing an incline b. Downhill gradient facing flat c. Uphill gradient facing flat d. Flat gradient facing a decline e. Uphill gradient facing an incline f. Downhill gradient facing a decline g. Slope of descent facing an ascent h. Slope of ascent facing a descent
Semboyan 10K
	Semboyan 10Kis a permanent signal in the form of a marker with kilometre and hundred digits that indicate the location or position on the railroad track. The hundred digits are measured in metres and placed above the kilometre digits. The markers are installed every hundred metres.
Semboyan 10L
	Semboyan 10L is a permanent signal in the form of a curved information board that is mounted on the ground and contains complete data regarding the curve information and the permitted speed limit. The information in question is generally in the form of track width, length, height, curve angle, curve number, radius, and permitted speed limit.

=== Switch signal (semboyan wesel) ===
A switch signal is a signal that indicates the direction of the track to be taken when passing a branch in the rail line (switch) when a train enters or leaves a station. The railway line that branches into two uses the regular switch system, while the railway line that intersects uses the English switch system.

Semboyan 11A: Switch goes straight
Signature 11A is a switch signal in the form of: A green board in the shape of a rhombus; An arrow on the switch pole (parallel to the track axis); The switch boards are visible showing green glass or a square green board on the side of the switch; A green glowing light can be seen on the switch position board on the switch position pole or on the side of the switch (at night).; Signal 11A indicates that when a train line leads to a flat or straight track, trains may travel at the specified speed.
Semboyan 11B: Switch, heading towards a turn
Slogan 11B is the bill of exchange signal which is in the form: The yellow board is circle; The arrow on the billpost is at right angles to the axis of the track or in accordance with the direction of turning of the track; The switch position board is visible showing yellow circle on the side of the switch; The switch lights on the switch pole are visible in yellow or yellow on the white side (at night; the white light indicates the direction to the turning track).; The 11B signal indicates that the switch/branch of the railway line leads to the turning track or turns, the train may travel at a maximum speed of 30 kilometres per hour.
Semboyan 12A: Beware, double slip switch, heading straight
The 12A signal is a switch signal that indicates the direction of the turning track on the English switch which is in the form of: The square board on the switch pole shows green in both directions, or; The switch lights are green in both directions.; The 12A signal indicates that the English switch is cross-served. Both directions are heading to the flat track or straight.
Semboyan 12B: Beware, double slip switch, heading towards a turn
Signature 12B is a signal signal that indicates the direction of the turn of the train on an English switch in the form of: The square board on the switch stem shows yellow in both directions, or; The switch lights are yellow in both directions.; Signature 12B indicates that the English switch is served crosswise. Both directions are heading towards the turning track or turning.
Semboyan 13A: Beware, double slip switch
Signature 13A is a switch symbol that indicates the direction of the track turn at the English switch, which is in the form of: A vertical white line on the English switch light wall; A vertical white light line on the English switch light wall.; Signature 13A indicates that the English switch is served parallel to the flat track that is in the same direction or almost in the same direction as the main track.
Semboyan 13B: Beware, double slip switch
Signature 13B is a switch symbol that indicates the direction of the track turn at the English switch, which is: A diagonal white line on the English switch light wall; A diagonal white light line on the English switch light wall.; Signature 13B indicates that the English switch is parallel to the flat track that is not in the same direction as the main track.
Semboyan 13C: Beware, double slip switch
Slogan 13C is a bill of exchange signal which indicates the direction of turning of the gauge on an English bill of exchange in the form: The white line on the wall of the money order lantern is half vertical and half oblique, pointing to the direction of the train that is not parallel to the main train or vice versa.; The white glowing white line on the wall of the money order lantern is half vertical and half oblique, pointing to a train that is not parallel to the main line or vice versa.; The signal 13C indicates that English bills of exchange are served parallel to the plate track in the same direction as the track that is not in the same direction as the main track or vice versa.

=== Other signals (semboyan lain) ===
Other signals include the signals water funnel, weighbridge, and clearance limit. A water funnel is a device used to introduce water into the boiler of a steam locomotive. A weighbridge is a device used to weigh the mass of a passing train. Clearance limit is a diagram used to determine the maximum height and width dimensions of a facility train and its load.

Semboyan 14A
Slogan 14A is a signal in the form of a light or sign (yellow) on a water funnel that is not lit/not visible which states that the water funnel does not obstruct the road.
Semboyan 14B
Slogan 14B is a signal in the form of a light or sign (red) on a water funnel that is lit/visible which states that the water funnel obstructs the road.
Semboyan 16A
Slogan 16A is a signal in the form of a light or sign (yellow) on a weighbridge that is not lit/not visible, stating that the weighbridge may be passed.
Semboyan 16B
Slogan 16B (formerly signal 17) is a signal in the form of a light or sign (red) on a weighbridge that is lit/visible, stating that the weighbridge may not be passed.
Semboyan 17: Beware taspat (numbers as stated)
Slogan 17 in Service Regulation 3 is a permanent signal in the form of a sign with numbers indicating the speed limit of the train when weighing.
Semboyan 18: Free space limit/preipal, stop
Slogan 18 is a signal in the form of a marker or other sign indicating that the train must not exceed the free space mark. This signal aims to prevent trains from touching each other.

=== Train signal (semboyan kereta api) ===
A train signal is a signal given by a train driver or crew officer regarding the conditions of the road to be travelled, using light signals, sound, flags, signs, or other media.

=== Visible signal ===
A visible signal is a train signal given by the engine driver or train crew officer regarding the road conditions to be passed, using sign lights, flags, signs, or other media. Specifically for signal 22–28 are removed in Service Regulation 3 because they are rarely used, except when the train carrying the signal crosses or is followed by an extraordinary train (KLB) or an optional train (only operated on certain days). In addition, it also provides a warning to people or animals that a train will pass.

Semboyan 20
Signal 20 is a visible signal in the form of a main light that lights up at one, two or three points on a train locomotive, especially at night, in poor visibility or in situations where it is needed. This signal functions to: Indicate the head end or initial axle of the train set and also.; As a sign or signal that the locomotive or train is moving towards the light that is on.; A signal that the train will pass in the direction of the light, so that users/vehicles/the public move away from the path that will be crossed.
Semboyan 21
Signal 21 is a visible sign in the form of a red sign or light on the right and left sides of a train/carriage, indicating the tail end of the train.
Semboyan 22 (deleted)
Signal 22 is a visible signal in the form of a green triangular board installed on the right & left sides of the locomotive, at night using green side signal lights giving signals in the form of: Announcement of Optional Trains / Extraordinary Trains (KLB) running in the opposite direction after the train carrying the signal passes.
Semboyan 23 (deleted)
Semboyan 24 (deleted)
Signal 24 is a visible signal in the form of a red triangular board installed on the right & left side of the locomotive, when at night using red side signal lights gives a signal in the form of: Announcement of Optional Trains / Extraordinary Trains (KLB) running in the opposite direction the next day before the first train passes.
Semboyan 25 (deleted)
Semboyan 26 (deleted)
Signal 26 is a visible sign in the form of a round board on the front of the locomotive containing a green triangle, when at night using a green center sign light gives a signal in the form of: Announcement of cancellation / Merging of trains; this sign is displayed by the first train running in the opposite direction to the train that was cancelled / merged with the train behind it.
Semboyan 27 (deleted)
Signal 27 is a visible sign in the form of a round board on the front of the locomotive containing a red triangle, when at night using a red center sign light gives a signal in the form of: Train crossing showing this sign is moved.
Semboyan 28 (deleted)
Semboyan 30
Signal 30 is a visible signal in the form of an officer on a passing train giving a signal in the form of: a green flag, a green round board, or other media. Slogan 30 functions to inform officers (especially to PPKA who are giving signal 1) at the station or guard post that the road that has just been passed is in poor condition.
Semboyan 31
Signal 31 is a visible signal in the form of a locomotive equipped with two red flags which means that the path passed by this train is unsafe or dangerous.

==== Voice semboyan ====
A voice signal (semboyan suara) is a signal that is sent using voice. PPKA, conductor, or train crew officers send voice signals through a mouthpiece, bugle, or whistle; while engine driver sends voice signals through locomotive horn.

Semboyan 35
Semboyan 35 CC206 The distinctive whistle sound on the locomotive CC206.	Semboyan 35 is a sound signal that is done by the engineer sounding the locomotive's horn for a few seconds to answer the train conductor and PPKA that the train is ready to depart. Sometimes it is also sounded when passing a level crossing or in certain places to get the attention of people or animals to move away from the railroad tracks.
Semboyan 36
	Semboyan 36 is a sound signal that is heard through the locomotive flute and sounded by the engineer in the form of one short sound, together with a request for a little brake engagement.
Semboyan 37
	Semboyan 37 is a sound signal that is heard through the locomotive horn and sounded by the engineer in the form of three short sounds, together with a request for a hard brake engagement.
Semboyan 38
	Semboyan 38 is a sound signal that is heard through the locomotive horn and sounded by the engineer in the form of two short sounds, together with a request to release the brakes.
Semboyan 39
	Semboyan 39 is a sound signal that is done by the engineer sounding the locomotive horn briefly and repeatedly to inform that there is an event/danger.
Semboyan 39A
	Semboyan 39A is an audible signal made by the engineer sounding the locomotive's horn briefly and repeatedly every 20 seconds to inform that the train is running on the left track (running on the track on the left) or is on the wrong track. If the train is indeed diverted to the left track (intentionally), then the signal 39 is only used when passing the guard post. On double tracks, the signal 39A is sounded if the train passes the left track on the double track.
Semboyan 40
	Semboyan 40 is a signal carried out by PPKA officers by: lifting a stick with a round sign (eblek) in green with white edges and sounding a short flute/selompret several times; or; playing a mouth flute/selompret through the station's loudspeaker accompanied by a flashing green light box; Semboyan 40 indicates that the status of the track to be passed is safe, and the train is allowed to depart. Slogan 40 is usually accompanied by signal 41 and responded to with signal 35 by the train driver.
Semboyan 41
	Semboyan 41 is an audible signal indicated by: conductor playing a long flute, or; the sound of a long flute over the station loudspeaker with two flashing green light boxes; Signature 41 signals that the train is cleared to depart. Signature 41 is responded to by the engineer's signal 35. This practice is not applied to train services that are not equipped with conventional conductors such as KAI Bandara or Commuter Line. The system was replaced with show-call signal 40 carried out by train service officers (customer service).

=== Yarding signal (semboyan langsir) ===
A Yarding signal is a signal given by a shuttle officer to a shuttle engineer in the form of a signal to go forward, backward, stop, slowly, or pass a level crossing. Shuttle signals use hand signals and whistles, mouth flutes, or bugles. If the shuttle officer sends a shuttle signal to the engineer on duty, the engineer must respond by sounding the locomotive horn (Semboyan 51).

Semboyan 45
Semboyan 45 is a shunting signal which during the day is a red skip on the front left end and the rear right end of the locomotive or vice versa and at night is a spotlight on and a yellow signal light on the front of the locomotive on the right side lights up white. Semboyan 45 indicates that the locomotive carrying the signal is/will be performing shunting operation.
Semboyan 46: Forward
Semboyan 46 is a shunter's signal given to the engineer in the form of the shunter raising his hand up which indicates that the shunter is ordering the engineer to move his locomotive forward.
Semboyan 47: Backward
Semboyan 47 is a shunter's signal given to the engineer in the form of the shunter swinging his hand down which indicates that the shunter is ordering the engineer to move his locomotive backward.
Semboyan 47A: Slowly
Semboyan 47A is a shunting signal given to the train driver in the form of a shunting driver stretching his arms parallel to his shoulders (like semboyan 2A or 2B) which indicates that the shunting driver is ordering the train driver to move his locomotive slowly.
Semboyan 48: Stop
Semboyan 48 is a shunting signal given to the train driver in the form of a shunting driver raising both hands above (like signal 3) which indicates that the shunting driver is ordering the train driver to stop his locomotive.
Semboyan 49: Tolak-setut (deleted)
Semboyan 50: Awas, perlintasan
Semboyan 50 is a shunting signal given by the train driver in the form of a locomotive horn sound because when shunting it will pass a level crossing (long-short-short, long-short-short horn sound), to give a warning to the public that there will be a shunting at the level crossing.
Semboyan 51
Semboyan 51 means that the engineer sounds the locomotive horn for every shunting signal given to him by the shunting officer via a mouthpiece, trumpet, or whistle, as a sign that the engineer understands the shunting command.

=== Bell signal (semboyan genta) ===
The bell signal involves a bell (bell) in the train travel controller (PPKA) or platform supervisor (PAP) room of a train station or at a level crossing. The bell is operated by electromagnetic induction by a PPKA or PAP officer at the station. Each series of bell sounds consists of five double strikes, and each double strike consists of two different sounds. This signal is sent to the crossing guard or PPKA of the next station that there will be news about the departure, arrival, or cancellation of a train trip.

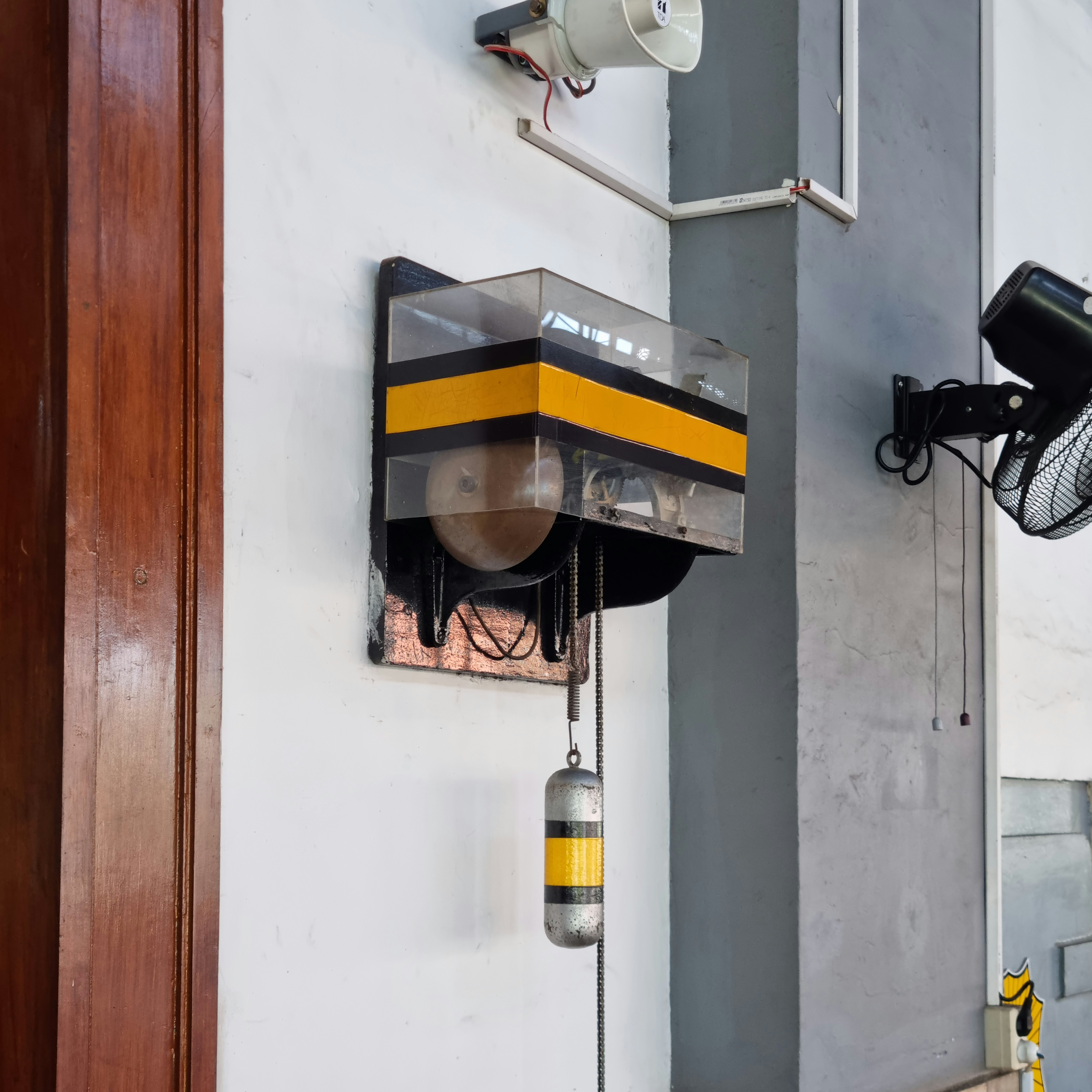
Semboyan 55A1 dan 55A2
Semboyan 55A1 and 55A2 are signals that mean there is news. Semboyan 55A1 means the train is heading downstream (going to the final destination), while 55A2 means the train is heading upstream (returning to the initial destination). Semboyan 55A1 is sounded with one series of bells, while signal 55A2 is sounded with two series of bells.
Semboyan 55B
Semboyan 55B is a signal that means cancellation. This signal is sounded with four series of bells.
Semboyan 55C
Semboyan 55C is a signal that means a dangerous event. This signal is sounded with eight series of bells.
Semboyan 55D
Semboyan 55D is a signal that means the end of service. This signal is sounded with three series of bells.
Semboyan 56
Semboyan 56 is a signal that means a trial signal. This signal is sounded with five series of bells.

== Obsolete signalling devices ==
=== Tebeng and Krian signals ===
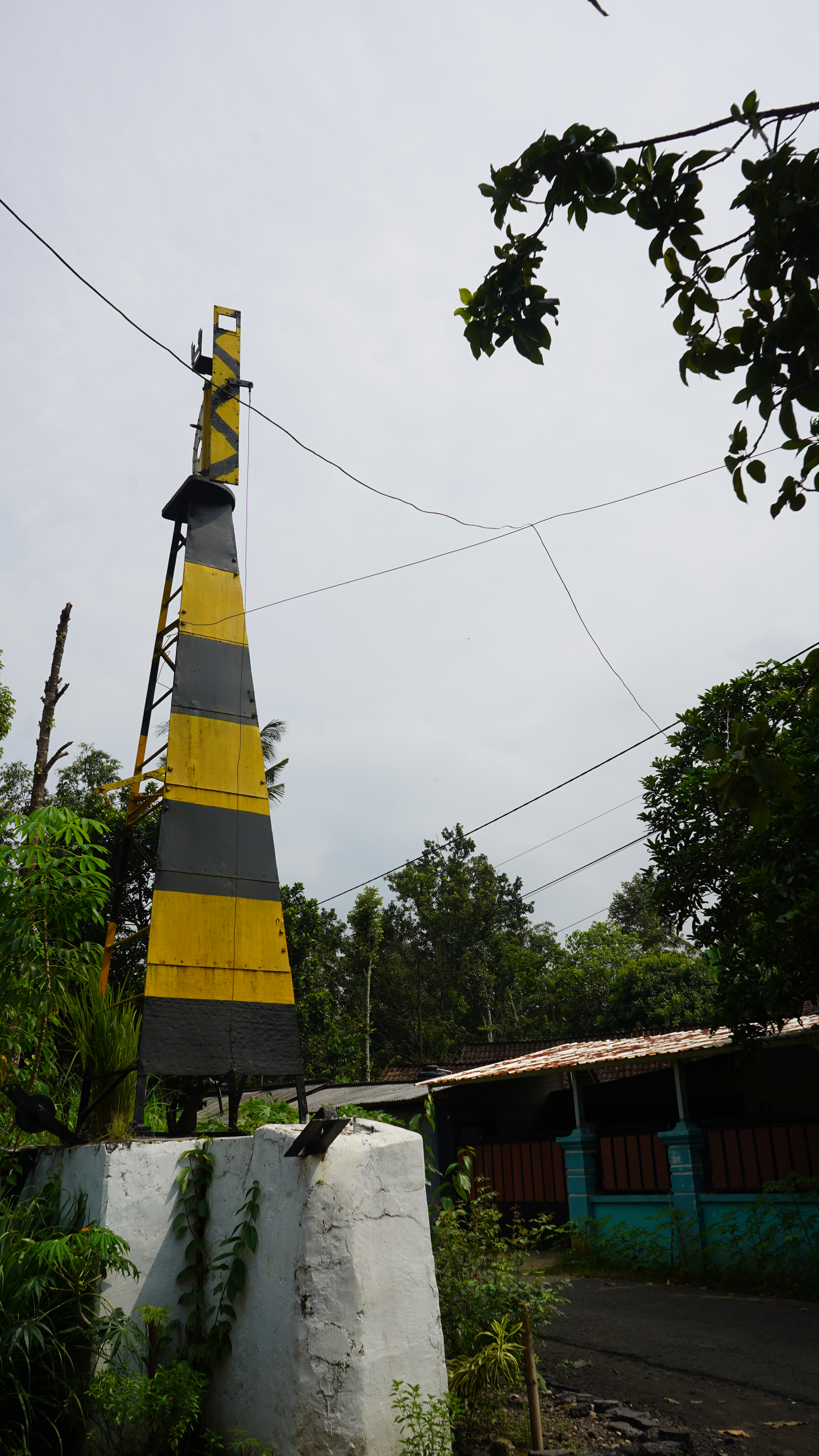
Krian signal display at Tamanan Station

The Tebeng signalling device was the first railway signalling equipment used on Staatsspoorwegen lines since it first operated in 1878. The Krian signalling device (Dutch: Krianinrichting) was a development of the Tebeng signal, which used a tall tower equipped with locking equipment. The name of this signalling equipment is attributed to Krian Station, a railway station in Sidoarjo Regency, which was also the first station to use the signalling. The last railway line to use the Krian signal was the Kalisat–Panarukan railway line, which was closed in 2004. It is recorded that the Krian signal has been preserved at Krian Station, Tamanan Station, Ambarawa Railway Museum, and Garut Station.

The Krian signal is moved using a lever installed near the station's PPKA room, causing the tebeng to move and The driver will follow the aspect indicated by the tebeng-tebeng. Krian signals can have two or three aspects. In the two-aspect krian signal, the "stop" aspect is indicated by a red board that can be seen by the driver, while the "go" or "walk carefully" aspect is indicated by a red board that is moved 90 degrees so that it is not visible to the driver. Meanwhile, in the three-aspect krian signal, the "stop" aspect is indicated by a red board that can be seen by the driver, the "walk carefully" aspect is indicated by an invisible red board, with an upright arm, and the "walk" aspect is indicated by an arm that looks diagonal.

== See also ==
- Dutch railway signalling
- Communication Based Train Control (signalling system)
- Gantry
- Institution of Railway Signal Engineers
- Railroad chronometer
- Rail sabotage
- Railway slide fence
- Signalling block system
- Signalling control
- Train speed optimisation
- Wrong-side failure
- Norwegian railway signalling
- Jakarta Monorail
- Polsuska
- Transport in Indonesia
- List of named passenger trains of Indonesia
- List of railway stations in Indonesia
- List of railway companies in the Dutch East Indies
- List of defunct railway in Indonesia
- List of active railway in Indonesia
- List of Kereta Api Indonesia rolling stock classes
- List of locomotives in Indonesia
- Trams in Surabaya
- Bali MRT
