= Dutch railway signalling =

The current Dutch railway signalling system operated by ProRail has been in effect since 1954 on the Nederlandse Spoorwegen network. As such, it is also referred to as NS'54.

It was designed to be one of the simplest in Europe and is integrated to the ATB, the system of cab signalling widespread on the Dutch network.

Dutch trains normally use the right-hand track and the signals are placed at the right of the track; in sections also equipped to run on the left track, the signals are placed on the left.

== Light signals ==
Below are common forms:

- raised (hooggeplaatst) signal, can be used anywhere;
- ground (laaggeplaatst) or dwarf (dwergsein) signal, used in areas where speeds do not exceed 40 km/h (do not have numeric display)
- distant signal (voorsein).

Their aspects are categorized according to the colour. (There is never more than one colour at a time):

=== Green Aspect ===
- Green: proceed at line speed (in the case of a dwarf signal, speed restricted to 40 km/h);
- Flashing green: proceed with restricted speed, max. 40 km/h;
- Flashing green with number: proceed speed restricted, max. 10× the displayed number in km/h

=== Yellow Aspect ===
- Yellow: reduce speed to max 40 km/h (the next signal may display a red aspect);
- Yellow with number displayed: reduce speed to 10× the displayed number in km/h. Signalled speed must be reached at the next signal;
- Yellow with flashing number displayed: reduce speed (to 10× the displayed digit in km/h), and keep the brake applied if the next signal shows an aspect indicating a lower speed than signalled speed (used to signal short sections);
- Flashing yellow: proceed on sight (track beyond the signal may be occupied (such as in shunting operations)).

=== Red Aspect ===
- Red: stop in front of the signal;
- Flashing red: stop in front of the signal (used for sections that are out of order for engineering works).

== Speed displays ==
Reference speed of the line (10x the displayed digit in km/h) allows the speed increase to the indicated value (if absent: 125 km/h) when the rear of the train has passed the display.
Speed restriction announcement: reduce speed to the indicated value (10x the displayed digit in km/h) before the speed restriction sign.
Speed restriction (10x the displayed digit in km/h) when the front of the train has passed the display. It indicates both the start of the speed restricted zone (indicated by the yellow triangle on edge) or the permission to accelerate to a speed lower than the reference speed of the line (in that case, after the rear of the train has passed the sign).

== See also ==
- Automatische treinbeïnvloeding, also known as ATB
- Indonesian railway signalling
