= Norwegian railway signalling =

Rail traffic control systems used in Norway

The signalling system used on the rail transport in Norway is regulated by Trafikkregler for jernbanenettet (TJN).

The first signalling system on the Norwegian railway system was a mechanically operated semaphore system introduced at Drammen station in 1893. The first electrically operated light signal system was delivered by AEG in 1924. Today, only electrically operated light signals are used.

== Train radio ==
Between 1993 and 1996, NSB rolled out the analog train radio system Scanet. Developed by Ascom Radiocom, it was only installed on the primary railway lines. The system allows radio communication between a train dispatcher, and train drivers and other users involved in railway operations. Scanet was also connected to the automatic train control system. However, several lines lack the system, including the Arendal Line, the Flåm Line, the Meråker Line, the Nordland Line, the Rauma Line, the Røros Line, the Inner Østfold Line, the northern part of the Gjøvik Line, and several tunnels along the Bergen Line and the Sørland Line. The Åsta accident in 2000 spurred the need to give all parts of the railway coverage with train radio. On these lines, the dispatcher and drivers had to communicate using the Nordic Mobile Telephone (NMT 450) standard, a system which the operator Telenor discontinued in 2002.

Scanet was replaced by Global System for Mobile Communication – Railway (GSM-R) between 2004 and 2007, with the systems first being installed on the lines without Scanet. The system, delivered by Nokia Siemens Networks, was on time and on budget, and made Norway one of the first countries to fully implement the system throughout Europe. After GSM-R was fully implemented on 1 November, Scanet was gradually closed. The new system has been characterized as simpler to use and giving better audio quality than Scanet. The implementation cost 1.8 billion Norwegian krone and covers the entire network.

== Means of signalling ==
The following means of signalling are used:

- Signal flags
- Hand-held signal lamps
- Signal whistle
- Arm signals
- Fixed light signals
- Fixed sound signals
- Signal signs
- Orientation posts
- Locomotive whistle
- Locomotive and train signal lamps

== The fundamental meaning of the signal colors ==
- Red always indicates "stop".
- Violet indicates that the associated level crossing signal is showing "Stop short of the level crossing".
- Yellow indicates "caution".
- Green indicates "permission to run".
- White indicates "clear line".

== Light signals ==
Light signals show one of the following aspects:

=== Main signals ===
Signal	Meaning	Used in
Signal 20A – Stop – flashes	The train must stop at least 20 metres from the signal. If a red and white striped pole exists, the train must stop in front of it.	Station entry signals, block signals.
Signal 20B – Stop	The train must stop short of the signal.	Station exit signals, inner signals.
Signal 21 – Proceed at reduced speed	The train can proceed at a reduced speed.	Station entry signals, station exit signals, inner signals.
Signal 22 – Proceed	The train can proceed.	Station entry signals, station exit signals, inner signals, block signals.

==== Fail safe ====
If one of the green lights in signal 22 fails, the indication becomes the lower speed signal 21 – this is fail-safe. Other nearby countries reverse the role of the single green aspect and double green aspect.

=== Distant signals ===
Image	Signal	Meaning
	Signal 23 – Expect stop	The associated main signal shows signal 20A or 20B.
	Signal 24 – Expect to proceed at reduced speed	The associated main signal shows signal 21.
	Signal 25 – Expect to proceed	The associated main signal shows signal 22.

==== Wrong-side failure ====
If the yellow light in signal 24 fails, the signal displays a higher speed indication, which would be a wrong-side failure. To prevent this, a current transformer in the lamp circuit monitors the current through the yellow lamp. If the yellow lamp fails, a relay will also switch off the green light and the signal becomes totally dark, which is then treated as "expect stop." A capacitor in the relay circuit ensures that the relay operation is a couple of seconds delayed, to prevent the relay operating for every blink. Hence, if the yellow lamp does suddenly fail, the green light will blink alone 1-2 times before it is switched off by the relay.

== Warning systems ==
Norway uses the Ericsson ATP warning system, also used on Perth's suburban railway network.
