= Bavarian railway signals =

The Royal Bavarian State Railways had their own Bavarian railway signals for decades until they were gradually replaced by Deutsche Reichsbahn semaphore signals following the merger of all the German state railways into the newly created Deutsche Reichseisenbahnen in 1920. Bavarian home signals were still being used by the Deutsche Bahn until 2002 and Bavarian distant signals even after that.

== Distant signals ==
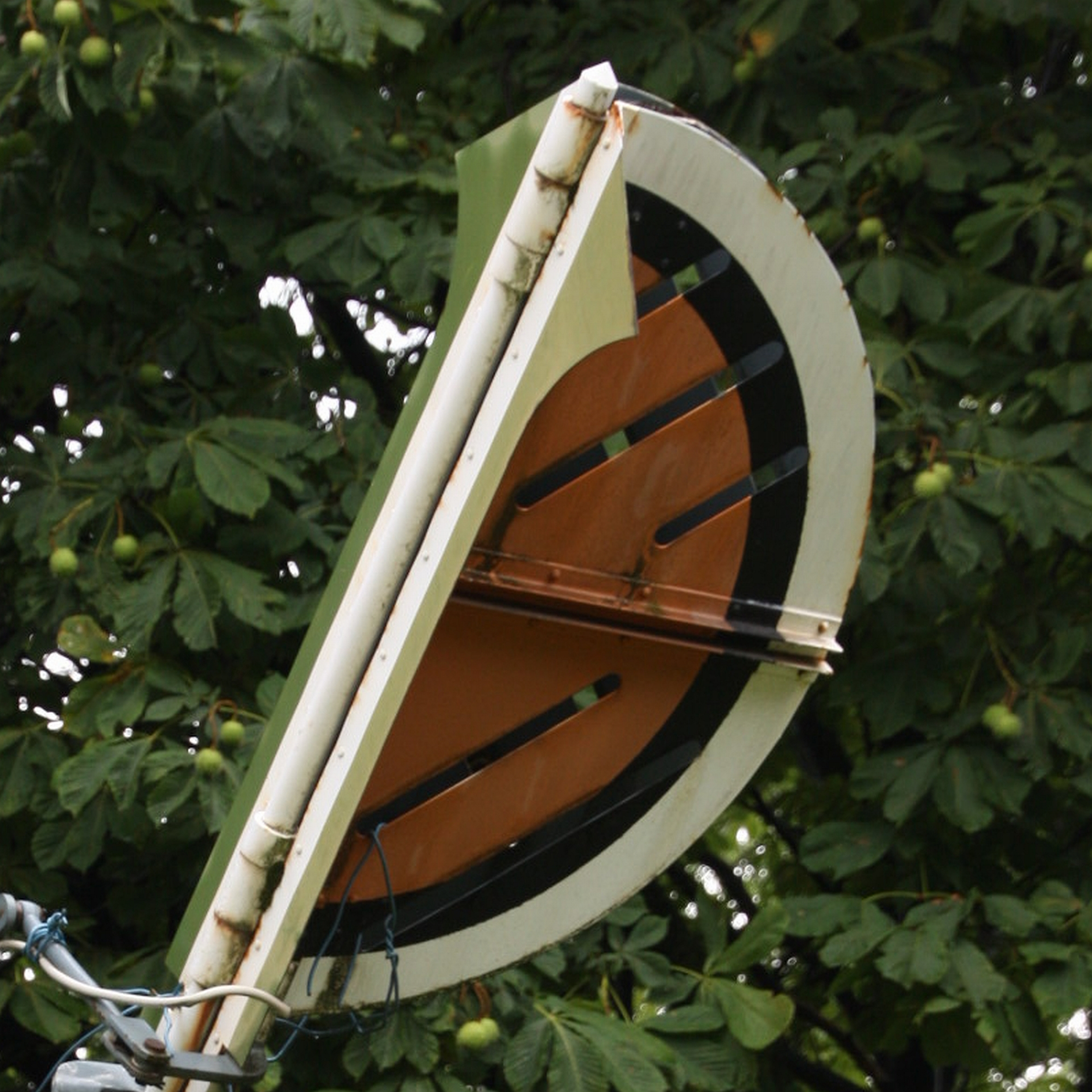
The disc of the Bavarian distant signal in the clear (Fahrt frei erwarten) aspect

In the territory covered by the old Bavarian state railways and even after the introduction of standardisation by the Reichsbahn, the Bavarian distant signal continued to be widely used until the mid-1960s.

The illustration (right) shows a Bavarian distant signal. In the 'caution' aspect it displays a round disc. The disc had a diagonally-oriented hinge in the centre. On changing from the 'warning' aspect (Vr 0) to the 'clear' aspect (Vr 101 or 102) both halves of the disc folded to the rear, so that, in their place, a signal arm appeared pointing up and to the right. Because this movement looked like a butterfly closing its wings, the Bavarian distant signal was called the "butterfly signal" (Schmetterlingssignal). Until 1922, the disc was green with a white border and white dot in the centre; thereafter it was orange with a white border. The signal arm and signal mast were also green and white until 1922; then red and white.

An advantage of this design over the standard distant signal of the Reichsbahn was that it displayed a clearly visible signal aspect in each position. As a result, it did not need a distant signal board (Vorsignaltafel). This was hesitantly retrofitted by the Reichsbahn from 1936. Even after the Second World War, however, distant signals without signal boards could still be found in Bavaria.

Thanks to its construction, the Bavarian distant signal could also be fitted to the mast of a home semaphore signal, so that, for example, the combination of 'proceed slowly' and 'expect clear or proceed slowly' (Hp 2, Vr 102) could be displayed on the same mast using three semaphore arms. In this case, the coloured lens of the distant signal was mechanically blocked when the home signal was set to the 'stop' aspect and, sometimes, even the disc mechanism was hidden.

From 1922, the night aspects of Bavarian distant signals corresponded to the standard Vr 0 and Vr 1. Until 1922, however, a green light meant 'caution'. For the 'clear' aspect, the green lens was folded away and a white signal lamp appeared. The Bavarian distant signal was unusual in that it only knew two aspects. 'Caution' always meant "expect a stop signal". In addition, to begin with, a distant signal was only installed, if the home signal could not be seen within the train's braking distance.

== Home signal ==
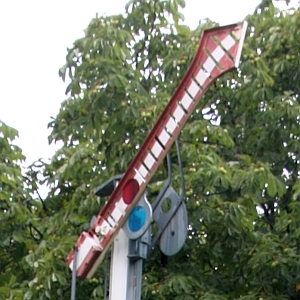
Arm of a single-armed Bavarian home signal

The main difference between Bavarian home signals and those of the Reichsbahn was the shape of the semaphore arm. On Reichsbahn signals the tip of the semaphore is circular in shape; on Bavarian signals it is diamond-shaped (see illustration).

The second semaphore arm on twin-armed semaphore signals had a slightly different shape. Instead of the being at the very end of the arm, the round disc was slightly closer to the mast, so that the end of the arm projected beyond it. The predecessor to the second arm was the 'proceed slowly' disc (Langsamfahrscheibe), which could be folded away to the side when required. Up to about 1880 this was a round, green and white disc.

There were two variants of signal arm: a slotted, lattice-like arm and a solid arm made entirely of enamelled metal. The mast was made of two steel profiles (Zores sections); metal steps being fitted to the mast so that they were parallel to the track.

Until 1922, the colours of the night signals were unusual, like those of the distant signal:

- Clear (Freie Fahrt): white light
- Proceed Slowly (Langsamfahrt): white light above a green light
- Stop (Halt): red light

In the original design the lantern lenses for the Stop aspect were placed in the centre of the signal arm.

'Proceed Slowly' (Fahrt frei) was displayed to trains using a green light (from 1876) on the signal lanterns - on multi-arm signals the uppermost lantern. From 1893 to c. 1922 a white light was used.

'Proceed slowly onto a branching track' (Fahrt frei in ein abzweigendes Gleis) was indicated on two-armed home signals from 1893 to 1922 by a white light with a green light vertically below it. From 1948 the lower, green, light was exchanged for a yellow one.

Sometimes the arms were bent back at the tips to enable the illumination by signal lanterns at night.

During the changeover between 1922 and 1936 the 'proceed slowly' aspect was indicated by two green lights. Only after that time was the green lens on the second arm replaced by a yellow/orange one.

== Rest signal ==
The 'rest signal' (Ruhesignal) on a Bavarian home signal was signalled using an additional aspect: 'rest' (Ruhe). It was used in Bavaria from 1893 to 1975. It was the last signal from the state railway era that was retained in the signalling book of the Deutsche Bundesbahn. This was a single or twin-armed semaphore signal, which took over the function of an exist signal and enhanced it with an additional signal aspect: 'rest' (Ruhe, HpRu). The term 'rest' meant that the railway vehicles were to remain on the allocated track, although shunting was permitted. If the arm was moved to its default position (Halt) the associated track was to be immediately cleared. The aspect, 'rest', was indicated by a downward-pointing semaphore arm or, at night, by a blue light. The Deutsche Reichsbahn marked the signal with an additional board with the letters Ru on it, in order to distinguish it from a normal home signal. The semaphore arm of the rest signal had the same dimensions as those of the Bavarian home signals.

For those familiar with modern railways, the sense of this signal aspect is hard to understand. During its period of use, there was often a signal box at each end of the station or there were areas of hand-operated points that were set by pointsmen. The 'rest' aspect indicated to the pointsmen and shunters that they could "do what they wanted and store what they wanted" on the track so designated. However, they could not use any tracks where the signal displayed a different aspect.

== Track blocking signal ==
The Bavarian track blocking signal (Gleissperrsignal) is the largest of all the blocking signals. The round signal lanterns displayed a round, white milk glass disc towards the train. This had a horizontal, black bar across it. Unlike the later Reichsbahn standard design, the black bar was not turned; instead the whole lantern was rotated through 90° on its pedestal, so that the side of the lantern was presented to the train. The side of the signal lantern had an almost square milk glass window. At night the lantern was lit internally.

== Literature ==
- Robert Zintl: Fahrt frei. Bayerische Signale und Stellwerke. Motorbuch Verlag, Stuttgart, 1978, ISBN 3-87943-585-5.
- Robert Zintl: Bayerische Nebenbahnen. Motorbuch–Verlag, Stuttgart, 1977, ISBN 3-87943-531-6.
- Magazin für Eisenbahnfreunde DREHSCHEIBE, Issue 162 (2002): Bayerische Formhauptsignale sind endgültig ausgerottet.
- Magazin für Eisenbahnfreunde DREHSCHEIBE, Issue 175 (2003): Signal=Raritäten=Kabinett 69: Weichensignale.
- Bernhard Ücker: Endstation 1920, Die Geschichte der Königlich Bayerischen Staatsbahn. Süddeutscher Verlag, Munich, 1972, ISBN 3-7991-5704-2.
- Stefan Carstens: Signale 2 - Signalbegriffe, Anordnung und Bauformen, Haupt- und Vorsignale, Signalverbindungen. (= MIBA-Report). 2nd edn., 2007, ISBN 978-3-89610-236-2.
- Stefan Carstens: Signale 1 - Die Entwicklung des Signalwesens vom optischen Telegraphen zum Ks-Signal. (= MIBA-Report). 2006, ISBN 3-89610-234-6.
