= COTIF =

COTIF may refer to:

- L'Alcúdia International Football Tournament, known as COTIF, an annual international youth football competition
- Convention concerning International Carriage by Rail (COTIF), a 1980 meeting and treaty that established the Intergovernmental Organisation for International Carriage by Rail
