= 2011 Baby derailment =

2011 train derailment in Baby, Piotrków County, Poland

2011 Baby Derailment
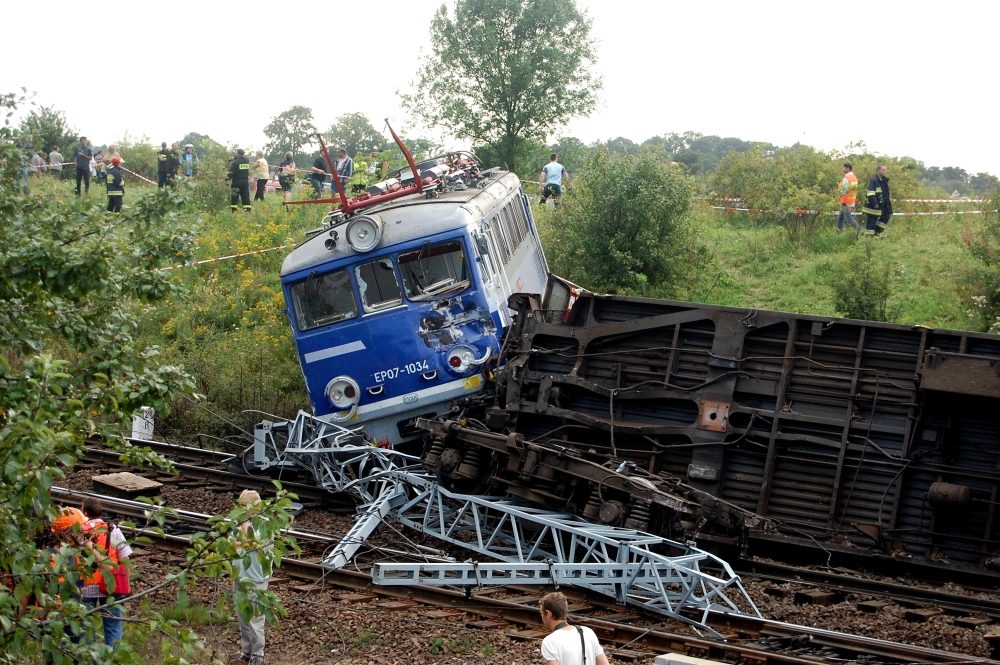

Details
- Date: 12 August 2011; 16:15 local time
- Location: Baby, Piotrków County
- Coordinates: 51°32′13″N 19°43′00″E
- Country: Poland
- Line: Warszawa Zachodnia - Katowice
- Operator: PKP Intercity
- Incident type: Derailment
- Cause: Disputed: Overspeed caused by driver (PKBWK); Signal fault (driver and Karol Trammer)

Statistics
- Trains: TLK 14101 Stanisław Wysocki, Warszawa Wschodnia - Katowice
- Passengers: 280
- Deaths: 2
- Injured: 80

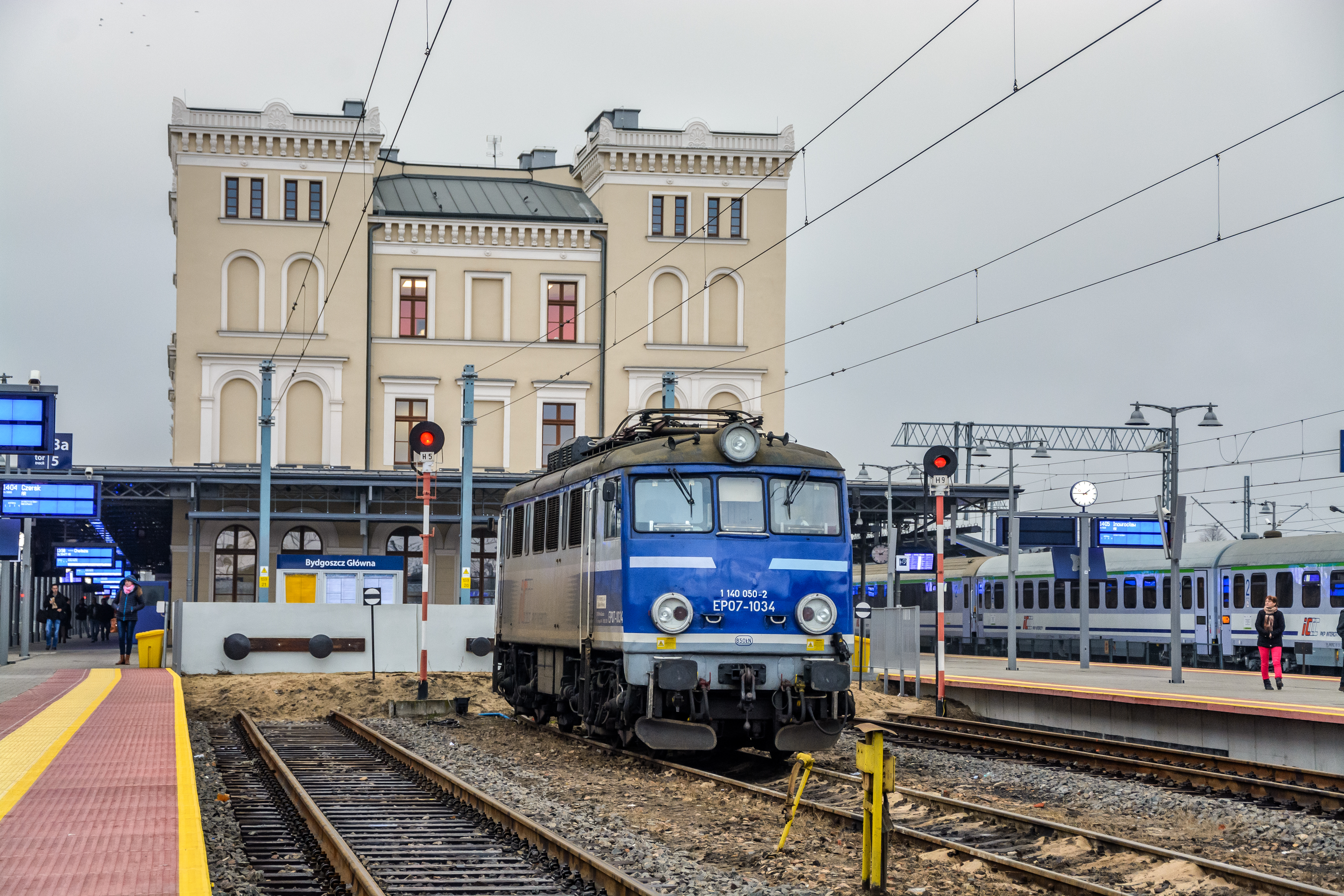
EP07-1034 locomotive, the one that derailed in Baby, 4 years after the accident in Bydgoszcz Główna.

On 12 August 2011, an express train travelling from Warsaw to Katowice in southern Poland derailed at Baby, near Piotrków Trybunalski, killing one passenger and injuring 80 others.

== Accident ==
On Friday, 12 August 2011, a PKP Intercity TLK train from Warszawa Wschodnia to Katowice derailed at Baby [ˈbabɨ], near the town of Piotrków Trybunalski. The accident happened at 16:15 local time (14:15 UTC). Initially, four passengers were reported dead, but search of the wreckage with the use of lifting equipment and rescue dogs established that only one 52-year-old man had died. A total of 81 passengers were injured, including about 20 in serious condition. The locomotive, PKP class EU07, number 1034, and all four carriages derailed. The first carriage turned over. The train was full, carrying almost 280 passengers, as the accident happened on the Friday before the long weekend of the Assumption Day holiday.

After the accident, it was reported that the train had been travelling at 118 kilometres per hour (73 mph) on a section of line where the maximum permitted speed was only 40 kilometres per hour (25 mph). The driver was placed under arrest in the hospital, and on 15 August 2011 a court placed him under detention for two months. In 2015 he was found guilty of causing the derailment and sentenced for three years and three months of prison.

== Controversy ==
In 2019, Polish railway-journalist Karol Trammer wrote, that the investigation team (PKBWK, Państwowa Komisja Badań Wypadków Kolejowych) did not pay attention to the discrepancy between what driver said after derailment, and what has been saved by the audio register in Baby signal box, asserting that driver has pleaded guilty in what he told after the accident. PKBWK would also dismiss signal fault - to which the driver has pointed during interrogation, and 18 April 2012 incident in Baby, which involved signal fault - and train dispatcher error caused by workload and safety errors, as possible causes. In such circumstances, the driver should be acquitted according to in dubio pro reo rule, which was also used by Polish court during one train crash case in the past.
