= Chinese Train Control System =

Train protection system

The Chinese Train Control System (CTCS, Chinese: 中国列车控制系统) is a train control system used on railway lines in People's Republic of China. CTCS is similar to the European Train Control System (ETCS).

It has two subsystems: ground subsystem and onboard subsystem. The ground subsystem may include balise, track circuit, radio communication network (GSM-R), and Radio Block Center (RBC). The onboard subsystem includes onboard computer and communication module.

== CTCS Levels ==
There are 5 different levels (Level 0 to Level 4). Levels 2, 3, and 4 are back-compatible with lower levels.

=== CTCS Level 0 (CTCS-0) ===
For railway lines where operational speeds are below 120 km/h (75 mph):

- Track configuration: Track circuit
- Cab configuration: CTCS Universal Cab Signalling (UCS) + Train operating service unit (TOSU/LKJ) + Driver Machine Interface (DMI).

Level 0 is used on lines with conventional trackside signalling. Train drivers follow trackside signals primarily, with cab signals as back-up. UCS receives train fixed block occupation signals from track circuits and is shown as cab signals using digital signal processes. TOSU/LKJ is used to supervise speed limits and can only advise train drivers on braking curves. The drivers are mainly responsible for maintaining train speed protection.

=== CTCS Level 1 (CTCS-1) ===
For railway lines where operational speeds are below 160 km/h (99 mph):

- Track configuration: Track circuit + Balise
- Cab configuration: Primary cab signalling + ATP + Enhanced Safety Train Operation Supervision and Recording Device (LKJ) + DMI + Recording units + Balise Transmission Module (Note: The newer source (2016) says ATP is installed on CTCS-1 while the source from the previous year (2015) does not say so.)

Balises are installed in addition to track circuits. Automatic train protection (ATP) is enabled on CTCS level 1. Drivers use cab signals as primary signals. Train circuits are responsible for detecting track occupancy and integrity. Temporary speed restrictions, train positions and track data are provided intermittently.

=== CTCS Level 2 (CTCS-2) ===
For high-speed railways where operational speeds are below 250 km/h (160 mph):

- Track configuration: Track circuit (ZPW/UM) + Balise + Lineside Electronic Unit (LEU) + Train Control Centre (TCC) + Temporary Speed Restriction Server (TSRS)
- Cab configuration: ATP + Vital Computer (VC) + Specific Transmission Module (STM, for receiving track circuit information from non-CTCS-2 systems) + BTM + DMI + Speed Detection Unit (SDU) + Recording units

The track circuit is used both for train occupation detection and movement authorization, its architecture is similar to TVM-300. Balises and track circuit serves to provide intermittent trackside information and automatic train protection (ATP) to cab equipment. Trackside signalling is not mandatory and can be replaced with cab signalling using DMI. LKJ can be equipped as redundancy on CTCS-0 lines. Minimum headways on CTCS-2 is 180 seconds.

This system is compatible with ETCS-1.

=== CTCS Level 3 (CTCS-3) ===
For high-speed railway of above 250 km/h (160 mph):

- Track configuration: Track circuit (ZPW/UM) + Balise + LEU + Radio block control (RBC)
- Cab configuration: VC + GSM-R Radio transmission unit (GSM-R RTU) + BTM + DMI + SDU + Recording units

CTCS-3 introduces GSM-R radio for bidirectional data transmission. Track circuits are used as a redundant system to CTCS-3. Train positions can be accurately calculated using balises and onboard odometers which are transmitted to Radio Block Centres (RBCs). Authorisation of train movement is created by RBCs and transmitted onto on-board cab equipment using GSM-R. Using both trackside equipment and onboard equipment, ATP can be achieved. Trackside signalling is not mandatory and can be replaced with cab signalling using DMI. It is considered to be a "quasi-moving-block" system.

This is currently in use for all of the 200–250 km/h (125–155 mph) lines on China's high-speed railway system, with a backup system of CTCS-2. CTCS-3 is equivalent to ETCS-2.

=== CTCS Level 4 (CTCS-4) (proposed) ===
- Track configuration: Radio block control (RBC)
- Cab configuration: VC + GSM-R RTU + SDU + DMI + Recording units + GPS (or other positioning systems) + Train integrity detection device

CTCS-4 would feature moving blocks, self-train-integrity-check, and the complete elimination of track circuits, which would significantly reduce the amount of conventional track signalling equipment needed. Train integrity would be completely detected entirely through CTCS-3. Data transmission would be performed on GSM-R or LTE-M. Trackside signalling is not mandatory and can be replaced with cab signalling using DMI.

Currently, Level 4 is not in use on any tracks and exists only as a conceptual system equivalent to ETCS-3. It is being developed and defined by signalling manufacturers in China.

== See also ==
- Chinese railway signalling
