= Baby, Piotrków County =

Village in Poland

Baby
- Village
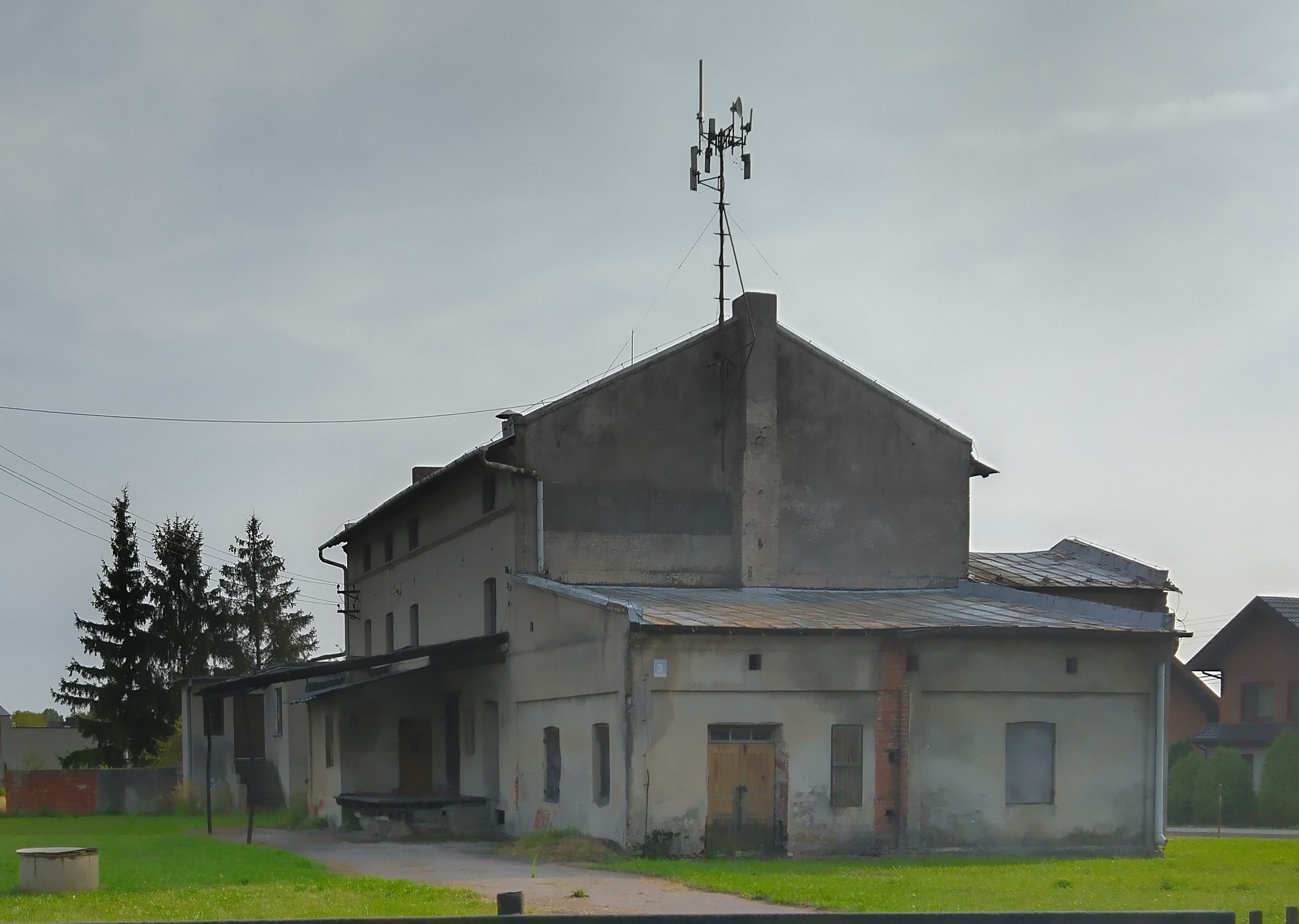

- Location within Poland
- Coordinates: 51°32′0″N 19°43′0″E
- Country: Poland
- Voivodeship: Łódź
- County: Piotrków
- Gmina: Moszczenica
- Population: 799

Baby [ˈbabɨ] is a village in the administrative district of Gmina Moszczenica, within Piotrków County, Łódź Voivodeship, in central Poland.

The village was the site of a 2011 train derailment in which one passenger was killed and 81 injured.
