= Ursus rail crash =

1990 train crash in Poland

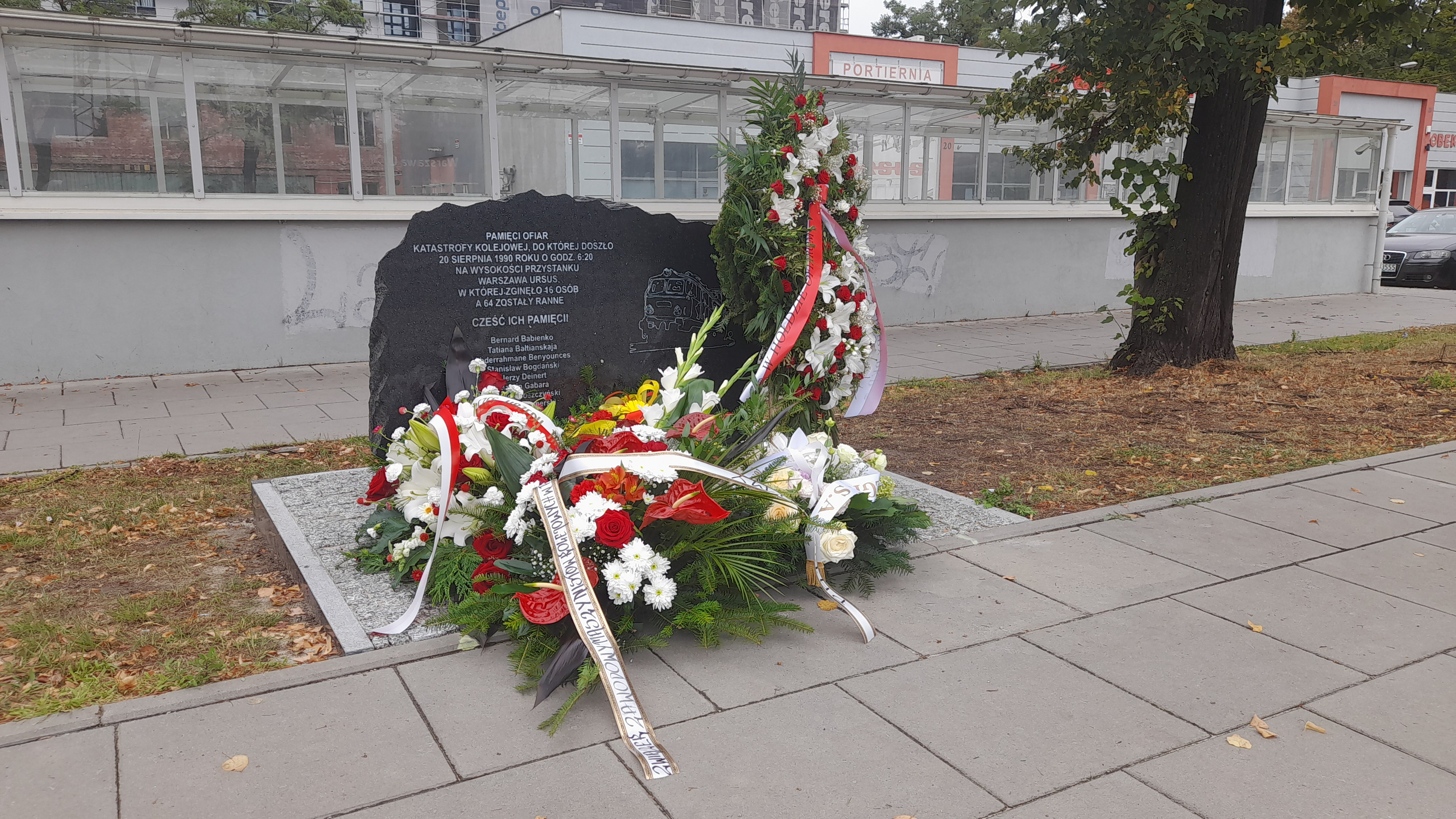
- Memorial stone dedicated to the victims, unveiled on 34th anniversary of the crash

Details
- Date: 20 August 1990; 6:20 am
- Location: Ursus, Warsaw
- Country: Poland
- Line: Warszawa Zachodnia - Katowice
- Operator: Polish State Railways
- Incident type: Rear-end collision
- Cause: Signal fault

Statistics
- Trains: InterExpress 41008 Silesia Praha hl.n. - Warszawa Wschodnia; Os 6114 Szklarska Poręba Górna - Warszawa Wschodnia
- Deaths: 16
- Injured: 64

Ursus rail crash (Polish: Katastrofa kolejowa w Ursusie) was a rear-end train collision, that occurred at 6:20 a.m. on 20 August 1990 in Warsaw neighborhood (today district) of Ursus. 16 people were killed and 64 were injured.

To date, it is the worst railway accident in Poland after 1989.

== Trains involved ==
Two passenger trains travelling to Warszawa Wschodnia were involved in the accident. The first one was Os No. 6114 from Szklarska Poręba Górna. The second one was InterExpress (IEx) 41008 Silesia from Praha hlavní nádraží, pulled by ET22-1053 locomotive; its driver was Tadeusz Mościcki.

== Accident ==
Just before 6:20 am, train Os 6114 stopped in thick fog at automatic block signal No. 94, which was located at track no. 2 on railway line no. 1, in the vicinity of Warszawa Ursus railway station. As the signal displayed was S1 Stój (Stop), the Os waited 2 minutes, before passing No. 94 and continuing with speed of 20 km/h, as the regulations of Polish State Railways permitted, in order to safely stop the train if danger was spotted by the driver. That day, 6114 was delayed - its scheduled arrival time at Warszawa Zachodnia was 6:15 am.

Behind the passenger train was InterExpress No. 41008 Silesia. It was also running late that day, with 6:04 am being its planned arrival time at Warszawa Zachodnia. Every signal passed by the train displayed S2 Jazda z największą dozwoloną prędkością (proceed at maximum speed), signal no. 94 included. However, a couple of seconds after passing signal no. 94, Tadeusz Mościcki saw the rear end of train no. 6114 through the fog. He engaged the brakes and evacuated to the middle of the locomotive.

At 6:20 am, Silesia crashed into the last carriage of 6114 with the speed of 97 km/h (60 mph), destroying it completely. Of 80 passengers travelling in it, 16 were killed, and 64 were injured.

== Investigation and trial ==
External videos
- An instructional film from the 1970s about the Polish automatic braking safety system for trains. From 1:49 to 1:54, the footage shows signal 94, which caused the crash on 20 August 1990.

The investigation done by PKP claimed that the crash was caused by Mościcki passing the signal no. 94 when it displayed S1 Stój, and that all railway signalling in the vicinity worked as intended. This was countered by the driver, who stated that every signal passed by Silesia allowed him to drive at maximum speed, and by the report of Główny Inspektor Pracy, which claimed that a signal fault has occurred. PKP opposed this, saying that there was no possibility to check what signal was displayed at that time.

Mościcki's trial started in November 1991 in Warsaw. Train drivers testified during the trial as witnesses that the signal faults were occurring very often; one of them, who was driving Express train Tatry at the day of accident, said that another signal, close to the site of crash, displayed S1 Stój, even though there was no train ahead. A local resident, who voluntarily testified during the proceedings, said that a signal located between Pruszków and Ursus changed every few seconds.

=== 1992 incident ===
On 9 April 1992, at a section of railway line no. 1 between Pruszków and Grodzisk Mazowiecki, one of the drivers stopped his train after he saw that a signal allowed him to drive at maximum speed, while the track behind it was occupied by another train. The PKP investigation said the cause of the incident was cross circuit, resulting in signal fault. Accident was avoided thanks to good visibility.

As a result of the incident, in early May the prosecutor has requested that Tadeusz Mościcki should be cleared of all charges. Both the prosecution and the defense claimed that the April incident confirmed the claim of signal fault occurring on 20 August 1990 in Ursus. Additionally, the defense claimed that the 1990 crash showed chaos present in Polish State Railways.

The regional court in Warsaw acquitted Mościcki on 5 May 1992. In the ruling, the court said there was no clear cause of the crash, due to the evidence not being sufficiently secured, and the only source of evidence being the driver's testimony.

34 years after the crash, Polish State Railways admitted that the cause of crash was signal fault.

== Commemoration ==
The efforts to commemorate the accident and the victims began in late 2022. The government of Ursus district refused to erect a memorial, explaining that none of the killed lived in Ursus, the district had no money to finance the monument, and that Polish State Railways should come forward with the initiative to commemorate the crash, as it occurred on their land. PKP SA in return claimed that it was local government who should lead the initiative.

On 20 August 2024, a memorial stone was unveiled near the site of accident, commemorating the crash and all 16 victims.

== Sources ==
- J. Reszka, "Cześć, giniemy! Największe katastrofy w powojennej Polsce", wyd. PAP, 2001
