= Organisation for Co‑operation between Railways =

Group of Members of the UIC

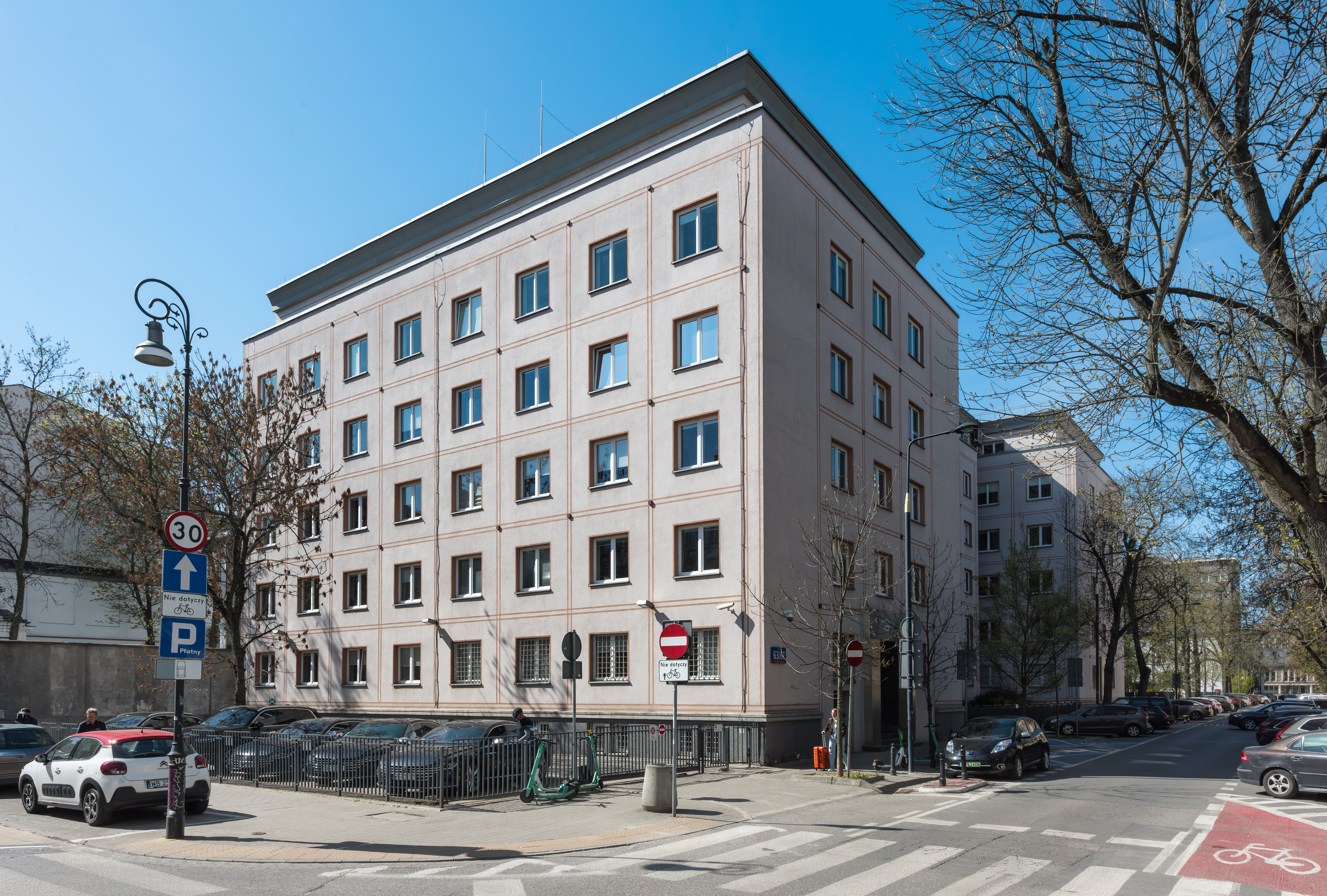
- Headquarters building
- Abbreviation: OSJD
- Formation: June 28, 1956; 70 years ago
- Headquarters: Warsaw, Poland
- Website: en.osjd.org

The Organization for Cooperation Between Railways (OSJD) (Russian: Организация сотрудничества железных дорог, ОСЖД) is an international organization founded on 28 June 1956 in Sofia, Bulgaria, at a session of a conference of government ministers in charge of rail transport from the Communist bloc and the Warsaw Pact. Its founding members were the PR Bulgaria, PR Hungary, East Germany, China, North Korea, Mongolia PR, the Soviet Union, and Czechoslovakia. Cuba joined in 1966, Iran in 1997, Afghanistan in 2014, South Korea in 2018, and most recently Laos in 2022.

As of October 2025, OSJD brings together 30 countries of Asia and Europe as full members, with 4 railway undertakings participating in the Organization as Observers, and 38 enterprises and institutions directly related to the activities of the railways enjoying the status of an OSJD Affiliated Enterprise.

The operational length of OSJD railways totals 340,000 km. In OSJD member countries – that have an aggregate land area of over 37, 500,000 square kilometers and a total population in excess of 2 billion people – rail transport annually carries an average of 4 billion passengers and 5.5 billion tons of freight.

== History ==
SMGS member states SMGS observer states

OTIF-only members OTIF and SMGS members SMGS-only members

The need to establish uniform legal and economic standards in international passenger and freight operations of rail transport led to the development, in the early 50s of the last century, of the initial drafts of foundational documents intended to support international passenger and freight operations, as follows:

- Agreement on Direct International Transport of Passengers and Luggage by Rail (the MPS), and the Service Instruction to the Agreement;
- Agreement on Direct International Transport of Goods by Rail (the MGS), and the Service Instruction to the Agreement;
- Tariff on Direct International Transport of Passengers, Luggage, and Load-Luggage by Rail;
- Uniform Transit Tariff on Transportation of Goods Across Countries Whose Railways are Parties to the Agreement on Direct International Transport of Goods by Rail;
- Rules of Shared Use of Wagons in International Traffic (PPV);
- Rules of Financial Settlements to the MPS and MGS Agreements.

These agreements, rules, and tariffs were adopted by railways of the People’s Republic of Albania, People’s Republic of Bulgaria, People’s Republic of Hungary, German Democratic Republic, People’s Republic of Poland, Socialist Republic of Romania, Union of Soviet Socialist Republics, and the Czechoslovak Socialist Republic, and went into effect on 1 November 1951.

Follow-on meetings of railways that were Parties to the Agreements took place in Moscow in 1953 and in Berlin in 1955. The meetings radically revised the texts of the agreements, tariffs, and rules mentioned above, renaming the Agreements SMGS (transport of goods) and SMPS (transport of passengers), with the number of Parties to both Agreements increasing significantly.

Maintenance of the MPS and MGS (the SMPS and SMGS later on) was assigned to the Polish State Railways that set up an MPS-MGS Administrative Bureau to perform the function.

As time went by, cooperation between railways expanded and strengthened. Volumes of passenger and freight traffic kept growing, requiring collaborative efforts in other fields related to railways, such as technology, research and development, and economics.

The need to build up collaboration between railway companies in research and development, and to grow international transportation by rail brought to life novel organizational forms intended to support such continued growth. New organizational structures had to be created to support cooperation in the railway industry.

Thus, a Ministerial Conference was held in Sofia, Bulgaria, on 23–28 June 1956, attended by ministers in charge of rail transport. The Conference made a unanimous decision to set up the Organization for Cooperation Between Railways (OSJD). That meeting went into the annals of the OSJD as the first session of the OSJD Ministerial Conference. The session addressed issues related to the deepening of coordination and cooperation between railway companies that are Parties to the SMPS and SMGS Agreements, approved the Foundational Document of the Organization for Cooperation Between Railways, and instructed the Administrative Bureau to draft the Rules of Procedure for the OSJD Ministerial Conference and the Terms of Reference for the OSJD Committee, the Organization’s executive body.

== Member countries ==
- 1956 – founding countries – Albania, Bulgaria, GDR, China, PDRK, Mongolia, Poland, Romania, USSR, Czechoslovakia, Hungary, Vietnam
- 1966 – Cuba
- 1990 – German Democratic Republic ceases to be an OSJD member country
- 1992 – Russia as the legal successor of the USSR; Belarus, Latvia, Lithuania, Moldova, Ukraine, Estonia
- 1993 – Czechoslovakia is succeeded by the Czech Republic and Slovakia, Georgia, Azerbaijan, Kazakhstan, Uzbekistan
- 1994 – Turkmenistan
- 1995 – Kyrgyzstan, Tajikistan
- 1997 – Iran
- 2014 – Afghanistan
- 2018 – Republic of Korea
- 2022 – Lao People's Democratic Republic

== Mission and objectives ==
=== Europe-Asia freight operations ===
The OSJD pursues the following key lines of activity:

- develop and improve international transportation by rail, primarily between Asia and Europe, including combined transport operations;
- work out well-coordinated transport policies in international transport by rail, develop strategies for the railway industry and the OSJD as an organization;
- improve International Transport Law, administer the Agreement on International Transportation of Passengers by Rail (the SMPS), Agreement on International Transportation of Goods by Rail (the SMGS), and other legal instruments associated with international transport by rail;
- collaborate to solve problems associated with such aspects of rail transport as economics, information technologies, research and development, and environmental;
- design and develop measures to improve the competitive standing of rail transport relative to other modes of transport;
- cooperate in operational matters in rail transport and in technical challenges related to further development of international rail transport;
- collaborate with international organizations involved in rail transport, including combined transport operations.

== Governance ==
The Ministerial Conference is OSJD’s supreme governing body. The Ministerial Conference reviews any and all matters related to OSJD work, and makes decisions on such matters on the level of governments paying due heed to proposals made by the Conference of General Directors (Authorized Representatives) of OSJD Railways.

The Conference of General Directors (Authorized Representatives) of OSJD Railways (the CGD) is the body of governance that operates at the level of OSJD railway companies. The Conference of General Directors decides and organizes the work on matters within the purview of railway companies and railway undertakings.

Within their respective remits, the Ministerial Conference and the Conference of General Directors make decisions on the operation of the OSJD and its executive body the OSJD Committee, including on setting up the Organization’s working and other bodies, on the tasks and work programmes of the working bodies.

The OSJD as an organization is unique in that it provides a single platform of cooperation for both governmental executive authorities in charge of rail transport and economic entities, i.e. railway companies. This way, the platform brings together a whole range of entities involved in both lawmaking and the application of law.

== Corridors ==
Thirteen transport corridors operate within the OSJD system. Geographically, they string together almost all OSJD member countries from East to West and from North to South (see Figure 1). The foundations of the corridors were laid in 1996 when the OSJD defined 13 main railway routes between Asia and Europe based on the amounts of goods carried between countries of the two continents. Between 1996 and 2001, the Organization carried out an analysis of geographical, technical, and operational metrics and equipment of the 13 corridors, collected data on the infrastructure and border-crossing procedures, and probed for ways to improve the existing goods transportation technologies. As a result of that work, comprehensive measures were developed to improve the organization and administration of international transport operations on the transport corridors connecting Asia and Europe. Interested countries signed a Memorandum of Understanding aimed at improving the corridors, which Memorandum served as the framework for coordinated efforts by the governments to reconfigure and upgrade relevant railway lines.

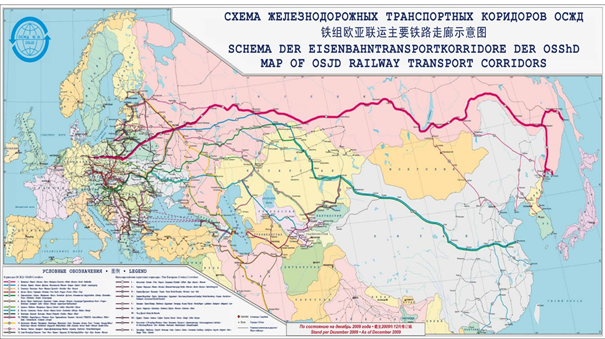

To ensure that each of the corridors functions at the best of its efficiency, Memorandums of Cooperation were signed for each corridor covering such aspects as equipment, operation, and commercial matters. Continued improvement of the corridors is supported by Comprehensive Plans for Improvement and Development that are based on regularly updated Equipment and Operations Datasheets.

== Committee ==
The Committee of the Organization for Cooperation Between Railways is the Organization’s executive body. It is also the only OSJD body that operates continuously. The Committee is made up of experts delegated to the Committee by OSJD members. The Committee’s organization chart is designed to support its functions and has the following structure:

Committee of the Organisation for Cooperation between Railways
Committee Management	Chairman; Deputy Chairmen; Secretary
Working staff of the Ministerial Conference	I Commission on Transport Policy and Development Strategy; II Committee on Transport Law
Working staff of the Conference of General Directors	III Commission on Freight Transport; IV Commission on Passenger Transport; V Commission on Infrastructure and Rolling Stock; Permanent Working Group (PWG) on Coding and Information Technologies; Permanent Working Group (PWG) on Finance and Accounting

To address specific tasks, ad hoc working groups are set up as well as joint working groups with other international organizations.

The OSJD Committee is headquartered in Warsaw, Poland.

== Committee chairman ==
- 1957–1965 – Henryk Drążkiewicz
- 1976–1985 – Stefan Batkowski
- 1985–1990 – Ryszard Stawrowski
- 1990–1998 – Andrzej Golaszewski
- 1998– 2020 – Tadeusz Szozda
- since 2020 – Mirosław Antonowicz

== See also ==
- China railway signalling
- Polish railway signalling
- German railway signalling

== Similar organisations ==
- Association of American Railroads (AAR), an industry trade group representing the railroads of North America
- International Union of Railways (UIC)
- International Association of Public Transport (UITP), promotes passenger transport especially in cities
- Intergovernmental Organisation for International Carriage by Rail (OTIF)
- African Union of Railways (AUR)
