= Chinese railway signalling =

Railway signal in China

Railway signals in China are based on OSShD signals used by 25 countries of the former USSR, eastern Europe and adjacent countries. There are four observer countries.

== Overview ==
Railway signals in China:

=== Semaphore ===
Semaphore signals based somewhat on British practice. Use Red and White home signals, and Yellow and Black distant signals.

Apart from Red=Halt and single G=Clear, the lights of a semaphore signal at night do not match their colour light equivalents. There also more colour light aspects than semaphore aspects.

=== Colourlight ===
Colour lights: single green means full speed on straight, red means stop, with remainder meaning something in between.

In China, double green is a more restrictive aspect than single green. If one of the green lamps fails, a less restrictive aspect is displayed which is potentially dangerous. Because of that lamp proving is necessary.

== Standards exported ==
China is building or has built new standard gauge railways in Africa, and these are being built to Chinese standards, which in turn apply the standards of OSShD and other companies and businesses.

- Ethiopia & Djibouti
- Kenya
- Tanzania (influencing)
- Nigeria

== Other countries ==
- Organization for Cooperation of Railways

== See also ==
- China Railway Signal & Communication, developer of the Chinese Train Control System.
