= Railway signals in Germany =

Railway signals in Germany are regulated by the Eisenbahn-Signalordnung (ESO, railway signalling rules). There are several signalling systems in use, including the traditional H/V (Hauptsignal/Vorsignal) system.

== History ==
=== Reichsbahn ===
Originally, the railway company of each German state had its own signalling system. After these companies were merged into the German Imperial Railway (Deutsche Reichsbahn), a common signalling system, the H/V system, was created based on two key types of signal. However, Bavaria was permitted to use its own designs of signal, with slightly different meanings, as part of the national scheme for many years thereafter.

Main signals (German: Hauptsignale) allowed the train to proceed or not. These signals were semaphores, whose arms had a circle on their right-hand end, and were painted white with red edges (occasionally the colours were reversed). There would be at least one arm, which meant "stop" when aligned horizontally and "proceed" when inclined upwards at 45 degrees. Up to two additional arms could be mounted below for different routes. They were inclined at 45 degrees upwards when a diverging route was to be taken, and aligned vertically when the main route was set. At night, a horizontal arm showed a red light, a diagonal arm showed a green and a vertical arm showed none.

Route signalling was changed circa 1930 to speed signalling. On a double armed-signal, one horizontal arm meant "stop" (aspect Hp 0), one inclined arm meant "proceed at line speed" (Hp 1) and two inclined arms meant "proceed at reduced speed" (Hp 2 – usually 40 km/h). Third arms were removed; in 1948, the green light of the lower arm was changed to yellow. This system is still in use today.

There were also distant signals (German: Vorsignale) to advise the driver as to what aspect the next main signal showed, so that they could slow or stop their train in time if necessary. Unlike in British practice, every main signal had its own distant; and main signal-distant signal pairs were often worked from a single signal lever. German distant signals took the form of a yellow circular board with a black edge. If the board was visible, it meant that the main signal was at "danger". To indicate that the main signal was showing "clear", the board was flipped horizontally through 90 degrees so as to be practically invisible. If the main signal to which the distant applied was a double-armed one, then a yellow arm, bordered black, was mounted on the post below the disc. If the main signal showed "proceed at reduced speed", then as well as showing the disc, the arm was inclined at 45 degrees. At night, distant signals showed two lights, one diagonally left below the other. Reading downwards, green-green meant "expect clear" (Vr 1), yellow-yellow meant "expect stop" (Vr 0), and green-yellow meant "expect clear at reduced speed" (Vr 2).

The first colour-light signals had come into use, but were not widespread when the country was divided in 1949. These signals simply showed the night aspects of the semaphore signals, and as such are not considered as a separate signalling system. Only the S-Bahn systems in Berlin and Hamburg were equipped with newly designed colour-light signals at that time, of the Sv system.

=== Post WWII ===
Two new companies were founded; the Deutsche Bundesbahn in West Germany and the Deutsche Reichsbahn in East Germany. The Reichsbahn kept the name of the old Deutsche Reichsbahn, to keep infrastructure and the right to operate trains in West Berlin. Both companies had their own regulations from then on and they continued separately until 1994 when the rail companies were reunified. Even today, the signalling systems of the two halves of the country differ, and although a new system has been created which will eventually become universal, the vast size of Germany's railway network means that different systems are likely to remain in use for many years to come. Even semaphore signals and mechanical signal boxes are still in use as of 2026, but with improved safety by using PZB and train radio.

=== West ===
Shunting signal merged into main signal; the pair on the left does not show a valid aspect, but all light bulbs that are mounted

Subsidiary signal merged into main signal; cosmetic change

The Deutsche Bundesbahn mainly kept the H/V signalling, with colour-lights directly replacing semaphore signals; nevertheless, the signals did change their design over the years. One very early change was the inclusion of shunting signals (Sh, Schutzsignale) into the main signal's head. This affected mainly exit signals. These signals show two red lights to disallow any train or shunting movements and a red-white-white combination to allow shunting movements only. Later the subsidiary signal aspects (Zs 1, Zs 7, Zs 8), which had their own head, were also merged into the main head. Therefore, several signals, whether main, (certain types of both) subsidiary or shunting, can be merged into a common rectangular head.

The signalling system didn't change much to allow Gleiswechselbetrieb (regular wrong line working - i.e. running on left-hand track instead of right-hand). Only a new aspect (Zs 6) was created to inform the driver if they were to be diverted onto the wrong line.

Several minor experiments with new signalling systems were made, but only one survived: the Augsburg - Donauwörth line, equipped with Sk-type signals. A few of these signals still exist, and the new common (West and East) Ks signalling system was developed from these.

=== East ===
The Deutsche Reichsbahn in the former GDR adopted a new colour-light signalling system from the OSShD (an international organization of railways, mainly "Eastern" ones). In East Germany, the system got the abbreviation Hl and was installed on many lines. A few older H/V colour-light signals did exist in some places where they were installed before the war or in the first years after war.

=== Reunification ===
Several signalling systems and two sets of railway regulations exist within reunified Germany. The regulations are being gradually merged to form a single set, a process still in progress. Most of the network will come under the control of centralized signal boxes; during this process complete lines generally change to the new common Ks signalling system. However, old-style signals are still installed on a few new lines for various reasons, usually if no surrounding lines have Ks-type signals. Even new semaphores are still occasionally installed, though now mainly as spares in semaphore-only areas. Currently no new signalling system is being developed; the current systems are perfectly adequate for today's operations. The next step will be a system without fixed signals, based on ETCS.

== The different signal systems ==
The signal systems H/V (in both semaphore and lights-only implementations), Hl and Ks look quite different in appearance and differ in several details, but the safety principles are very similar, so the PZB safety system (see below) is used for all of them. (Note: the systems Sk and Sv are not covered by this article yet.) Most instances of the additional signal types (like Zs, Ne) can be combined with all the signal systems, e.g.: Zs 3(v) (speed limitation) appears with H/V and Ks, but Hl uses its own speed display; Zs 1 and Zs 8 appear with all of them, but in different shape. Lines without these signal systems exist:

- high-speed lines may operate practically without visible signals (except for a fall-back) and PZB: they use Linienzugbeeinflussung (LZB) or European Train Control System (ETCS)
- secondary lines under Zugleitbetrieb may use simplified signalling down to a Ne 1/Ne 2 combination (the one shown in #Example 1), where movement authority is granted by phone/train radio communication

Historically, many signals were given (and can still be given) by hand, e.g. with a lamp or a staff, or the train drivers follow verbal or written orders. Optimization led to the installation of fixed signals, requiring less personnel and improving safety, and the use of telephones and train radio (today: GSM-R).

=== Punktförmige Zugbeeinflussung (PZB) ===
A safety system with functionality similar to PZB is mandatory for nearly every train and most railroad lines in Germany (exceptions comprise shunting, single train operation, operation with very low speed, and freight-only operations). LZB and ETCS lines may omit PZB. Segregated networks like the Berlin S-Bahn also often use different safety systems.

Normally, a main signal showing Hp 0 ('halt') is protected by an active 2000 Hz magnet of the PZB train safety system which triggers a train trip ("Zwangsbremsung"; literally forced braking) if the train passes the signal. This may be overridden by holding down the Befehlstaste ("Command" button in the cab) while passing the 2000 Hz inductor at no more than 40 km/h if a Zs 1, Zs 7, Zs 8 signal (see #Zusatzsignale) or written order instruct to do so. In addition, a signal showing Hp 0 may be preceded by an active 500 Hz PZB magnet to trigger the train's PZB computer to enforce speed limits, according to the train's braking capabilities, to ensure that the train can stop before the main signal. Starting a train against a 'halt' signal without a special order is considered a safety violation and covered by the PZB "restrictive supervision". Note: a "Lichtsperrsignal" (see #Schutzsignale) that is used for shunting can show Hp 0, but is only protected by PZB magnets if it can be the start or end of a train movement.

Distant aspects that announce 'halt' or 'proceed with low speed', like Vr 0, Vr 2, Ks 2, Hl 10 etc., are normally (except for repeaters) accompanied by an activated 1000 Hz magnet of the PZB train safety system. Passing it triggers hidden timers in the vehicle's part of the PZB system, which first checks that the driver acknowledges the distant signal, then it supervises the braking. If the acknowledgement does not occur in time or if, at any point, the system detects that the train's speed exceeds the limits of a certain braking profile, it engages full brakes and enforces a stop of the train.

== Main signal/distant signal (H/V) system ==
The most common system is the H/V (Hauptsignal/Vorsignal) system which consists of main signals and distant signals. Depending on the technology used in the signal box, these signals may be either semaphores or colour light signals. The colour lights show the same light patterns the semaphores show at night. The aspects shown here may be accompanied by Zs 2, Zs 2v, Zs 3, Zs 3v, Zs 6 (see section #Additional signals) or Lf signals (see section #Langsamfahrsignale) in order to show speed limits or the choice of track that follows. A main signal (with lights only) is marked by a Mastschild (board with a colour code) to protect in case of a signal lights failure. The location of a distant signal is marked by an Ne 2 (unless it is a repeater or it is at the location of a main signal) to prepare for the case where the signal lights fail.

=== Hp 0: Stop ===
A main signal (Hauptsignal) shows Hp 0 by a horizontal semaphore arm, one red light or two horizontal red lights. The signal requires the driver to stop in front of it. (Originally, the aspect with two red lights was called Hp 00 and had a different meaning than a single red light with regards to shunting, see #Schutzsignale, but nowadays, the meaning is the same.)

=== Vr 0: Expect stop ===
A distant signal (Vorsignal) shows Vr 0 by a yellow disc or two yellow lights (the right light is above the left light). This signal indicates that its respective main signal shows Hp 0. As the signal is placed at braking distance from the main signal, the driver needs to apply the brakes immediately to stop the train before reaching the main signal.

=== Hp 1: Proceed ===
Aspect Hp 1, indicated by one raised semaphore arm or a single green light, allows the driver to proceed at the speed indicated in their schedule.

=== Vr 1: Expect proceed ===
Vr 1 indicates that the main signal shows Hp 1. On a semaphore, the yellow disc is flipped horizontally through 90 degrees, while colour-light signals (or the semaphores at night) show two green lights with the right one above the left one.

=== Hp 2: Proceed at reduced speed ===
If both arms of the semaphore point up, or a green light is shown vertically above a yellow light, the train may proceed but at reduced speed. Unless another speed is indicated by additional signals, the train must obey a speed limit of 40 km/h, unless instructed otherwise (e.g. by an accompanying Zs 3 signal). Hp 2 indicates that the following track is free, but that the points/switches are set so as to make running over them at full speed dangerous.

=== Vr 2: Expect proceed at reduced speed ===
Vr 2 orders the driver to slow the train to 40 km/h prior to reaching the main signal showing Hp 2. A different speed limit may be indicated by additional signals.

== Hl Signals ==
Hl-signals are used only in East Germany. An Hl signal consists of up to 5 lights, arranged in an "X" shape, and (if required) a yellow and/or a green horizontal light bar:

- Upper left: Yellow, used for distant aspects
- Upper right: Green, used for distant aspects (main aspect only if signal displays main aspects only)
- Center: Red, stop signal
- Lower left: Yellow, used for main aspects (proceed at limited speed)
- Lower right: Replacement red, stop signal; used in case of central red light failure.

Not all Hl signals contain all lamps described above. A pure distant signal contains only the two upper lamps, and a pure main signal displays the main aspect plus a green light instead of a distant aspect, therefore not needing the upper yellow light.

=== Hl main aspects ===
The main aspects are displayed along with the current distant aspect (or green light if signal has no distant function). Additional light bars consist of (usually) four yellow or green lights in a horizontal row.

- Red: Stop (distant aspect not displayed)
- Yellow: Proceed at max. 40 km/h
- Yellow + yellow bar: Proceed at max. 60 km/h
- Yellow + green bar: Proceed at max. 100 km/h
- None (distant aspect only): Proceed at maximum speed

=== Hl distant aspects ===
A distant aspect (or green in case of a pure main signal) is always shown unless the main aspect is stop (red).

- Steady yellow: Expect stop
- Flashing yellow: Expect proceed at max. 40 or 60 km/h
- Flashing green: Expect proceed at max. 100 km/h
- Steady green: Expect proceed at maximum speed.

=== Examples ===
- Vmax -> 40 (60) km/h: Flashing (upper) yellow
- 100 km/h -> Stop: Steady upper yellow (distant aspect), lower yellow, and green bar (main aspect)
- 60 km/h -> 100 km/h: Flashing green, (lower) yellow, and yellow bar
- 40 km/h -> Vmax: Steady green and (lower) yellow, no bar

== Kombinationsignale ==
After the reunification 1990, a new signalling system using Kombinationsignale (English: combination signals; abbreviated as Ks) was designed to create a common system for East and West. While West Germany uses signals which simply show the night aspects of the semaphores, East Germany designed new light signals similar to those in other Eastern European countries. Since 2000, new signals have mostly been of the Ks system. There are exceptions; for example, H/V signals were installed on the light rail extension in Kassel post-2000 because the authorities wanted to avoid the risk of driver confusion on busy lines. The new Ks signals have three lights green, yellow and red, and have only three aspects. Basically, the signal meanings of the Ks signals match the ones of the H/V signals and vice versa, although the aspects may look different. The PZB and LZB technologies are used the same way as for H/V signals.

=== Hp 0 Stop ===
One red light. The Ks system uses the same aspect for "stop" as the H/V system.

=== Ks 1 Proceed at given speed, expect proceed at given speed ===
One green light. Additionally a white number above the signal (see Zs3) can reduce the speed. It shows the tenth of the speed limit from this signal. There may also be a yellow number below the signal (see Zs3v) showing the speed limit from the next signal, only shown if the speed limit at the next signal is reduced compared to the limit at the current signal. If such a yellow number is shown, the green light flashes.

=== Ks 2 Proceed at given speed but expect stop ===
One yellow light. Speed can be reduced from here as described for Ks 1.

== Additional signals ==
A number of additional signals provide additional information to the driver or modify the meaning of other signals. They are named "Zs" (German Zusatzsignal: Additional signal) plus a number. Some of the aspect names differ in East and West; those shown here are the names used in West Germany. Several signals (Zs 1, Zs 6, Zs 7 and Zs 8) were introduced to speed up operation; they replace written orders which take some time, even if transmitted by telephone or train radio (they are written down as heard, and read back, awaiting confirmation).

=== Zs1 Ersatzsignal ===
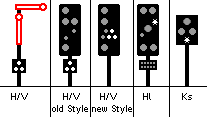
Zs1

Ersatzsignal = Subsidiary signal

Three white lights aligned as a triangle (pointing upwards), or one flashing white light.

Meaning: the train may pass the accompanying main signal (that shows 'halt' or no valid aspect) with a maximum speed of 40 km/h. Details: If there is a dark distant signal at the same place, at most this speed has to be used until the aspect of the following main signal is visible, and until that, it must be expected that the latter signal commands "halt". If the main signal is a (train station's) exit signal ("Ausfahrsignal"), this speed limit applies until the last set of points/switch has been passed by the complete train, after which regular speed is permitted. In case of entry and intermediate main signals of a train station ("Einfahrsignal"/"Zwischensignal"), the speed limit has to be obeyed until after the next main signal. If several cases apply, the lowest speed given by any of them has to be followed.

This signal may be used when a main signal fails or cannot be set to a proceed aspect (because preconditions are not met). One possibility is that one or more bulbs don't work, and the necessary aspect cannot be shown. For example, a signal which should show Hp2 (green + yellow, proceed with 40 km/h) could have a broken yellow bulb. It would therefore show Hp1 (green, proceed with maximum speed). This would be dangerous because it implies to the driver that they could run faster than is safe, so the signal must show stop instead. Another possibility is that one of the 'proving' devices (devices for proving that a section of line is safe - e.g. that a set of points/switch has moved completely). In this case, the section of track or set of points/switch affected must be checked manually to ensure that everything is safe for the passage of trains, and the signal Zs 1 would be given.

=== Zs2 Richtungsanzeiger ===
Zs 2

Richtungsanzeiger = Direction indicator

Shows one single white letter indicating the direction of the train's route. The letter is usually the initial letter of the next station or the next major station.

This signal does not give any specific command to the driver, as signalling safety devices mean that being diverted to the wrong route is not necessarily dangerous. It does, however, prove to the driver whether the route is correctly set up, and if the route is wrongly set they could ask the signaler to re-set the route before starting the train.

=== Zs2v Richtungsvoranzeiger ===
Zs2v

Richtungsvoranzeiger = Distant direction indicator

Shows one single yellow letter, telling the driver how the route is set after the next signal.

Meaning: Expect Zs2

=== Zs3 Geschwindigkeitsanzeiger ===
Zs3

Geschwindigkeitsanzeiger = Speed indicator

Shows a white number indicating one tenth of the speed in km/h allowed after this point.

Usually used in combination with main signals. Zs 3 are used for variable speed limits for different routes. Permanent speed restrictions are displayed using Lf plates.

=== Zs3v Geschwindigkeitsvoranzeiger ===
Zs3v

Geschwindigkeitsvoranzeiger = Distant speed indicator

Shows a yellow number indicating the tenth of the speed in km/h allowed past the following Zs3 signal.

Usually used in combination with distant signals.

=== Zs4/Zs5 Beschleunigungsanzeiger/Verzögerungsanzeiger (obsolete) ===
Beschleunigungsanzeiger = Acceleration display

Verzögerungsanzeiger = Delaying display

Used to indicate the train driver that they should accelerate or slow down to optimize the occupancy of the line. A train driver could slow down to avoid a signal showing "Stop" for himself, or accelerate to avoid a stop for the following train. They became obsolete when in the 1970s the first phones could be installed on trains.

=== Zs6 Gegengleisanzeiger ===
Zs6

Gegengleisanzeiger = Wrong line indicator

Indicates that the train will be driving on the wrong line (left-hand) from this signal on.

Used only on lines where wrong line working is frequent.

=== Zs7 Vorsichtsignal ===
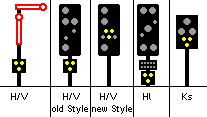
Zs7

Vorsichtsignal = Caution signal

Three yellow lights aligned as a triangle pointing down.

Meaning: Train may pass this signal but must be prepared to stop at any obstacle. The speed has to be chosen according to visibility, but must not exceed 40 km/h.

Used only in combination with main signals.

This signal is used for the same cases as Zs1. The difference is that for a Zs1 it is checked for the driver that the line is clear, whereas at a Zs7 the train driver must check for themselves that the line is clear.

=== Zs8 Gegengleisfahrt-Ersatzsignal ===
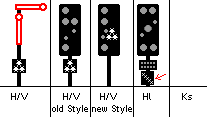
Zs8

Gegengleisfahrt-Ersatzsignal = Wrong line subsidiary signal

Three white flashing lights aligned as a triangle or a flashing diagonal light.

Indicates that a signal at danger may be passed when wrong line working is in force. If the signal guards points/switches the speed limit is 40 km/h; otherwise, the limit is 100 km/h to the next station. As with other 'wrong line operation' signals, this is only used where wrong line operation is frequent.

=== Zs10 Endesignal ===
Zs10

Endesignal = Ending Signal

This Signal indicates that any speed restrictions given by Hp2 or Zs3 end with the rear of the train passing this signal. This signal is no longer erected, but existing installations are kept.

== Langsamfahrsignale ==
Lf Signals

Langsamfahrsignale = Slow travel signal (speed limit)

There are several plates to display speed limits, of two basic types: signs showing the maximum speed and, where the speed limit drops, advance warning signs.

The Lf1, Lf4 and Lf6 plates are advance warning boards, while the Lf2, Lf5 and Lf7 announce the start of speed limits. The Lf3 plate marks the end of temporary speed limits, but the end of a permanent speed limit was not usually shown.

Changes as of 2007:

Lf4/Lf5 are obsolete and are being replaced by Lf6/Lf7;

An increase in speed limit will now always be shown by a Lf7.

== Nebensignale ==
Ne signals

Nebensignale (possible translations: auxiliary/lateral signals) are signals that do not fit in any other category; some of them give hints rather than requiring action.

=== Ne 1 Trapeztafel ===
Trapeztafel = Trapezoid board

Meaning: Stop here to await permission to proceed.

Trains must stop here to wait for visual or verbal signal to proceed. Found on lightly-used lines where telephone block operation (without signals) is in force and at double-tracked lines at the left track at the entry to a station if no other signal is installed; it effectively replaces a station's entry signal.

=== Ne2 Vorsignaltafel ===
Vorsignaltafel = Distant signal board

Used alone or in combination with a distant signal. Meaning: This is a distant signal. (It may be used stand-alone or to indicate the actual distant signal at the same place. Note that a semaphore distant signal may not show a visible aspect when showing Vr 1.)

A main signal, shunting signal or a Ne1 will be found at braking distance. Unless a distant signal, distant signal repeater or main signal is visible, the train driver treats this signal as "Vr0 or Ks2: Expect Stop".

Every distant signal is mounted with a Ne2 plate to mark their position (if this plate was not fitted, the driver would not know if they had passed the distant signal or not when showing aspect Vr1, since in this position it is practically invisible). Distant signal repeaters or distant signals mounted in combination with a main signal do not have a Ne2 plate. In rare cases, Ks distant signals have a downwards pointing yellow triangle mounted on them instead of an Ne2, which is normally used only on Hl and Ks multi-section signals in combination with white-red-white mast plates.

=== Ne3 Vorsignalbaken ===
Vorsignalbaken = Distant signal beacon

Used to announce distant signals. Posted 250m, 175m and 100m before distant signal.

Generally 3 plates are used, but up to 5 may be used at hard-to-see locations. Fewer than 3 are used if the distance from the previous main signal is too small to install them all.

=== Ne4 Schachbretttafel ===
Schachbretttafel = Checkerboardplate

Used to indicate that a main signal is not in its usual position (i.e. if the signal is further to the right than normal or if it is on the wrong side of the track to aid visibility). This plate is posted where the signal would be if conditions were normal.

=== Ne5 Haltetafel ===
Haltetafel = Stop board

Used to indicate where at the platform a passenger train should stop. It can be combined with additional signs indicating what types of trains should stop here, e.g. "240 m" for trains at most this length.

=== Ne6 Haltepunkttafel ===
Haltepunkttafel = Stopping point board

Meaning: Expect a stopping point within braking distance.

This is only used to announce halts that are not stations.

=== Ne7 Schneepflugsignal ===
Schneepflugsignal = Snowplough signal

Gives information to snowplough crews. A yellow or white 'V' shape indicates 'lower snowplough', an inverted yellow or white 'V' indicates 'raise snowplough'. These are placed to warn the crew to raise the snowplough so as to avoid hitting any obstructions at rail level, such as level crossings/grade crossings.

== Schutzsignale ==
Schutzsignale = protection signals. (This section uses the terminology for West Germany, whereas ex-DR uses different names.) These signals used to control only shunting movements, but nowadays, they apply to trains as well. Shunting movements do not leave a station whereas train movements do. These signals are sometimes combined with main signals, which is the reason why main signals sometimes have one red light and sometimes two. Historically, shunting movements were allowed to ignore main signals. They had to stop only at main signals with two red lights, because a double red light means Hp 0 (stop for train movements) and additionally Sh 0 (stop for shunting movements). When they were allowed to pass this signal, it showed a red and two white lights, still forbidding train movements (Hp 0 + Sh 1). After a change, a red signal always means stop for all movements. Therefore, only one red light is needed (a double red has the same meaning), so single red lights will be used for new installations.

Sh 0:

- as light signal: The earlier light signal Sh 0 is called Hp 0 nowadays. Originally, the light signal with the name Sh 0 had two white lights mounted horizontally. In conjunction with changing the lights to red, they received mast shields similar to main signals, serving as fall-back in case of their failure.
- as semaphore signal: A white circle with a black line horizontally across it, mounted on a black box. It means Fahrverbot (literally "movement forbidden"), and all train and shunting movements must stop short of it. These signals are still in use by mechanical signal boxes. 'Black box' indicators fixed at aspect Sh 0 are commonly found mounted on buffer stops.

Sh 1:

A white circle with a black diagonal line across it, mounted on a black box; or, two white lights aligned diagonally (sometimes with a red light as well). It means "shunting allowed". But also train drivers must check that a Lichtsperrsignal that is to be passed shows this aspect and not Hp 0.

Sh 2:

A rectangular red plate with a white border used at the end of the track or where the line is blocked, for example by engineering works. It displays a single red light by night.

== Catenary Signals/Fahrleitungssignale ==
All these signals consist of a blue diamond-shaped board with various patterns of white markings. As such, only the white markings are described in this section. As catenary signals, they apply only to electric trains.

=== El1v ===
Two horizontally-aligned square white dots, on centreline of board. This warns the driver to switch off the locomotive's main switch.

=== El1 ===
Similar to El1v but with a horizontal line under the square dots (dots do not join the line). Locomotive's main switch must be off when this board is passed.

=== El2 ===
A square U-shape. Main switch can be turned on after this board.

=== El3 ===
Two horizontal lines across the board, about one quarter and three-quarters of the way down it. Warns driver to lower the locomotive's pantograph.

=== El4 ===
One horizontal line across the centre of the board. Pantograph must be down when this board is passed.

=== El5 ===
Vertical line through the centre of the board. Pantograph may be raised after passing this board.

=== El6 ===
Concentric squares of blue and white. Indicates 'stop for vehicles with raised pantographs'. This sign is most commonly seen at the end of the catenary.

== Examples ==
=== Example 1 ===
Example 1

Entering a station (see image)

Left: Secondary line with minimum signalling

Right: Main Line with standard signalling

Example 2

=== Example 2 ===
The lower track is blocked. A train going from left to right cannot use the regular track. It must use the wrong track. The exit-signal of the left station shows Hp0 (one or two red lights: "Stop"), because there is no regular route to the wrong track. The signal shows also Zs8 (three white flashing lights: "Proceed on wrong track"). The signal cannot show Sh1 ("Shunting allowed") in this case, because the ride would end at the Ra10-plate ("Stop for shunting movements"). When approaching the next station, the train will find an Ne2-plate, which substitutes a distant signal and in this case means "Expect Stop". At the position of the entry-signal of the right station, a Ne4 plate shows that a signal is not where it is expected. Instead, the signal is mounted right of the track. This signal shows Sh1 (two white lights: "Shunting allowed"), the train may enter the station. The signal could also stand on the left side of the track, the Ne4 plate is not used then.

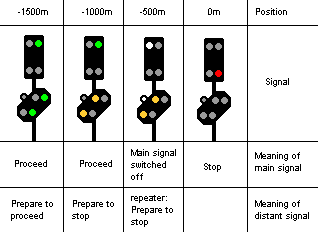
Example 3

=== Example 3 ===
This is an explanation of how Kennlichts are used with signals placed at half braking distance. Usually, trains will encounter signals such as the first one shown, which indicates Hp1/Vr1 as described in the H/V section of this article, meaning the line is clear. The first indication of a need to brake is Hp1/Vr0, which means "proceed, expect stop at braking distance". On the next signal, a Kennlicht, which means that the main signal is switched off is combined with distant signal showing Vr0 + Zusatzlicht (also a white lamp, but not to be confused with a Kennlicht), which means "expect stop before braking distance". The last one shows the expected "stop".

== Gallery ==
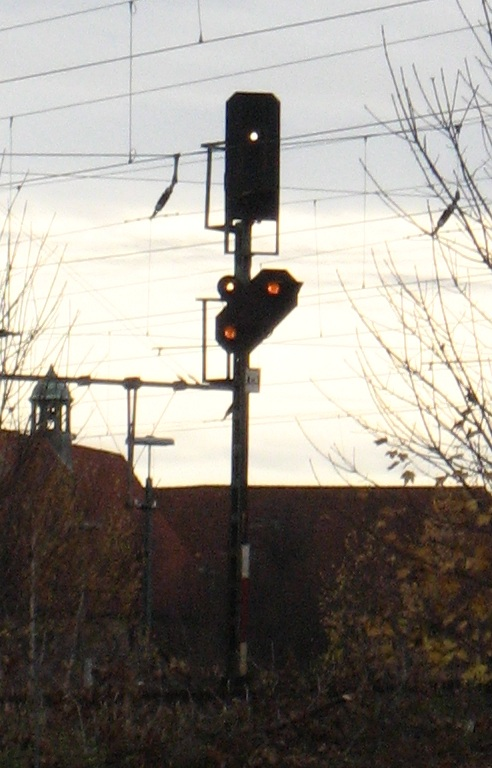
Main signal switched off (announced by "Kennlicht", the white light on top), distant signal shows "expect stop at short distance"

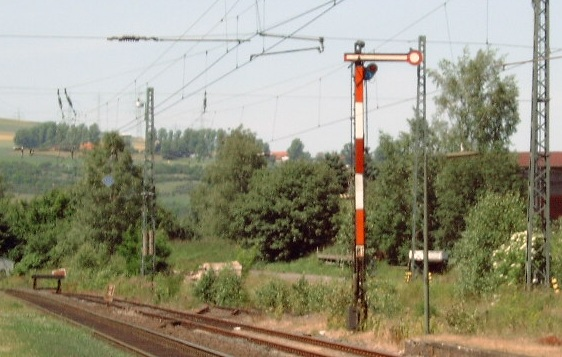
Main signal always showing Hp0; in the background an El6 plate in the catenary and an Sh2 plate at the end of the track

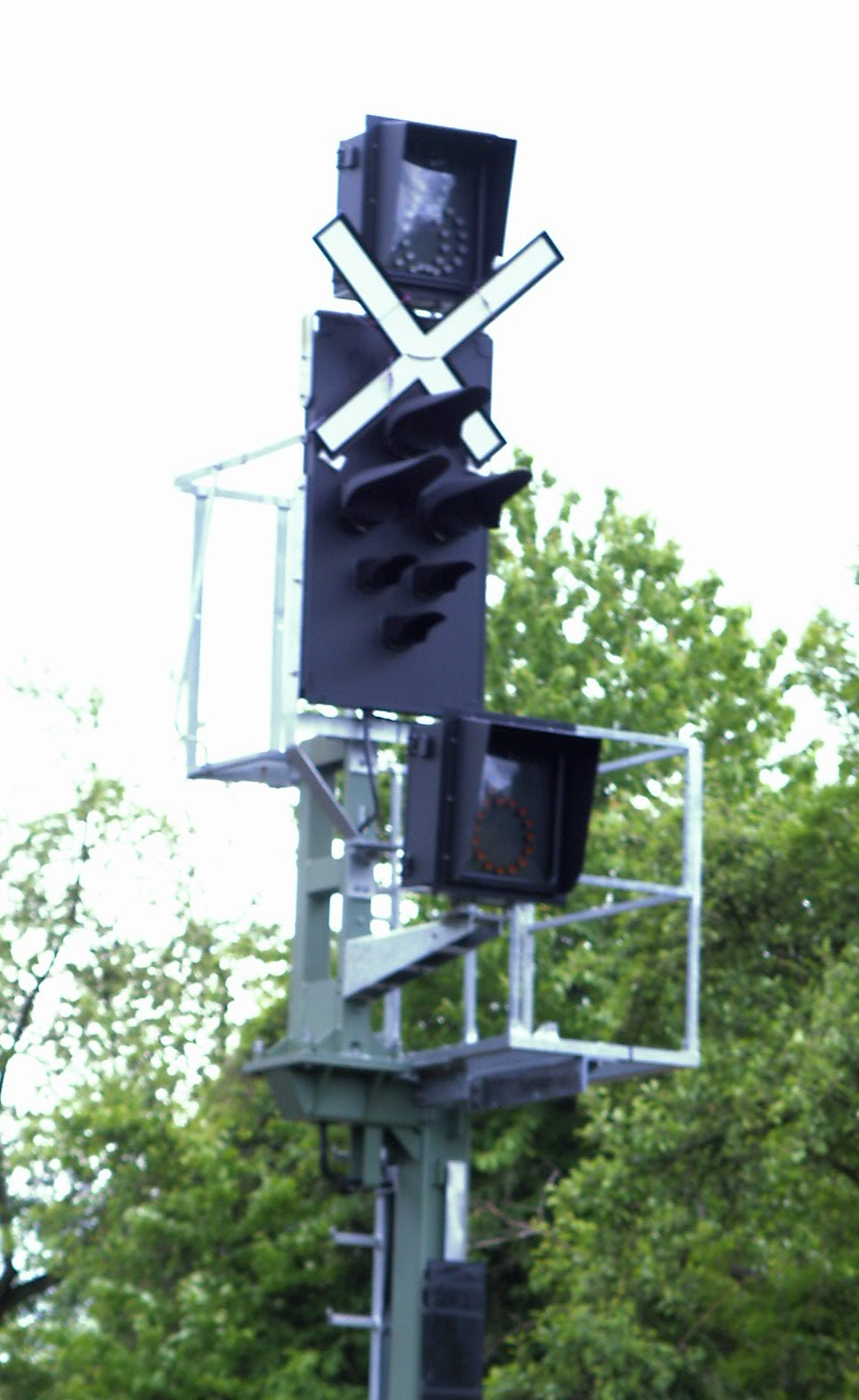
A Ks (main and distant) signal. Can additionally show Zs3, Zs3v and Zs7 (see also footnote 1)

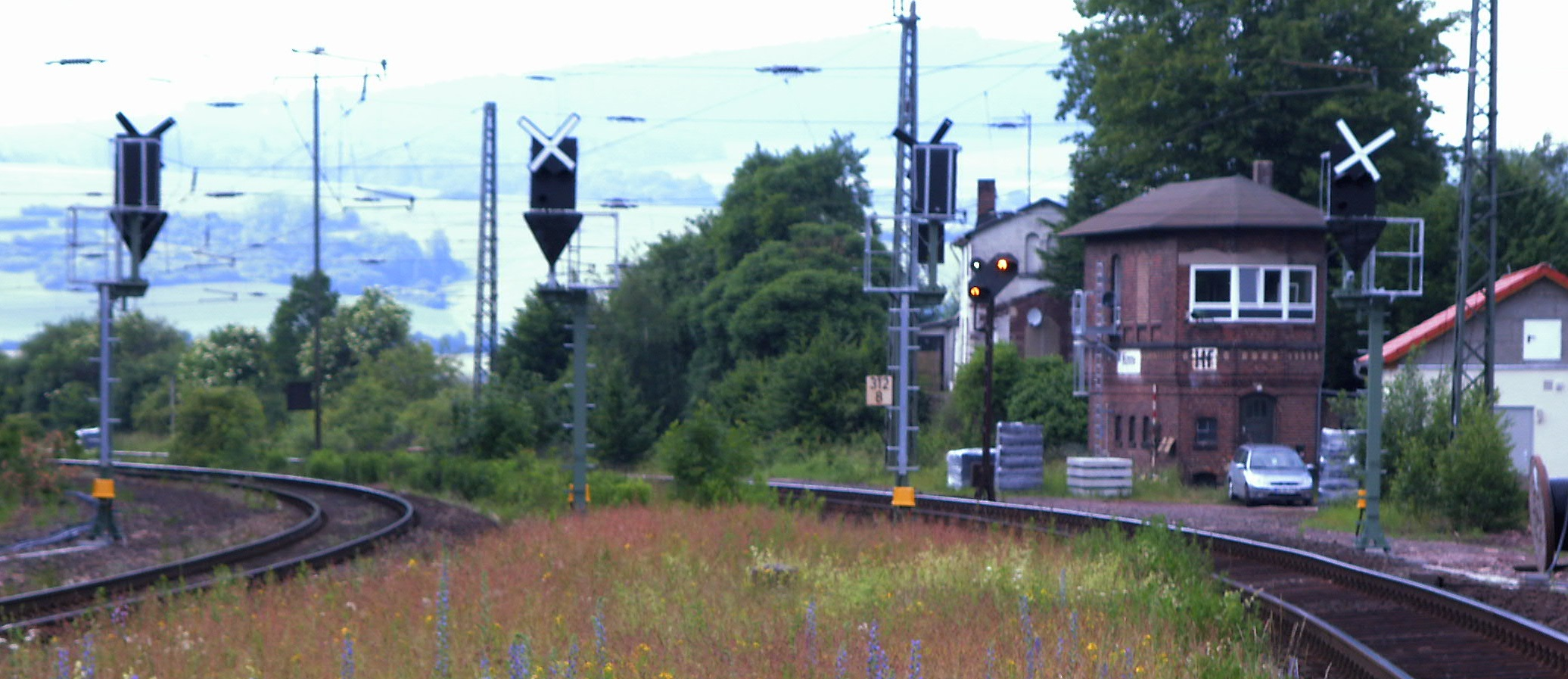
Four new Ks distant repeaters (not operative yet, see footnote 1) and one old H/V distant repeater showing "Expect Stop"

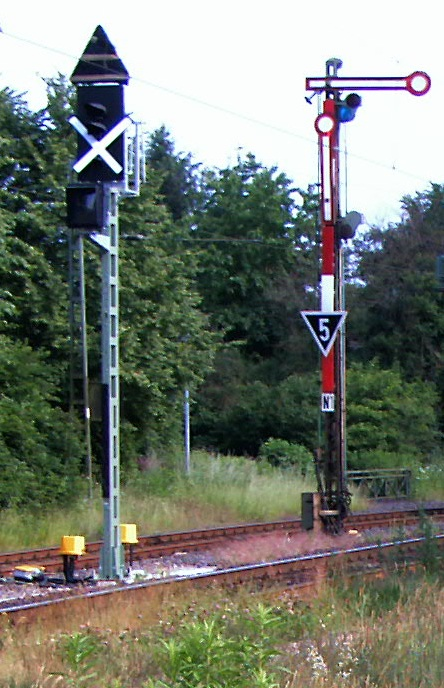
Old semaphore and new Ks signal, both able to show "Proceed with 50 km/h" and "Stop"; new signal may also show Zs1 and Zs6 (see also footnote 1)

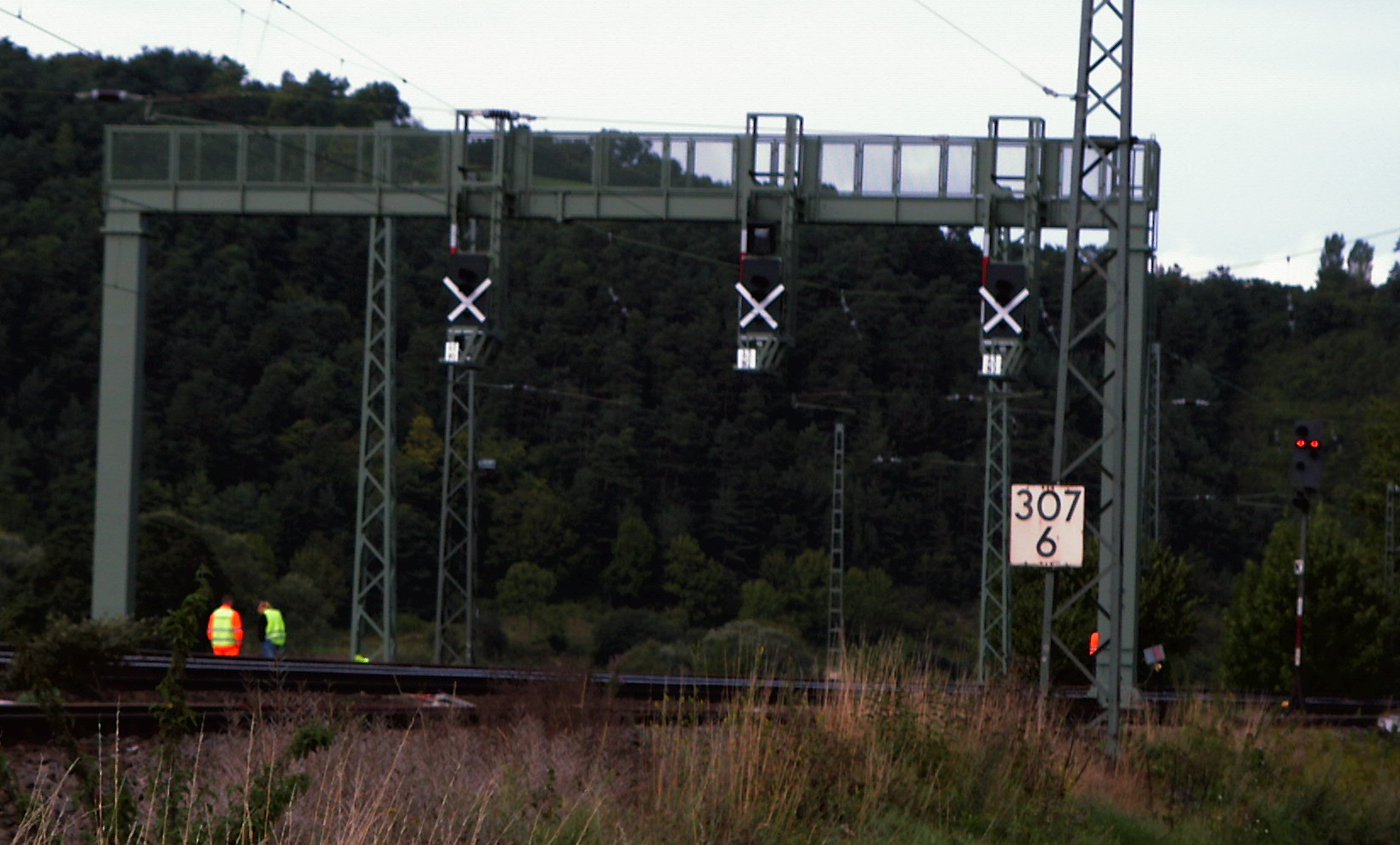
Ks signals mounted above track (see also footnote 1)

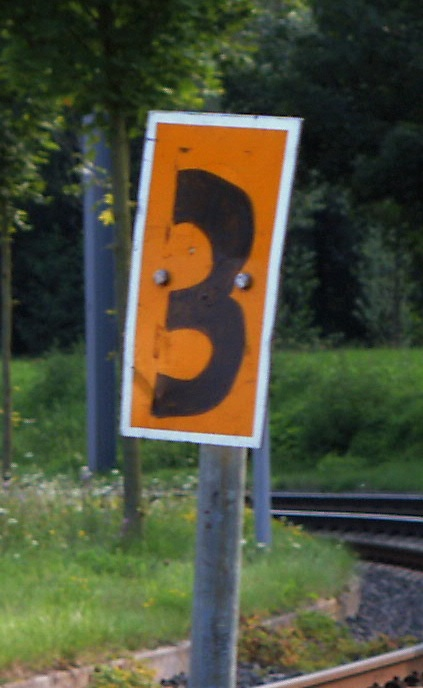
Handmade "G2a" (the tram signal with the same meaning as Lf7)

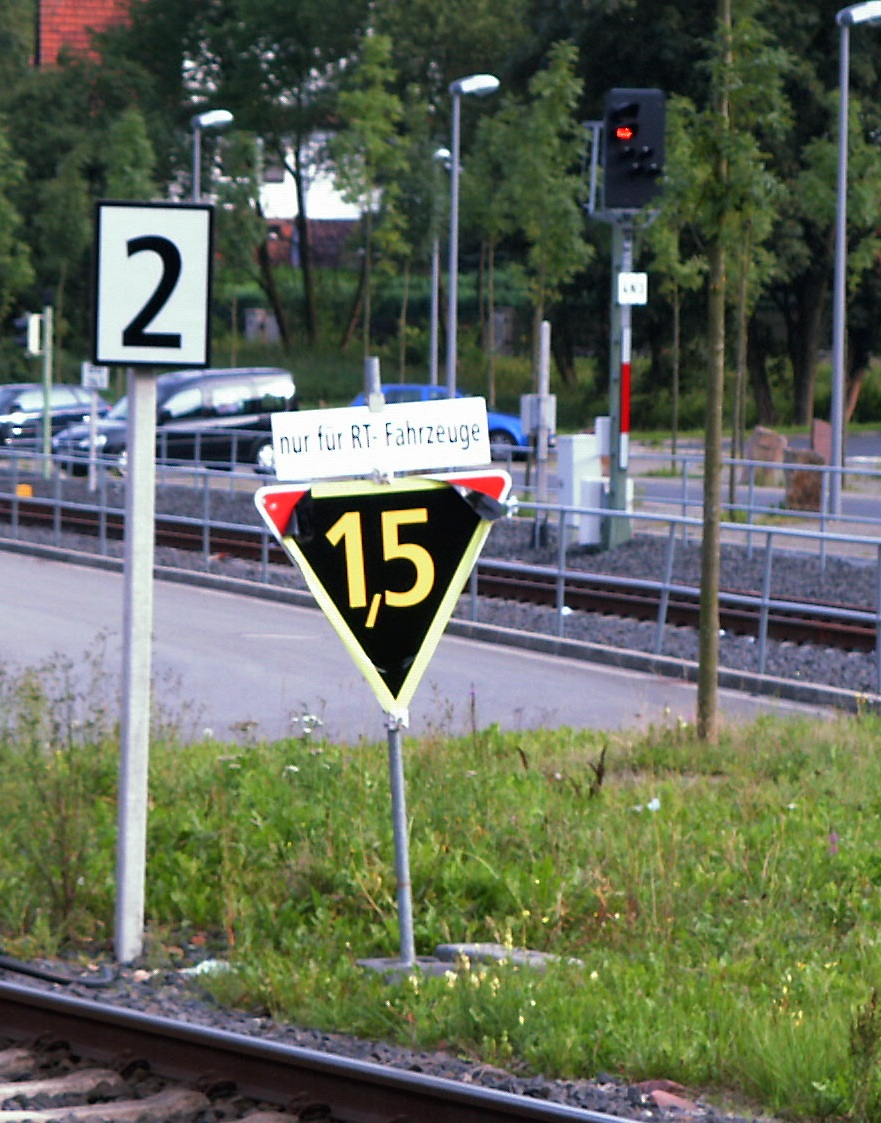
An Lf7 "Speed limit 20km/h", a handmade Zs3v "Expect speed limit 15km/h", and an H/V main signal showing Hp0 "Stop"

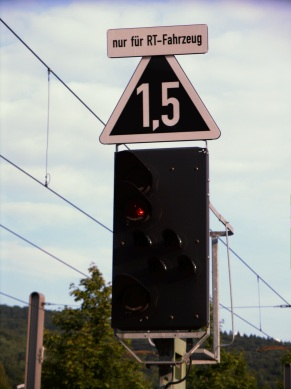
The situation beyond the last picture, speed limit still 20 km/h, except for "RT-Fahrzeuge" which are reduced to 15 km/h by the Zs3 plate mounted on top of an H/V main signal showing "Stop".

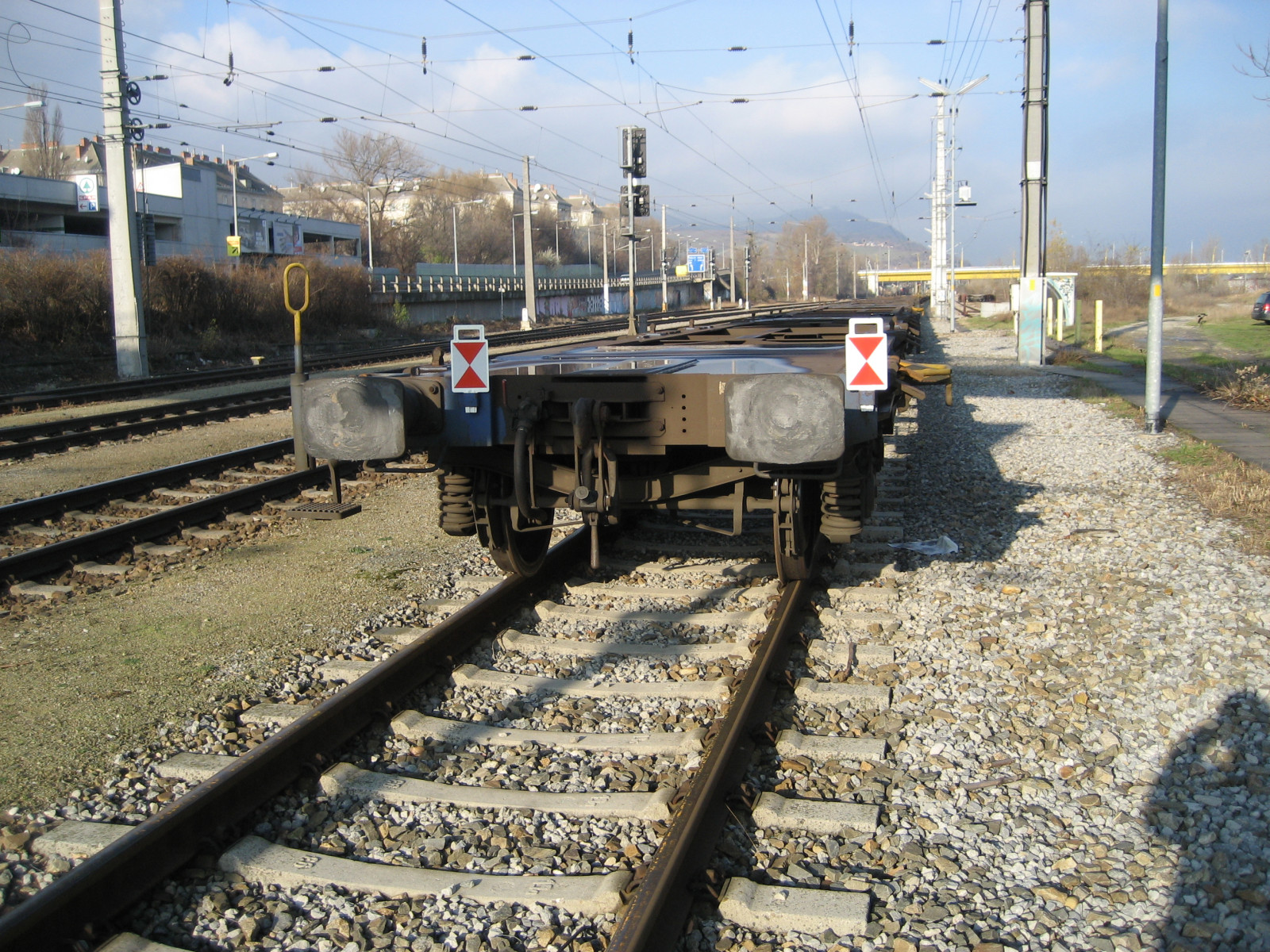
Goods wagon with German end of train signal

=== Footnotes ===
1: A white cross (with a black border) on a signal informs the driver to disregard the signal. In all the cases shown, this is due to the newly installed signals not being operative yet.

== See also ==
- Bavarian railway signals
