= Intergovernmental Organisation for International Carriage by Rail =

Intergovernmental organisation

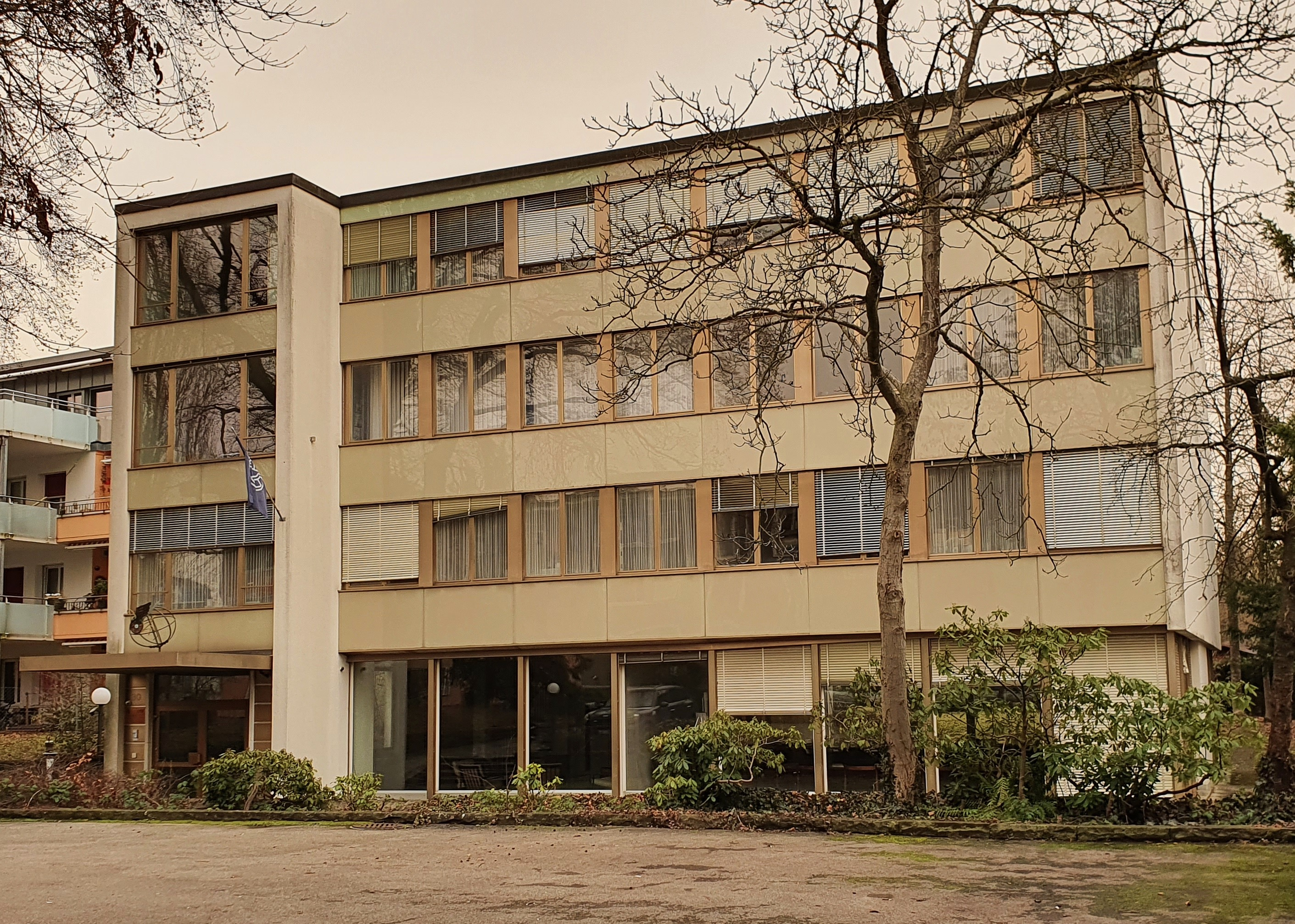
OTIF offices in Bern

The Intergovernmental Organisation for International Carriage by Rail (OTIF /ˈoʊtɪf/, from French: Organisation intergouvernementale pour les Transports Internationaux Ferroviaires; OTIF), is an intergovernmental organisation that governs international rail transport. As of 2019, 51 European, African, and Near Eastern states are members of OTIF. Alexander Kuzmenko has been the Secretary General since 2024.

OTIF deploys tools to facilitate international rail traffic and works closely together to achieve this with the International Rail Transport Committee (CIT), the United Nations Economic Commission for Europe (UNECE), the European Union Agency for Railways (ERA), the European Commission's Directorate-General for Mobility and Transport (DG MOVE), and the Organization for Cooperation of Railways (OSJD).

== History ==
OTIF was organised on 1 May 1985 pursuant to the Convention concerning International Carriage by Rail (COTIF), which was concluded in 1980. The predecessor of OTIF was the Central Office for International Carriage by Rail (OCTI), which was organised in 1893.

COTIF was modified by a Protocol signed in Vilnius on 3 June 1999. Prior to the Vilnius Protocol, the principal objective of OTIF was to develop uniform systems of law which could apply to the carriage of passengers and freight in international rail traffic. These systems of law have been in existence for decades and are known as the Uniform Rules Concerning the Contract of International Carriage of Goods by Rail (CIM) for freight/goods and the Uniform Rules concerning the Contract of International Carriage of Passengers by Rail (CIV) for passengers.

== Membership ==
As of 2019, there are 50 Member States and 1 Associate Member of OTIF plus the European Union: Afghanistan, Albania, Algeria, Austria, Armenia, Azerbaijan, Belgium, Bosnia and Herzegovina, Bulgaria, Croatia, Czech Republic, Denmark, Estonia, European Union, Finland, France, Georgia, Germany, Greece, Hungary, Iran, Iraq, Ireland, Italy, Jordan, Latvia, Lebanon, Liechtenstein, Lithuania, Luxembourg, Monaco, Montenegro, Morocco, Netherlands, North Macedonia, Norway, Pakistan, Poland, Portugal, Romania, Russia, Serbia, Slovak Republic, Slovenia, Spain, Sweden, Switzerland, Syria, Tunisia, Turkey, Ukraine and United Kingdom.

=== Suspended ===
The membership of Iraq, Lebanon and Syria have been suspended until international railway traffic with these countries is restored. Afghanistan was suspended on 24 March 2026 for not paying contributions, losing its voting rights in the organization. The suspension was announced to be in practice since 1 January 2026 until dues are paid.

=== Associates ===
Jordan has been an associate member since 1 August 2010. Associate membership limits Jordan's participation to observer status, without the right to vote.

== The headquarters and organs ==
The headquarters of OTIF are in Bern, Switzerland. Its organs are the General Assembly, the Administrative Committee as the financial and administrative supervisory body, the Revision Committee, the Committee of Experts on the Transport of Dangerous Goods, the Committee of Technical Experts and the Rail Facilitation Committee. The Secretary General provides the secretariat services. The working languages of the Organisation are English, French and German.

== Activities ==
At present, Uniform Rules created by OTIF are applicable for international carriage by rail on around 250,000 kilometres (160,000 mi) of railway lines and the complementary carriage of freight and passengers on 17,000 kilometres (11,000 mi) of shipping lines and inland waterways, as well as prior or subsequent domestic carriage by road.

== See also ==
- Organization for Cooperation of Railways
