= Zores section =

A Zores section (also: Z-section) was a railway beam section designed by French engineer, Charles Ferdinand Zores, in the second half of the 19th century for use in the supporting frames of various railway structures. They were very common in France. In other countries, such as Germany, the originally designated fer arrondi (rounded profile) became a standardised rolling mill profile for wrought iron, its shape resembling an upside down rain gutter. It was used as surfacing on steel bridges, covering the deck girders and forming the base on which gravel, concrete or plaster for the actual trackbed was laid. It was spaced 2 to 3 centimetres apart in order to improved drainage. For the same purpose, usually for smaller loads, buckled plate was used.

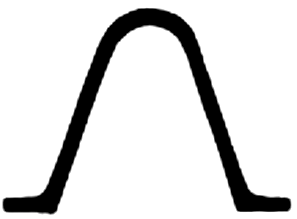
Sketch of Zorès section

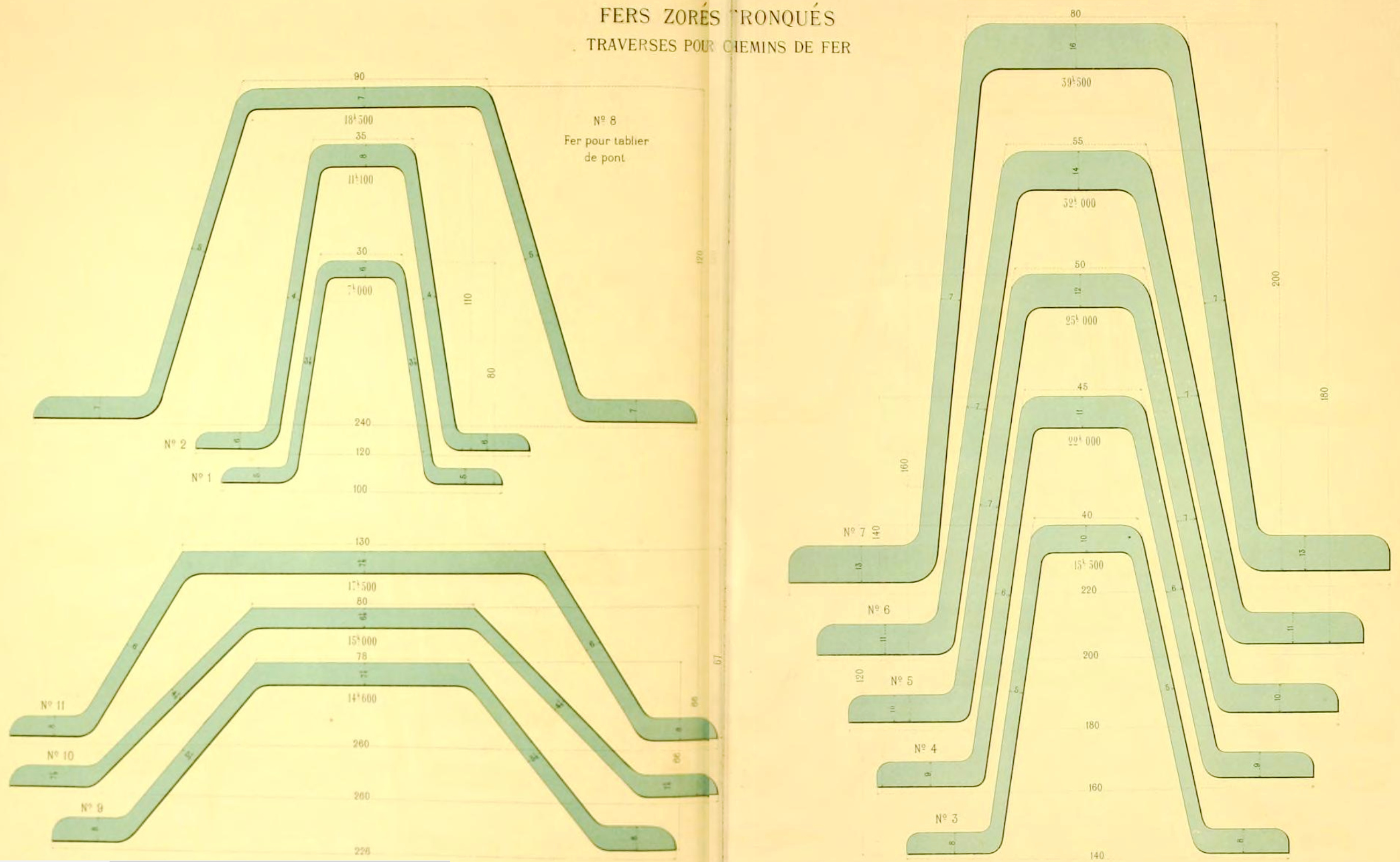
Zores beams used for steel rail track sleepers.

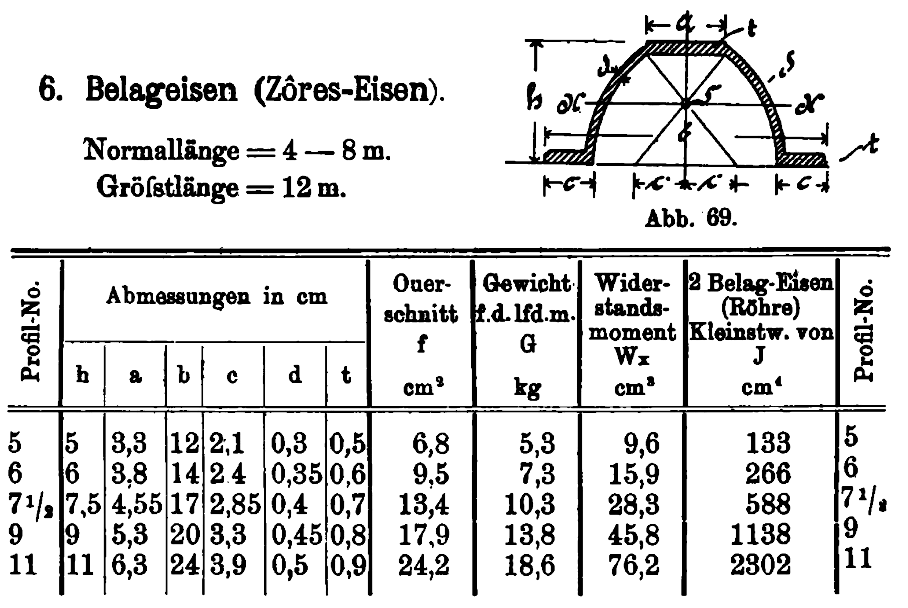
Zores sections sold in Germany
