= Polish railway signalling =

Traffic control on Polish railways

The Polish railway signalling (PKP) system provides a complex outlook of traffic situations, yet is quite easy to understand. Most signals are colour lights. On few stations remained mechanical signals, as well as old colour light signals.

== Signal categories ==
Signals can be divided into following categories:

- near and distant displays — signals (semi-automatic, automatic)
- distant-only displays
- repeater signals
- shunting signals

== Colour light signals ==
=== Semi-automatic signals ===
Semi-automatic is the most important type of signal on Polish railways. Its name reflects the fact that it switches to a red (stop) aspect automatically after a train has passed it but it must be switched back to clear by an explicit action from a signal box or dispatch centre. It is the typical signal in use at stations.

A semi-automatic signal can be recognized by its post which is painted with red and white strips. Dwarf versions have their boxes painted so.

A red (stop) aspect on a semi-automatic signal must not be passed.

As presented on this compact chart, semi-automatic signals can display both near and distant functions. Near signals either command a stop or impose a certain speed limit beginning at that signal. Distant signals tell the driver what to expect at the next signal, especially when braking is required.

Distant signal
Vmax	expect 100 km/h or 2 ABS blocks free	expect 40 or 60 km/h	expect Stop	
Vmax	100 km/h	60 km/h	40 km/h	Stop
This signal

All permitted aspects on semi-automatic signals:
S1 stop
Proceed or speed reduction order:
S2 clear, proceed at Vmax; S3 reduce speed to 100 km/h or 2 ABS blocks free S4 reduce speed to 60 or 40 km/h S5 stop at next signal
Speed limit 100 km/h:
S6 speed limit 100; will be Vmax after next signal S7 speed limit 100; will be 100 after next signal or 2 ABS blocks free S8 speed limit 100; will be 60 or 40 after next signal S9 speed limit 100; will be stop at next signal
Speed limit 60 km/h:
S10a speed limit 60 km/h; will be Vmax after next signal S11a speed limit 60 km/h; will be 100 after next signal or 2 ABS blocks free S12a speed limit 60 km/h; will be 60 or 40 after next signal S13a speed limit 60 km/h; will be stop at next signal
Speed limit 40 km/h:
S10 speed limit 40 km/h; will be Vmax after next signal S11 speed limit 40 km/h; will be 100 after next signal or 2 ABS blocks free S12 speed limit 40 km/h; will be 60 or 40 after next signal S13 speed limit 40 km/h; will be stop at next signal

==== Other speeds ====
Since 2007 the Ie-1 code which regards signalling allows other speed limits. They are indicated by a number representing the speed in tens of km/h (e.g. 9 means 90 km/h) which is lit only with a more restrictive signalling aspect, such that the displayed number lossens the regular aspect:

- a speed limit of 50 km/h is indicated by a digit 5 with aspects S10—S13
- a speed limit of 70-90 km/h is indicated by digit with aspects S10a—S13a, e.g. 90 km/h is indicated by a digit 9 with aspects S10a—S13a
- a speed limit of 110-140km/h is indicated by digit with aspects S6—S9, e.g. 120 km/h is indicated by a number 12 with aspects S6—S9

On distant signals and repeaters these other speeds are not displayed, therefore a more restrictive aspect is effectively announced.

==== Nameplates ====
Semi-automatic signals on a station are tagged with consecutive letters of Latin alphabet, or with a letter followed by a number representing the track number the signal is located on (if multiple signals use the same letter).

The nameplates also contain speed indication which appears as a superscript or a fraction. The numbers have following meaning:

- 1 this signal is followed by a switch with straight direction, Vmax is possible
- 2 this signal is followed by a switch with diverging direction
- 3 this signal is followed by a switch with diverging direction of 100 km/h
- 4 this signal is followed by a switch with diverging direction of 60 km/h

Therefore, a nameplate H ^{1}/_{2} means a signal named H that aside from S1 will also display S2-S5 aspects for straight direction and S6-S13 for diverging direction. Whereas P3 ^{2} means a signal named P3 that aside from S1 only displays S6-S13 aspects because it's followed only by diverging points.

There may also be a letter m which specifies that this signal also functions as a shunting signal (see below).

==== Subsidiary signal ====
Subsidiary Signal
Sz, the subsidiary signal (Pol. sygnał zastępczy) is a signal issued in case of malfunction. The first picture presents a typical case where the dispatcher cannot change the signal from S1. The second picture presents a case where the signal is powered down. Third picture presents a special signal where only the Sz sign can be displayed. The train must stop and wait until Sz is issued.

=== Automatic signals ===
Automatic signals are used on lines equipped with automatic block signaling. Their colour language is the same as aspects S1-S5 of semi-automatic signals. The main difference regards the S1 (red) aspect – After stopping, it can be passed but the subsequent maximum speed is limited to 20 km/h.

Automatic signals have their posts painted white (without red strips) to be easily distinguished from semi-automatic signals.

In the case of multi-track arrangements with signals located close to each other on different lines, other letters may be affixed to the numbers to distinguish signals on different tracks.

Automatic signals:
2-state ABS:
	S2 proceed S1 stop, train ahead
3-state ABS:
	S2 proceed (2 blocks free); S5 stop at next signal (1 block free); S1 stop, train ahead
4-state ABS:
	S2 proceed (>2 blocks free); S3 proceed (2 blocks free) or expect 100km/h on entry signal S5 stop at next signal (1 block free); S1 stop, train ahead
other:
S1a "Stój – absolutny zakaz wjazdu do tunelu" (eng. Stop – absolute prohibition to tunnel entry) is a special-case aspect, which forbids passing a signal displaying it. It is used to forbid entering a tunnel during fire alarm. Other aspects are displayed normally, as in 3- or 4- state ABS. (Unlit – no aspect displayed) — on a track with bidirectional ABS, only the signals for currently set direction of travel will be illuminated; signals for "the opposite direction", excluding final ABS signal acting as distant signal, will not be lit. A driver who finds himself approaching an unlit signal must stop the train and alert the dispatcher.	

W18 Sign

The final signal of an automatic block signalling section is equipped with a W18 sign and informs the driver that the next signal is a semi-automatic signal. Every final ABS signal perform a secondary role of acting as a Distant signal for the upcoming semi automatic entry signal using a similar pattern to distant-only signals, and must be lit regardless of currently set direction of travel.

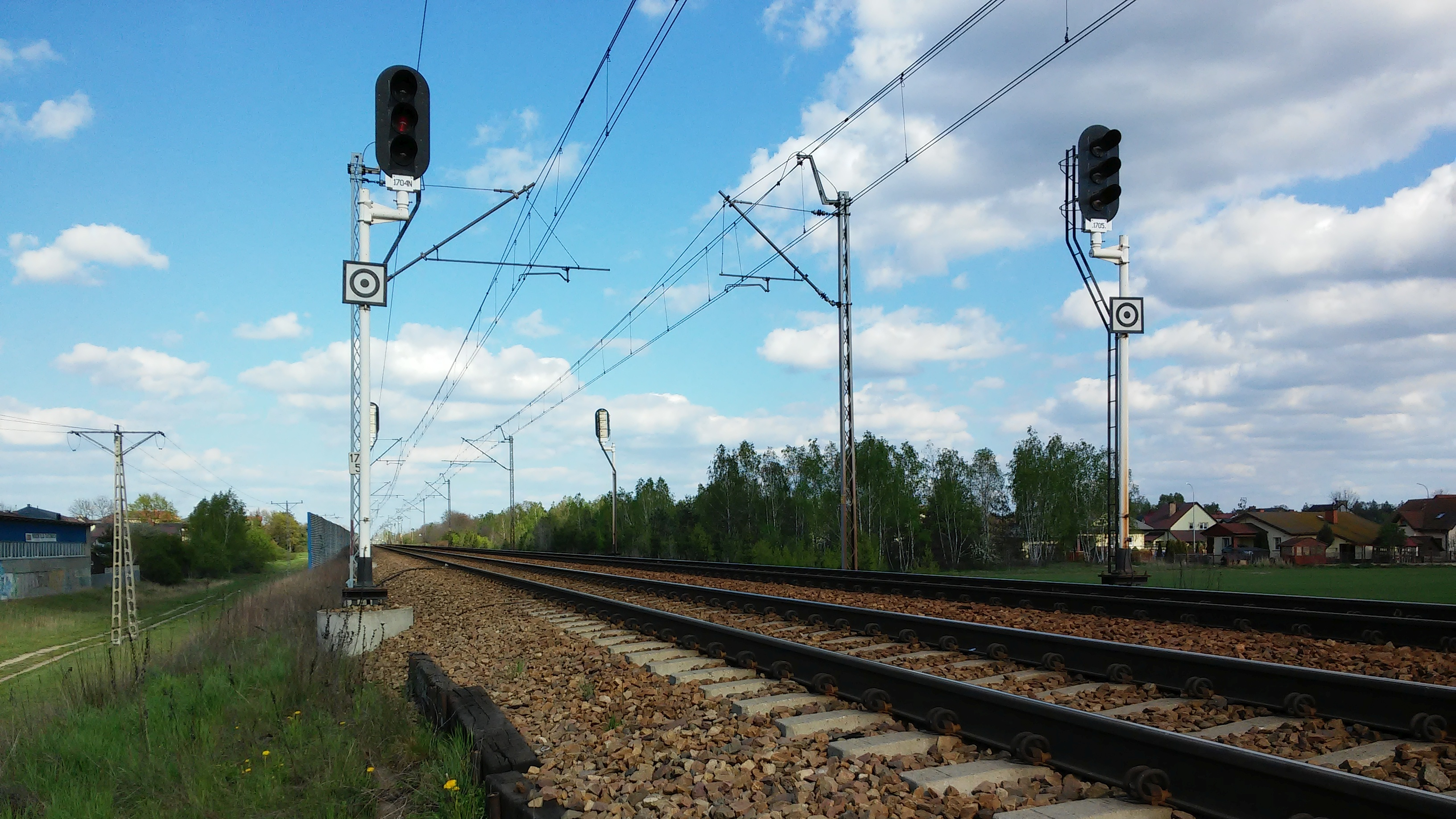
Twin ABS semaphores with W18 signs

=== Distant-only signals ===
Distant-only signal sign

Distant-only signal (Pol. tarcza ostrzegawcza literally meaning warning shield) is used on lines not equipped with ABS and lines with 2-state ABS. These signals are usually placed at braking distance from the next signal. The aspects they display are the same as signal aspects S2-S5, making them technically a signal which is just incapable of displaying a S1 (stop) aspect, however its aspects are not enforced.

Their posts are painted grey and equipped with a distant-only signal sign.

These signals are numbered with 'To' preceding the name of the signal it precedes, i.e. ToB will be the distant signal to B.

Distant-only signals:
Os1 there will be stop at the (next) signal precedes S1
Os2 there will be proceed with Vmax at the (next) signal precedes a signal with no speed restriction on its near signal: S2, S3, S4
Os3 there will be speed reduction to 100 km/h at the signal precedes a signal with a speed restriction of 100 km/h on its near signal: S6, S7, S8, S9
Os4 there will be speed reduction to 40 or 60 km/h at the signal precedes a signal with speed restriction of either 40 or 60 km/h on its near signal: S10a, S11a, S12a, S13a (60 km/h); S10, S11, S12, S13 (40 km/h)

=== Repeater signals ===
When a signal aspect is not visible from the proper distance (because of track curves for instance), a repeater signal is installed to aid drivers. Up to three repeaters may be installed if needed. A repeater signal is not a substitute for a distant-only signal.

Their posts are painted grey and equipped with plates with Roman numerals: III, II, I where the "I" stands closest to the main signal. Their colour language is identical to warning shields, except the fact they also have a continuously glowing white light, which informs that this is not a main signal but a repeater.

These signals are numbered with the Roman numeral, 'Sp', and the number of the signal it repeats. For example, the second repeater ahead of a signal G will be called SpG with an ”II” plate below it.

Repeater signal:
Sp1 there will be S1 (stop) at the signal
Sp2 there will be proceed with Vmax at the signal
Sp3 there will be speed reduction to 100 km/h at the signal
Sp4 there will be speed reduction to 40 or 60 km/h at the signal

The following table presents as an example, a station-entry signal designated "B" displaying the aspect S13 (speed limit 40 km/h, stop at the next signal) preceded with distant-only signal and three repeaters:

distant-only signal	3rd repeater	2nd repeater	1st repeater	the main signal
ToB	SpB III	SpB II	SpB I	B
braking distance				
	visibility distance			

=== Level crossing distant signal ===
Level crossing distant signals are placed within the braking distance of an automatic level crossing. The signal tells the driver whether automobile drivers are being warned about an approaching train (blinking red lights, barriers) or not. Normally, level crossing warning signals display no aspect (i.e. are unlit). They light up in the front of an approaching train, which is the first clue that the system is working correctly.

Level crossing distant signals are unrelated to other signals, therefore in case of Osp1 signal or no aspect a train must proceed at 20 km/h regardless of the higher speed allowed by last signal.

Their posts are painted black and white strips. They are numbered by the kilometer location of the level crossing they refer to.

Level crossing distant signals
Osp1 Automatic level crossing is not working properly. The front of the train must pass the crossing with its speed limited to 20 km/h and be prepared for an immediate stop.
Osp2 Automatic level crossing operating properly. Proceed at normal speed.

=== Shunting signals ===
Shunting signals (Pol. tarcza manewrowa literally manoeuver shield) are used exclusively at stations. A consist shunting on such signals must not leave the station. Shunting signals are either stand-alone or incorporated into semi-automatic signals, which include the letter "m" in their name on such occasions.

Stand-alone shunting signals have their posts painted gray, except in the case it is a part of the semi-automatic signal, which is painted with white-red stripes. Stand-alone shunting signals are numbered with 'Tm' preceding an Arabic number, and are numbered independently of other signalling or points within a station, e.g. Tm7.

Shunting signals:
Ms2 shunting allowed

== Old colour light signals ==
The colour light signals installed between 1959 and 1969 differ from the contemporary system. They are still in use at several stations. As a matter of fact they can also be used with ETCS, only the LEU unit must be reprogrammed to understand certain combinations of lights differently.

Semi-automatic signal configuration:
old	new	The old system did not use blinking lights, except the subsidiary signal, but that one was not popular at that times. The pictures to the left present old and contemporary configuration with indication which colour chambers may blink if required. There is a principle, observed then and now that two chambers of the same colour must be separated by a chamber of other colour.

Old and contemporary aspects of semi-automatic signal
old	description	contemporary
	S1 stop the same expression	S1
	S4 proceed at Vmax the same expression	S2
no equivalent for contemporary S3
	S6 reduce speed to 60 km/h different expression	S4
	S2 stop at next signal the same expression	S5
	S5 proceed at 40 km/h different expression	S10
no equivalent for contemporary S7-S9, S10-S12, S10a-S13a
	S3 proceed at 40 km/h, stop at next signal the same expression	S13

Old distant signals and repeaters
distant signal	repeater	With distant signals there is a principle that the chambers illuminating together, although of different colours, cannot be adjacent to each other. This explains why there are two chambers of orange colour next to each other. With repeaters this principle is apparently not observed.

Old and contemporary aspects of distant signals and repeaters
old	description	contemporary
	Os1/Sp1 there will be stop at the signal the same expression	
	Os2/Sp2 there will be proceed at Vmax at the signal the same expression	
	Os3/Sp3 reduce speed to 100 km/h, there will be proceed at 100 km/h at the signal different expression	

== Mechanical signals ==
Mechanical semaphore (day & night)
Sr1 stop	Sr2 clear	Sr3 clear slowly
Mechanical distant signal
Od1/Ot1 expect stop	Od2/Ot2 expect clear	Ot3 expect clear slowly
Mechanical shunting signal
M1 shunting forbidden	M2 shunting allowed	

== See also ==
- Osshd railway signalling
- Railway semaphore signal
