= Application of railway signals =

Overview of train traffic management

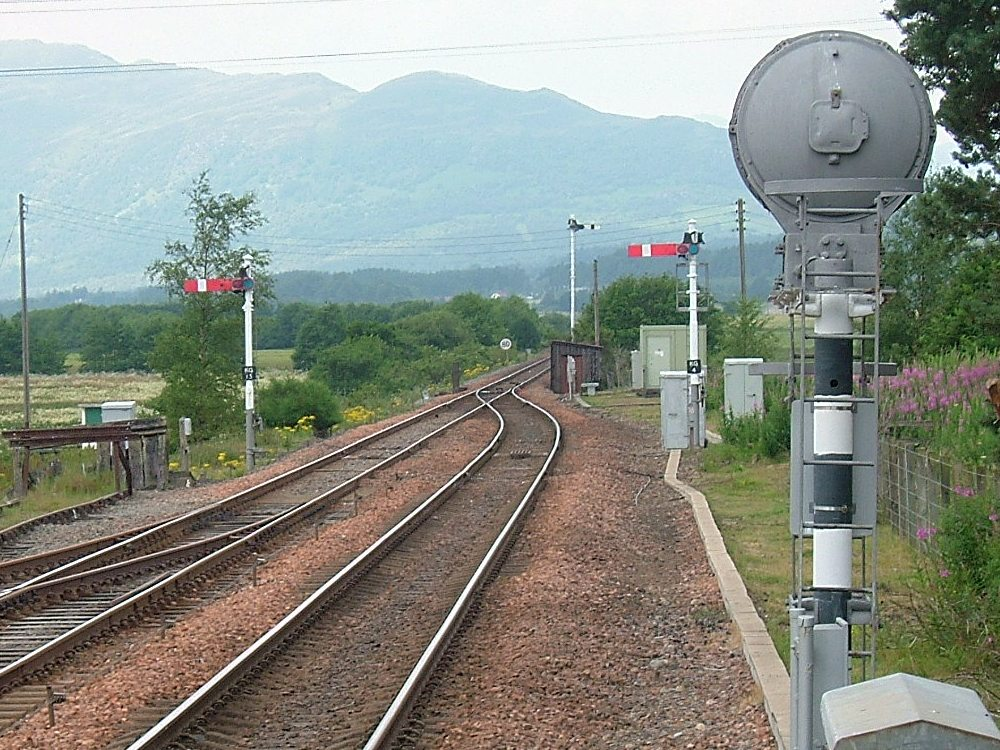
Semaphore stop signals protecting the convergence of two tracks into one

The application of railway signals on a rail layout is determined by various factors, principally the location of points of potential conflict, as well as the speed and frequency of trains and the movements they require to make.

== Non-provision of signals ==
Before discussing the application of signals, it is useful to highlight some situations where signals are not required:

- Sidings generally need not be signalled, as all movements within them are made cautiously at low speed.
- Tram lines frequently employ "running on sight" without any signals (similar to road traffic) except at junctions.
- Where movement authorities are passed to drivers exclusively by means other than fixed signals (e.g. by written or verbal authority), token, or cab signalling.

== Purpose of signals ==
Signals exist primarily to pass instructions and information to drivers of passing trains. The driver interprets the signal's indication and acts accordingly. The most important indication is 'danger', which means 'stop'. Not every signal is equipped with a 'danger' aspect.

== Protection of conflict points ==
Signals are provided where required to protect items of infrastructure where conflict may arise, including:

- Points (switches)
- Moveable bridges
- Certain types of road level crossings
- Level junctions and gauntlet track

A signal cannot display a 'proceed' aspect unless the infrastructure item(s) that it protects are in the correct position for the passage of a train or, in the case of flat junctions and gauntlet track, no other signal is cleared for a conflicting move. This is enforced by interlocking.

== Protection of following trains ==
Running lines (as distinct from sidings) are divided into sections. Under normal circumstances, only one train may occupy any section at a time. A signal is provided at the start of every section, which may only display a 'proceed' aspect when the section ahead is completely empty, at least as far as the next signal.

The length of the sections, and hence the distance between signals, determines the railway's capacity. A railway with short sections can accommodate more traffic than one with long sections.

== Signalling a layout ==
The provision of signals is dependent on the intended use of the layout and the movements that are expected to take place. It is not necessary to provide a signal for every conceivable movement that the layout physically permits. If, during perturbed working, a movement has to be made in a direction for which no signal is provided, this can be done under special instruction. The same applies during signal failure.

== Signal categories ==
=== Main signal ===
A main signal controls a train movement along a running line main line. A 'proceed' aspect on a main signal indicates that the line is clear at least as far as the next signal, giving the driver confidence to run at speed. Trains running long distances, especially passenger trains, will usually travel throughout under the authority of a succession of main signals.

=== Shunting signal ===
A shunting signal controls low speed movements where provision of a main signal is not appropriate, such as moves into sidings. Unlike main signals, a shunting signal being at clear does not necessarily imply that the line ahead is clear of vehicles. Shunting signals are often mounted at ground level and are smaller than main signals, reflecting their status.

=== Stop signal ===
A stop signal is one that is equipped to show a 'danger' aspect, which commands an approaching train to stop. Its function is to prevent conflict with other trains and to indicate that moveable infrastructure features are in the correct position. Depending on the manner in which they are used, and the nomenclature favoured by the railway administration concerned, stop signals may be further categorised as 'home signals' or 'starting signals', for example. Some stop signals are in the form of a fixed signal, generally a white board with a red solid circle. There is usually a panel underneath with instructions to the driver as to what circumstances he may pass the signal. Examples of such signals are used on lines signaled by the radio electronic token block system.

=== Distant signal ===
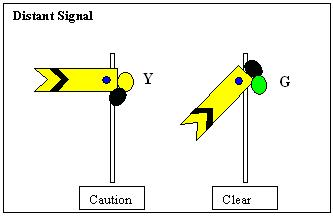
Mechanical distant signal

A distant signal is one that cannot display a 'danger' aspect. However, it is able to display a 'caution' aspect, which gives the driver advance warning that the stop signal ahead may be displaying 'danger'. The distant signal is installed at roughly full braking distance on approach to the stop signal to which it applies, taking into account the gradient, the permitted speed, and the braking performance of trains. On sighting a 'caution' aspect, the driver must prepare to stop at the signal ahead. If the distant signal shows a 'clear' aspect, the train may maintain full speed. A single signal may be equipped to function both as a stop signal and a distant signal. Some distant signals are in the form of a 'fixed distant'. That is: they only ever display a 'caution' aspect and never a 'clear' one. Such signals are usually in the form of a standard distant arm fixed in the horizontal position to the signal post. An alternate form is a picture of a horizontal distant arm painted onto a white board.

=== Permissive signal ===
The 'danger' aspect of a permissive stop signal means "stop and proceed". Drivers are permitted to pass the signal at 'danger' under their own authority, in accordance with the rules, after first coming to a stand.

=== Subsidiary signal ===
A subsidiary signal permits movements onto a portion of track that is already occupied. These are commonly used at terminal stations to permit two or more trains to enter a single platform.

== Junction signalling ==
United Kingdom Diverging route signalling - the driver must slow down and be prepared to stop at the red signal.

The driver of a train approaching a diverging junction needs to know which route the train will take, so that its speed can be regulated accordingly. A diverging route might have a significantly lower permissible speed than the main route, and if the route taken was not the one expected, it could result in derailment.

There are two methods of junction signalling. Signalling in the UK uses route signalling. Most railway systems around the world, however, use speed signalling.

Under route signalling, the driver is informed which route has been set by an illuminated Junction Indicator mounted on the signal post. The signal will display a restrictive aspect to make the driver reduce the train's speed. Once the train has slowed down to the required speed the next signal may step up to a clear aspect, but the driver must be prepared to slow down further if it does not.

Under speed signalling, the driver is not told which route the train will take, but the signal aspect informs him at what speed he may proceed. Speed signalling requires a far greater range of signal aspects than route signalling, but less dependence is placed on drivers' route knowledge.

== Bidirectional signalling ==
Many double or multiple track railways have a designated direction of travel assigned to each track. Signals will only be installed to permit traffic to flow in one direction on each line (i.e. uni-directional signalling).

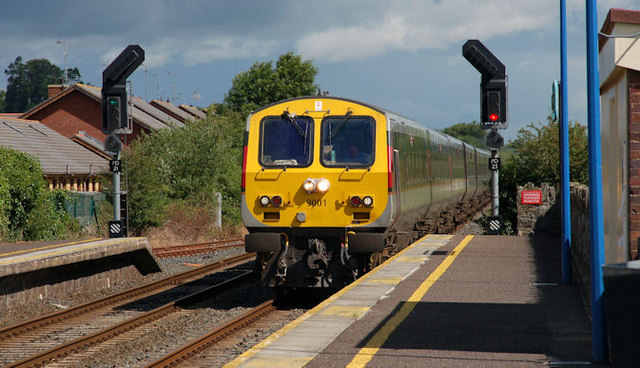
Bidirectional signalling in evidence at Poyntzpass with a passing Enterprise on NIR.

Bidirectional signalling is the provision of signalling that allows one or more tracks on a multiple track railway to be operated in either direction, whether for regular or emergency use. Bidirectional signalling intended for regular use will generally allow traffic to flow at similarly high frequency in one or other direction. If intended for emergency use, running in the opposite direction might only be possible at reduced frequency. Typically, 'reduced capacity' bidirectional signalling only provides a signalled route onto and off the other line for 'wrong' direction running, without any intermediate stop signals that would improve capacity.

Bidirectional signalling is more expensive to implement as it requires more equipment than uni-directional operation, so it is not always provided. In the absence of bidirectional signalling, 'wrong direction' movements may still be made on a uni-directional line at times of disruption, through a procedure known as single-line working.

Bidirectional signalling is easier to implement when under the control of one signal box. Before power-operated signalling became widespread, track layouts tended to be designed to avoid bidirectional arrangements as much as possible.

Single track railways must necessarily have signals for both directions.

== Signals for special purposes ==
=== Train order signal ===
Used in conjunction with the American train order system, a train order signal advises the engineer of the need to pick up a train order at a station.

=== Hump shunting signal ===
In a hump yard, special signals may control the speed of trains propelling vehicles towards the hump.

=== Loading and unloading signals ===
Signals may be installed to control the movement of freight trains through a facility for loading or unloading minerals, for example coal. Unlike ordinary signals, there may be a series of identical signals installed along the track so that at least one is always visible to the train driver at any time. All signals in the same group display the same indication simultaneously. A 'stop' indication means "stop immediately", even if the train is not at the signal. The signals can also instruct a train to reverse.
