= North American railroad signals =

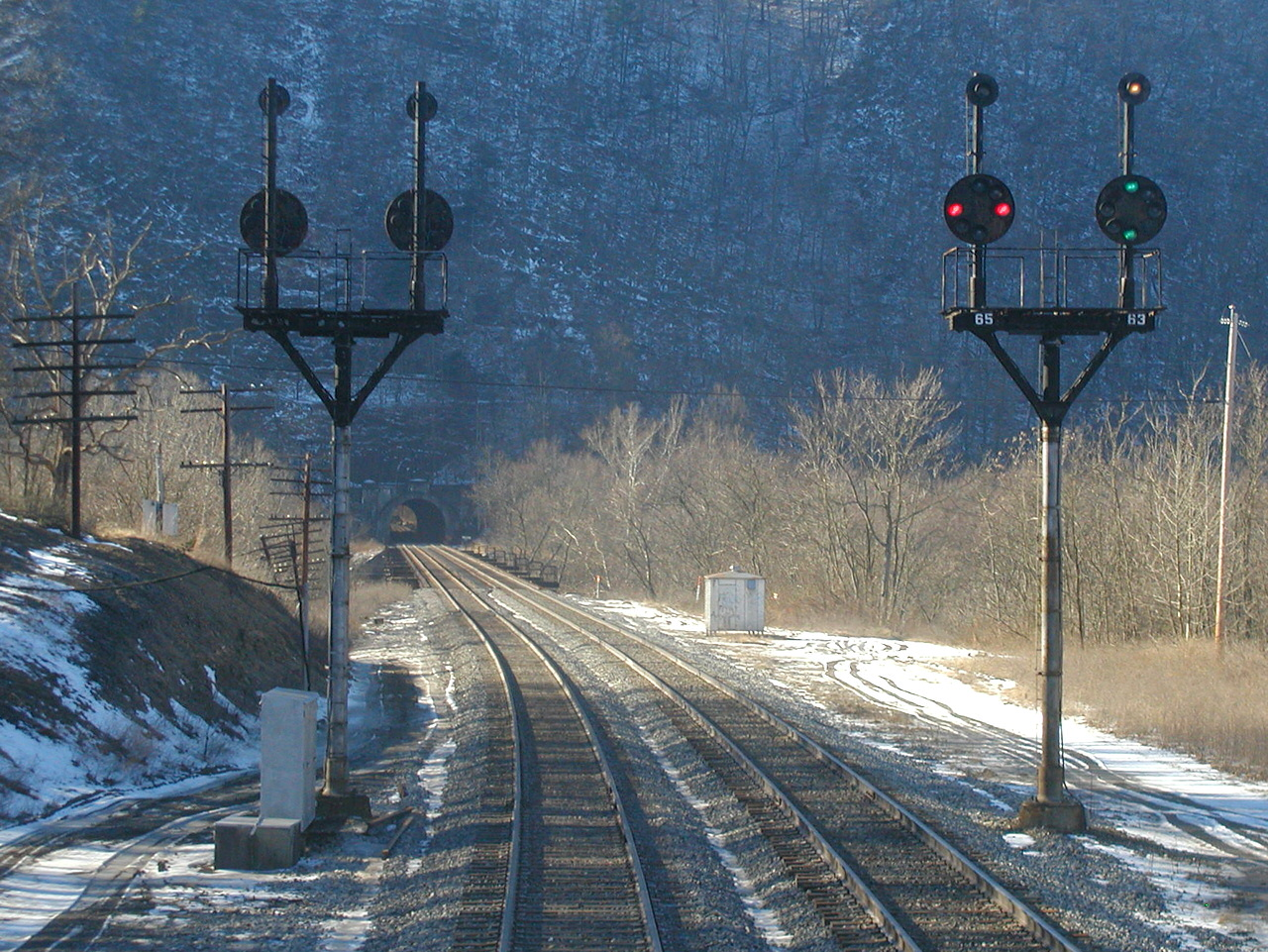
Baltimore and Ohio Railroad color position lights on bracket masts at Magnolia, West Virginia, United States

North American railroad signals generally fall into the category of multi-headed electrically lit units displaying speed-based or weak route signaling. Signals may be of the searchlight, color light, position light, or color position light types, each displaying a variety of aspects which inform the locomotive operator of track conditions so that they may keep their train under control and able to stop short of any obstruction or dangerous condition.

There is no national standard or system for railroad signaling in North America. Individual railroad corporations are free to devise their own signaling systems as long as they uphold some basic regulated safety requirements. Due to the wave of mergers that have occurred since the 1960s it is not uncommon to see a single railroad operating many different types of signaling inherited from predecessor railroads. This variety can range from simple differences of hardware to completely different rules and aspects. While there has been some recent standardization within railroads in terms of hardware and rules, diversity remains the norm.

This article will explain some of the aspects typically found in North American railroad signaling. For a more technical look at how signals actually work, see North American railway signaling.

== Signaling aspect systems ==
There are two main types of signaling aspect systems found in North America, speed signaling and weak route signaling. Speed signaling transmits information regarding how fast the train is permitted to be going in the upcoming segment of track; weak route signaling transmits information related to the route a train will be taking through a junction, and it is incumbent upon the engineer to govern the train's speed accordingly. Weak route signaling is applied with the term weak because some speed signal aspects may be used in the system and also because exact route information is not typically conveyed, only the fact of a diverging or straight route, each having a predictable range of known speeds.

Typically railroads in the eastern United States ran speed signaling, while railroads in the west used route signaling, with some mixing of systems in the Midwest and South. This was due to the lower train density in the west combined with generally simpler track layouts. Over time, the route signaling railroads have incorporated segments of speed signaling through merger and have also adopted more speed-based aspects into their systems. Of the five major Class 1 railroads in the United States, CSX uses speed signaling, Union Pacific and BNSF use speed enhanced route signaling (or what by now is effectively speed signaling with some route elements), and Norfolk Southern uses a mix of speed and route signaling based on the original owner of the line. Commuter railroads and Amtrak all use speed signaling where they own or maintain the tracks they run on. Canadian railways all use a strong system of speed signalling in Canada, but have some segments of route signalling on lines they have acquired in the United States.

== Common signaling practices ==
=== Signal types ===
North American signals are commonly of three types.

- Absolute – Absolute signals are usually connected to an interlocking controlled by a block operator or train dispatcher. Their most restrictive aspect is "stop" and trains cannot pass them at stop unless they obtain special authority. Absolute signals will default to displaying stop unless expressly cleared by a control authority. In older practice, multiple signal heads are directly above and below each other on the mast.
- Automatic – Automatic signals are governed by logic connected through electrical track circuits which detect the presence of trains or obstructions automatically. Automatic signals are permissive with their most restrictive aspect being one of the "restricted proceed" variety. Trains can pass an automatic signal displaying "restricted proceed" without any outside permission. Automatic signals are typically recognized by having an attached number plate and in older practice, having multiple signal heads offset from each other on the mast (i.e., on opposite sides of the mast).
- Semi-automatic – Semi-automatic signals are those that typically act as an automatic signal, but can be set to display an absolute "stop" aspect. Semi-automatic signals do not have a number plate, but can display an explicit "restricted proceed"-type signal.

Other types of signals include train order signals, manual block signals or signals governing special safety appliances such as slide fences, non-interlocked sidings, road crossings, etc. These are much less common than the three standard types.

=== Layout ===
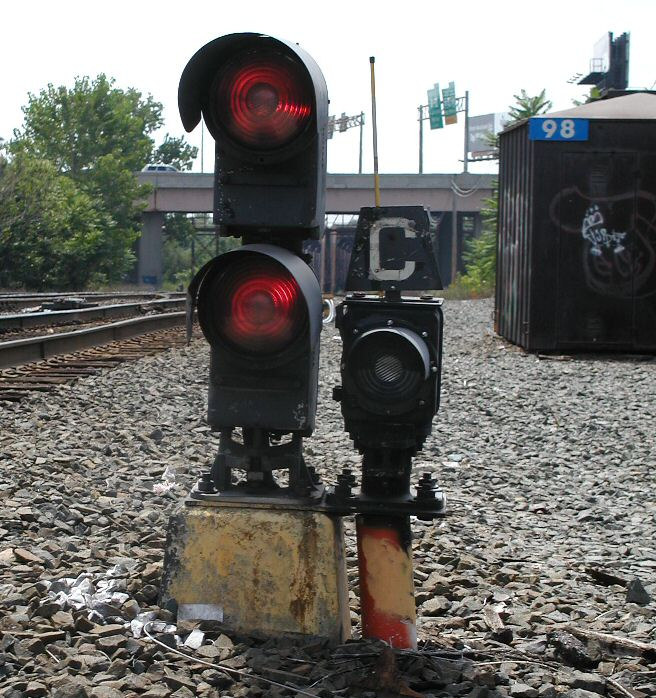
A stacked searchlight dwarf signal at Springfield, Massachusetts

North American signals generally follow a common layout. A high signal consists of one to three heads mounted roughly in a vertical stack, each head capable of displaying one to four different aspects. Automatic signals are identified with a number plate whereas absolute signals are not. The signal's aspect is based on a combination of the aspects each individual head displays. Where a signal has multiple heads, aspects are read from top to bottom and are described as "X over Y over Z".

Dwarf signals are smaller signals used in low-speed or restricted-clearance areas. Most signaling aspect systems have a parallel set of aspects for use with dwarf signals that differ from aspects used in high signals. Dwarf signals may have multiple heads just like a high signal, but sometimes dwarf signals use so-called "virtual heads" to save on space and cost. This is where a dwarf signal displays multiple lamps on what would ordinarily be a single signal head creating the effect of multiple signal heads. For example, a stack of dwarf lamps in the order yellow, red, green can display plain yellow, red and green as well as yellow over green and red over green.

Behind the signal head is placed a dark backing or target, which helps improve signal visibility in bright ambient lighting. Target designs vary, but are usually round or oval, depending on the layout of the signal lamps. For each type of signal there are usually a range of target dimensions that can be chosen by the individual railroad company. As dwarf signals are not designed to be seen from long distances, they are not generally equipped with targets.

=== Mounting ===
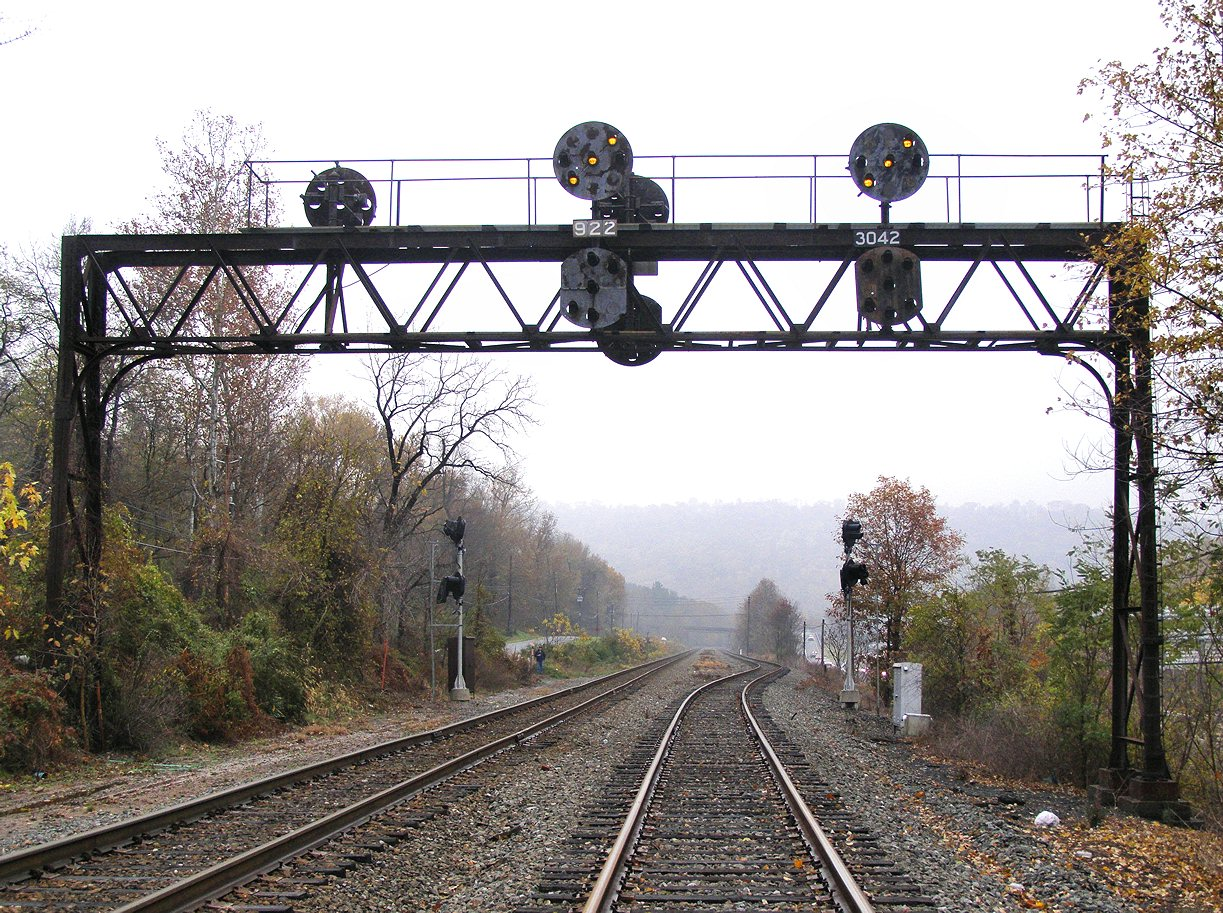
A Pennsylvania Railroad position light signal bridge with replacement mast signals in the background. The design of steam locomotives meant that all signals had to be placed to the right of the running track. Current diesel engine design allows both left- and right-hand siting.

Signals are most commonly mounted on trackside masts about 12 to 15 feet (3.7 to 4.6 m) high to put them in the eyeline of the engineer. Signals can also be mounted on signal bridges or cantilever masts spanning multiple tracks. Signal bridges and masts typically provide at least 20 feet (6.1 m) of clearance over the top of the rail. Bracket masts are arranged with multiple signals are mounted on the same masts governing two adjacent tracks. Bracket masts tend to be the tallest type of signal to allow the train crew to see the signal over a train on the intervening track. Signals in electrified territory may be mounted on the catenary structure, and signals on bi-directional lines may be mounted back-to-back on the same mounting device.

Prior to 1985, signals were required by regulation to be mounted above and to the right of the track they governed. This mounting was designed to allow the engineer to view the signal when driving a steam or diesel locomotive with a long hood that restricted the view to the left. In most situations, especially where bi-directional running was implemented, signals needed to be mounted above the track or on bracket masts to allow this right hand placement. As locomotive design changed to allow good visibility on both sides of the track, regulations were changed allowing railroads to shift to bi-directional mast type signals, using signal bridges only in special situations involving multiple tracks or restricted views.

Dwarf signals are typically mounted on the ground in areas of low speed movements or restricted clearances. Dwarf signals may be sometimes mounted higher up on a small mast or other structure for improved visibility. These can be known as "high dwarfs" or "stick signals," but a tall mounting does not change the lower speed applications of the dwarf signal.

=== Signal colors and lamps ===
Electric signal lamps are typically low-power (35 watt) incandescent lamps running on low-voltage direct current or, more recently, high-output LED arrays. Incandescent signals use a doublet lens combination to directionally focus their small power out over a long range (3,500 ft or 1,100 m in daylight). New LED signals may either use an unfocused array or act as a drop-in replacement behind a traditional lens. U.S. signal lenses have a standard diameter of 8 3/8 inches (210 mm). North American signals use a standard set of colors, defined in October 1905, and which became common to other modes of transportation as shown on page 384 of the Simmons-Boardman 1911 Signal Dictionary.

- Green – Used to indicate "clear" or proceed.
- Yellow – Used to warn the engineer of an impending stop or speed reduction for an occupied block ahead. Also used for low-speed movements.
- Red – Used to indicate a full stop or other restrictive condition, or used as a placeholder light (when that part of a signal is unused but to confirm to the crew the signal is working, so as not to require guessing the rest of the combination in case of a light failure).
- Blue – When on a signal doll post, indicates intervening track between the signal and the track to which the signal applies, or to indicate all equipment on the section of track to the rear of the blue signal is not to be moved as workers are under, on, or in the equipment.
- Purple – Obsolete. Up to around 1940, purple lenses were used rather than red as the "Stop" indication in some yards and derails. In 1952, the Interstate Commerce Commission ruled that purple should no longer be used in the U.S. for that purpose.
- Lunar white – Blue-filtered light to eliminate all trace of yellow used to indicate a restricted proceed condition.
- Lemon yellow (the AAR's official name) – Used in position light systems as an all-purpose high visibility color, greatest fog penetration.
- (Plain) white – Plain incandescent white light. Used in dwarf position light signals with frosted lenses.

Individual signal heads may be set to flash a color to create a different signal aspect. Signals in the United States typically flash only one head at a time, while signals in Canada may flash two heads at a time; flashing lights are generally less restrictive than steady lights.

A few rapid transit systems utilize just two signal lamp colors (lunar white for proceeding and red for a full stop); examples include the Baltimore Metro SubwayLink, the Washington Metro and the PATCO Speedline.

=== Speeds ===
Signal rules and aspects make use of several pre-defined speeds. These speeds are also used in Weak Route type signaling.

- Normal speed – The normal speed for the railroad line, also known as maximum authorized speed (MAS).
- Limited speed – A speed less than normal speed that was employed starting in the 1940s for use with higher-speed turnouts (switches). This speed is defined by individual railroads and ranges from 40 miles per hour (64 km/h) to 60 miles per hour (97 km/h).
- Medium speed – Original concept for a standard "reduced" speed normally set to 30 miles per hour (48 km/h) and can range as high as 40 miles per hour (64 km/h). This is the typical speed for diverging movements through interlockings and is also the speed trains are limited to when approaching a Stop or Restricted Proceed-type signals.
- Slow speed – 15 miles per hour (24 km/h) while within the limits of an interlocking and 20 mph when not in the limits of an interlocking. This is used for trains negotiating complex trackwork at interlockings.
- Restricted speed – Used for trains entering or operating in unsignaled territory or when entering a de-energized track circuit. Regulatory definition of no greater than 20 miles per hour (32 km/h) outside interlocking limits, 15 mph within interlocking limits. Trains operating at restricted speed must be able to stop within half the range of vision short of any obstruction, and must look out for broken rails.

=== Fault tolerance ===
Signal aspects are designed to incorporate some degree of fault tolerance. Aspects are often designed so that a faulty or obscured lamp will cause the resulting aspect to be more restrictive than the intended one. Operating rules (GCOR, NORAC or CROR) require that dark or obscured signal heads be treated as displaying their most restrictive aspect (i.e. stop), but fault-tolerant aspect design can help the engineer take a safer course of action before the failure of a signal becomes apparent. While not all aspects are fault-tolerant, the green lamp on the topmost head is only used by the least restrictive signal aspect, "Clear", so there is no case where a failure could accidentally display a clear aspect.

Where a signal aspect incorporates a flashing lamp, the flashing lamp is always applied to less restrictive signals. This is to prevent a stuck flashing relay from accidentally upgrading the signal.

Some signaling logic incorporates "bulb out" (lamp failure) or other fault detection, to attempt to display the most restrictive aspect in case of a fault. However, this feature is not required nor universally adopted.

== Signal types ==
=== Semaphore signals ===
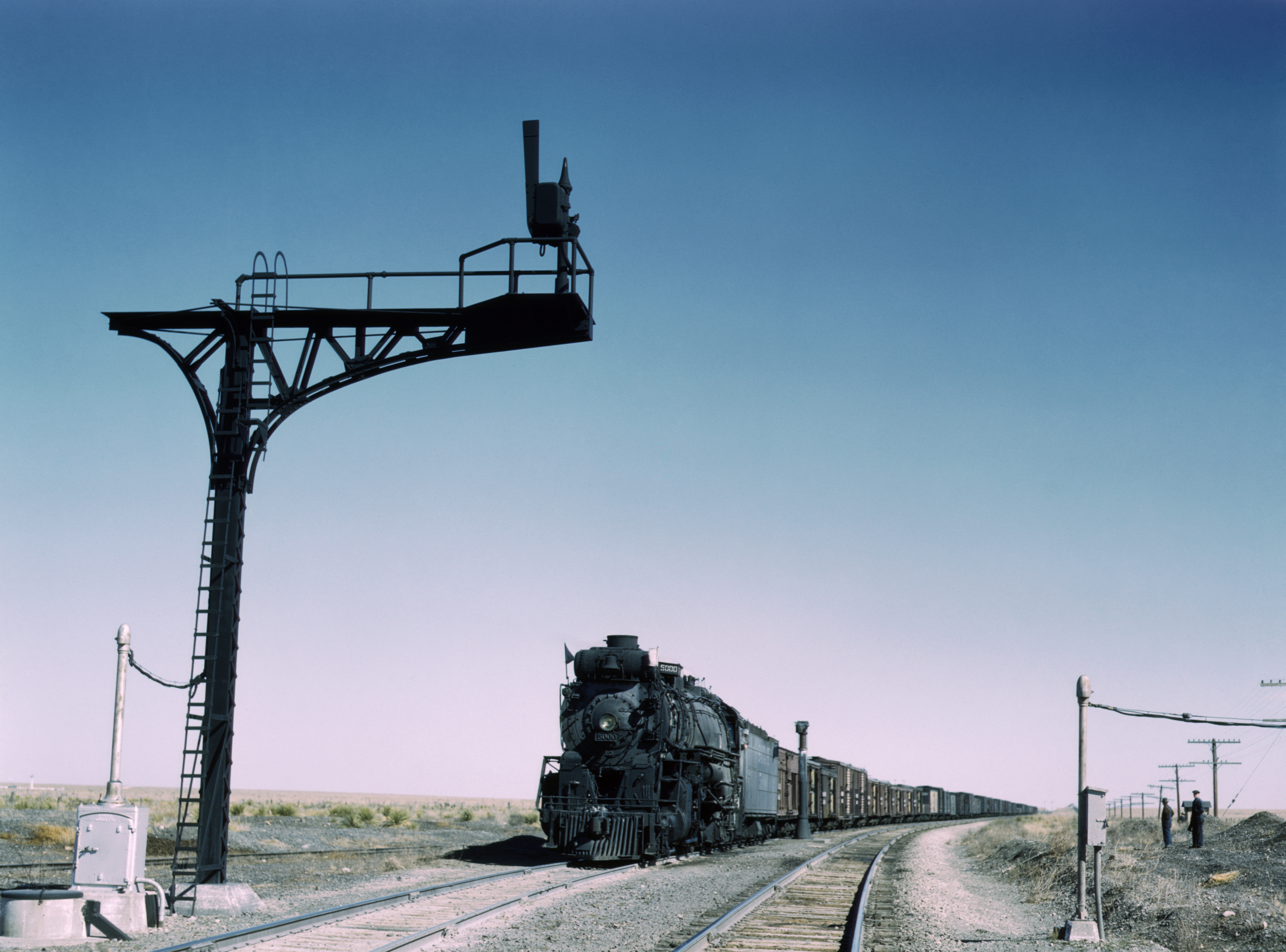
A semaphore signal on the Atchison, Topeka and Santa Fe Railway in 1943

Semaphore signals were first developed in England in 1841. Some U.S. railroads began to install them in the early 1860s, and semaphores gradually displaced other types of signals. The Union Switch & Signal company (US&S) introduced an electro-pneumatic design in 1881. This was more reliable than earlier, purely mechanical versions, and more railroads began to use them. At that time, however, they were considerably more expensive than Hall disc, or "banjo", signals.

By the end of the 19th century, particularly as trains became longer and faster, and railroad lines grew more congested, the banjo signal was considered to have a single and terminal flaw: visibility. The internal disc was difficult to see in foggy weather and when snow clung to the glass panel. Earlier types of electro-pneumatic semaphores made by US&S had seen some limited application by 1880 as automatic block signals. The need to maintain air pressure in the long pneumatic lines eventually led the railroads to discontinue their widespread use as automatic block signals. However, these types did see long service in interlocking plants. Early semaphores also had limited range with manual wire operation and poor reliability in bad weather. Thus some railroads continued to use disc signals where automatic block signal operation was needed between manual block stations as borne out by period rule books well into the 1920s and beyond.

By the early 1890s more railroads began installing electric motor-operated semaphore signals, which were visible at distances of thousands of feet, during the day and under inclement weather conditions. In 1893 the high-voltage, electric motor automatic block signal semaphore made its debut. By 1898, the US&S Style "B" semaphore, the first successful low-voltage, entirely enclosed mechanism electric motor semaphore appeared. It was revolutionary, improving on all earlier semaphore designs, with the last such example being taken out of service as recently as 2009 on the former Siskiyou line of the SP, now CORPS.

The motor-controlled North American semaphores used since the advent of the track circuit block system of 1872, provided a form of automation sought after by the railroads to reduce labor costs and improve reliability over manually operated systems as in the UK, Germany and elsewhere. Dwarf signals were worked mechanically, pneumatically to give restricting-type signals as did mast-type signals at interlockings, but motorized dwarfs were more common after the development of the Model 2A signal in 1908. As early as 1915, the technological push by such intellectual giants as A.H. Rudd of the Pennsylvania R.R. and his concept of speed signaling combined with his development of the position light signal and the concurrent color-light signals using William Churchill's doublet lens combination in practical terms made the semaphore technically obsolete.

Semaphore signals have been almost completely replaced by light signals in North America, but they contain several important design elements. The overwhelming majority of semaphore-type signals used in North America, and the only type surviving in service as of 2009 are of the three-position upper-quadrant variety. Those of the lower-quadrant variety would most often have two positions, but three roundels, with two being of the more restrictive color. This 60–75-degree lower-quadrant three-aperture design of semaphore spectacle was known as the "Continuous Light Spectacle" and predates the Loree-Patenall patented, three-position upper-quadrant spectacle of 1902. The intent was to reduce the chance of a malfunction or snowfall causing the signal to only partially rise towards the horizontal, yet still displaying the most restrictive color night indication. Color images of these signals bear this out as the "red-red-green" of the home and "yellow-yellow-green" of the distant arms were universally used on 60 and 75 degree (B&M, Central Vermont) lower-quadrant semaphores. There were no three-color 60- or 75-degree signals used. The "standard" 90-degree three-position lower-quadrant spectacle saw limited application (the last were used in terminals in Memphis, Tennessee, and St. Louis, Missouri, United States) as the Lorre-Patenall upper-quadrant spectacle provided significantly greater visual range.

The blade portion of the semaphore was of several designs, each conveying a different meaning:

- Those with a square end are "absolute" signals and generally force trains to stop when in their most restrictive position.
- Those with a pointed end are "permissive" signals and permit a train to continue at a significantly lower speed rather than having to come to a complete stop.
- Semaphores with a "fishtail" end (that is, a V-notch end) are "distant" signals conveying to the engineer what the aspect of the next signal is (as a forewarning).

The color of the semaphore frequently matches the above categories as well, with absolute signals typically having a white stripe on a red blade and the others having a black stripe (most often repeating the shape of the blade's end) of either square or 60 degree, were the RSA Standard.

=== Searchlight signals ===
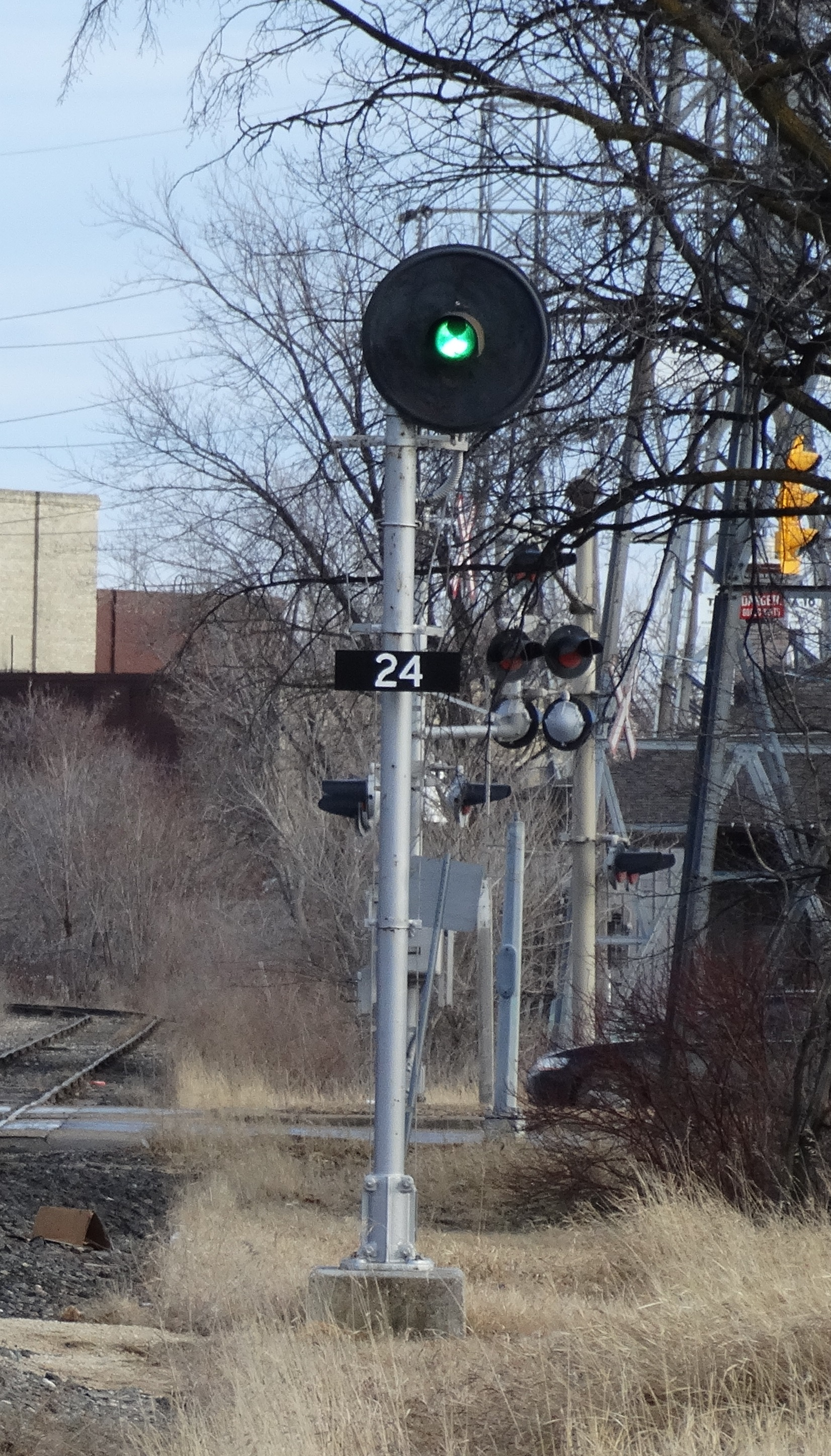
An example of a one-head searchlight signal on a Canadian National track in Winnipeg, Manitoba, Canada

The 1911 patenting of the doublet-lens combination for long range (2,500 ft or 760 m in daylight) by Dr. William Churchill at Corning Glass's research facility in Corning, New York, United States, indicated the reign of the semaphore signal in railroad use was rapidly approaching its end. By 1916, this optical combination and a flagging sales response prompted the management of the Hall Signal Company to realize their just-introduced and most advanced Style "L" semaphore mechanism (the very last produced by any U.S. signal company) was indeed obsolete. That dual-lens device had been developed by Cornell University's William Churchill, while he was working at Corning Glass Works. He had finished developing color standards for railroad glassware, which Corning had patented on October 10, 1905. They were immediately put to use as daylight short-range and tunnel-type electric incandescent-bulb illuminated signals. He then turned his attention to medium- and long-range daylight signals using the same incandescent electric lamps with greatly improved optics: the doublet-lens combination.

Hall's response to this situation was to buy the 1918 filed patents from one Mr. Blake for his searchlight signal. In reality, the searchlight signal was an updated and modernized variation of the old Hall enclosed disc signal. What Blake had done was to harness the standard railroad three-position polarized-vane relay, add a miniature spectacle and Pyrex, low-expansion borosilicate glass roundels, and couple that with a very efficient elliptical reflector and optical lens system with a very large 10 1/2-inch-diameter (270 mm) stepped outer lens. This revolutionary development provided a signal with a visible indication of over 1 mile (1.6 km) from the signal in broad daylight, when the signal was on tangent track. The early color light signals were visible for only about half that distance (2,500 feet or 760 metres) while using about the same electrical current, then a major concern in "primary battery territory". By 1925, the development of "high-transmission colors" of railroad glassware by Gage and Corning Glass improved this limited distance to an acceptably competitive 3,500 feet (1,100 m) on tangent track.

In the UK, original electromechanical searchlight signals consisted of a low-power incandescent bulb mounted behind a semaphore spectacle devoid of a blade behind a target. The Union Switch and Signal Company searchlight signal ubiquitous to North America had an internal cable with weights system to mechanically align the signal in the red position if there was a system failure.

Searchlight signal use became widespread mostly due to their relatively low maintenance, high visibility, low power consumption, and after 1932 using a compound lens with a 4-watt 3-volt bulb that worked quite well in territory with battery-powered signaling. Also of significance was the single lens giving the indications in multiple-head interlocking signals in a fixed location with regard to the mast and the other signal heads, this not being the case with multiple-lens color light signals. In time the costs of the significantly more expensive searchlight signals relay began to outweigh the savings from its compact size and single bulb when compared with the simple multiple-lens color light signal. By the end of the 1980s the searchlight had lost its position as the most popular signal style in North America.

To overcome the issues of associated with moving parts, new solid-state, single-lensed signals were developed. The first such product, marketed in 1968 as the "Unilens" by Safetran, uses fiber optics to concentrate the output of up to four light sources behind a single lens. However, other than as low-speed signals requiring only short-range visibility, these have not been entirely successful and most are now being removed from mainline service after a relatively short working life. Capable of four aspects, most examples had two lamp units simultaneously light red to give the most restrictive indication greater visual range than obtained with the use of a single lamp unit.

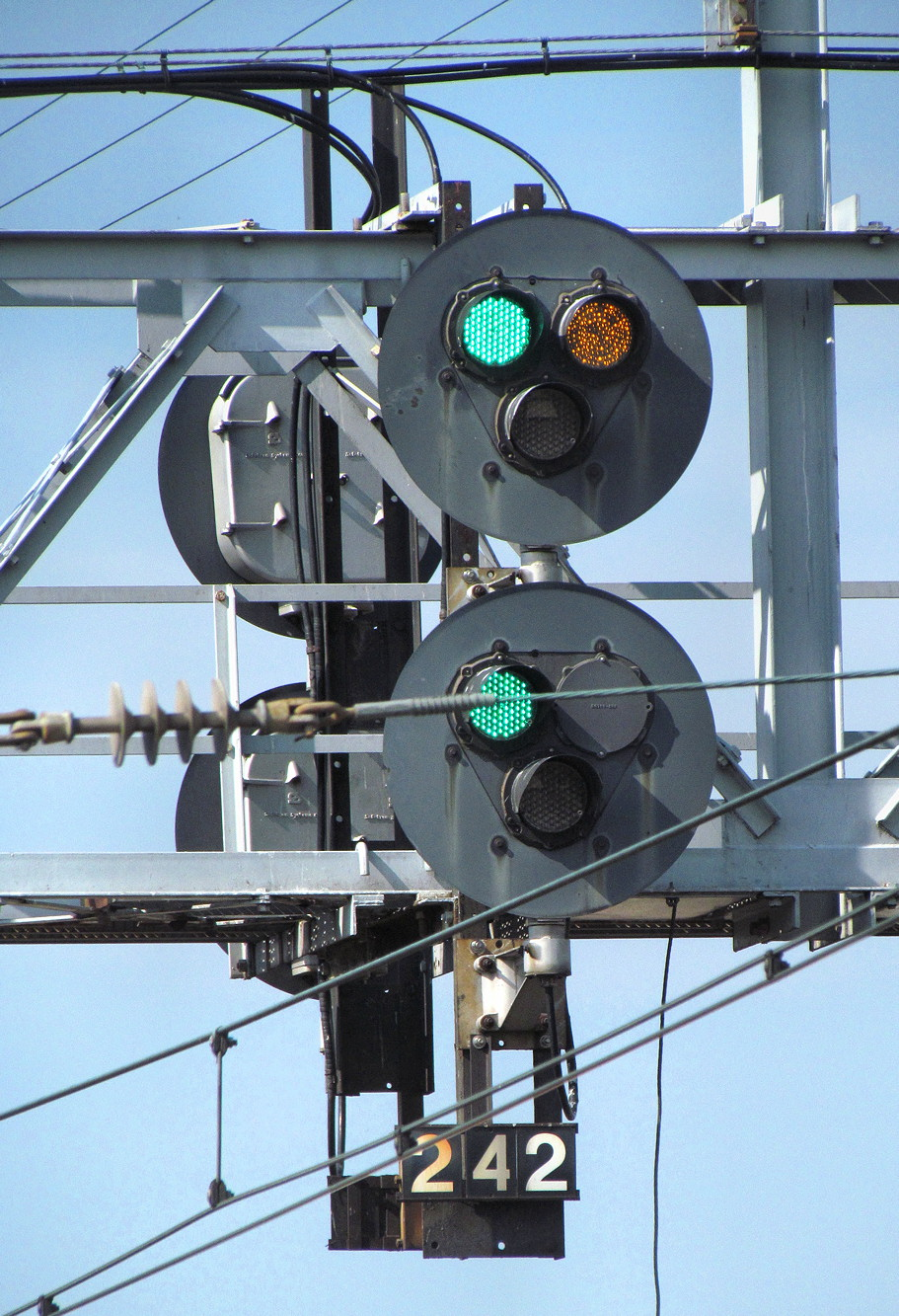
Target style color light signals on the SEPTA main line

=== Triangular color light signals ===
Triangularly arranged color light signals consist of a cluster of three color lamp sockets in the middle of a large circular target. They were one of the first widely used type of high intensity color light signal, notably adopted by the New York Central and Seaboard Coast Line railroads, and later used exclusively by Conrail and New Jersey Transit.

The original General Railway Signal (GRS) Type "G" design consisted of a cast iron box containing three doublet lens units in a triangular arrangement. The US&S "TR" and "TP" models used three smaller connected single-lamp housings with a common background. The long defunct Chicago Signal Company had a version that used standard 5 3/8-inch (140 mm) switch lamp lenses (often of Macbeth manufacture) instead of the otherwise standard inverse-convex and stepped lens type found in the standard inner-doublet design. The Union version was later updated to a single unit akin to the GRS model. As modular color light signals have become widespread, target-type configurations have been typically offered alongside vertical-type configurations. The triangular color light signal was especially useful in physically restricted and confined areas.

=== Vertical color light signals ===
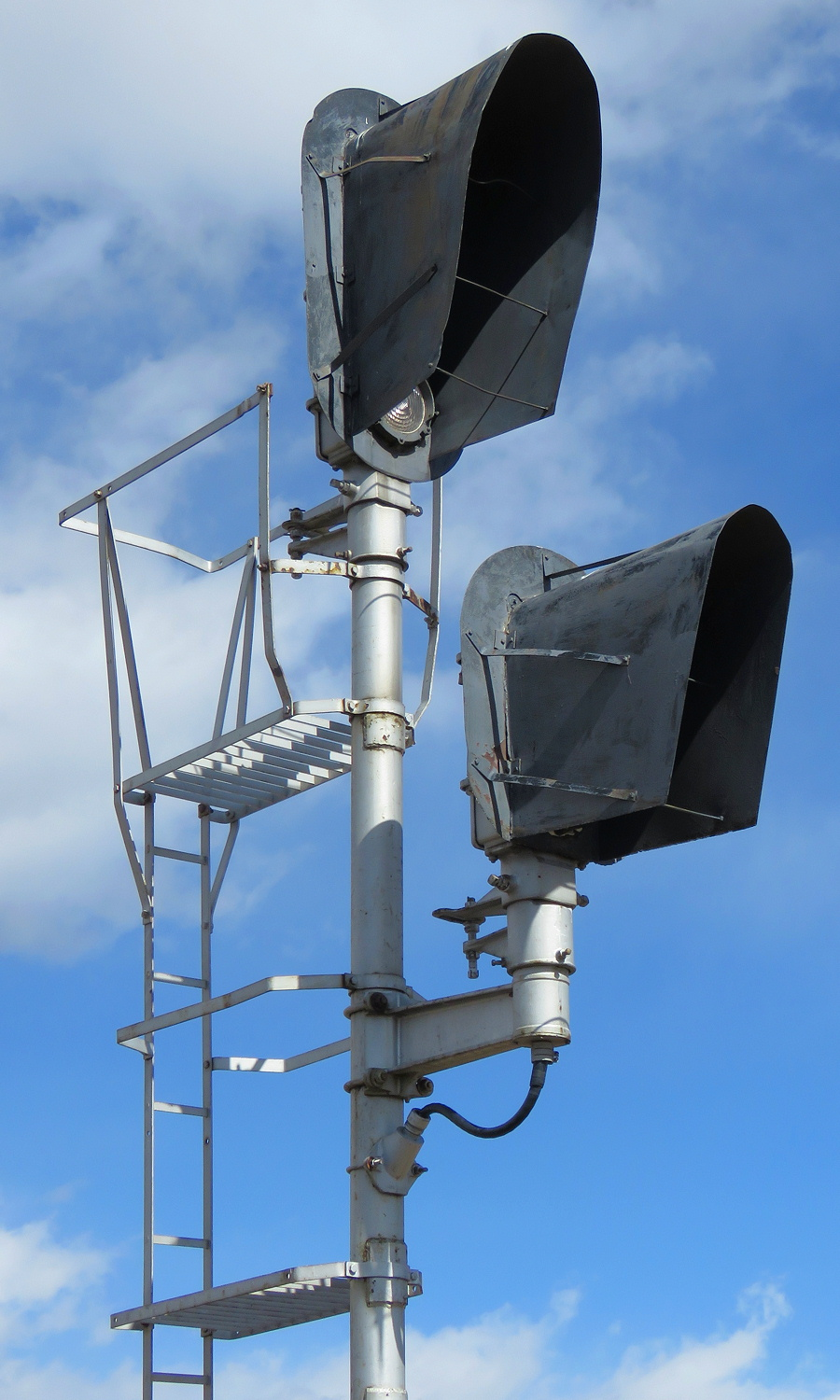
Hooded GRS Type D modular color lights on the DRGW TN Pass Line.

Vertical color light signals are the second major pattern of color light signals, and today represent the most popular form of signal in North America, supplanting the searchlight. These signals are not different from the triangular-type color signal in function, but present a much altered visual appearance.

Continuing problems with reliable long-range light sources from a single colored lens and a focused bulb restricted the first use of color light signals to short-range daytime exterior applications, or tunnels and other underground or low-speed complexes. The 1911 New York Penn Station project was one example of this type of color light signal, with an outer colored 8 3/8-inch (210 mm) optical lens, some of which are still in service as of 2011.

Development of the doublet lens by Churchill at Corning Glass Works allowed an electric light source to be more effective than with previous daytime color light signal designs. There are two main types of cases: the single case, where two or more lamps were contained within a single cast housing, and the modular light, where each lamp was an independent unit capable of being arranged into a signal of arbitrary configuration, including triangular. US&S has a popular single case type with its styles R/R-2, P-2/5 and N, while GRS offered their triangularly arranged Type G, with the Chicago Signal Company providing a similar version. Today's Safetrans Triangular is a copy of the GRS Type G but with vertically arranged double doors.

Signals like the model N/N-2 could also be mounted directly on the ground as a dwarf signal without a backing. The most notable user of this type of signal was the Chesapeake and Ohio, but units could be found on railroads all over the continent.

Over time, due to its low cost and versatility, the modular color light signal became the standard in North America. The first modular system was the GRS Type "D", first marketed in 1922, and adopted by the Southern Railroad along with many others: D&RG, etc. The GRS units used a smaller "background" than the comparable US&S vertical possibly somewhat compromising long range visibility. Today the most popular type of new signal in North America is a modular design manufactured by Safetran, as it is the cheapest, with all of the four major Class 1 railroads installing it almost exclusively. Today, both GRS and Safetran market separate modular systems for high and dwarf signals, while US&S uses the single modular Style "R-2" design for high and Style N-2 for dwarfs.

Modular color lights allow for all the cost savings inherent in color lights, but also make it easier for railroads to stock signals and perform alterations to interlockings. Instead of having to order custom heads, new modules can be taken from stock to build new signals or modify existing heads. With simple bracketry, even triangular color lights may be built up with these standardized components.

Modular color light signals are often fitted with a full-length sun shade often called "Vader hoods" by railroad employees and railfans due to the appearance similar to Darth Vader in the Star Wars franchise. These extended signal shades improves visibility in bright sunny conditions and blocks other light from other sources that could illuminate and provide a false aspect to the engineer. The shades also provide an unintended bonus of helping to focus the light to be more noticeable from afar. This shade was originally adopted by the Union Pacific and Denver Rio Grand and Western railroads to prevent snow buildup on one shade from obscuring the signal lens above it.

=== Position light signals ===
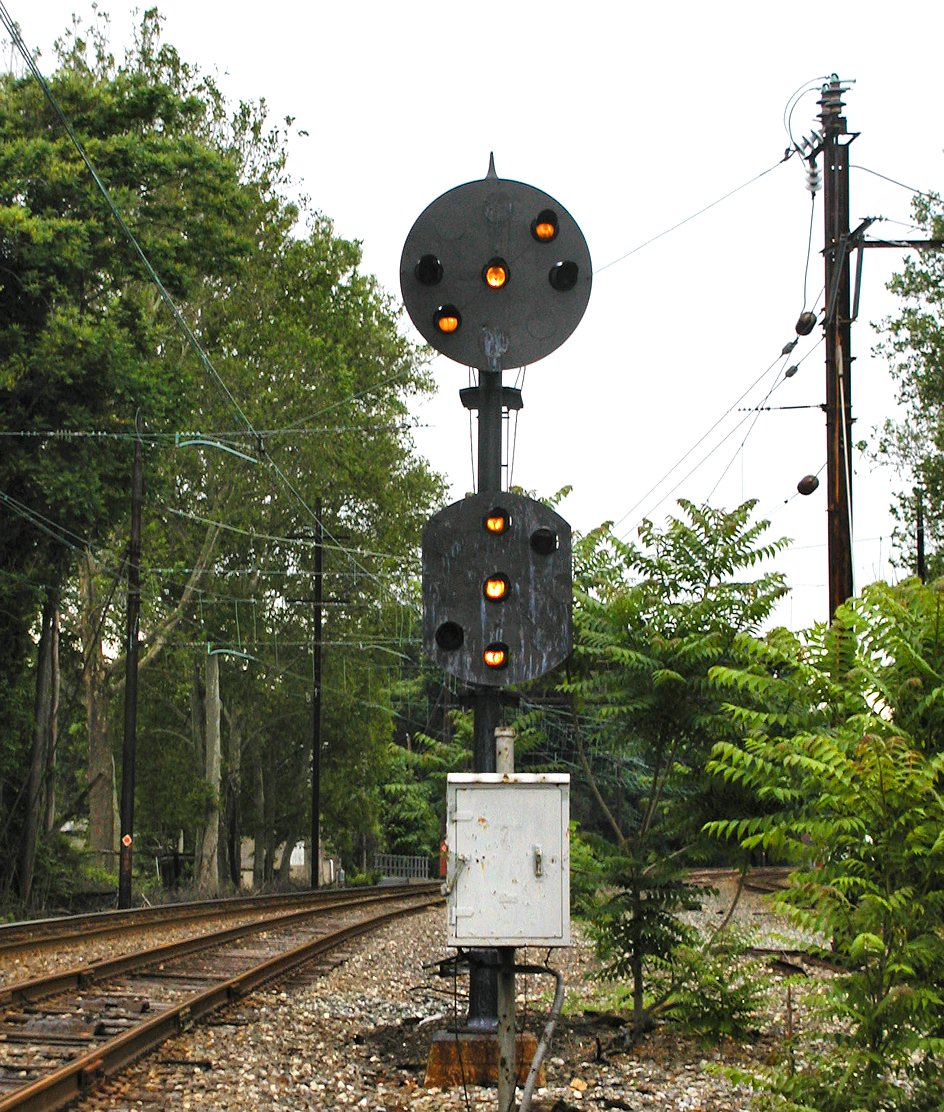
A Pennsylvania Railroad high signal displaying Approach Medium

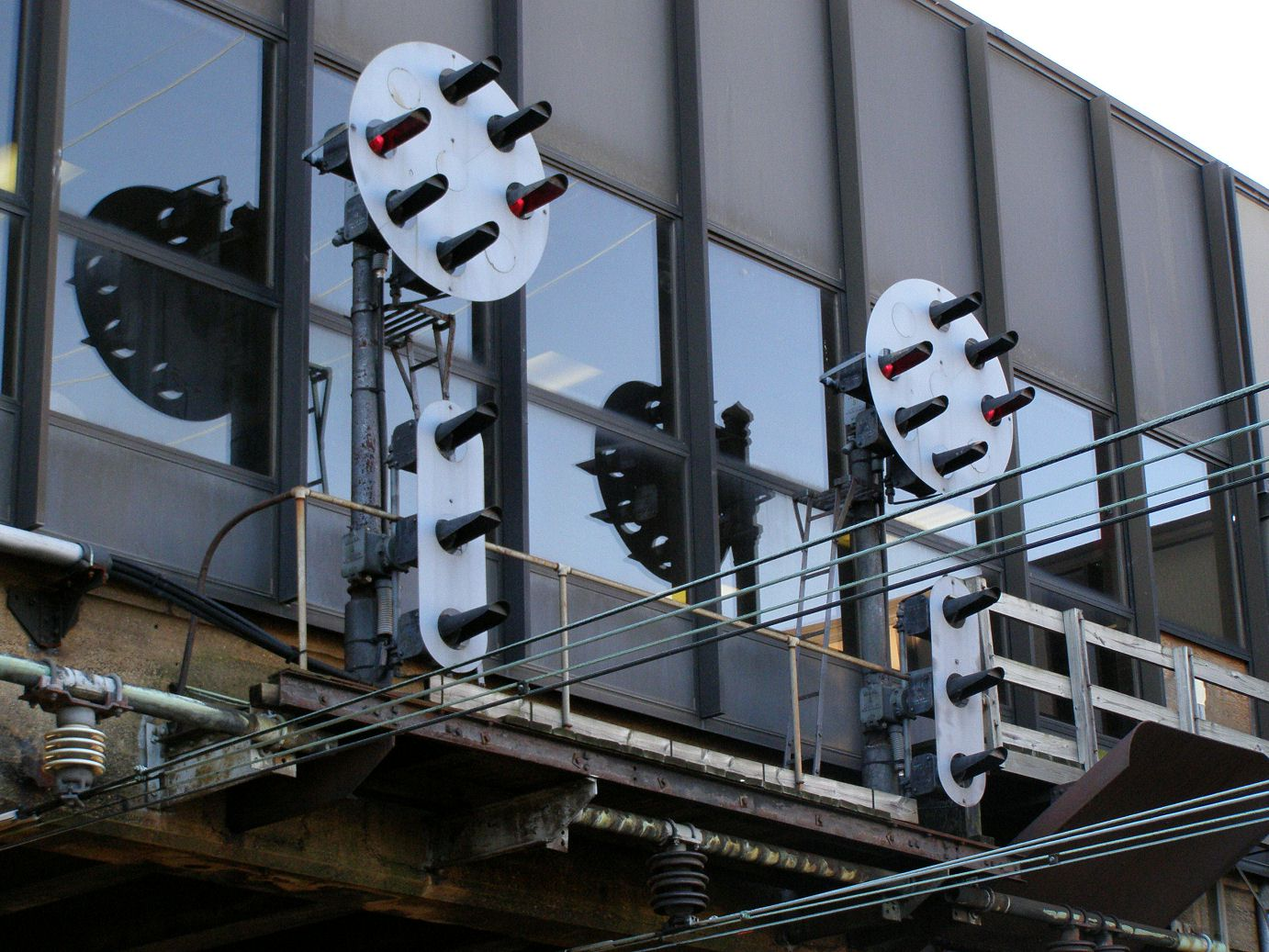
Amtrak colorized position lights at Trenton, New Jersey, United States

Position light signals use rows of 5 3/8-inch-diameter (140 mm) lamps to simulate the positions of an upper quadrant semaphore blade. Position lights were developed by A.H. Rudd, Superintendent of Signalling of the Pennsylvania Railroad (PRR). They were introduced in 1915 as a replacement for semaphore signals on the Main Line between Paoli and Philadelphia to reduce the maintenance required by semaphore signals as well as visibility problems caused by the new overhead electrification project. The original system used rows of four lights. The system was later reduced to use rows of three lamps, surrounding a common center. This reduced the "sail" effect of the inordinately large and tombstone-shaped background of the four-light variant. The original installation made use of lamps positioned in front of a free-standing black sheet-iron backing, but shortly thereafter, the new circular background was fitted to the then reduced three-lamp-per-row device and directly to the backing on a framework referred to as a "spider."

Each position lamp unit is equipped with a 12-volt, 6-candlepower bulb mounted in front of a parabolic mirror that increases the relatively weak bulb's intensity. To avoid phantom indications the design uses a special inverted toric lens (i.e. a single clear Fresnel lens mounted step sides outwards) with a portion of the lens steps painted black. A light-yellow-tinted conical glass with frosted tip was chosen, as this color was determined to have the highest visibility in fog based on empirical studies at Corning at that time.

A standard high-position light consists of two heads; the bottom head can remain dark unless it is needed. In addition to the high-position light signals the PRR developed a dwarf position light, as with many railroads, these dwarf signals are also referred to as a "pot", a tradition carried over from the 19th century revolving pot-type signal. Four plain white lamps are able to display four low-speed aspects each with two lamps. In 1930, close clearances of the Philadelphia Suburban Station complex spurred development of the pedestal-type position, which consisted of two-position dwarf signals in a common cast backing.

PRR-type position lights were used throughout the vast PRR system as well as the Long Island Rail Road (LIRR), a PRR subsidiary, and the Norfolk and Western, which was one-third owned by the PRR. US&S was the sole supplier of classic position light equipment, as this manufacturer's factory was formerly on the four-track mainline of the PRR in Swissvale, Pennsylvania, United States.

In 1954, the PRR experimented installing red lenses in the horizontal position of the upper head to increase the distant visibility of absolute Stop signals at Overbrook interlocking. Under the Penn Central and later Conrail it became standard practice to add these red lenses to high-position lights and even some pedestal signals. The Norfolk and Western modified its signals to use red and green lenses in the upper head Stop and Clear positions and yellow lenses everywhere else. In the 1980s Amtrak modified most of its former-PRR position lights to use the equivalent color light colors in all of the positions of both heads. Internally referred to as position color lights, these are not to be confused with color position lights described below, which while functionally similar are structurally considerably different.

New PRR-type position lights continued to be installed until the 1980s on former Conrail systems. Today most of the old PRR position lights are slowly being replaced by modern color lights, but Amtrak, SEPTA and the LIRR continue to install new position lights (Amtrak's being of the colorized variety). US&S no longer manufactures position light equipment, but updated models from Safetran continue to be available.

=== Color position light ===
A full B&O-style CPL signal on CSX at Carroll interlocking, Baltimore, Maryland, United States

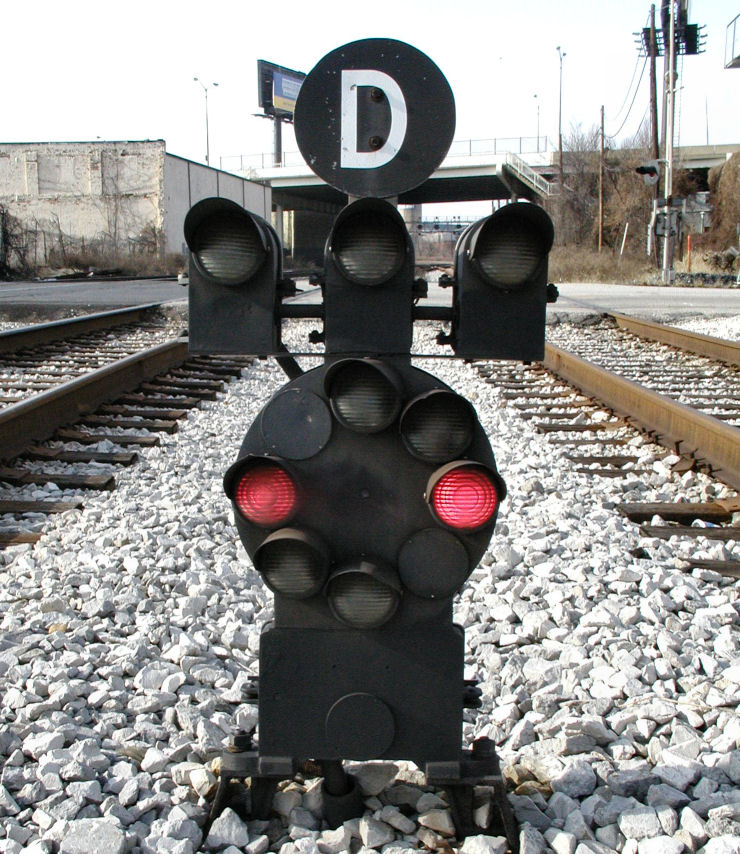
A CPL dwarf signal on CSX at Bailey interlocking, Baltimore

The color position light (CPL) signal was developed by Frank Patenal, superintendent of signaling of the Baltimore and Ohio (B&O) railroad, circa 1918. He also developed a proprietary signal-aspect system to replace the earlier A.H. Rudd, ARA standard signaling system (PRR-based) then in use. The CPL system was unique in that it was a conceptually original design instead of being an update of an existing system. The CPL system incorporates several design principles that are otherwise unique to North American signaling. Use of the color red only in the case of an absolute stop or restricted speed situation is the most significant characteristic. The other 11 standard possible combinations do not display a red aspect.

The CPL consists of a central position target with up to four pairs of doublet lens units around the perimeter of the background disc. The lens units are spaced at 45-degree axes using the positions: green |, yellow /, red — and a lunar white \ for restricting also being present in some installations. The main head is surrounded by up to six markers at the 12:00, 2:30, 4:30, 6:00, 8:30 and 10:30 o'clock positions. The function of the main head was block occupancy information with green representing two or more clear blocks, yellow one clear block, and red/lunar white representing a restricting indication, meaning the engineman was permitted to enter his train into an occupied block. The individual marker lamps provide speed information, 12 o'clock being normal speed, 6 being medium speed (limited speed if flashing), 10 being normal to medium (limited if flashing), 2 being normal to slow, 8 being medium to medium, 4 being medium to slow and no lit markers being slow to slow.

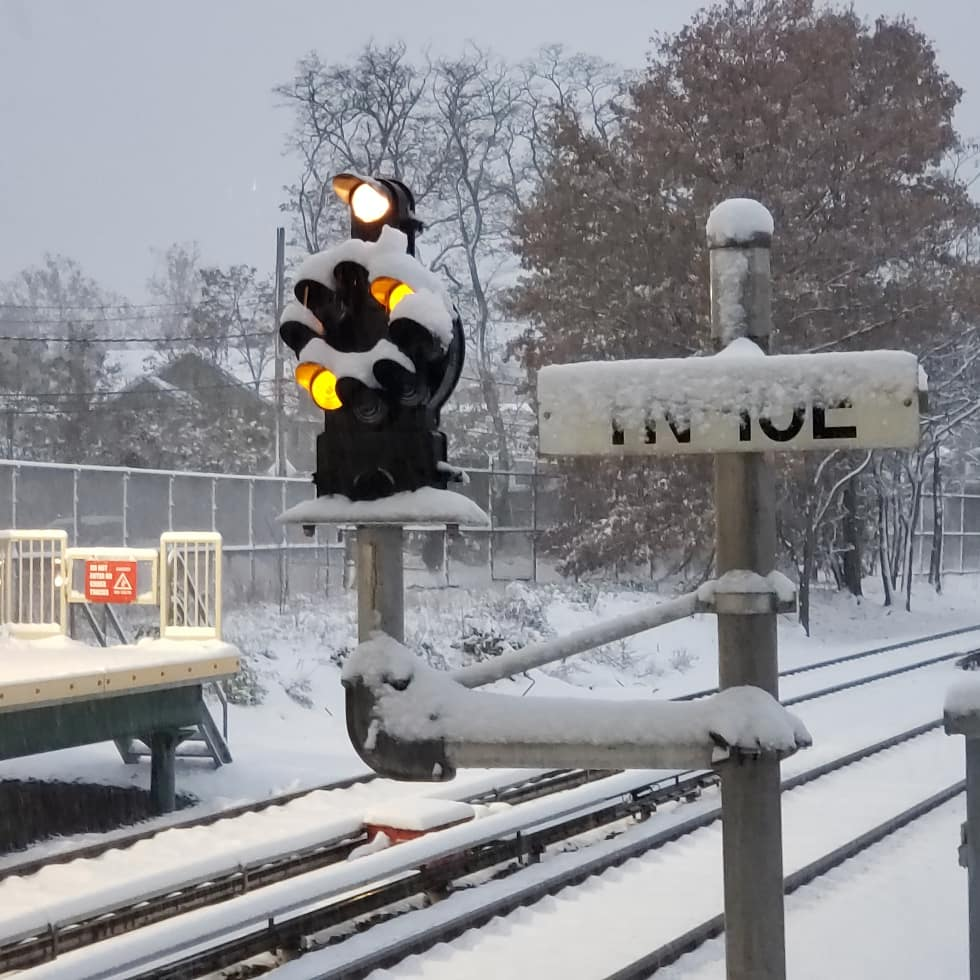
B&O CPL signal displaying yellow on the Staten Island Railway, 2018

This CPL was first deployed on the Staten Island Railroad (a B&O subsidiary) in the 1920s, and deployed system-wide shortly thereafter. Parts of the Chicago and Alton Railroad received CPLs later, when the B&O gained control of that line. In the 1980s both Amtrak's Chicago Union Station and Metra's Chicago Northwestern Station installed dwarf CPLs to replace earlier signals in those terminals.

As of 2008 and as with all U.S. railroads, CSX is slowly replacing all of the remaining CPLs on its system with contemporary vertical color light LED signals. The signals on the old Alton Railroad have also been almost entirely replaced as have many of the CPL dwarfs at the two Chicago terminals. The sole exception is the Staten Island Railroad, which recently upgraded its signaling system with new CPLs using modern Safetran position light equipment.

=== Obsolete mechanical and electrical signals ===
==== Early mechanical signals ====
The first signals employed on an American railroad were a system of flags used on the Newcastle and Frenchtown Turnpike and Rail Road in the 1830s. The railroad then developed a more effective system consisting of wooden balls, painted red, white or black, and hoisted up or down a pole on a rope-and-pulley system. The initial use of these signals was merely to indicate the on-time status of trains, rather than to control train movements. The wooden balls were often configured with lanterns for nighttime use. Ball signals were first used to direct train movements in 1852, on the New York and New Haven Railroad. Other mechanical signals used during the 19th century include:

- A 4 feet (1.2 m) disc, painted red and mounted on a revolving pole; it indicated "stop" when positioned to face an approaching train.
- A pivoted board, called a "smashboard", which could be operated to swing into position across the track.
- The Reading Railroad used vane signals mounted on wooden towers. Painted boards (vanes) of various colors were moved into position to signify danger (stop), caution, and safety (proceed). The vanes were illuminated at night by lanterns.
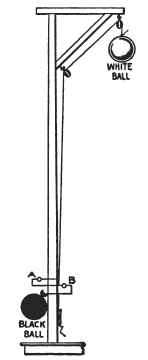
Wooden ball signal

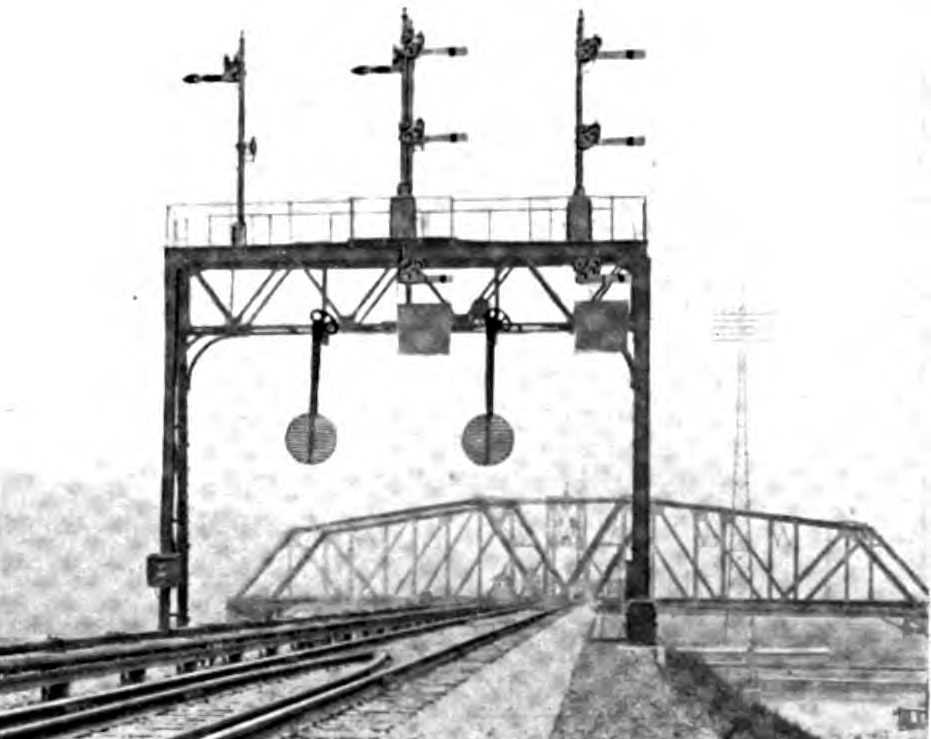
A smashboard installation on the approach to a swingbridge

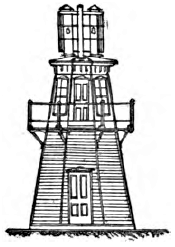
Vane signal mounted on a tower

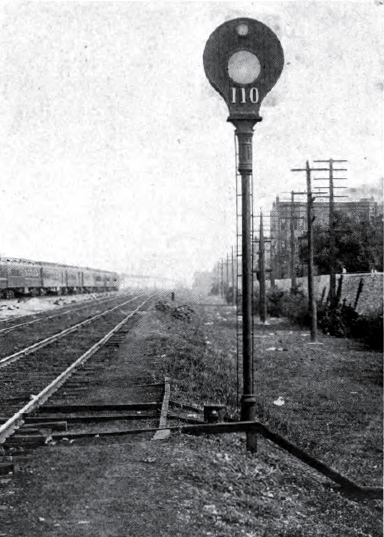
Hall disc signal

==== Hall disc signals ====
The Hall disc signal (also called a "banjo" signal) was the first electrically operated signal to be widely adopted by American railroads. Thomas Hall patented his disc signal design in 1867.

A banjo-shaped wooden case housed a large iron wire hoop with red silk stretched and glued over it. The opposite end had a much smaller hoop in which a very thin disc of colored glass was secured. This entire iron wire assembly was pivoted inside an electromagnet on what was known as a "Z" armature which was wound with copper magnet wire. When the coil was energized, the wire hoops were moved away from the large glass opening in the front of the wooden "banjo" case exposing its white-painted interior. The colored glass disc at the same time moving away from a clear primitive Fresnel lens at the top of the case which was backed up on the rear side of the case with a kerosene lamp. The disc signal was first placed into service in 1870 on the New York and New Haven Railroad at Stamford, Connecticut, United States, using a track treadle device to activate it, as the track circuit was not developed until 1872 by Dr. William Robinson.

The Hall Signal Company installed the disc signals as part of automatic block signal systems, initially utilizing line wire circuits, running on poles alongside the tracks, connecting the track treadle devices. One of the earliest such systems was installed in 1871 on the Eastern Railroad (later the Boston & Maine). About 1500 disc signals were operational by 1896.

The all-metal US&S enclosed disc signal was introduced in 1896 and had one version that employed both a red and a green banner (as well as both colored glasses) that were mechanically arranged in such a way as to have the banners and glass roundels exchange places within the signal case as the indication required.

== Extant mechanical and electrical signals ==
There are examples of various mechanical and electrical signals in several railway museums and in the collections of a very few railroad enthusiasts. These include signals that were manufactured by US&S, GRS, Hall and even the Federal Signal Company. The Hall Company's 1924-introduced variant of the dwarf position color light signal (or "PCL" as they were referred to at that time) are among the most rare and sought after by collectors, as are the extremely rare mechanical dwarf semaphores of the T. George Stiles Company. These signals were installed at the beginning of the 20th century by the New Haven Railroad and used into the 1980s.

== Common signal rule classes ==
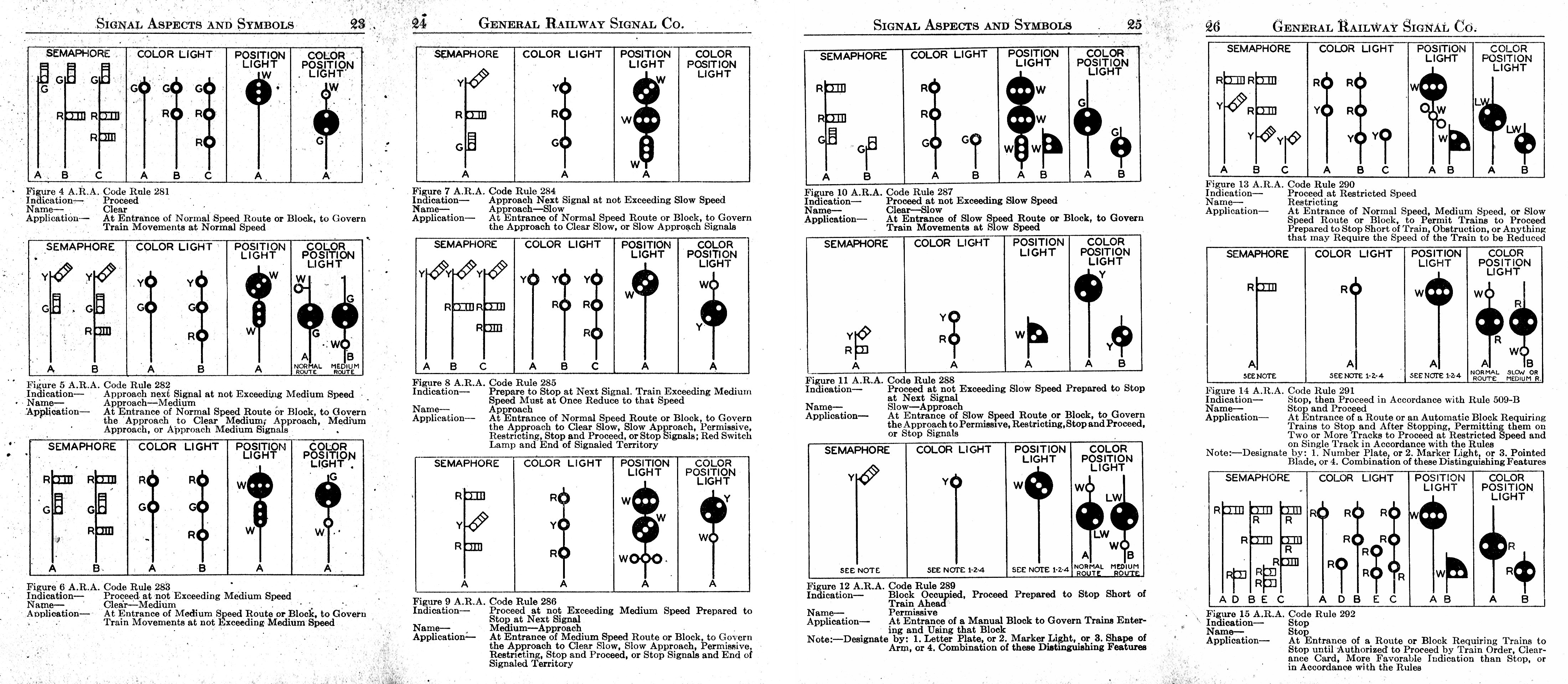
American Railway Association signal aspects, revision of October 1910

Most North American railroads have between 10 and 20 separate signal rules, each which are often represented by multiple aspects. However, all of these complicated rules revolve around the simple premise of informing the locomotive engineers how they are to operate their train in the present location, and what they are to expect at the next signal location. From here the large set of rules and aspects can be broken down into a small number of classes which are common to all North American signaling systems:

- Automatic Block – Block aspects convey basic track occupancy information and advise the engineer (operator) which of the basic signal rules (common to all railroads) to follow in the operation of the train at any point on the railway line. These include Clear (ARA Rule 281, see Figure), Advance Approach and Approach (Rule 285) which instruct the engineer to "expect no stop", "expect stop at second signal" and "expect stop at next signal" respectively. Advance approach is only used in situation with short signal blocks to ensure trains have enough stopping distance. These are the most common signal aspects in North America and are the only aspects most automatic block signals need to display.
- Approach at Speed – When a train needs to slow down due to dynamic conditions an "Approach Speed" aspect is used. These inform the engineer to slow to a prescribed speed by the next signal. The most common reason for this is that the train is to take a diverging, or non-normal-speed route at the next interlocking. Signals of this type include Approach Medium (ARA Rule 282, see Figure), Approach Limited, Approach Slow (Rule 285) and Approach Diverging. These signals are typically displayed on the distant signal to an interlocking, but can sometimes be used with short signal blocks in place of Advance Approach.
- Diverge to Clear – This class appears only on absolute signals and informs the engineer that the train will be taking a diverging route and need not expect a stop at the next signal. In speed signaling the engineer is informed of the speed the train needs to take the route at, in weak route signaling the engineer is just informed of a diverging route. Signals in this class include Medium Clear (ARA Rule 283, see Figure), Slow Clear (Rule 287), Limited Clear and Diverging Clear.
- Diverge to Stop – Same as above only the train can expect to stop at the signal after the interlocking. These signals include Medium Approach (ARA Rule 286, see Figure), Slow Approach (Rule 288) and Diverging Approach.
- Combination Signals – These combine functions of a "Diverge to" signal with an "Approach Speed" signal and occur in areas of complex trackwork where there are no intermediate signals between one interlocking and the next. In the United States only a few combination signals like Medium Approach Medium, Medium Approach Slow and Diverging Approach Medium/Slow are ever found in rulebooks and not frequently used in practice. The Canadian standard rulebook contains signal rules and aspects for every possible combination.
- Restricted Speed Signal – This class of signals is displayed for trains moving into a block where a track circuit has been de-energized or does not exist. A "shunted" track circuit indicates either the block is occupied by another train or railcar, or there is a problem such as a broken rail or flooded track. Where a track is not protected by track circuits, that track must be presumed to be occupied. As the name implies this signal requires trains to move at restricted speed, specifically with the ability to stop short of an obstruction. Restricted-speed signals take many forms including Restricted and Restricted Proceed (ARA Rule 290, see Figure) where trains must simply pass the signal at restricted speed and also Stop and Proceed (Rule 291), where a train must come to a complete stop before proceeding at restricted speed. Stop and Proceed has fallen out of favor with most freight railroads due to the fuel and time savings of allowing the trains to not come to a complete stop. This aspect class can be displayed on almost all railroads in North America.
- Stop Signal – Stop signals are displayed on absolute signals, in fact the ability to display an absolute Stop is part of that signal type's definition. Stop is the most important signal as passing a signal at Stop presents a serious risk of accident. Engineers committing a Stop-signal violation automatically have their Federal certification suspended and are frequently fired. Stop signals can be passed only upon special permission from a control authority.
- Cab Signaling Signals – Where cab signaling is employed without fixed trackside automatic signals, special signal aspects are required at absolute signals. These include some sort of absolute block "super clear" signal that allows passage to the next interlocking with a fixed signal and also the "cab speed" signal that informs the engineer to proceed under direction of cab signals.

=== Distant (approach) signals ===
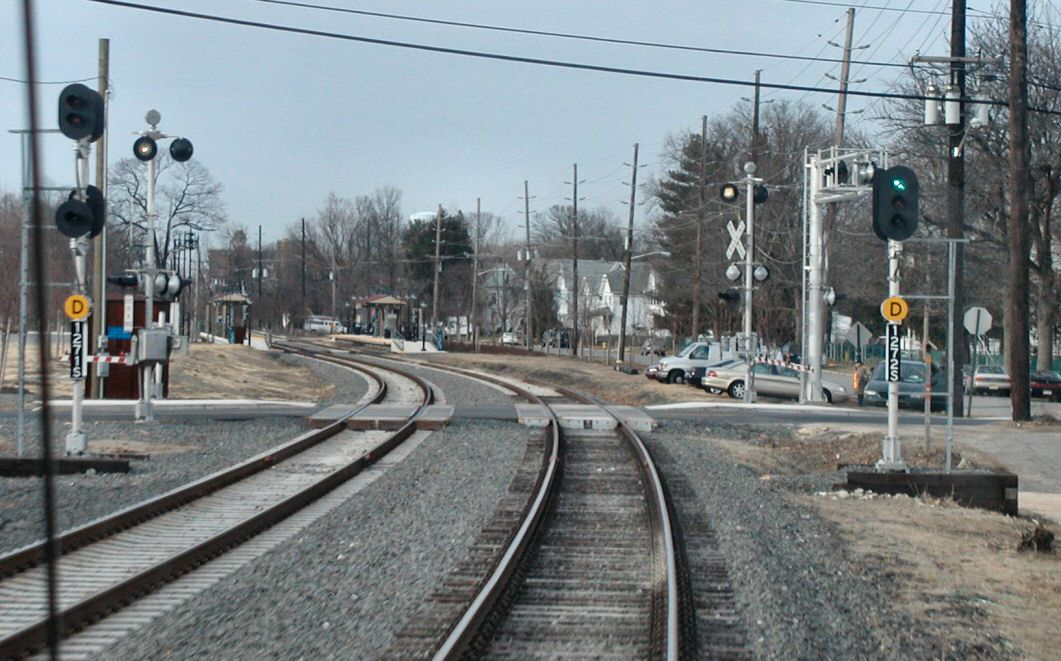
A pair of distant signals on the NJT RiverLINE light rail. The 'D' boards are placed in accordance with the NORAC "Distant Signal Rule".

Distant signals are often referred to as approach signals as the signal block before the interlocking is known as the approach block.

In the aftermath of the 1996 Maryland train collision, the Federal Railroad Administration amended its regulations for push-pull train operation to prevent locomotive engineers from forgetting that they were approaching a stop signal after making a station stop. The resulting "Delay in Block Rule" requires that all distant signals, located in territory where push-pull trains operate in the absence of cab signals, be marked with a "D" placard. The placard is intended to remind engineers that they are bound by a 40 mph (64 km/h) speed restriction, and must approach the interlocking signal prepared to stop, whenever a station stop is made or train speed drops below 10 mph (16 km/h) in the approach block. The restrictions hold until the interlocking signal is clearly visible and is displaying a "proceed" indication.

== See also ==
- Cab signalling
- Railway signalling
- Signalling block system

== Sources ==
- Armstrong, John (1957). "All About Signals." Two-article series. Trains Magazine, June and July 1957.
- "Canadian Railway Operating Rules - CROR Signal Aspects." 2010-02-01.
- Pennsylvania Railroad (1968). "Rules for conducting transportation." 1968-04-28
