= North American railroad signaling =

Railway signaling in North America

Standards for North American railroad signaling in the United States are issued by the Association of American Railroads (AAR), which is a trade association of the railroads of Canada, the US, and Mexico. Their system is loosely based on practices developed in the United Kingdom during the early years of railway development. However, North American practice diverged from that of the United Kingdom due to different operating conditions and economic factors between the two regions. In Canada, the Canadian Rail Operating Rules (CROR) are approved by the Minister of Transport under the authority of the Railway Safety Act. Each railway company or transit authority in Canada issues its own CROR rulebook with special instructions peculiar to each individual property. Among the distinctions are:

- The US has a much longer history of power operation of switches ("points" in UK parlance) and signals.
- The US and Canada departed from UK practice wherein a semaphore blade is devoted to each route (Route Signaling). General North American practice is to group routes by speeds and use a single blade for, say, "medium speed" regardless of the number of routes involved (Speed Signaling). The primary exception to this situation is in the field of heavy rapid transit, such as subways and elevated lines, which make use of a localization of the British practice, or a combination of the AAR and British systems. Some freight railroads also still use route signalling.

== History of railroad operating rules ==
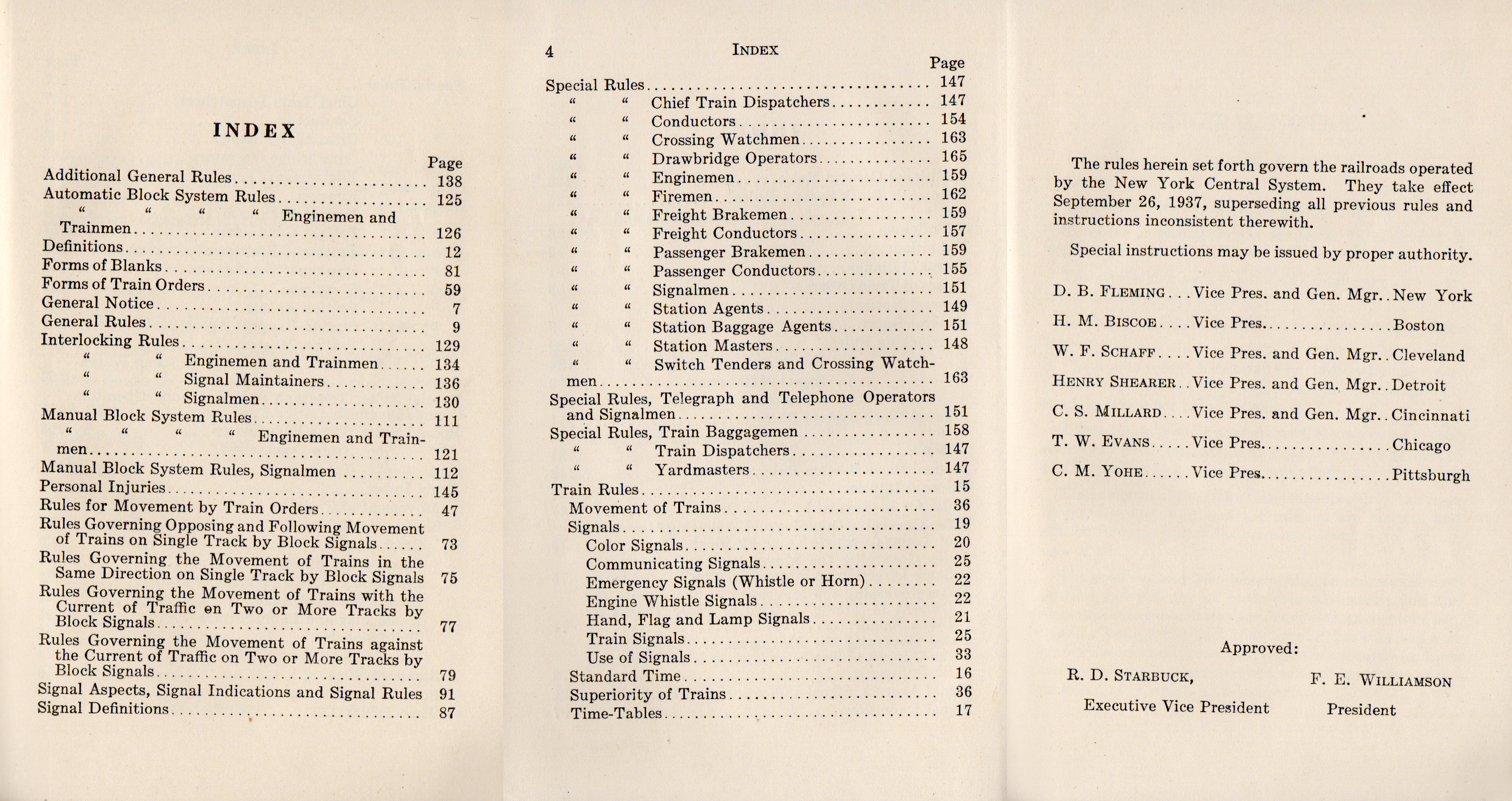
Contents of the Rules for the Government of the Operating Department for the New York Central System Effective 1937-09-26

In railroad operations, nearly every aspect of employee behavior is governed by operating rules. Employees who perform their jobs in an unsafe manner usually violate operating and safety rules. Human-factors related incidents are caused, or influenced by, unsafe work behavior and attitudes, as opposed to non-behavior related factors like inclement weather or undetected faulty track. Therefore, nearly all human-factor incidents and injuries can be associated with one or more operating or safety rule violations.

By the 1850s, railroad operating rules, often printed as pamphlets or on the back of a time card, had evolved to near universal application. On April 14, 1887 representatives of 48 railroads voted for the adoption of what is now known as the Standard Code of Operating Rules (SCOR), published by the AAR. Thus, all railroad rule books in North America today have as their foundation the SCOR in both development and application.

The SCOR, however, was never intended to be used as a working rulebook. Rather, its primary intention was to standardize operating practices to the extent practicable while still preserving the flexibility of individual railroads to either modify or omit rules at their discretion. Even rulebooks with identical phraseology could be interpreted and applied differently on different railroads. Although used as a reference book, the SCOR was primarily a matrix document, from which the industry could establish standard text and a common numbering system. Until recently, in fact, railroads rarely deviated from the original numbering system.

At present, most Class I railroads in the U.S. use one of two “standard” rulebooks: the Northeast Operating Rules Advisory Committee (NORAC) rulebook and the General Code of Operating Rules (GCOR). Conrail, Amtrak, and several commuter and short line railroads in the northeastern United States use the NORAC rulebook. The GCOR is used by every Class I railroad west of the Mississippi River, most of the Class II railroads, and numerous shortline railroads. A few railroads, including CSX, Norfolk Southern, Illinois Central, Metro North and Florida East Coast, have adopted their own rulebooks. In the case of NS and CSX, the NORAC Rulebook was integrated into their existing rulebook structure with the Conrail merger. Metro-North uses a rulebook based on NORAC. The Long Island Rail Road (LIRR) still uses a rule book that is based on the Standard Code of Operating Rules. Canadian railways use the CROR.

Research indicates unsafe work behavior can be influenced by any number of factors, including temperature, workload, time of day, and specific job tasks to name a few. Unsafe work behavior has also been linked to the organizational culture and to organizational processes. Consequently, before unsafe work behaviors in railroad operations can be reduced, some of the reasons employees do not comply with railroad operating rules must be understood. Also, there must be an understanding of some of the cultural components of rule compliance within the railroad system, particularly the development of railroad rules, and how that culture interacts with unsafe work behavior.

== Historic methods of operation ==
=== Timetable operation ===
All trains must have authority to occupy a main track. Originally possession of a timetable which showed a schedule for that train, authorized a train crew to take their movement onto the main track.

The simplest form of operation, in terms of equipment at least, was operation according to a schedule. Everything was laid down in advance and every train crew knew the timetable. Trains could only operate according to the scheduled time at each station for their train, during which they had exclusive "possession" of the track and no other train could operate on the same track. Trains typically were required to be "clear" of the mainline within five minutes of an opposing or following train's time at the next station. The timetable also specified (usually prominently on the first page) the superiority of trains by direction or class, for example, on most railroads an Eastward train was superior to a Westward train, and a First Class (passenger) train would be superior to a Fourth Class train (freight.) A superior train would normally hold the main track at meeting places, while the inferior train would take the siding on single track territory.

When trains were operating in opposing directions on a single-line railroad, meets were scheduled, where each train waited for the other at a point they could pass. Neither was permitted to move until the other had arrived.

The timetable system had several disadvantages. The first was that there was no positive confirmation that the track ahead was clear; only that it should be clear. This system did not allow for breakdowns and other such problems. The timetable was set up in such a way that there should be sufficient time between trains for the crew of a broken-down or delayed train to walk back up the line far enough to set up warning flags, fusees and explosive devices known as torpedoes, which alerted a train crew to an occupied track ahead.

The second problem was the timetable system's inflexibility; trains could not be added, delayed, or rescheduled without publishing and distributing a new timetable. Trains all down the line might have to stay clear of the main line, waiting for a train which never started from its initial station.

The third was a corollary of the second; the timetable system was inefficient. To give a little flexibility, the timetable gave trains a broad swath of time to allow for some delay. Thus, the line was possessed by the train for much longer than was really necessary.

Nonetheless, this system permitted operation on a vast scale, with no requirements for any kind of communication that travelled faster than a train. Timetable operation was the normal mode of operation on North American railroads in the early days.

=== Timetable and train order ===
With the advent of the telegraph, a more sophisticated system became possible, since the telegraph provided the first system available where messages could be transmitted faster than the trains themselves. The telegraph allowed the dissemination of alterations to the timetable, known as train orders. These overrode the timetable, allowing the cancellation, rescheduling and addition of trains, and almost anything else. Sufficient time had to be given, however, so that all train crews could receive the changed orders.

Train crews generally received the orders at the next station at which they stop, although sometimes orders were handed up to a locomotive "on the run" via a long staff or hoop. Train orders allowed train dispatchers to set up meets at sidings, force a train to wait at a siding for a priority train to pass from behind, and to keep at least one block spacing between trains going the same direction. Train orders could also reverse the superiority of trains, or give extra or inferior trains rights over superior trains in order to accommodate abnormal operating conditions.

In North American railway traffic control, a Form 19 or 31 train order would modify their schedule. An order which did not require a train to stop was called a "Y" (yellow) train order. The operator at the station would display a Yellow signal, which would cause the train to slow down so that they could receive the train order from a hoop from the operator. These commonly gave crews information about track speed (in areas where tracks and bridges needed repair) and were called "slow orders" by train crews. An "R" (red) order told the station operator to display a red (stop) signal, and dealt with meets, waits and other important traffic control issues, it was necessary for the crews to stop because they often had to sign for them, indicating that they had read and understood the situation. Orders were flagged at train stations by telegraph operators who signaled using a fixed "order board", which usually consisted of a single semaphore blade mounted over the operator's position in the station. The operator usually had to confirm to the dispatcher that the requested Y or R signal had been displayed properly before the dispatcher could issue further instructions to other trains or engines concerning that movement.

Timetable and train order operation was commonly used on American railroads until the 1960s, including some quite large operations such as the Wabash Railroad and the Nickel Plate Road. Train order traffic control was used in Canada until the late 1980s on the Algoma Central Railway and some spurs of the Canadian Pacific Railway. On CN's Deux-Montagnes commuter line, this system lasted on part of the route until the total replacement of signaling and catenary in 1995. The orders were notable for being bilingual.

Timetable and train order was not used widely outside North America and has been phased out in favor of radio dispatching on many light-traffic lines and electronic signals on higher-traffic lines. The only railroads currently still using authentic train order operations is the South Shore line in Indiana and the LIRR in New York.

== Modern signaling in the U.S. and Canada ==
U.S. railroads have historically used a far greater variety of signaling systems than other countries. There have never been national standards for signal appearance and operation, so each of the hundreds of rail lines developed its own signaling techniques.

As Trains magazine describes:

This was no problem as long as crews stayed on home territory. But as roads merged, split, and spun off new short lines, and tenant operators such as Amtrak and regional commuter systems came into existence, train crews could find themselves on several different properties in the course of a work week.

The creation of Conrail in 1976 out of the remains of a half-dozen bankrupt railroads only made things worse. It was hard enough to rationalize the systems of the constituent companies, let alone interact with other operators over the dense Northeastern U.S. rail network.

After several years, the situation had become intolerable. Training costs were getting out of hand, because crews had to qualify separately on each road over which they might operate. Having to consult half a dozen rulebooks increased enormously the potential for a disastrous mistake.

As railroad companies eventually began to standardize their rule books via industry-wide committees, the implementation of signal systems between railroads became, if not standardized, at least more similar. Different legacy systems still in use, however, mean that some signal indications can be shown in several different ways.

Within the United States, each railroad operator formulates its own operating practices, subject to the regulations in Title 49 Part 236 of the Code of Federal Regulations). However, there are two major groups of railroads that have adopted common operating practices and therefore a common operating rule book. Major railroads on the East Coast have adopted the NORAC rules. Most railroads west of the Mississippi River, as well as the U.S. operations of the Canadian Pacific Railway, use the GCOR. Some large U.S. railroads, including CSX, Norfolk Southern, and the U.S. portion of the Canadian National do not subscribe to either NORAC or CROR and still use their own rule books.

The NORAC rule book illustrates all signal aspects and indications which may appear on track operated by member railroads. However, GCOR does not illustrate signal aspects and indications because of the lack of uniformity between the participating railroads. Signal aspect and indication illustrations instead appear in each railroad's system special instructions or operating timetable for the region or division where the aspects and indications apply. This practice is necessary due to the lack of uniformity in aspects between the multitude of railroads participating in GCOR, which includes a number of large systems created through merger.

All railways operating within Canada, including Canadian Pacific, Canadian National, and up until recently, BC Rail, use the Canadian Rail Operating Rules (CROR). These rules are discussed within the forum of the Railway Association of Canada, which makes recommendations for changes to the Minister of Transport of Canada who then approves the rules issued by each company. Canadian Rule Books contain all hand signals, voice signals and flag signals as well as fixed trackside signal indications necessary for operation.

These rule books specify various methods of operation in both signalled territory and dark territory, where manual methods of granting track authority must be used.

== North American train control systems ==
In North America, train operation over any specific section of track is governed by a specific set of rules in the railroad company's rulebook. The rules and sections differ from company to company, but they all cover the same basic modes of operations.

=== Restricted speed operation ===
Restricted speed or line of sight operation implies that trains control themselves so that they can come to a stop within half the range of the engineer's vision or line of sight. There are many types of restricted speed operations with slight variations, such as yard limit rules or industrial track rules depending on specific operational circumstances. They all have the same basic working theory, that two trains, approaching head on, will each be able stop upon seeing one another. Restricted speed operation generally works with a maximum speed of 15 or 20 mph (24 or 32 km/h) and a typical speed governed by length of train and visual conditions.

=== Absolute or manual block ===
Manual block systems work by dividing a rail line into predefined "blocks", which are typically demarcated by fixed signs. Authority to occupy a block is granted by some sort of central controller, usually a dispatcher, who has the sole authority to grant such access. Before the widespread adoption of radio communications on trains, authority to occupy a block, along with other instructions, were communicated to trains much as timetable train orders with station agents and trackside telephones. Some railroads, notably the Pennsylvania Railroad (PRR), had a system of manual block signals activated by wayside operators in stations or interlocking towers eliminating the need for some trains to stop. This manual block system is still on use on the Long Island Rail Road, which had been a subsidiary of the PRR.

With the introduction of radio communications, this information could be directly transmitted to the crews. There are several different flavours of this system, but they all share in common a system of blocks, a safe way to grant access to those blocks and a standardized system of paperwork to eliminate confusion for both the crews and the dispatcher.

These types of manual signaling systems typically fulfill the FRA's "signaling system" requirement for trains to exceed 60 mph (97 km/h).

Here are some of the more common systems.

Track Warrant Control
In Track Warrant Control, or TWC, the train dispatcher issues "track warrants" via radio that authorize the train between two specified limits. The limits are often mileposts or stations. The track warrant may authorize a train to proceed to a station and "clear the main" or enter a siding so an oncoming train can pass. Generally, no more than one train or piece of equipment may be given the same or overlapping limits of authority, unless the movements will be made at restricted speed. While TWC is generally used in dark territory, it may be combined with ABS to enable more than one train to be given the same authority (although this generally applies only to trains moving in the same direction). This reduces the workload of the dispatcher and train crew, as new track warrants do not need to be copied every few minutes to ensure that following trains are not delayed due to running out of authority. In Canada, a clearance is the equivalent to a track warrant.
Direct Traffic Control
Direct Traffic Control, or DTC, is similar to TWC, except that the rail line is divided into predefined blocks—somewhat similar to ABS blocks without the signals—and dispatchers authorize trains to proceed in a specified number of blocks. Only one train may occupy a stretch of authority (which may consist of a single block or a stretch of dozens) at any given time, unless movements are to be made at restricted speed. Like TWC, DTC may be combined with ABS in high-traffic areas to aid with train separation and safety.
Form D Control
Form D Control System, or DCS, is a system similar to Track Warrant Control that is used by railroads subscribing to NORAC (Track Warrant Control is a GCOR term). The name comes from the form that train crews copy the authority onto. A sample Form D is available here; line two is used to grant authority for occupying the track.
Clearance Card Form K Control
This is a form commonly used on railroads such as the LIRR which base its rules on the SCOR. At locations where a "block-limit signal" is displayed in place of a fixed manual block signal, train crews obtain a Clearance Card Form K over the radio or telephone from the operator in charge of that territory, which allows that train to pass that Block-Limit as though it displayed a "clear-block". A clear block is a condition where a particular block or predetermined length of track is clear of all trains. In addition to the condition of the block ahead, The Standard Code of Operating Rules, such as those still in use on the LIRR, gives one train "superiority" over "inferior" trains. The "superior" train has right-of-track over the "inferior" trains. To move the "inferior" train against a "superior" train, train orders are used to govern the movement. On this railroad, a compilation of train rules such as superiority, and block rules such as a "clear-block" is used to proceed on the main track.
Centralized Traffic Control (CTC)
In Canada, fully signalled lines use CTC, where signal indication is the authority for movement. This system is supervised by a rail traffic controller (RTC), who is in continual communication with the trains and engines on his territory. The RTC can line routes and give permissive signal requests to the system in the field from a central location. The RTC can also issue special permissions to trains via radio. To pass signals set at stop (Rule 564), reverse direction within a block (Rule 577) or enter the main line at a manual switch not equipped with a signal (Rule 568), the train crew must copy the RTC's instructions and repeat them back correctly before being allowed to proceed.
Occupancy Control System (OCS)
In Canada, non-signalled and Automatic Block Signal (ABS) territories are operated according to OCS rules. The only authority for movement in OCS territory is possession of a clearance or track occupancy permit (TOP). While the line might be equipped with signals (ABS), these signals are unsupervised and uncontrolled by the RTC. Their indications are strictly governed by track conditions and the passage of trains, and tell operating crews at what speed to operate, and warn of an occupied track ahead.

=== Basic Automatic Block Signals ===
See Automatic Block Signal

=== Signaling enhancements ===
Cab signaling Systems or CSS (also known as Automatic Cab Signaling/Automatic Speed Control, or ACS), is often used as an overlay for ABS, Rule 251 and CTC. This system provides train crews with information about the next signal indication, even if the signal mast is not visible. Automatic Train Stop, or ATS, systems provide wayside inductors that, when activated, alert the engineer that the train has passed a signal other than clear and if the signal is not acknowledged the train's brakes will be applied. Automatic Train Control, or ATC, adds in-cab enforcement to these and will apply the brakes if a dangerous situation arises, such as when the next signal is displaying a stop indication but the engineer has not begun slowing the train. Some form of ATS or ATC is required on all U.S. rail lines that operate at 80 mph (130 km/h) or more.

In the 1990s, communication-based train control (CBTC) systems started to be used in rail transit systems. These systems utilize radio communications between train and wayside equipment to perform the functions of the signaling system. More recently, CBTC systems have been deployed on mainline railroads, and Interoperable Communications Based Signaling (ICBS) systems are being developed to provide standard system functionality among railroads and suppliers signaling systems.

A further enhancement designed to work in both signaled and dark territory is Positive Train Control (PTC). This system is an overlay on the conventional methods of operation but also uses satellite-based tracking and computerized radio communication to verify the authority given to the train, current location of the train, the status of the next signal (if any), the position of switches (which will be equipped with a sensor and radio transmitter), and the location of any oncoming trains. As in ATC, if a dangerous situation arises, the system will apply the brakes. PTC was implemented on most of the U.S. national rail network mileage by 2020 or earlier.

== Effect of mergers on signaling and operating rules ==
Mergers of major railroad companies in recent years resulted not only in the merging of different railroad lines and operating rulebooks, but also in the merging of railroad cultures and operating practices. Superficially, it may appear that most railroads have adopted a common code of operating rules, but major differences still exist in the application, and consequently, the compliance with these operating rules. Moreover, different management styles often clash when organizational cultures merge, as documented in the case of the Penn Central merger in 1968 and the Burlington Northern Santa Fe merger in 1995. This leaves operating rules managers uncertain as to how specific rules should be applied on their newly formed railroad. Different management philosophies may also influence different compliance standards across railroads.

As railroad operating environments become increasingly complex – from mergers, new technology, and other external forces – operating rules will continue to change in both number and frequency. The number of operating rules and procedures that employees must now commit to memory is substantial. With fewer employees to handle the same workload, individuals may no longer have the time to look up rules when performing their duties, perhaps further complicating both their ability and their desire to comply with these rules.

For years, the FRA has been recommending the standardization of operating rules and practices for cost-effectiveness in both safety and efficiency. In 1992, the American Association of Railroad Superintendents (AARS) convened a special committee, which suggested to its board of directors, executive council, and membership that “the AARS sponsor a full conference on the standardization of railroad operating rules, practices, and procedures, and that this conference be conducted on the highest level possible, with the full and complete endorsement and involvement of chief operating officers.” A standard set of operating rules, it was argued, would minimize the confusion that exists when employees operate over joint lines and are governed by two rule books instead of one. Of particular concern are situations where different operating rules govern identical, or similar, signal aspects on different railroads.

Some railroad operating officials believe standardized railroad operating rules would have a positive impact on the railroad industry in fundamental and important ways, including:

- increasing the mobility and ease of transition for both railroad employees and managers when transferring from one railroad to another;
- reducing training costs and operating rule development;
- improving safety practices when railroads and railroad rule books merge; and
- improving the overall railroad delivery system across interchange points, regions, and yards.

In response to pressures for standardization, the railroads governed by both NORAC and GCOR recently hired consultants to rewrite and reorganize their operating rulebooks. Two major benefits are expected from these new versions of the operating rule book: 1) an improvement in the clarity and understanding of operating rules, and 2) an improvement in the ability of an employee to look up unfamiliar operating rules.

The extent to which these and other benefits have been obtained, however, is uncertain. Even if the revised rule books enhance the clarity and understanding of operating rules, other important questions still remain. Given a factual understanding, how well are employees able to conceptually apply the rules? How often do operating employees purposely violate rules, even when they understand them and know how to apply them? What influences operating employees to knowingly violate operating rules? How often do rule violations lead to incidents or injuries that otherwise could have been prevented?

Some railroad operating officials urge that both GCOR and NORAC should be used as the SCOR was originally used. They say operating rule books should be used as a basic guide to standardizing operating practices, while still preserving the flexibility of individual railroads to either modify or omit rules at their discretion. If standard operating rules are not needed, the major question that remains is whether or not a process has been established for maintaining quality in operating rule development. This is especially important with the implementation of constantly changing equipment and train control technology, which will force the need for more rapid rule changes. Therefore, the question that must be asked is whether or not guidelines are needed for the development, writing, testing, application, and representation of operating rules. What kinds of guidelines should be developed, if at all? If necessary, what should be the process for developing those guidelines? For this purpose, a focus group was assembled.

== See also ==
- Signalling block system

== Sources ==
- John Armstrong, "All About Signals" (Two-article series). Trains Magazine, June and July 1957.
