= Hitachi Rail STS =

Transportation company

- Formerly: Ansaldo STS (2006)
- Type: Subsidiary
- ISIN: IT0003977540
- Industry: Engineering
- Predecessor: Gio. Ansaldo & C. and Hitachi Rail Italy
- Founded: 2006; 20 years ago
- Headquarters: Naples, Italy
- Key people: Luca D'Aquila (Chairman)
- Services: Railway signalling and control systems, railway design, engineering and maintenance
- Revenue: €2,956 million (2025)
- Operating income: €118.5 million (2018)
- Net income: €348.9 million (2025)
- Number of employees: 4,574 (2026)
- Parent: Hitachi
- Subsidiaries: Union Switch & Signal (1988–2009)
- Website: hitachirail.com

Hitachi Rail STS SpA (from Hitachi Rail Signalling and Transportation Systems), formerly Ansaldo STS, is an Italian transportation company owned by Hitachi with a global presence in the field of railway signalling and integrated transport systems for passenger traffic (railway/mass transit) and freight operations. Hitachi Rail STS plans, designs, manufactures, installs and commissions signaling systems, components and technologies for the management and control of newly built or upgraded railways, transit and freight lines worldwide.

Headquartered in Naples, Italy, it is a wholly owned subsidiary of Hitachi Rail. It was previously listed on the Borsa Italiana and was a component of the benchmark FTSE Italia Mid Cap Index.

Providing design, manufacture, installation, integration and maintenance of a wide range of train control systems and equipment, Hitachi Rail STS employs 4,574 people as of 2026.

== History ==
=== 1853–2006: Ancestor companies ===
The company’s namesake comes from the Italian company Gio. Ansaldo & C., which was founded in 1853 in Genoa, Italy by Giovanni Ansaldo. Gio. Ansaldo & C. began as a steam locomotive producer, which diversified into shipbuilding and electrical and nuclear energy production.

In 1881, the US company Union Switch & Signal (US&S) was founded by George Westinghouse in Pittsburgh, Pennsylvania from the assets of the Interlocking Switch & Signal Company (interlocking controls) and the Union Electric Signal Company. The latter was founded by the American engineer and inventor William Robinson, the father of track circuit systems. In 1988 US&S was acquired by Ansaldo STS, operating independently until 2009, when it became "Ansaldo STS USA", the North American subsidiary of Ansaldo.

In Europe, Ansaldo STS expanded acquiring the French company Compagnie des Signaux pour Chemins de fer (CSE) in 1996. Founded in 1902 by Fernand Cumont with the support of the financial group Empain, CSE built the first lines of the Paris metro: the maintenance of these lines continues until today. In 1920 CSE (independent since 1912) was renamed into Company and Business Electrical Signals (CSEE), concentrating on rail signaling and electrical manufacturing, contributing to create SAGEM and later (1996) entering in the Ansaldo Signal group.

In 1993 the parent company Ansaldo SpA was merged into the Finmeccanica holding, a state-owned entity privatized during the same year. In 2001, Ansaldo SpA’s transportation business was separated and divided into three companies: AnsaldoBreda (rolling stock manufacturer); Ansaldo Segnalamento Ferroviario (signaling and rail traffic control automation); Ansaldo Trasporti Sistemi Ferroviari (transport systems design construction and maintenance). Ansaldo Segnalamento Ferroviario became the parent company of Ansaldo Signal (railway signalling), the owner of Union Switch & Signal and CSEE.

=== 2006–2019: Ansaldo STS ===
The company was founded as "Ansaldo STS" in 2006 through the merger of Ansaldo Trasporti Sistemi Ferroviari and Ansaldo Signal. It began trading on the Milan Stock exchange, with 60% of its shares publicly held and 40% owned by Finmeccanica S.p.A. Both companies had their roots in the Ansaldo engineering conglomerate which was gradually absorbed by Finmeccanica. Ansaldo Trasporti Sistemi Ferroviari was created in 2000, acquiring certain units of Ansaldo Trasporti (which had been fully integrated into Finmeccanica) the following year. The creation of Ansaldo STS was followed by a partial IPO in March 2006.

On 24 February 2015 Hitachi acquired Finmeccanica’s 51% shareholding and initiated a tender offer for the remaining shares of the company. In the occasion of the Ordinary General Shareholders’ Meeting on 2 November, Hitachi Rail Italy Investment completed the acquisition of the 40% of the share capital of Ansaldo STS. During the first meeting of the new board of directors, chaired by Alistair Dormer, Stefano Siragusa was confirmed as chief executive officer and general manager of the company, with the powers to manage the company and the group.

In March 2015, after the public tender offer launch on the society and after the purchase of other shares at 10.5 euros each, Hitachi Rail Italy Investments arrived at 50.7% of the share capital. Hitachi has a long term goal of integrating the company to provide a range of cars and signaling products and a manufacturing footprint in Europe.

Stefano Siragusa, chief executive officer and general manager of the company, resigned on 31 March 2016 and remained in charge until 13 May 2016 when, on the occasion of the shareholders’ general meeting the new board of directors were elected. On 24 May, the new Board appointed Andrew Barr as the new chief executive officer and general manager of Ansaldo STS. Andrew Barr was also granted the operational powers necessary for the management of the company and the group.

In October 2018, Hitachi agreed to buy Elliot Management's remaining 32% shareholding. Hitachi subsequently made a takeover offer for the remaining shares. On 22 January 2019 Hitachi announced it had gained a 99% shareholding.

=== 2019–present: Hitachi Rail STS ===
Ansaldo STS was officially delisted from Borsa Italiana and renamed Hitachi Rail STS on 30 January 2019.

In 2024, Hitachi Rail and MERMEC signed a put option agreement for the sale of Hitachi Rail’s main line signalling business in France and its signalling business units in Germany and the UK.

== Operations ==
The company's operations are split into two divisions: Freight Rail and Passenger Railway / Mass Transit. Major projects involving Hitachi Rail STS and its predecessor companies include the Copenhagen Metro, where it is responsible for the provision of rolling stock, Automatic Train Control, SCADA and other services; and signalling on LGV Est in France and High Speed 1 in the United Kingdom. The company also managed projects for signalling, train control and/or maintenance for the Metro systems of Paris, Los Angeles, Rome, Milan, Hong Kong, Naples, Shenyang, India, and Thessaloniki.

=== High-speed rail ===
Hitachi Rail STS commissioned the first high-speed rail signaling system (TVM) for the first LGV line in France, in 1981, connecting Paris and Lyon. In 2005, Hitachi Rail STS set another landmark with the first high speed line running on ERTMS Level 2 (European Rail Traffic Management System) between Rome and Naples, Italy.

As of 2013 over half of all high speed lines worldwide (excluding Japan) are equipped with Hitachi Rail STS signaling.

=== Main lines and freight ===
In Europe, the company played a key role in the development and upgrade of ERTMS (level 1 and 2), leading to the interoperability of different countries' rail networks.

In the United States Hitachi Rail STS has supported the freight rail industry, dating back over 130 years. Hitachi Rail STS has products and systems with every Class I railroad in North America.

In Australia Hitachi Rail STS has been in business for more than 20 years and has most recently developed automated train management technology (AutoHaul) to support fully autonomous heavy-haul, long-distance rail systems and advanced signalling and telecommunications systems featuring satellite positioning, data radio & WiMax.

=== Mass transit ===
Hitachi Rail STS's transit control systems build upon traditional signaling technology, i.e.:

Communications Based Train Control (CBTC)
A continuous, two way radio-based communication between wayside and carborne controllers used to determine train position and enforce movement authorities. The communication between adjacent zones, interlockings and carborne controllers supports safe optimized headways and maximizes system capacity.
Driverless Automatic Train Control (ATC)
Driverless ATC. Hitachi Rail STS delivered the first fully driverless train control equipment to be certified under the strict European Cenelec safety standards on the Copenhagen (Denmark) Metro in 2002, winning subsequent contracts in Rome, Milan, Brescia, Thessaloniki, Riyadh, Taipei, and Honolulu.
Conventional metros and light rail
Hitachi Rail STS provides technology for traditional track circuit profile-based metro systems to "drive-on-sight" street running light rail systems to the major urban centers across the United States, Europe and other countries.

=== Planning and supervision ===
Computer Aided Dispatching (CAD) system was developed by Union Switch & Signal at the Union Railroad Company in Duquesne, Pennsylvania, in 1966 starting the computer-aided dispatching in the industry.

Today Hitachi Rail STS adopts the Optimizing Traffic Planner as a late successor of the 1966 CAD. OTP is an advanced planning engine that solves complex logistics problems under changing operating conditions to maximize capacity and increase average velocity. Computational agents respond in real-time to updated CAD and field data, issuing new movement plans that account for current conditions and all operating rules and constraints.

Applied off-line, OTP can minimize inherent conflict within a new timetable before the timetable is used in service. Applied on-line, OTP can produce significant capacity gains across a large freight oriented network.

=== Components ===
The company provides on-board and wayside components and systems, such as interlocking (MicroLok II), track circuits, switch machines (M-style), traditional and LED signals, Eurobalise, vital relays, hot wheel detectors, highway crossing mechanisms.

== See also ==
- Hitachi Rail Italy
