= Hall Signal Company =

American manufacturer of railway signaling equipment

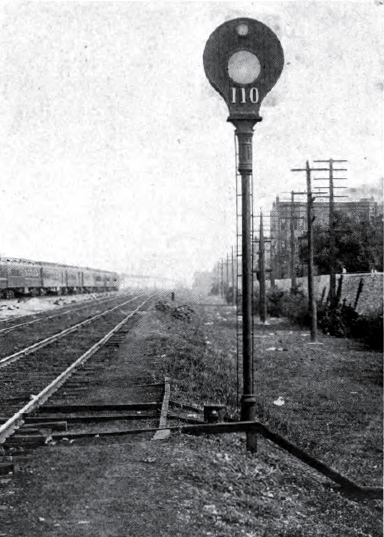
Disc signal manufactured by Hall Signal Company

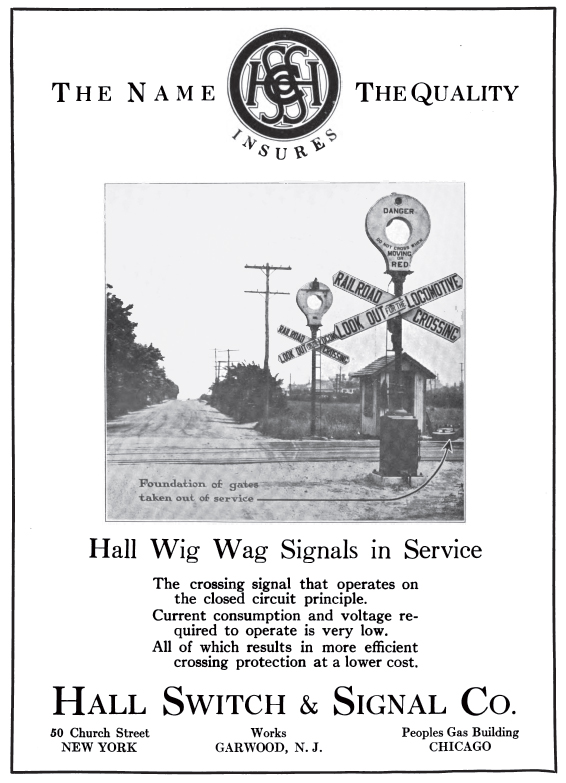
A 1916 advertisement for a Hall wigwag grade crossing signal

The Hall Signal Company was an American manufacturer of railway signaling equipment in the 19th and 20th centuries. Hall's equipment was widely used by American railroad companies. The company's founder, William Phillips Hall, was an inventor who developed several important devices in the history of railway signalling. The company manufactured automatic block signaling systems, disc signals (also called "banjo" signals), a rotating semaphore signal, grade crossing signals, and the first searchlight-style signal.

The company was established in 1871 with main offices in New York City and a factory in Meriden, Connecticut. In 1892 it built a new, larger factory in Garwood, New Jersey. The company reorganized in 1912 to raise capital and expand its Garwood factory. In 1925 Hall Signal Co. was purchased by Union Switch and Signal, principally for the value of its searchlight signal patents.

== See also ==
- North American railroad signals
