= William Phillips Hall =

American inventor (1864–1939)

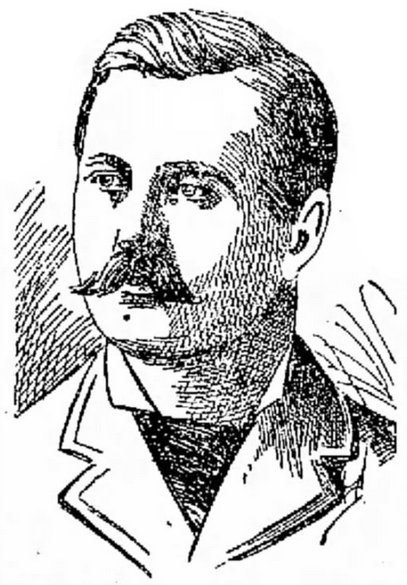
- Hall in 1896
- Born: February 1, 1864; Stamford, Connecticut, U.S.
- Died: August 15, 1937 (aged 73); Wallingford, Connecticut, U.S.
- Occupation: Railroad engineer
- Known for: inventor of railroad signals
- Political party: Republican
- Spouse: Charlotte Sophia Hollister
- Children: 13
- Parent(s): Thomas Seavey Hall; Sarah Katherine (Phillips) Hall

William Phillips Hall (February 1, 1864 – August 15, 1937) was a lay evangelist, railroad transportation executive, and electrical engineer. He founded the Hall Signal Company, headquartered in New York City, and invented signal mechanisms to improve railroad safety. He was involved with many other companies worldwide related to the railroad industry, and participated in various new reform and religious movements.

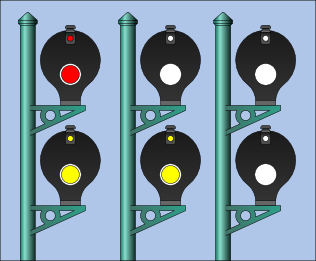
Hall Banjo style disc signals

== Early life ==
Hall was born in Stamford, Connecticut, on February 1, 1864. He went to the local public school and, after graduating from high school, was supplemented by a college preparation course, although he never entered college. In his youth he learned the trade of electrical machinist.

== Midlife and business career ==
Hall followed in his father's footsteps, invented railroad signal mechanisms, and started the Hall Signal Company in 1889. Hall was president of the company headquartered in New York City with offices in Chicago and London. Railroad traffic in the city of Chicago during the six months of the 1893 Chicago World's Fair contained 19,500,000 passengers, but there were no accidents with Hall's system of signals installed on the Illinois Central railroad.

By the age of 47, Hall was a director of several large corporations including the New York Real Estate Security Company, the Long Island Assembly, and the Continental Hall Signal Company of Brussels, Belgium. He was also a member of the American Railway Signal Association, the American Railway Appliance Association, the New York Board of Trade and Transportation, and the Board of Trade of Greenwich, Connecticut.

== Religious career ==
Hall's father and maternal grandfather were both preachers. Hall followed in their footsteps and worked as a lay preacher and religious writer in addition to his work in the railroad industry.

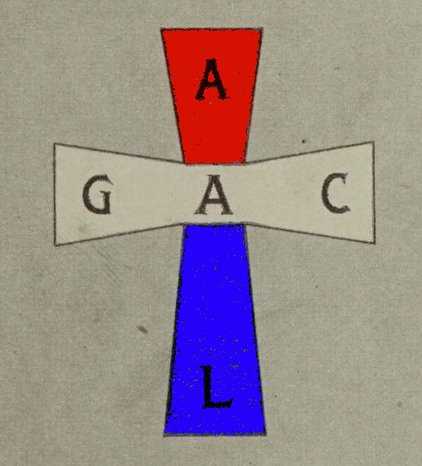
American League of the Grand Army of the Cross emblem.

Hall organized a new evangelistic movement in 1896. It was known as the American League of the Grand Army of the Cross. The first branch of this new religious organization was unofficially developed in March and officially formed at Stamford on April 12. The name was sometimes shortened to Army of the Cross. The goal was to reach 50% of the people that were not associated with any other church. It was structured like the Salvation Army and Volunteers of America, although no uniforms were used. There was talk of the movement joining forces with Ballington Booth, but this never came to fruition. The leaders bore military titles like captain, general, colonel, and lieutenant. The scheme of organization included league companies under the direction of a president captain and vice president lieutenant placed in every evangelical church. These companies were structured into regiments and brigades, commanded by president colonels and generals. Every regiment was expected to train and equip a brass band from its own individual membership. People from any denomination of any church were welcomed. The motive of the organization was aggressive evangelism as an auxiliary force to regular church work. Hall's organization proposed to work with all beliefs and intended not to antagonize any sect, church, or belief. The emblem of the organization was a silver cross in red, white, and blue, bearing the organization's letters. Each member of the new organization was expected to wear a pin or button in the shape of the Maltese style cross. Hall's army was nonsectarian, and all people were invited to join the organization; however, those that did not belong to a church had to attach themselves to some religious organization within two months to become a soldier of the Grand Army of the Cross.

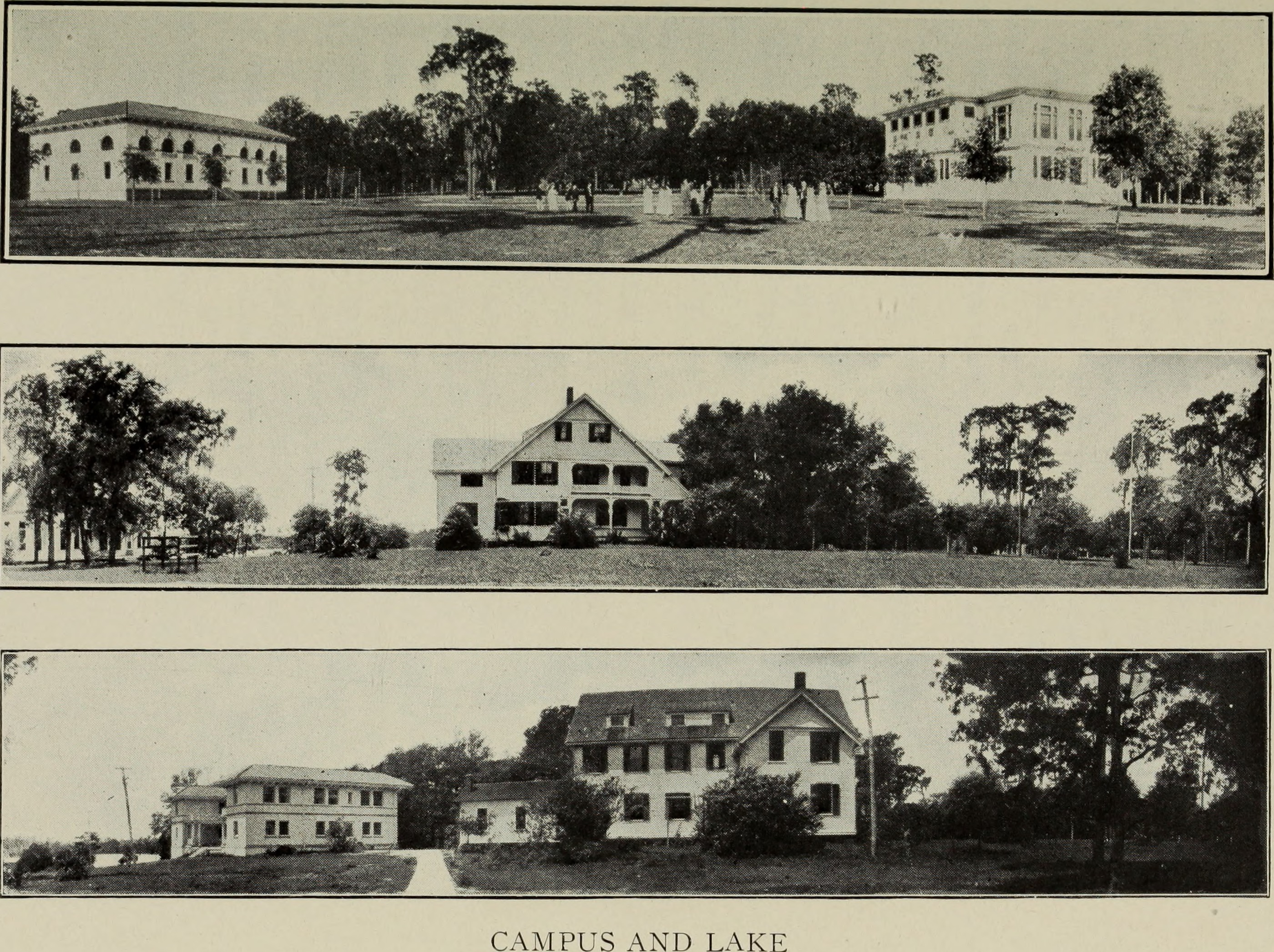
The Rollins College in 1914

Hall was very involved with local communities, founding the Twentieth Century Gospel Campaign in 1900 and becoming chairman of its national central committee. By 1911, he was a trustee of the Rollins College of Winter Park, Florida; trustee of the United Society Christian Endeavor, president of the American Bible Society, and manager of the Methodist Episcopal Hospital of Brooklyn.

== Personal life ==
Hall was six feet tall with an athlete build. He married Charlotte Sophia Hollister, daughter of Elisha S. and Adeline E. Hollister of Cornwall Bridge, Connecticut on October 4, 1887. He was a Republican.

Hall was influenced by Dwight Moody, a close friend, to become an evangelist. He was known by the Hartford Courant newspaper and The Bangor Daily News as the "business millionaire evangelist". He was considered the richest evangelist in the world at the last part of the 19th century.

After retirement, Hall primarily wrote and published his own Biblical stories and religious materials. He died at the age of 73 on August 15, 1937. He is buried at Putnam Cemetery in Greenwich, Connecticut.

== Sources ==
- Cutter, William Richard (1912). Genealogical History of State of Connecticut. Lewis Historical Publishing Company. OCLC 987944947.
- Hamersly, L. R. (1910). Men & women of America; biographical dictionary. L.R. Hamersly & Company.
- Herringshaw, Thomas William (1914). Herringshaw's American Blue Book Biography. American Publishers' Association. OCLC 245536893.
- Leslie, Frank (1898). Frank Leslie's Illustrated Newspaper, V 86. Frank Leslie Company.
