= Interoperable Communications Based Signaling =

Train protection system in United States

Interoperable Communications Based Signaling (ICBS) is an initiative backed by the Federal Railroad Administration to enhance interoperability and signaling procurement in the railway system of the United States by creating a single national standard for train control and command systems. The concept was launched in 2005 and an interoperable prototype system was successfully demonstrated in January 2009.

== Background ==
In North America, there is little operating consistency between railroads; each has its own signaling system, operating rules and equipment. When trains must traverse territory under the control of more than one railroad company, they usually must stop and change crews and equipment at each boundary between railroads.

In Europe, similar situations have existed in that trains must change as they move from one country to another. This is being addressed with European Rail Traffic Management System (ERTMS) and European Train Control System (ETCS) systems, which enhance interoperability.

== Companies ==
Companies developing ICSB systems include Alstom, Ansaldo STS, GE Transportation Systems and Safetran. Alstom and Ansaldo STS have also developed ERTMS systems in Europe.

== Timeline ==
=== 2005 ===
- Fall: Railroads ask the American Railway Engineering and Maintenance-of-Way Association (AREMA) to define an interoperable radio-based cab signal system. AREMA assigns this task to AREMA Committee 37.

=== 2006 ===
- AREMA Committee 37 meets to draft ICBS sections for the AREMA manual.

=== 2007 ===
- September: FRA obtains a $500,000 grant administered Railroad Research Foundation for a lab demonstration of ICBS.
- October: GE Transportation Systems, Safetran and Ansaldo STS (US&S) release draft manual parts for ICBS.
- November: The FRA Office of Research and Development and the Railroad Research Foundation (RRF) finalize a Cooperative Agreement ( DTFR53-07-H-00005)to allow for system demonstration through a lab test; and to verify the interoperability specifications provided in the AREMA Manual Parts. Critical Link of Syracuse, New York begins work on Simulators and the demonstration test environment.
- December: Kickoff meeting for a demonstration is held in Syracuse.

=== 2008 ===
- January: Alstom agrees to participate in the demonstration.
- March: AREMA Committee 37 approves the AREMA Manual parts.
- May: Status of the demonstration is presented at the Institution of Railway Signal Engineers North American Section Annual General Meeting in Grapevine, Texas.
- August: Basic demonstration system is operational. This includes simulators, test drivers and the Safetran Wayside Appliance and Signaling Logic Processor subsystems.
- September: Status of the demonstration is presented at the AREMA Annual Technical Conference in Salt Lake City, Utah.
- October: GE Transportation Systems equipment is integrated into the demonstration system.
- November: Alstom equipment is integrated into the demonstration system.
- December: Ansaldo STS equipment is integrated into the demonstration system.

=== 2009 ===
- January: 50 attendees view the successful demonstration of the fully integrated ICBS system (all four participating companies) in a lab in Syracuse, New York.

== See also ==
- Communication-Based Train Control (CBTC)
- Positive Train Control (PTC)
