= Union Switch & Signal =

American company (1881–2009)

Union Switch & Signal Inc.

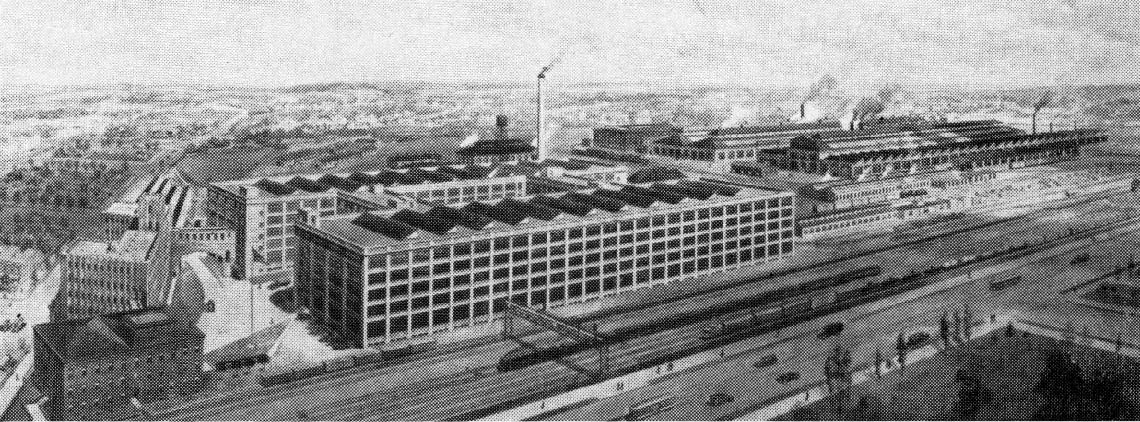
- US&S head office located in Swissvale, Pennsylvania, as seen in 1929
- Type: Subsidiary
- Industry: Electronics
- Founded: 1881; 145 years ago
- Founder: George Westinghouse
- Defunct: January 2009; 17 years ago
- Fate: First acquired by WABCo in 1917, then other owners. In January 2009, it became "Ansaldo STS USA".
- Successor: Ansaldo STS USA
- Headquarters: Swissvale, Pennsylvania, U.S.
- Area served: Worldwide
- Products: Railway signaling equipment, communication systems and services, level crossing signals
- Number of employees: 900 (2005)
- Parent: Ansaldo STS (1988)

Union Switch & Signal Inc. (US&S) was an American company based in Pittsburgh, Pennsylvania, which manufactured railway signaling equipment, systems and services. The company was acquired by Ansaldo STS in 1988, operating as a wholly owned company until January 2009, when US&S was renamed "Ansaldo STS USA" to operate as a subsidiary of Ansaldo in the Americas and Asia.

== History ==
=== Early years ===
George Westinghouse founded Union Switch & Signal Inc. in 1881, consolidating the assets of the Union Electric Signal Company (founded by track circuit inventor William Robinson) and the Interlocking Switch & Signal Company (which had pioneered interlockings). In 1925, US&S acquired the Hall Signal Company, primarily to obtain the latter company's patents for searchlight signals.

=== Corporate management ===
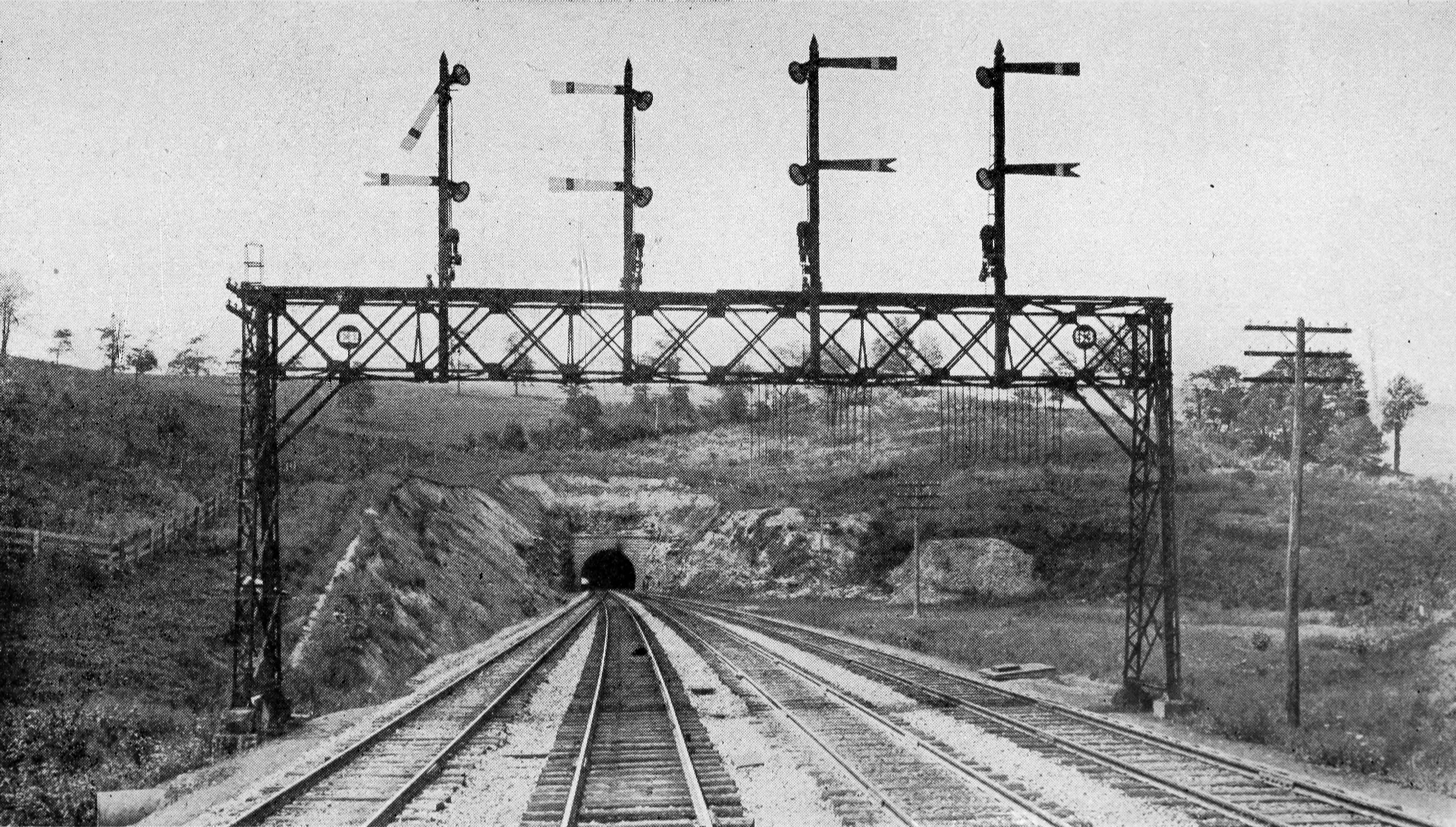
US&S signal bridge, pictured in 1913

US&S operated as an independent company until 1917, when it became a subsidiary of the Westinghouse Air Brake Company (WABCO). In 1968, American Standard purchased WABCO and reorganized US&S as a separate division.

In 1988, Ansaldo STS, a global supplier of signaling, control and automation systems, purchased US&S from American Standard. In November 1993, US&S became a publicly traded company with shares listed on Nasdaq. In December 1996, US&S merged with the other signaling investments of Ansaldo. As a result of that merger, US&S became a wholly owned subsidiary of Ansaldo STS. The company was renamed Ansaldo STS – USA in January 2009. Ansaldo was acquired by Hitachi and Ansaldo STS became Hitachi Rail STS in 2019.

Throughout its history, US&S had manufacturing facilities in the borough of Swissvale, Pennsylvania. The Swissvale plant was closed in 1985 and demolished in 1986. US&S moved manufacturing operations to a facility in Batesburg-Leesville, South Carolina. It maintained a research facility in Pittsburgh.

== Product development ==
=== Railway signaling ===
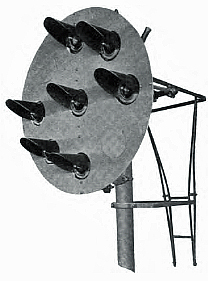
US&S position light signal, 1922

US&S built the first power interlocking system in the United States, a pneumatic design, in 1882 at East St. Louis, Illinois.

In 1901, US&S developed the first electro-pneumatic automatic train stop system for the Boston Elevated Railway. This system was later adopted by the New York City Subway and other transit systems. In 1908, the company introduced an electrically controlled highway crossing gate.

In 1923, US&S developed the first inductive train control system. (See also pulse code cab signaling.) The company developed coded track circuits, supporting bi-directional cab signaling, in 1934.

The first digital rail yard control system was built by US&S in 1970, for the Atchison, Topeka & Santa Fe railway at Kansas City, Kansas.

=== The "Teardrop" mechanical bell ===
US&S first patented the Model 15A Highway crossing bell on February 20, 1917. The bell has been commonly referred to as the "Teardrop" bell by railroaders and signal fans alike because of its unique shape and thus the name has stuck. This bell has appeared on advertising literature for railroad signals as far back as the 1920s as far abroad as Chile and Italy on early wig wag crossings and flashers. There have been subtle variations in the Teardrop bell over the years ranging from different sized electric coils, inclusion of the patent date on the rain hood, as well as a very early version with a less characteristic rain hood that simply read "UNION, patent pending." This is the least commonly seen variation of the Teardrop. This bell is treasured by many signal collectors for its slow, low pitched ring at an irregular cadence. The production of this bell was discontinued sometime by the 1960s, but WABCO carried replacement castings and service manuals into the 1970s.

=== Wartime production ===
During World War I the Le Rhône 9C 9 cylinder rotary engine was manufactured under license by US&S. It was one of the most common engines for fighter planes from different companies and around 10,000 were made at Swissvale.

US&S was one of the five contractors (including Colt, Remington-Rand, Ithaca Gun Company, and Singer Sewing Machine) to make M1911A1 pistols during World War II. The production blocks assigned to them in 1943 were between SN's 1,041,405 to 1,096,404. Colt duplicated 4,171 pistols in the 1,088,726 to 1,092,896 SN range. Since only 55,000 1911A1's were produced by US&S, they are highly collectible. The reason for the low production numbers is US&S was the last company awarded a government contract and as requirements were reduced in early 1943, the last contract awarded became the first to be cancelled. As a general rule, US&S produced high quality pistols. With the government-owned machine tooling already in place at US&S, they were offered a subcontract arrangement to produce M1 Carbine components. Only Singer produced fewer 1911A1's at 500 total production.

== Modern products ==
=== Level crossing signal ===
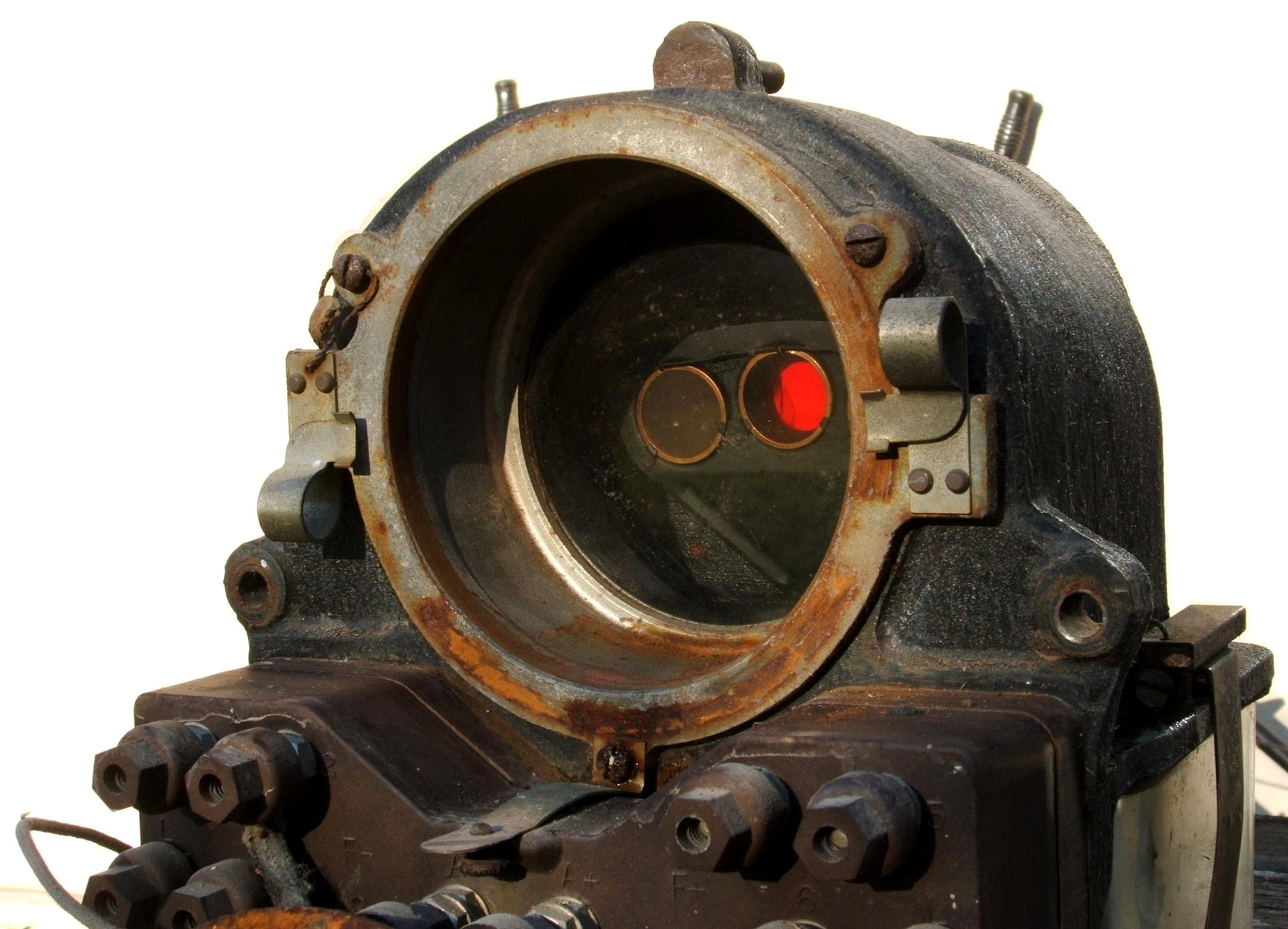
Mechanism of a searchlight signal made by Union Switch & Signal in 1944 for the Rock Island Railroad

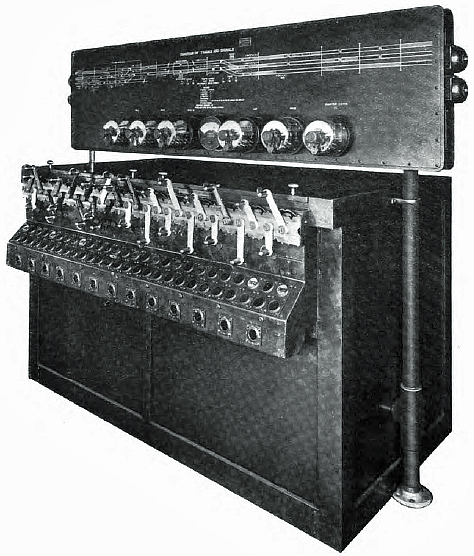
US&S Model 14 power interlocking machine (1922)

- Level crossing signals:
  - Model 95 gate mechanism
  - 8" and 12" flashing lights
  - Bells^{1}, mastils, gate arms and counterweights
- Cab signaling equipment
- Automatic train control
- Automatic train protection
- Automatic train stop

=== Wayside signaling equipment ===
- DC code systems
- Electronic communication systems
- Electronic interlocking
- Relays
- Railway signals
- Switch machines
- Track circuits

=== Central control signaling equipment ===
- Computer-based manual control systems
- Computer-based traffic management systems
- Dark territory control systems
- Electro-mechanical centralized traffic control machines

Note

- ^{1} US&S was the only company to make 180 degree electronic bells.

== See also ==
- General Railway Signal – The other major US railway signaling company
- North American railroad signals
- Safetran – Another US railway signaling company, now part of Siemens
