= William Robinson (inventor) =

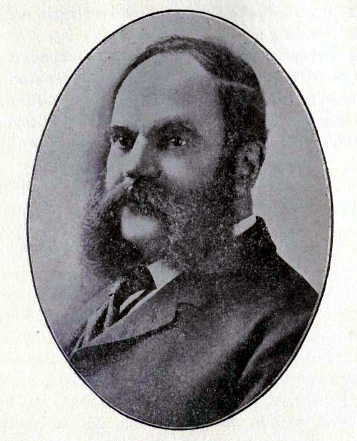
- Born: November 22, 1840; Ireland
- Died: January 2, 1921 (aged 80); Brooklyn, New York
- Occupations: Engineer, inventor, businessman
- Years active: 1860s-1920
- Known for: Invention of railway track circuit

William Robinson (November 22, 1840 – January 2, 1921) was an American inventor, electrical engineer, mechanical engineer and businessman. He invented the first track circuit used in railway signaling, a major development that improved railroad safety and efficiency.

== Early life and education ==
William Robinson was born in Ireland on November 22, 1840. He came to the United States as a boy and lived in Brooklyn, New York for much of his adult life.

He received his B.A. degree in 1865 and his M.A. degree in 1868 from Wesleyan University. He received a Ph.D. in Electrical and Mechanical Engineering from Boston University in 1907.

== Railway signaling inventions ==
Robinson began developing an automatic block signal system for railroads in 1867. His first system was installed on the Philadelphia and Erie Railroad in 1870. He received multiple patents for railway signaling inventions:

- 1870: automatic electrical and electrically controlled fluid pressure signal systems (U.S.)
- 1871: automatic electro-pneumatic electric signal systems (U.K.)
- 1872: closed track circuit system (U.S. and France).

Robinson's invention of the closed track circuit, often referred to as "failsafe" due to its ability to reliably detect abnormalities such as broken wiring or a broken rail, was one of the key developments in railway safety, and paved the way for trustworthy railway signaling. The failsafe track circuit remains in widespread use.

He established the Robinson Electric Railway Signal Company in 1873 and during the 1870s his signal systems were installed on railroads throughout the United States. He lived in Boston in the mid-1870s and supervised installation of his systems on the Boston and Lowell Railroad, the Boston and Providence Railroad, and other roads in the region. He organized the Union Electric Signal Company in 1878. This company, holding valuable patents on track circuit designs, was acquired by the newly formed Union Switch and Signal (US&S) in 1881.

== Other inventions ==
Following the sale of Union Electric Signal to US&S, Robinson turned his attention to other fields, particularly mechanical inventions. His other significant inventions included:

- the Robinson radial car truck
- the first coaster brake used on bicycles
- roller bearing skates, and
- a repeating telephone.

William Robinson was the author of History of Automatic Electric and Electrically Controlled Fluid Pressure Signal Systems for Railroads (1906).

== Professional recognition ==
Robinson was a Fellow of the American Institute of Electrical Engineers, and an esteemed member of the Signal Section of the American Railway Association.

Robinson died on January 2, 1921, in Brooklyn.
