= Northeast Operating Rules Advisory Committee =

Body of railroads that establish a set of rules

The Northeast Operating Rules Advisory Committee (NORAC) is a body of railroads that establish a set of operating rules for railroads in North America. The NORAC rulebook is used by full and associate member railroads, located mostly in the Northeast United States.

== Members ==
=== Full members ===
- Amtrak (AMTK)
- Conrail Shared Assets Operations (CR)
- CSX Transportation (CSXT)
- Keolis Commuter Services: Boston (KCS)
- New Jersey Transit Rail Operations (NJTR)
- New York, Susquehanna and Western Railway Corp. (NYSW)
- Norfolk Southern (NS)
- Southeastern Pennsylvania Transportation Authority (SEPTA)

=== Associate members ===
- Adirondack Scenic Railroad (ADIX)
- Adrian and Blissfield Railroad (ABDF)
- Bay Colony Railroad (BCLR)
- Buckingham Branch Railroad (BB)
- Cape Cod Central Railroad
- Cape May Seashore Lines (CMSL)
- Central New England Railroad (CNZR)
- Central Railroad Company of Indiana (CIND)
- Central Railroad Company of Indianapolis (CERA)
- Chesapeake and Delaware LLC
- Connecticut Southern Railroad (CSO)
- C&S Railroad Corporation
- East Jersey Railroad & Terminal Co. (EJR)
- Finger Lakes Railway (FGLK)
- Flats Industrial Railroad (FIR)
- Fore River Transportation Corporation (FRVT)
- Genesee Valley Transportation (GVT)
- Housatonic Railroad Company (HRRC)
- Indiana Harbor Belt Railroad (IHB)
- Luzerne and Susquehanna Railway (LS)
- Maine Eastern Railroad (MERR)
- Massachusetts Central Railroad (MCER)
- Massachusetts Coastal Railroad (MC)
- Milford-Bennington Railroad (MBRX)
- Morristown and Erie Railway (ME)
- Mountain Division Railway Corporation
- Narragansett Bay Railroad Company
- National Park Service
- Naugatuck Railroad Company (NAUG)
- New Hope and Ivyland Railroad (NHRR)
- New York and Greenwood Lake Railway (NYGL)
- New York New Jersey Rail, LLC (NYNJ)
- North Shore Railroad (NSHR)
- Northern Central Railway (NCRY)
- Owego & Hartford Railway, Inc. (OHRY)
- Pennsylvania Northeastern Railroad (PNE)
- Plymouth & Lincoln Railroad
- Port Jersey Railroad (PJR)
- Raritan Central Railway (RCRY)
- Seaview Transportation Company (SVTX)
- Seminole Gulf Railway (SGLR)
- SMS Rail Service (SLRS)
- Somerset Railroad (SOM)
- Southern New Jersey Rail Group (NJ Transit RiverLINE)
- Southern Railroad of New Jersey (SRNJ)
- Springfield Terminal Railway Company, d/b/a Pan Am Railways (ST)
- Valley Railroad (VALE)
- West Chester Railroad (WCRL)
- Winamac Southern Railway (WSRY)
- Winnipesaukee Scenic Railroad

== Overview ==
The NORAC rules are intended to enhance railroad safety. The rules cover employee responsibilities, signaling equipment, procedures for safe train movement, dealing with accidents and other topics that directly and indirectly affect railroad safety.

These rules govern operation on main lines, defined as those with some form of block control system.

The 10th edition of the NORAC operating rules went into effect on November 6, 2011.

The 11th edition of the NORAC operating rules went into effect on February 1, 2018.

The 12th edition of the NORAC Operating Rules went into effect on January 1, 2024.

== History ==
In January 1985, six railroads (Conrail, Amtrak, Metro-North, New Jersey Transit, Southeastern Pennsylvania Transportation Authority, and Delaware & Hudson) met in Newark, New Jersey with the goal to create a common operating rulebook. In May 1985, a second meeting was held, with eight railroads present, five of the original six (Metro-North withdrew) plus Providence and Worcester, Long Island Rail Road, and Boston & Maine.

The first rulebook was released in January 1987. It contained rules for three types of train control: automatic block (ABS), manual block (MBS), and voice (VCS). The MBS and VCS systems were both governed by NORAC's Form D, which is a train order transmitted directly to the train.

In 1993 the fourth edition combined the MBS and VCS rules into a single "Form D Control System" (DCS).

== Categories ==
The full set of NORAC rules is divided into 25 categories.

1. Terminology, Definitions and Authorized Abbreviations
2. General Rules
3. Reporting for Duty
4. Miscellaneous Signals
5. Tampering
6. Inspection of Equipment
7. Movement of Trains
8. Protection of Trains
9. Movement Permit Form D
10. General Signal Rules
11. Signal Aspects and Indications
12. Form D Control System
13. Automatic Block Signal System
14. Cab Signal System
15. Interlockings and Controlled Points
16. Radios and Telephones
17. Movement of Track Cars
18. Dispatchers
19. Operators
20. Train Service Employees
21. Engine Service Employees
22. Yardmasters
23. Station Masters and Assistant Station Masters
24. Foremen and Track Car Drivers
25. Form D Illustration

== See also ==
- General Code of Operating Rules
