= General Code of Operating Rules =

Railway operating rulebook

The General Code of Operating Rules (GCOR) is a set of operating rules for railroads in the United States. The GCOR is used by Class I railroads west of Chicago, most of the Class II railroads, and many Short-line railroads.

Some railroads in the northeast United States follow NORAC, while Canada and Mexico have their own set of operating rules that govern their railroad operations.

== Overview ==
The GCOR rules are intended to enhance railroad safety. The rules cover employee responsibilities, signaling equipment, procedures for safe train movement, dealing with accidents and other topics that directly and indirectly affect railroad safety. Some railroads modify the GCOR rules to suit their specific operations.

The GCOR is supplemented by System Special Instructions, Timetables, Hazardous Materials Instructions, Air Brake and Train Handling Instructions, and General Orders. These documents are issued by each individual railroad. System Special instructions, Timetables, and General Order can modify or amend the General Code of Operating Rules. GCOR 1.3.2 states that General Orders replace any rule, special instruction, or regulation that conflicts with the general order.

Some railroads will maintain what they call a "living rulebook." As amendments are released via general order or special instruction, they will update the specific page that was affected. An example of this is the Union Pacific, which maintains a copy of the GCOR with page-by-page amendments.

The current version of the GCOR is the Ninth Edition, effective September 23, 2025.

== Categories ==
The full set of GCOR rules is divided into 19 categories.

1. General Responsibilities
2. Railroad Radio and Communication Rules
3. Section Reserved
4. Timetables
5. Signals and Their Use
6. Movement of Trains and Engines
7. Switching
8. Switches
9. Block System Rules
10. Rules Applicable Only in Centralized Traffic Control (CTC)
11. Rules Applicable in ACS, ATC and ATS Territories
12. Rules Applicable Only in Automatic Train Stop (ATS) Territory
13. Rules Applicable Only in Automatic Cab Signal System (ACS) Territory
14. Rules Applicable Only Within Track Warrant Control (TWC) Limits
15. Track Bulletin Rules
16. Rules Applicable Only in Direct Traffic Control (DTC) Limits
17. Rules Applicable Only in Automatic Train Control (ATC) Territory
18. Rules Applicable Only in Positive Train Control (PTC) Territory
19. Section Reserved

== See also ==
- Northeast Operating Rules Advisory Committee
- Canadian Rail Operating Rules
