= Signalling block system =

Railway signaling system

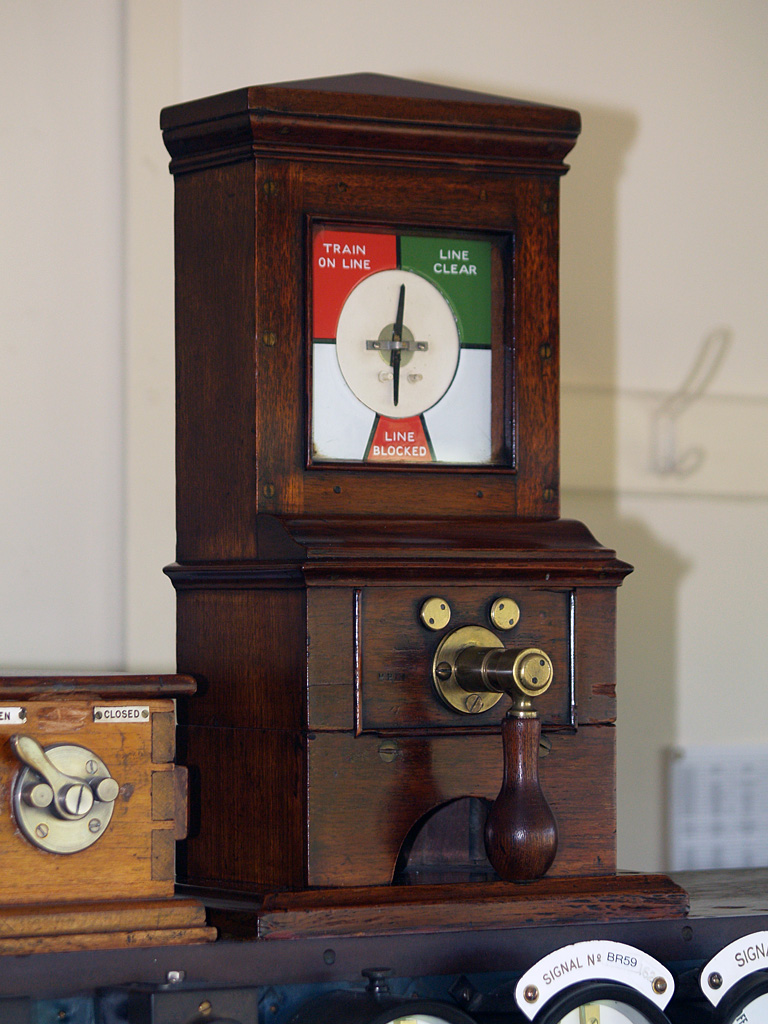
A block instrument on the Midland Railway

A signalling block system (or block system) is a safety mechanism primarily found on railways that is used to prevent trains from colliding. Block systems divide the track into fixed segments ("blocks") using signals, sensors, or other equipment, and one train may occupy a block at a time. This ensures that a train always has time to stop before getting dangerously close to another train on the same line. The block system is referred to in the UK as the method of working, in the US as the method of operation, and in Australia as safeworking.

Block systems are also commonly found on large roller coasters that can operate two or more trains simultaneously. Brakes are commonly used to stop a roller coaster train when needed.

== Advantages and disadvantages ==
Due to a train's long stopping distances, block systems safely prevent one train from colliding into another, by ensuring that there is a certain minimum distance between trains. This distance is set to ensure that any train operating within the speed and load limits will have time to stop before reaching a train ahead of it. There are many ways of implementing such a system.

A disadvantage with block systems is that they limit the number of trains on a particular route to the number of blocks. Since the route has a fixed length, increasing the number of trains requires creating more and shorter blocks, and trains would need to operate at lower speeds in order to stop safely. (Note: This is assuming the trains themselves are not changing. A counterexample is the Advanced Passenger Train, which was specifically designed with powerful brakes in order to operate at high speed within what was a relatively low-speed block layout.) As a result, the number and size of blocks are closely related to the overall route capacity, and cannot be changed easily because expensive alterations to the signals along the line would be required.

== Block signalling methods ==
=== Strict timetable operation ===
Most rail routes have a sort of natural block layout inherent in the layout of the railway stations. This provides the ability to implement a set of blocks using manual signalling based at these locations. In this case, the station operator places a flag indicating a train has just left the station, and removes it only after a fixed time.

Trains operate according to a strict timetable, and as such, cannot leave a station until an appointed time, and until any other trains they were to meet at that station have arrived. If one train is delayed, all trains it is scheduled to meet are delayed. This can quickly lead to all trains on the railway being affected.

This method is not authorised for use in many high-traffic railway systems because it is potentially unsafe and highly inefficient.

=== Timetable and train order ===
Popular on single track lines in North America up until the 1980s, Train Order operation was less a block system and more of a system of determining which trains would have the right of way when train movements would come into conflict. Trains would make use of a predetermined operating plan known as the timetable which made use of fixed passing locations often referred to as stations. Amendments to the operating plan would come from a train dispatcher in the form of train orders, transmitted to the trains via intermediaries known as agents or operators at train order stations.

This method is not currently authorised for use in the UK. A similar system, known as Telegraph and Crossing Order, was used in the 19th century, but after three serious head-on collisions in the 1870s (Menheniot, Cornwall Railway, 1873; Thorpe, Great Eastern Railway, 1874; Radstock, Somerset & Dorset Railway, 1876) its use was condemned.

In North American train order system was often implemented on top of other block systems when those block systems needed to be superseded. For example, where manual or automatic block was implemented, train orders would be used to authorize movements into occupied blocks, against the current of traffic or where no current of traffic was established.

=== One train working ===
==== One train working (with train staff) ====
If a single track branch line is a dead end with a simple shuttle train service, then a single token is sufficient. The driver of any train entering the branch line (or occupying any part of it) must be in possession of the token, and no collision with another train is possible. For convenience in passing it from hand to hand, the token was often in the form of a staff, typically 800 mm long and 40 mm diameter, and is referred to as a train staff. Such a staff may be a wooden staff with a brass plate stating the section of line on which it is valid, or it may be in the form of a key.

In UK terminology, this method of working was originally referred to as One Engine in Steam (OES).

==== One train working (without train staff) ====
A modern variation of the One Train Working system operates without any train staff. On these lines the clearance of the controlled branch entry signal is the driver's sole authority to enter the branch, and once the train has passed that signal, the interlocking will hold it at 'danger' (and the signal cannot be cleared a subsequent time) until the branch service train, on its return journey has sequentially operated two track circuits at the start of the branch. Continuous train detection on the branch is not required. Safety is ensured by the interlocking circuitry, and if a track-circuit failure occurs then special emergency working by pilotman must be introduced.

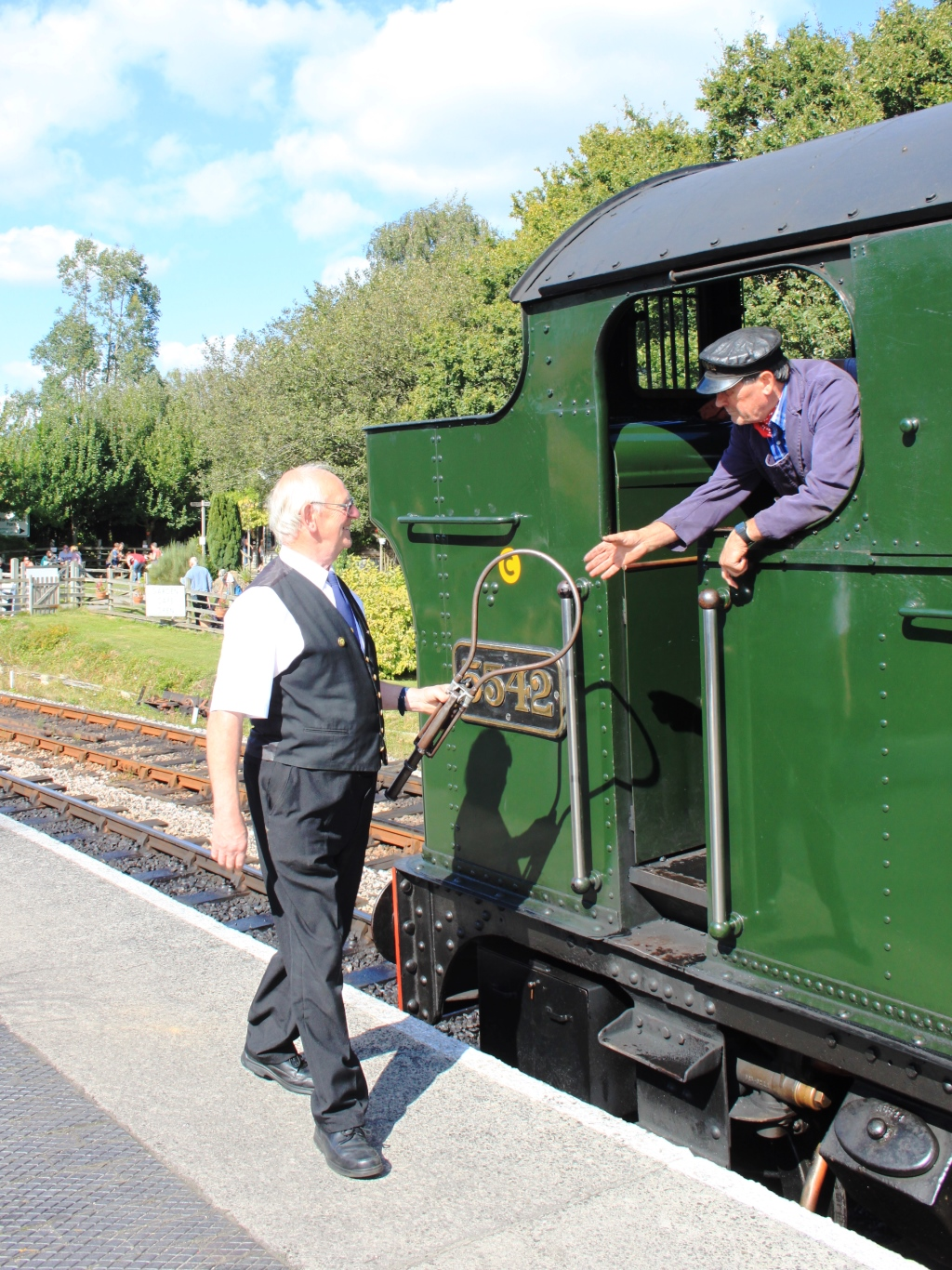
Accepting a token on the South Devon Railway

=== Token block ===
Authority to occupy a block is provided by physical possession of a token by train staff that is obtained in such a way that ensures that only one train is in a section of track at a time.

==== Ordinary train staff (OTS) ====
A driver approaching a single track section would get the token, and uses it as the authority to enter the block section. He would surrender the token at the other end of the section. This caused problems if one train was to be followed by another in the same direction, as the staff would not be at the correct end after the first train.

==== Ordinary train staff and ticket (OTST) or (OTS&T) ====
Ordinary train staff (OTS) was therefore extended: if one train was to be followed by another in the same direction, the driver of the first train was required to be shown the token, but not take possession of it (in theory he was supposed to physically touch the token, but this was not strictly followed). He was given a written authority to enter the single line section, referred to as the ticket. He could then proceed, surrendering the ticket at the other end of the section, and a second train could follow in possession of the staff.

=== Manual block system ===
Authority to occupy a block is conveyed to trains by the use of wayside signals manually controlled by human operators following various procedures to communicate with other block stations to ensure separation of trains.

==== Telegraph block ====
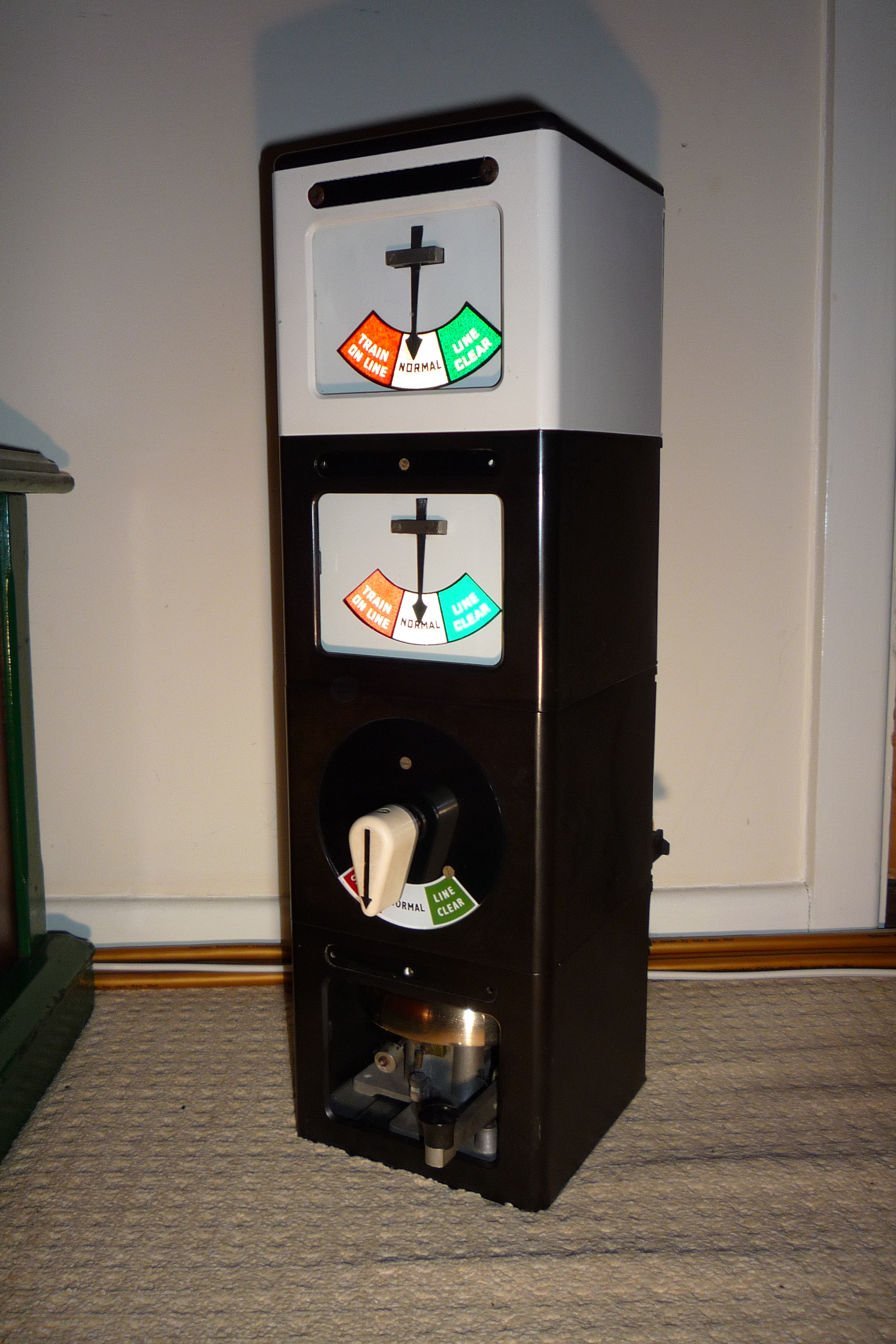
Telegraph block instruments of standard British Railways design. The bell is in the bottom part with the key for sounding the bell in the next signal box. Above that is the switch for indicating whether the section of line is clear (green), there is a train in that section (red) or the normal "line blocked" state (white).

Used on multiple track sections whereby the passage of trains from one point to the next is controlled by instruments connected by telegraph wires. In the simplest case with three signal boxes on a stretch of line without junctions, the central of the three boxes will receive a request for a train to be accepted, the signaller will set any relevant points (turnouts) and signals and signal acceptance, and then request acceptance by the next signal box along the line. When the train has passed, the signals behind it will be set back to danger and the signaller will inform the next signal box when the train has left the section. These messages are conveyed by telegraph instruments with a key that is pressed to sound a bell at the remote signal box. Such systems, such as absolute block signalling, were developed in the nineteenth century and are still used extensively in Britain and Australia.

==== Telephonic block ====
In this system, the occupation of a given section of track between two stations is agreed between its station masters, via telephone. For greater safety there can be additional layers of protection; for example, a regulating post, with supervisory powers connected to all the stations in a line; timetable (Portugal); and/or computer assistance (France).

Portugal, Spain and France still use this system on at least some main lines, although the total length of track governed by this system is decreasing rapidly due to its labour intensity and its inherent perceived lack of safety, relying as it does primarily on human communication (sometimes involving more than just the two station masters at each end of the block) and simple railway interlockings at the stations.

In Portugal, the telephonic block was the main safety system across the national railway network until the mid-1990s. Thus, it evolved to try to provide multiple layers of safety on busy single-track lines with diverse train types, albeit at the cost of high levels of staffing. In the Portuguese system, although the authority of train movement on the main lines is the sole responsibility of the stations along those lines, a regulating post oversees them and, in case of disagreement, instructs stations as to how the traffic should be organised. On the other hand, each train timetable indicates all interactions with other trains (e.g. crossings with other trains; trains that they overtake; trains that overtake them) clearly marked at the stations at which those interactions should occur. Any deviation from that—arising, for example, from delays or extra trains—must be provided to the train crews in writing. Despite the general practice that, when two trains cross, they both stop at the nearest station, this system allows for good average speeds for fast trains similar to those on an automatic-signalling line. However, if minor delays occur and then proliferate, longer delays can arise as the system's additional safety mode is invoked (i.e. the paperwork-intensive process of updating train-movement instructions to reflect the altered crossing patterns). Such delays would not happen, at least not for the same reason, on an automatic-signalling line.

In general, the system dictates that a block is assumed to be closed; that is, permission must be obtained before a train is allowed to enter a block at one station en route to the other. However, in France, on multiple tracks, the block is usually open in unidirectional track sections. That is, after a station confirms that a previous train has vacated the block, the next train travelling in the same direction can immediately enter the block, with the station master at the entry station informing the exit station of the time that the train entered the block.

=== Tokenless block ===
This is a system for use on single track railways, which requires neither the use of tokens nor provision of continuous train detection through the section. The signalling is designed in such a way that the controlling signals will only allow one train to enter the line at any one time. The signaller at the far end of the section must visually check that the whole train has left the section and has not become divided by confirming the train is 'complete with tail lamp'.

=== Automatic block signaling ===
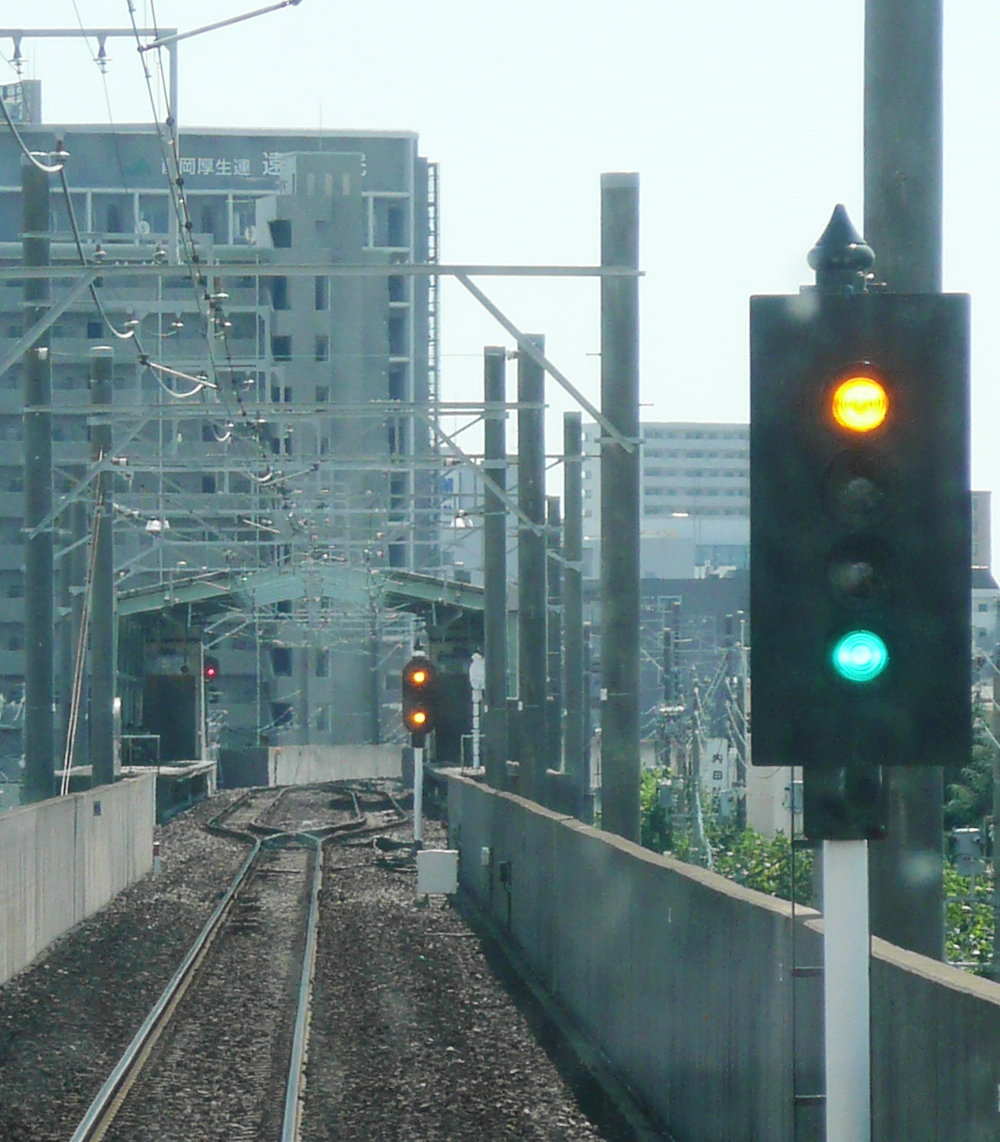
Vertical colour light signal on the Enshū Railway Line in Japan

Automatic block signaling uses a series of automated signals, normally lights or flags, that change their display, or aspect, based on the movement of trains past a sensor. This is by far the most common type of block system as of 2018, used in almost every type of railway from rapid transit systems to railway mainlines. There is a wide variety of systems, and an even wider variety of signals, but they all work in roughly the same fashion.

Like the manual block systems outlined above, automatic systems divide the route into fixed blocks. At the end of each block, a set of signals is installed, along with a track-side sensor. When a train passes the sensor, the signals are triggered to display the "block occupied" aspect on the signals at either end of that block. In most systems the signals do not immediately return to the "block empty" aspect when the train leaves, instead there is some sort of mechanical delay that retains the block occupied aspect, or more commonly, presents a "proceed with caution" aspect.

=== Moving blocks ===
In terms of ensuring safety, the real consideration is the stopping distance of a given train and the distance at which it can spot another train. Blocks do not actually implement this concept, they implement a signalling system that ensures the worst performing train on a line has enough time to stop. This means any train with better stopping performance is forced to operate at speeds that are lower than its maximum, unless all of the trains on a particular line are identical.

The key issue is that a given train cannot safely see another train in time to stop. However, this is not true for trains that are equipped with some sort of inter-train communications system. In this case, any given train can keep itself at a safe distance from other trains, without the need for fixed blocks. These moving block systems have become popular since the required technology first started appearing in the 1970s.

In such systems, any train on the route can listen for signals from all the other trains, and then move in a way to ensure they have enough distance to stop. Early moving block systems used a cable strung along the rail line. Trains would use magnetic inductance to inject signals into the line indicating their location. The cable could also provide that location in a variety of ways that could be picked up by a sensor on the train. More modern systems may use off-board location systems like Global Positioning System or track-side indicators, and send the data between the trains using various radio-based methods.

The advantage to moving block systems is that there is no fixed number of trains on the line, because there are no fixed blocks. This can greatly improve route capacity, as seen in the Jubilee line and Northern line on the London Underground, where upgrades for the 2012 Summer Olympics improved capacity by about 50%.

== History ==
The first use of block working was probably in 1839 when a Cooke and Wheatstone telegraph was installed in the Clay Cross Tunnel of the North Midland Railway. The telegraph instruments were replaced in 1841 with ones specific to block working. In 1842, William Fothergill Cooke, who had built the Clay Cross system, published Telegraphic Railways or the Single Line in which he proposed block working for general use as a safer way of working on single lines. Previously, separation of trains had relied on strict timetabling only, which was unable to allow for unforeseen events. In 1898, Martin Boda described a switching theory for block systems.

== See also ==
- Absolute block signalling
- Cab signalling
- Centralized traffic control
- Direct traffic control
- Radio Electronic Token Block
- Track warrant
- Train order operation
