= Automatic block signaling =

Railroad communications system

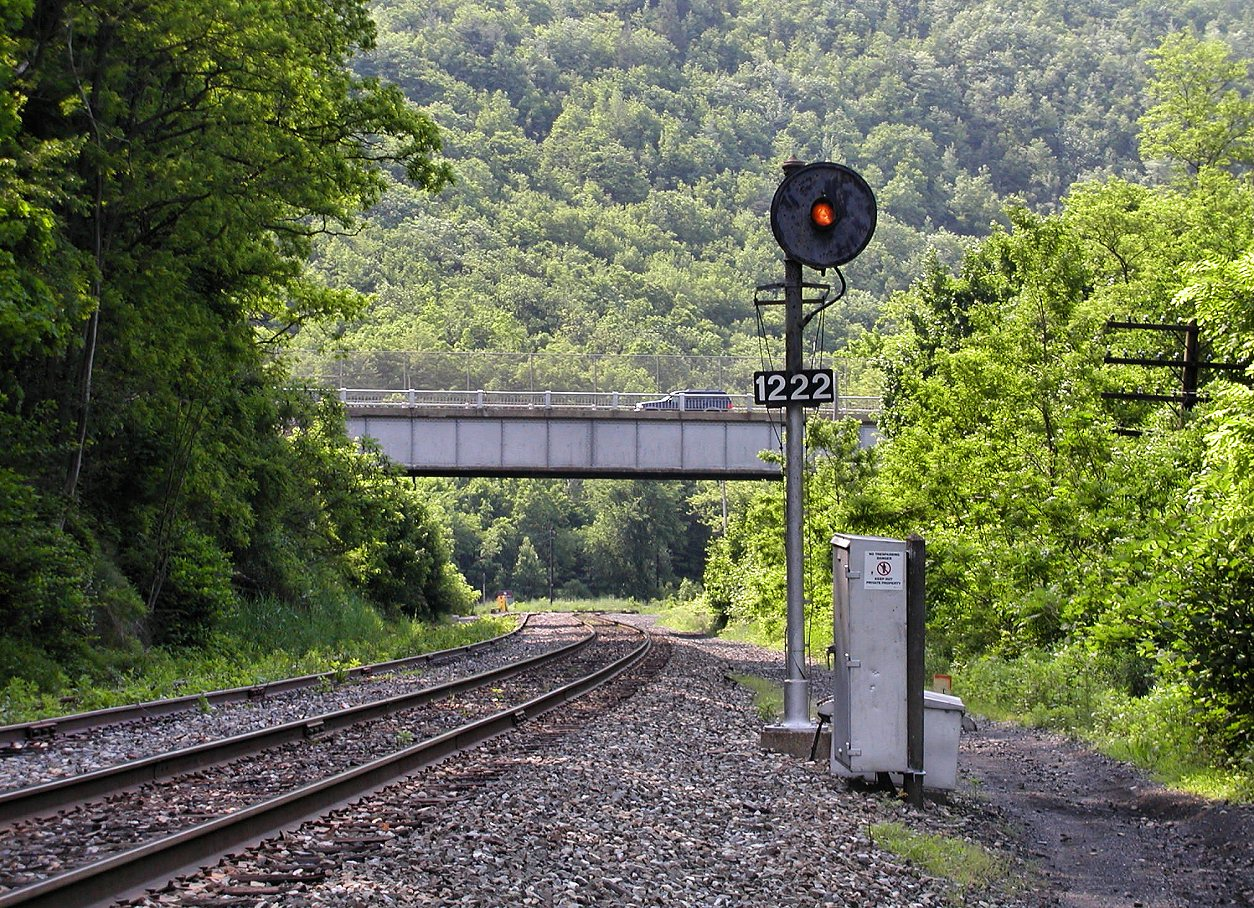
Searchlight type automatic block signal at Milepost 122.2 on the Reading Blue Mountain and Northern Railroad Lehigh Line (former Lehigh Valley Railroad) in Jim Thorpe, Pennsylvania

Automatic block signaling (ABS), spelled automatic block signalling or called track circuit block (TCB) in the UK, is a railroad communications system that consists of a series of signals that divide a railway line into a series of sections, called blocks. The system controls the movement of trains between the blocks using automatic signals. ABS operation is designed to allow trains operating in the same direction to follow each other in a safe manner without risk of rear-end collision.

The introduction of ABS reduced railways' costs and increased their capacity. Older manual block systems required human operators. The automatic operation comes from the system's ability to detect whether blocks are occupied or otherwise obstructed, and to convey that information to approaching trains. The system operates without any outside intervention, unlike more modern traffic control systems that require external control to establish a flow of traffic.

== History ==
The earliest way of managing multiple trains on one track was by use of a timetable and passing sidings. One train waited upon another, according to the instructions in the timetable, but if a train was delayed for any reason, all other trains might be delayed, waiting for it to appear at the proper place where they could pass safely. Operation of trains by timetable alone was supplemented by telegraphed train orders beginning in 1854 on the Erie Railroad. A railroad company dispatcher would send train orders to stations staffed by telegraphers, who wrote them down on standardized forms and handed them to train crews as they passed the station.

A manual block system in the United States was implemented by the Pennsylvania Railroad about 1863, a couple of decades before other American railroads began using it. This system required a railroad employee stationed at each signal to set the signals according to instructions received by telegraph from dispatchers. English railroads also used a "controlled manual" block system, which was adapted for use in the US by the New York Central and Hudson River Railroad in 1882.

The first use of automatic block signaling in the United Kingdom was installed on the Liverpool Overhead Railway on its opening in 1893. Instead of track circuits, the system used a setup of trackside mechanical, and later, electrical instruments (both functionally similar to treadles) that made contact with passing trains in order to trigger motor-operated mechanical signals. The first use of track circuit operated automatic block signaling in Britain was installed in 1902 by the LSWR's West of England line between Andover junction and Grateley which operated pneumatically powered mechanical signals.

By 1906, the Interstate Commerce Commission reported that of the 48,743 miles (78,444 km) of railroad in the United States that used a block system, there were 41,916 miles (67,457 km) protected by the manual block system, and only 6,827 miles (10,987 km) of automatic block, on either single or double track.

However, as time went on, many railroads came to see automatic block signaling as cost effective, since it reduced the need for employees to manually operate each signal, reduced the repair costs and damage claims resulting from collisions, made possible a more efficient flow of trains, reduced the number of hours trains and crews sat idle, and decreased overall transit times from point to point.

== Basic operation ==
=== In the United Kingdom ===
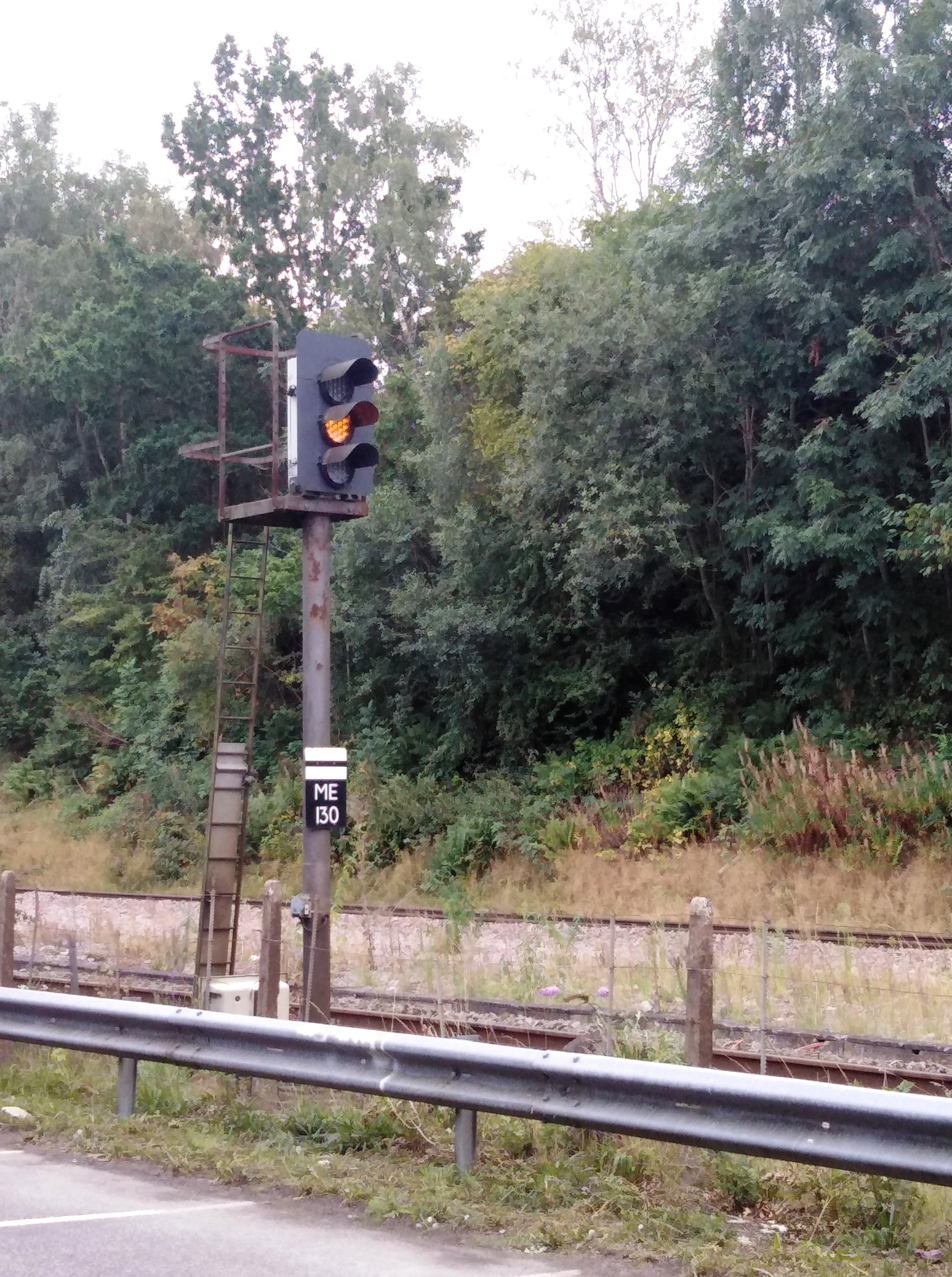
A caution signal at ME 130 at Beaconsfield station in England, where the horizontal black bar at the top of the ID plate indicates an automatic signal

In the UK, automatic signals are used where there are no ground frames, flat junctions, railroad switches, manually controlled level crossings, neutral sections, or other interlocking functions. It is standard practice to have an overlap after the signal. These overlaps can vary from 50 to 440 yards (46 to 402 m), with the standard overlap being 200 yards (180 m).

== Single-direction ABS ==
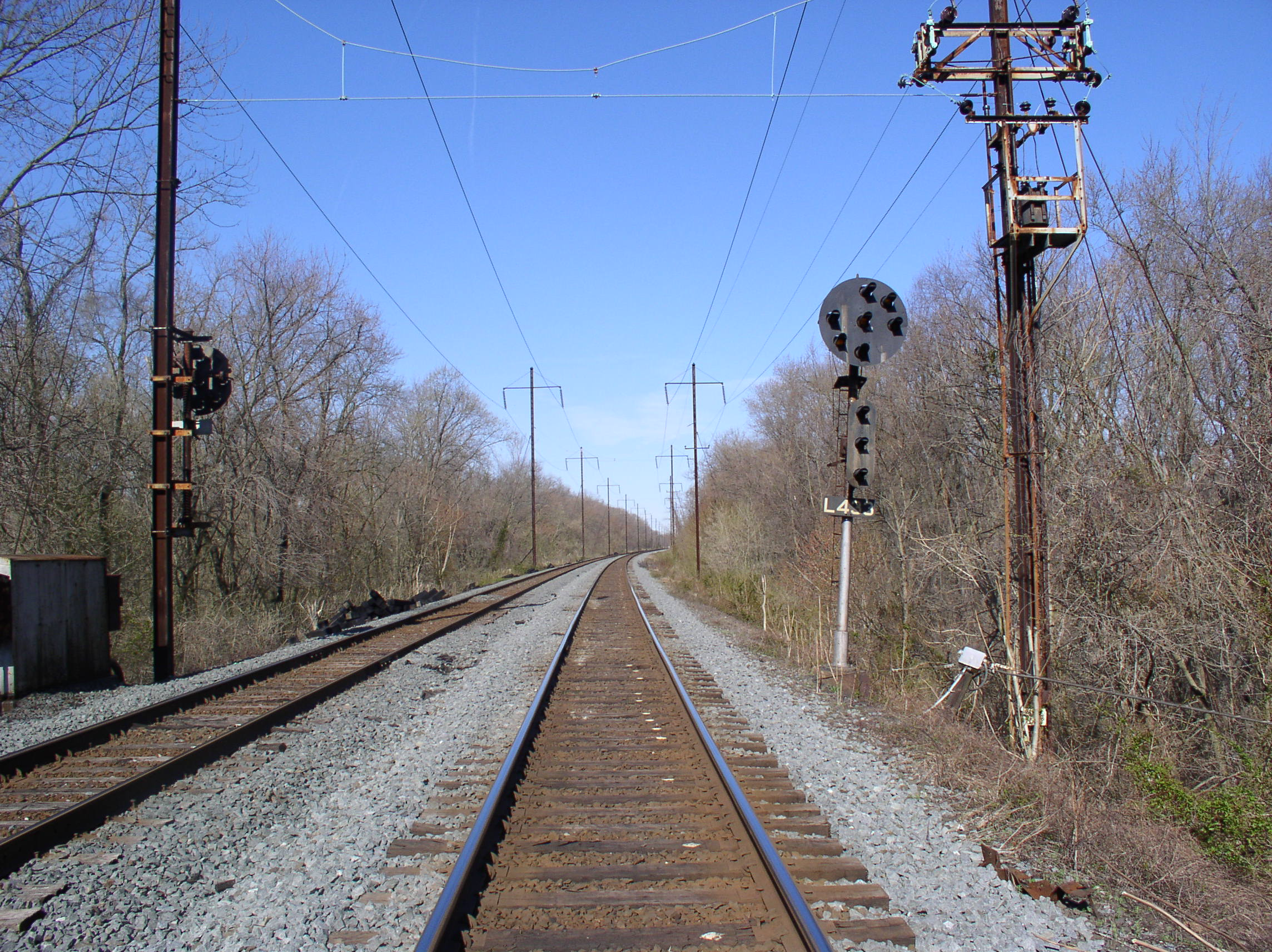
A pair of ABS position light signals each governing one direction of travel on Norfolk Southern Railway's Enola Branch (former Pennsylvania Railroad)

The most common forms of ABS were implemented on double-track rail lines in high-density areas that exceeded the capacity provided by either timetable and train order or other manual forms of signaling. ABS would be set up in such a way to cover train movements only in a single direction for each track. The movement of trains running in that direction would be governed by the automatic block signals which would supersede the normal superiority of trains, where such systems applied. Movement of trains operating against the established flow of traffic would still require train orders or other special manual protections to prevent a collision. Therefore, under ABS operation trains moving in the wrong direction incurs additional operational overhead and may not be well supported by the track infrastructure.

== See also ==
- Absolute block signalling – British railway signalling scheme
- Centralized traffic control – Railway signalling system
- Dark territory – Section of railway without signals
- Flagman – Person who controls the passage of a train by a level crossing
- Track warrant – Set of instructions to a train crew
