= Token (railway signalling) =

Method of controlling single line railways

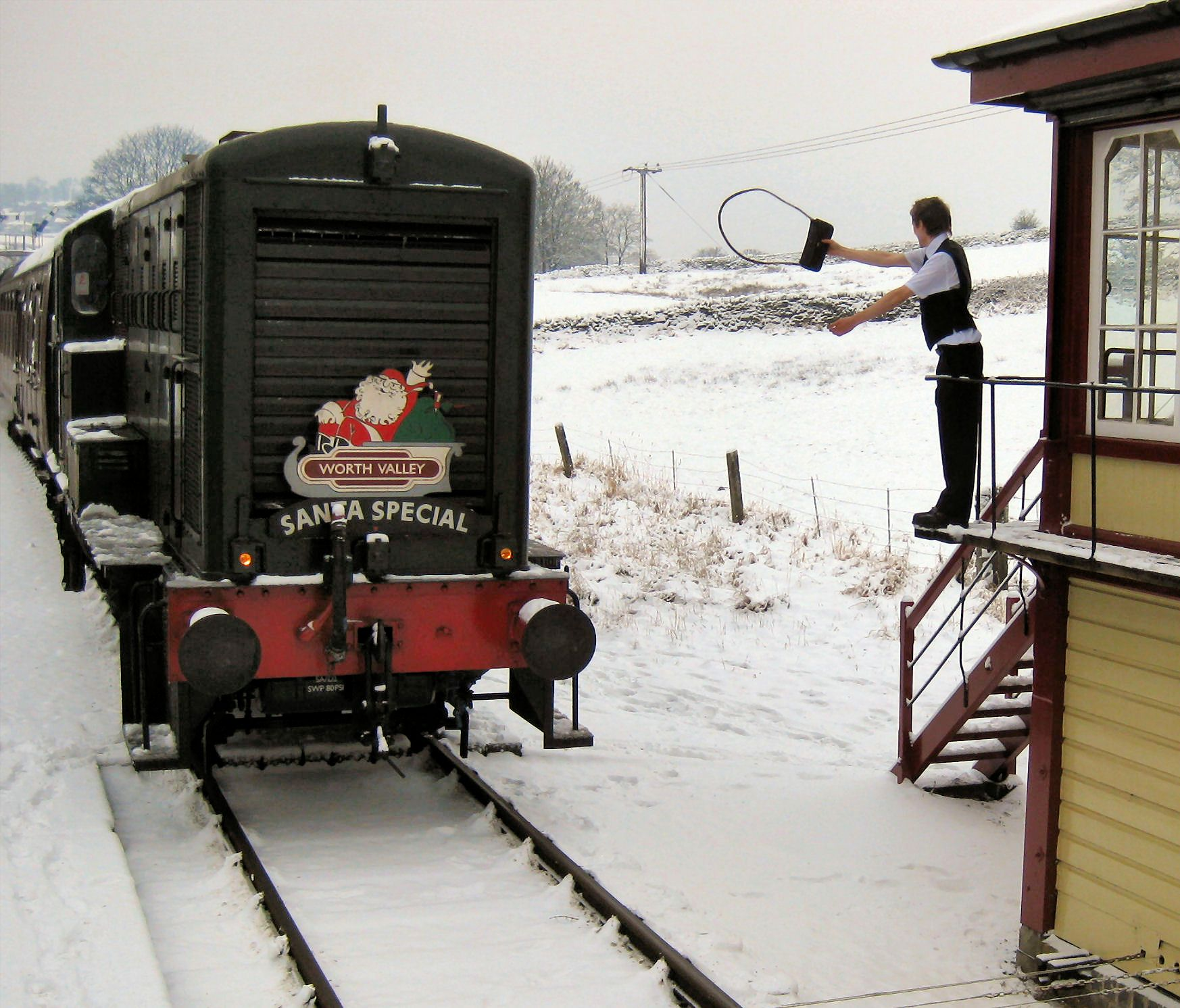
A token being offered by a signalman on the Keighley & Worth Valley Railway

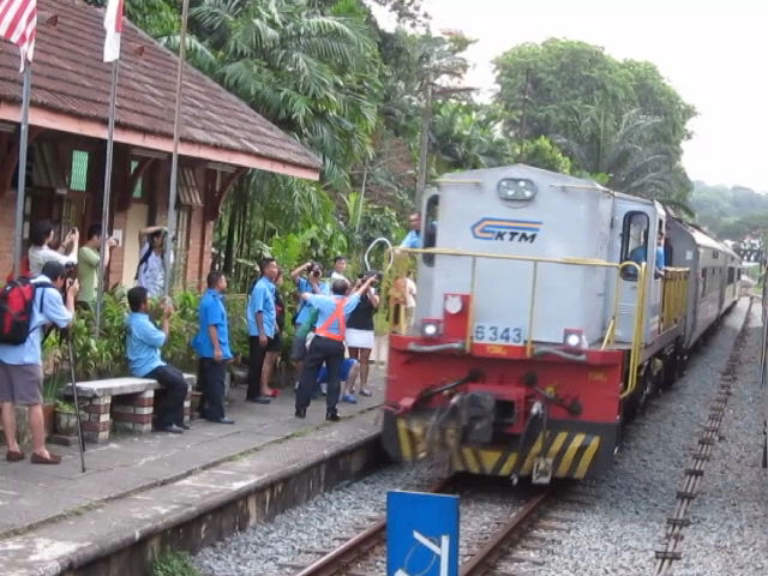
The moment the train driver picks up the next key token from the hands of the station master at the Bukit Timah Railway Station in Singapore moments after he had dropped off the previous token. This happened whilst the train was still moving fast.

In railway signalling, a token is a physical object which a train driver is required to have or see before entering onto a particular section of single track. The token is clearly endorsed with the names of the section to which it belongs. A token system is more commonly used for single lines because of the greater risk of collision in the event of a mistake being made by a signaller or traincrew than on double lines.

== Principle ==
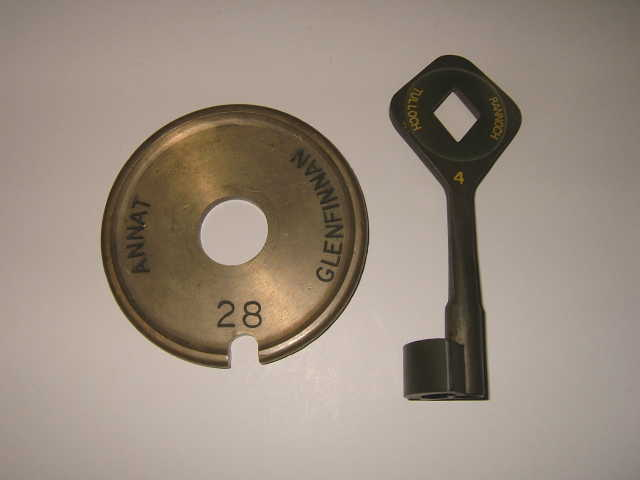
Examples of single line tokens: Tablet on left, key token on right

The operation of a bidirectional single track line has the hazard of two trains colliding. The simplest way to prevent such collisions is to have only one train in the section at any given time. Such a system is known as "one-engine-in-steam” (OES) or “one-train working" (OTW). This system is used on some branches of rail networks, and on heritage railways. The main disadvantage is that it restricts the number of train movements that can be made. For a larger railway system, it becomes exceptionally limiting in the level of operations that it allows, with the increased risk of mistakes being made, possibly leading to a collision.

Instead, reliance is placed not on employing only one train but on having a single physical object, known as a "token", available for the single track section, and ruling that a driver may enter the single line section only if in physical possession of that object. Existing in a variety of physical forms, such as a staff, tablet, key, or ball, the object is marked to indicate to which single track section it belongs.

== Token systems ==
=== Token only ===
The token system was developed in Britain in the 19th century, to enable safe working of single-line railways. For the very first time this system was proposed by Henry Woodhouse for Standedge Tunnels in 1849. If a branch line is a dead end with a simple shuttle train service, then a single token is sufficient. The driver of any train entering the branch line (or occupying any part of it) must be in possession of the token, and no collision with another train is possible.

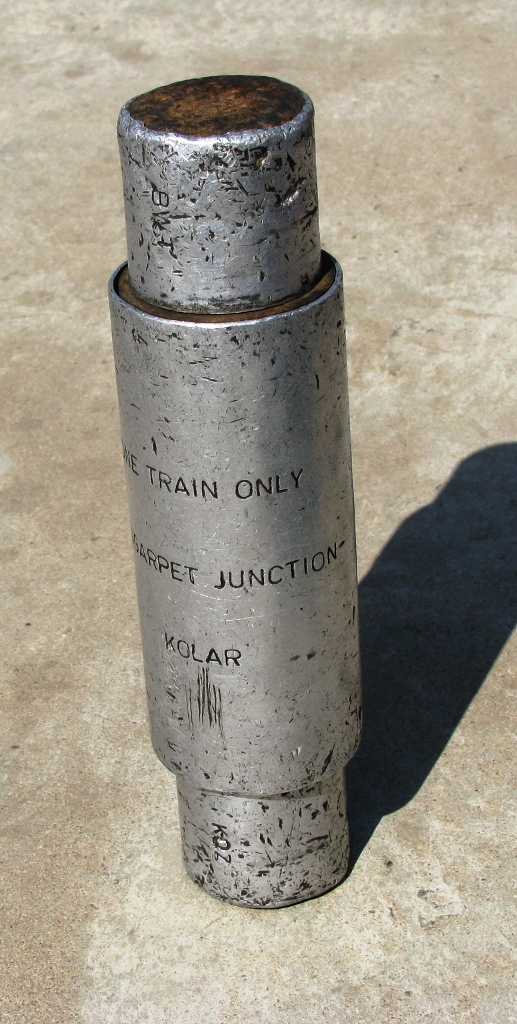
One Train Only token used by Indian Railways

For convenience in passing it from hand to hand, the token was often in the form of a staff, typically 800 mm (31 in) long and 40 mm (1.6 in) diameter, and is referred to as a train staff. Such a staff is usually literally a wooden staff with a brass plate stating the two signal boxes between which it is valid.

In UK terminology, this method of working on simple branch lines was originally referred to as One Engine in Steam (OES), and later One-Train Working (OTW). However the system was used on long through lines as well; R H Dutton, Chairman of the London and South Western Railway explained in 1876 the slow journey time between Exeter and Plymouth by saying, "the cause of the delay is the stopping at every station on the staff system. That really does cause a great delay because if the staff is not there, the train must stop while a man is sent on a horse to get it [from the other end of the section]"; quoted in Williams.

=== Staff and ticket ===
Using only a single token does not provide convenient operation when consecutive trains are to be worked in the same direction. The simple token system was therefore extended: if one train was to be followed by another in the same direction, the driver of the first train was required to be shown the token, but not take possession of it (in theory he was supposed to physically touch the token, but this was not strictly followed). The driver was given a written authority to enter the single line section, referred to as the ticket. The train could then proceed, and a second train could follow. In the earliest days, the second train could proceed after a designated time interval, as on double lines at the time. However, after the Armagh rail disaster of 1889, block working became mandatory.

Seeing the train staff provided assurance that there could be no head-on collision. To ensure that the ticket was not issued incorrectly, a book of numbered tickets was kept in a locked box, the key to which was permanently fastened to the token, or was the token. In addition, the lock prevented the token from being removed until the ticket box was closed, and it could not be closed unless the book of tickets was in the box. Once a ticket was issued, its number was recorded in a Train Register book, and the token was locked in a secure place. The system is known as staff and ticket.

In a variation on that principle, called divisible train staff, a section of the token or staff, referred to as the ticket portion, was designed to be removed and handed to the driver, instead of a paper ticket.

=== Electric token ===
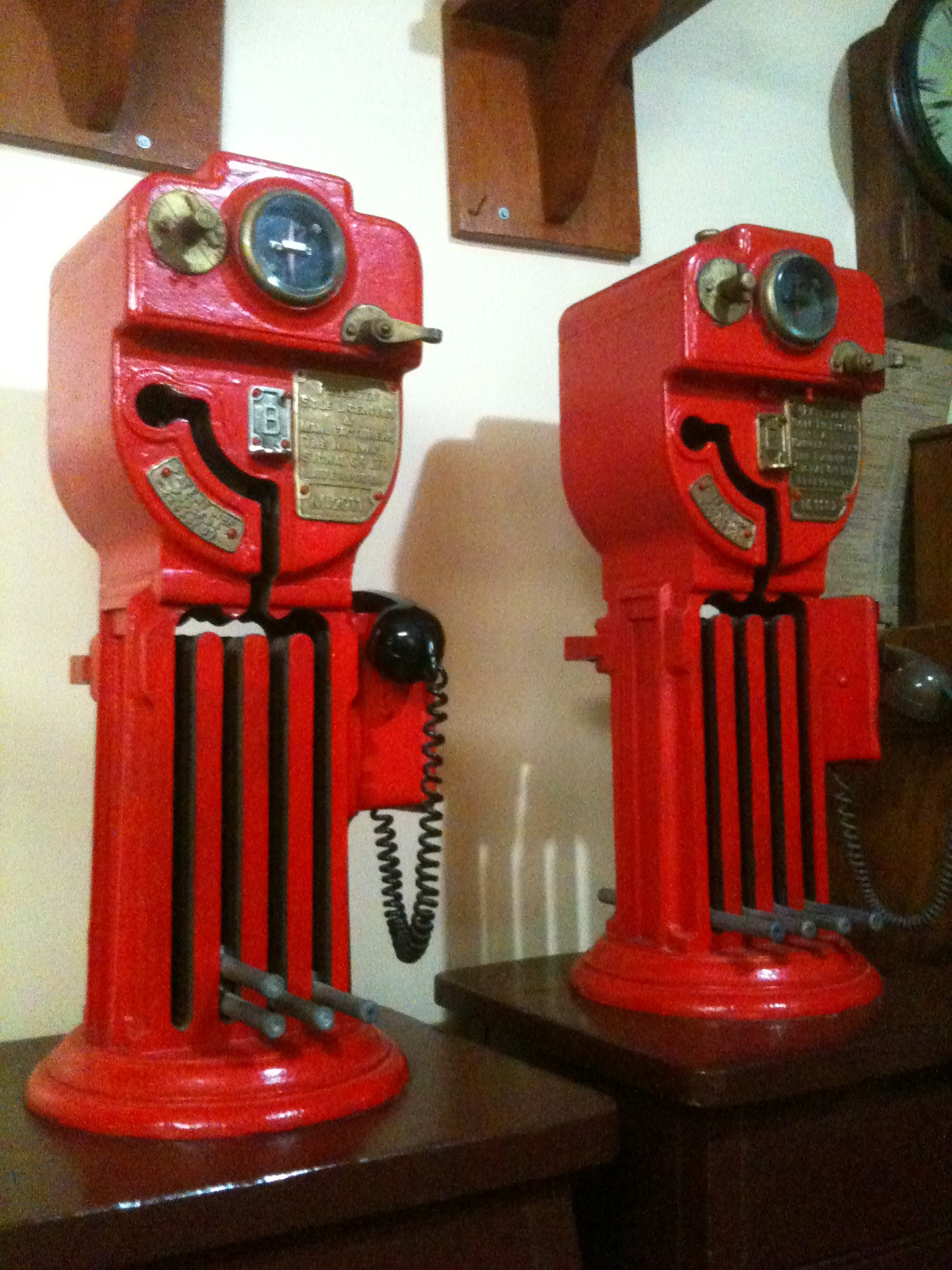
Electric staff instruments manufactured by Webb and Thompson

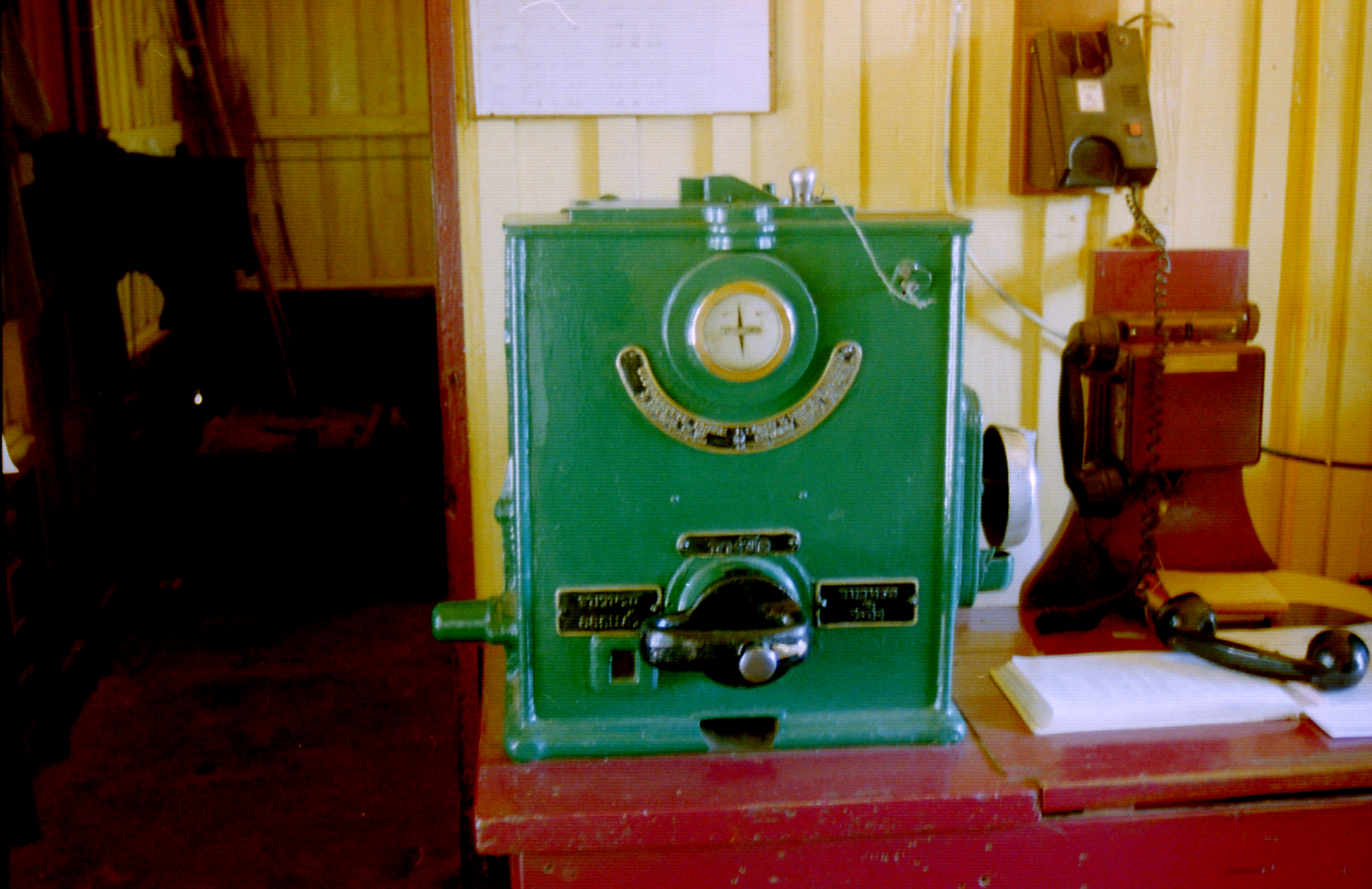
Neale's token instrument manufactured by Westinghouse Brake & Signal Co.

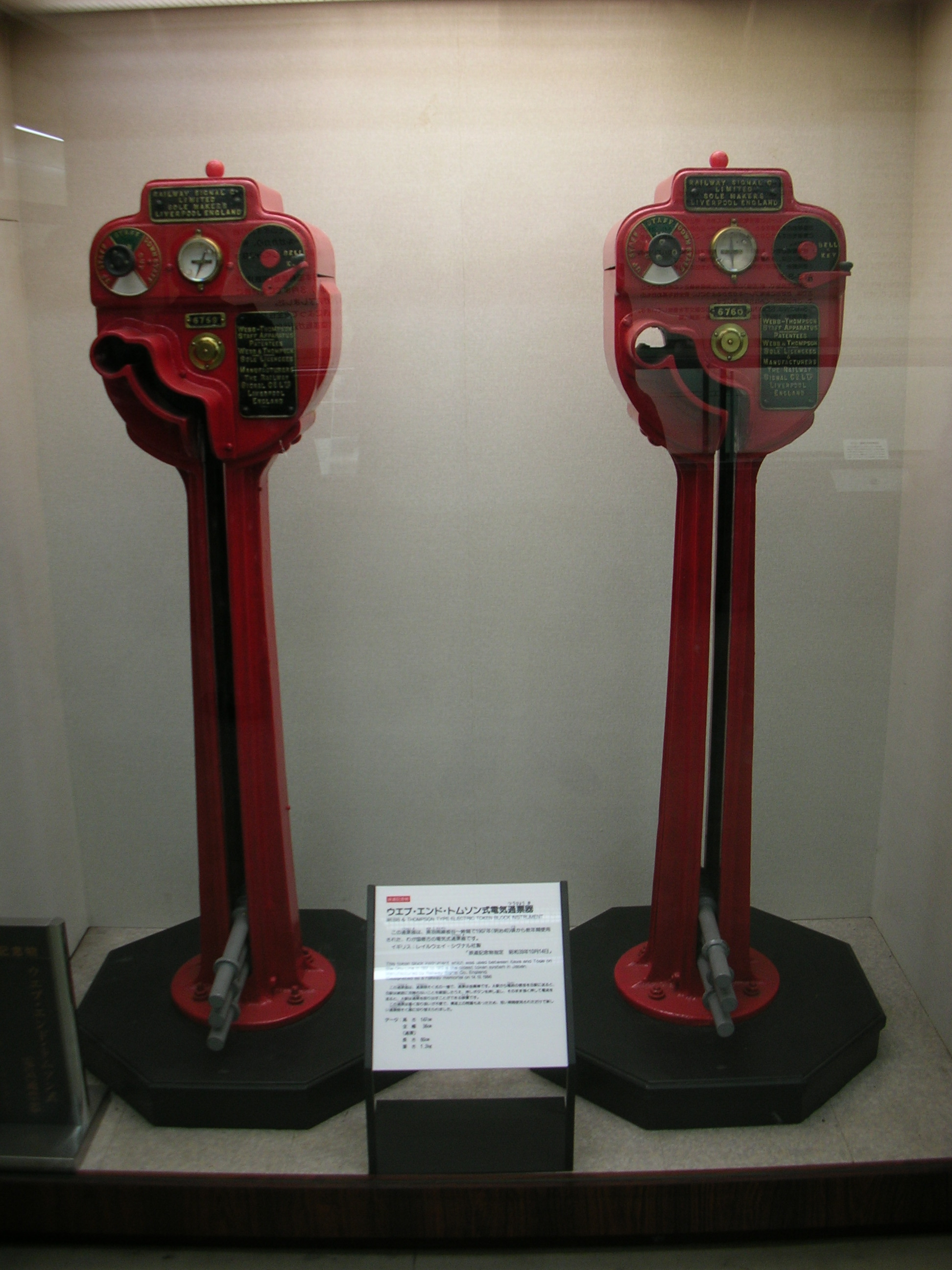
Webb and Thompson large staff instruments used in Japan at the Railway Museum

The staff and ticket system was still too inflexible for busy lines, as it did not allow for the situation where the train intended to carry the actual token was cancelled or running very late. To provide for this, the electric train token system was developed. Each single-line section is provided with a pair of token instruments, one at the signal box at each end. A supply of identical tokens is stored in the instruments, which are connected by telegraph lines. A token can be removed from one instrument only if both signalmen co-operate in agreeing to the release. Once a token has been removed, another cannot be removed until the token which is "out" is replaced in either instrument. (There are variations on this sequence of events.) By this means, it can be ensured that at any one time, only one token is available to be issued to a driver. Tokens belonging to adjacent sections have different configurations to prevent them being inserted into the wrong instrument.

Nevertheless, a head-on collision occurred on a section of single track on the Cambrian Railways on 18 January 1918. The drivers of both engines held the correct token, issued from Tyer's token machines as they started their respective journeys, but the electrical circuits linking the machines at either end were also used for telephones and, together with a possible line fault caused by bad weather, this allowed the issue of two tokens at the same time. In the Abermule train collision of 1921, also on the Cambrian Railways, lax working procedures allowed the safeguards provided by the electric token system to be circumvented; a driver was handed a token for the wrong section, and proceeded on the mistaken belief that the token was correct. To try to prevent this, the UK Board of Trade Railway Inspectorate recommended that the signals controlling entry to the single line section (starting or section signals) were locked at danger unless a token had been released from the relevant token instrument. This was not universally adopted and many single line sections continued without such safeguards well into the 1960s.

== Collection of the token ==
In a basic railway situation, the token can be collected personally by the driver at the start of the crew's work on a branch line, and surrendered at the end of their work there.

Where the single line section is part of a through route, then it is likely that each passing train would require to surrender and collect a token at each token station. Where the trains stop at every station this is a convenient arrangement, but where some trains run through without requiring to make a call (i.e. express trains), it was necessary for the signalman to exchange tokens with the fireman (in the case of steam trains) as the train passed at slow speed. In the case of driver-only operated trains, a dead-mans hold over button was provided, so the driver could exchange the token without the emergency brake being applied.

A large staff could be handed over without any special apparatus, but if the system in use employed miniature staffs, tablets or key tokens, these were usually placed in a leather pouch attached to a hoop, and the fireman could put their arm through the hoop held up by the signalman, and vice versa as the locomotive ran past. In UK practice the permitted speed for this was 15 mph (24 km/h) in daylight, but there are stories of drivers anxious to make up lost time when running late, and passing the exchange point at much higher speeds; bruised upper arms were common among signalmen and firemen on such lines.

Fixed token exchange apparatus was used on some railways. Trackside equipment was fitted near each signal box to hold the pouch containing the token and to receive the token pouch that was being given up.

=== Automatic exchange ===
Certain railways developed mechanical systems that enabled faster handover using catcher devices. These could be extended from the locomotive cabside just before the train passed the exchange point and then automatically retracted afterwards. These enabled handover speeds of 40 mph (64 km/h). Examples of such systems include the Whitaker system on the Somerset & Dorset Joint Railway and the Manson system on the Midland & Great Northern Joint Railway and the Great North of Scotland Railway. When the Aberdeen to Inverness passenger service was converted to diesel multiple unit operation in the late 1950s, the train-borne equipment was fixed adjacent to the train guard's compartment. A special buzzer code confirmed to the guard that the correct token had been successfully received.

Mechanical staff exchangers were also used where trains did not stop on the single line sections of the Main South, Main North and North Coast lines of the New South Wales Government Railways in Australia. On the Victorian Railways automatic staff exchangers survived on the North Eastern, Western, and Geelong-Ballarat lines until as recently as the late 1980s. On the South Australian Railways, auto staff exchangers were used on the former broad-gauge line between Adelaide and Port Pirie. In all these Australian states, both steam and later diesel electric locomotives were fitted with auto exchangers. On the New Zealand Railways, where most lines are single track, multiple systems were used like the Winter’s block system and Sykes’ lock and block working. On the North Island Main Trunk and on other lines like the Wairarapa Line, the Tyer’s Electric Train Tablet with the No. 7 instrument was used. Tablet exchangers were developed by Wynne after trials of the Australian design by Quirke. The tablet system allowed for banking engines used for steep sections with a separate bank engine key.

== Electronic token systems ==
Advances in technology led to the development of electronic token systems. Trains are able to run over consecutive single-track sections, with the operation being controlled by radio from a central control room. Every train carries an electronic unit that receives and sends an encrypted block of data which represents the token. The system is designed so that the control centre cannot issue a new token for a section of line until the current one is 'returned'. Trains cannot send tokens to each other. This system allows the whole line to operate without any additional signalling personnel, and has functioned without major incident.

The Ternkey System (derived from an acronym for "token exchange using random numbers") is a hybrid between conventional token working and internet technology. Conventional "trapped key" pin tumbler locks (held in fixed position by solenoids) are mounted in key-release units set up at each end of controlled single line. The number of locks in each unit is determined by the expected traffic frequency; optionally at times short sections may be combined to reduce the number of stops. The units are connected to a central control computer by internet. The central computer conducts a "census" of keys before releasing a solenoid and freeing a key for the required section of track—an engraved tag identifying the respective section of track is securely attached to the relevant key. The system is in use on the Isle of Man Railway between Castletown and Port Erin.

== Variations ==
=== Intermediate block posts ===
In certain circumstances it was convenient to shorten the single line sections by providing an intermediate signal box equipped with token instruments without providing a passing loop there. This was done if there was, for example, an important siding connection at the intermediate location. It also enabled following through trains to run at closer headways, but did not facilitate opposing movements.

Because of the greater risk of collision in the event of irregular working, the practice was deprecated in the UK, although some examples did exist for example at Beddington Lane on the Wimbledon – West Croydon line before resignalling. Usually in such cases special interlocking was provided between the two instruments at the intermediate signal box to ensure that trains could not be accepted from opposing directions at the same time.

A disaster at such an intermediate location occurred on the Somerset & Dorset Joint Railway at Foxcote, near Radstock, in the Foxcote collision of 1876. This occurred before the S&DJR was equipped for token working and was relying on block instruments only – a catalogue of errors led to two passenger trains entering the same section from opposite ends.

=== Long section working ===
In double line working, at times when traffic is light it is convenient to "switch out" an intermediate signal box, allowing the signal boxes on either side to communicate directly for train control. On single lines this is more complicated because of the train tokens being identified with single line sections, but the difficulty can be overcome by some form of long section working.

A simple system used separable train staffs which fit together when intermediate block posts are closed, so that a driver receives the train staff for two or more consecutive sections from the first signalman. An alternative system employs special long-section token systems; when long section working is to be instituted, all the short section tokens must be in their respective instruments; by switching to the long-section method, tokens for the long section can then be obtained in the ordinary way. Obviously all the long-section tokens must be restored before the normal working can be resumed.

=== Unattended operation ===
Token instruments can be arranged for unattended operation, when they are operated by the train crew at intermediate crossing loops or at the terminus of the line. This system is widely found in Australia, where traffic density on many lines is low.

In the UK it is known as the "No-signalman key token system". Examples on the UK national network are the North Devon Line, where the system was brought into use on 1 December 1987, the Heart of Wales Line (commissioned in 1986), the Derwent Valley Line in Derbyshire and the Liskeard to Looe line in Cornwall. On the latter, the train guard not only operates the Tyer's No.9 electric token instrument controlling the upper section of the branch, but operates the points as well. The lower section is operated on the "One Engine in Steam" principle with a simple wooden staff. Possession of the staff is required to unlock the ground frame controlling the points at Coombe Junction, where the two sections meet. There is no other signalling on the branch except to control entry and exit to and from the main line.

=== Token interlinking ===
After early experience with token systems, it became customary for the starting signal at token stations to be interlinked with the token instrument; on withdrawal of a token, the starting signal lever was released for one pull.

Sometimes an intermediate siding is provided on the single line section, and the token itself, or a key fixed to the end of it, unlocks the points for shunting there. The token is locked in the apparatus there, and the driver cannot retrieve the token until the points have been set to the through running position and locked again. In special situations where the sidings at the intermediate location are extensive, the equipment is arranged for the shunting train to be put wholly inside the sidings, clear of the main line; in this situation an intermediate token instrument can be provided, enabling the driver to surrender the token so that normal through working can take place on the single line while their train is at the sidings.

A corresponding arrangement sometimes applied where permanent way maintenance was carried out by motorised trolley. Usually this used special "occupation key" instruments which were interlocked with the normal token instruments and provided at intermediate places where the trolley might be off-tracked (or stored overnight).

=== Working by pilotman ===
A variation of the token system is working by pilotman, where the place of the token is taken by a person who is designated the pilotman. This system is instituted if there is a failure of the token apparatus, a signal failure within a single line section, or on double lines when one line is blocked and traffic is to be worked in both directions over the remaining line.

The pilotman (identified by a red armband with "PILOTMAN" in white letters) rides in the cab with the driver, or if another train is due to follow, the pilotman must issue the driver with a single line working ticket and authorise him to enter the section. The signalman must not clear the starting signal until instructed by the pilotman to do so. The pilotman must ride with the driver if it is the last train to run in that direction. Thus pilotman working is analogous to the "staff and ticket" system, described above, where the pilotman himself becomes the token and his verbal instruction is the equivalent of the ticket.

It is sometimes necessary to provide the pilotman with a personal locomotive to cater for disruptions to the service. In such a case the pilotman's locomotive is usually coupled to the front of the actual train, but practice may vary depending on local track layout, types of trains etc.

The use of a pilotman for such purposes pre-dates the use of tokens.

== Present-day use ==
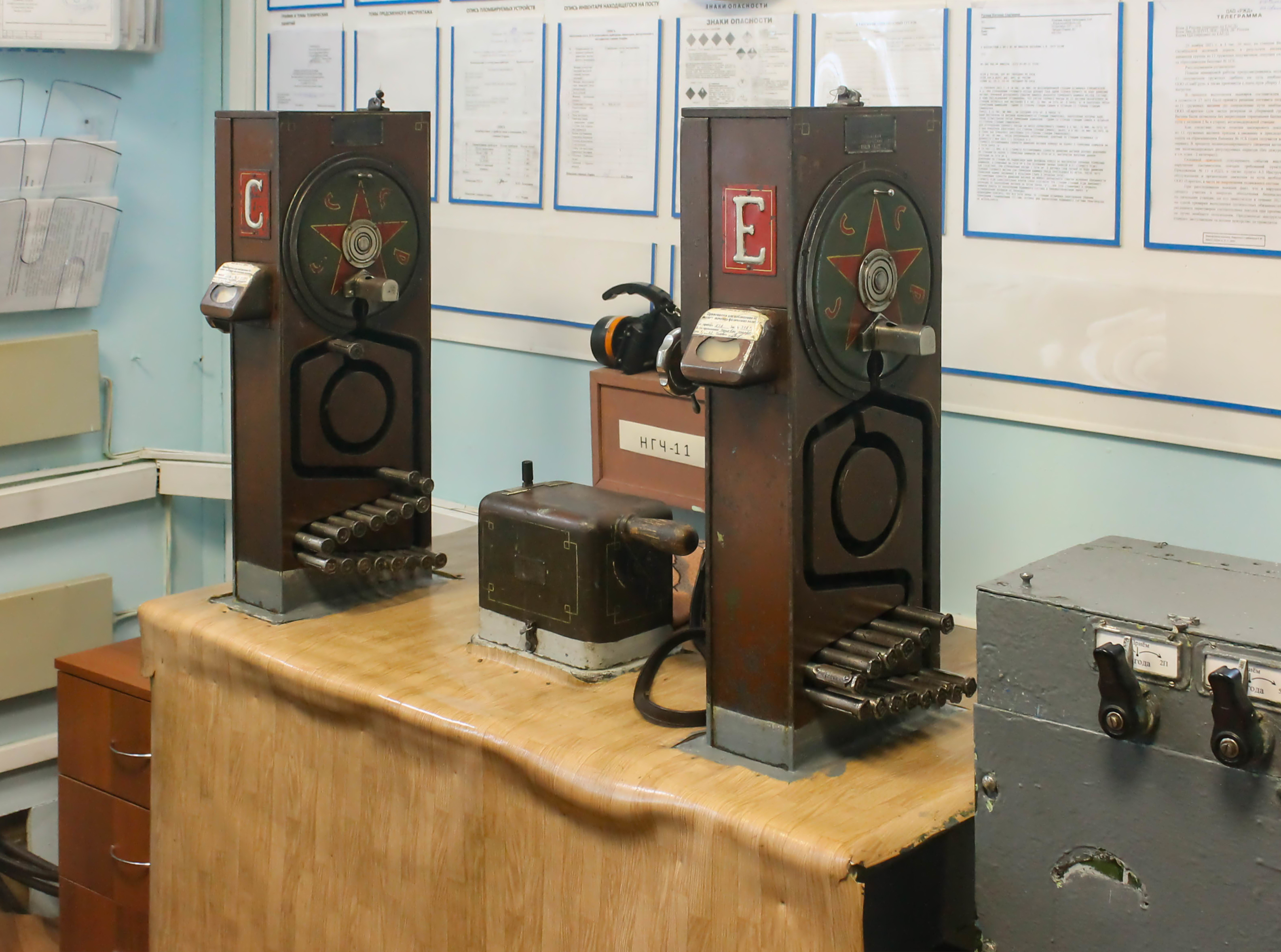
Treger token system posts at Ogaryovo railway station, Vologda Oblast, Russia

Until the late 20th century, the token system was standard on British single-track lines and it still remains on a number of lines, such as the line between Girvan and Stranraer in south west Scotland, as well as the Marlow branch line in southeast England. It also remains in use on the Yeovil Pen Mill to Maiden Newton section of the Bristol to Weymouth line. Traditional token systems are also in use on heritage railways in Britain, for example on the Mid Hants Railway and the West Somerset Railway which is fitted throughout with Tyer's electric token instruments. The Bluebell Railway has short section token working between adjacent boxes and long section working available between Sheffield Park and Kingscote.

The token system was in use on the Hurstbridge railway line, Melbourne, Australia between Greensborough and Eltham (Miniature Electric Staff) and Eltham and Hurstbridge (Train Staff and Ticket) until replaced by electronic signalling in early 2013. The Greensborough to Eltham section was abolished on 31 January 2013, along with half of the Eltham to Hurstbridge section, as far as Diamond Creek. The final Diamond Creek to Hurstbridge section was abolished on 22 March 2013.

The Puffing Billy Railway in Melbourne, Victoria, has used a staff and ticket system since it was originally opened from Upper Ferntree Gully to Gembrook. The current line from Belgrave to Gembrook has permanent staff stations at Belgrave, Menzies Creek, Lakeside and Gembrook. A temporary staff station exists at Emerald town to allow trains to pass at Emerald on busy days. For the Emerald temporary staff to be activated, the Menzies Creek to Lakeside staff is required to be locked away at Menzies Creek. A similar situation occurs with Cockatoo station, whereby for it to be enacted as a Temporary Staff Station, the Lakeside to Gembrook staff is required to be locked away at Lakeside.

The token method of working is sometimes still used for temporary situations such as through engineering works or where the signalling system has yet to be provided. In December 1981, a new underground line was opened in Melbourne, which provided a circular service around the city's central business district. Although normal services were not to begin for some time, for two months special services operated on Sundays to allow people to try the new line, and for this period the line operated with a train staff, although there was no provision for tickets to be used.

A very unusual token working was instituted on the line between Pakenham and Traralgon in Victoria, Australia for several months in 2006 whilst the line was being upgraded. During this period, the line was closed during the day, but opened each night to allow a few goods trains through. The line is double track between Pakenham and Moe (except for a short single track section). Three staffs were provided for the 100 km length, one each for the sections Pakenham—Warragul, Warragul—Moe, and Moe—Traralgon. The first two of these are partly or totally double-track sections, but the staffs in this case were applicable to both tracks, the effect being that only one of the tracks could be used at a time.

Staff working was still in use in New South Wales on the single-line Kiama-Nowra (Bomaderry) section of the South Coast line until 2014, with full-time attended stations at Bomaderry, Berry, and Kiama. This section has always carried frequent traffic and was at the time that staff-working ended, host to hourly railcar passenger service and 3-4 heavy goods movements per day as well as special heritage movements.

The token system is still regularly used on the present-day State Railway of Thailand system. Although most use occurs in regional areas, some use appears in the capital city, Bangkok, such as the Makkasan to Khlong Tan section etc.

Sri Lanka Railways uses a tablet exchanging system on the up-country railway line.

Russian Railways uses Electric Token Block on some lines, most notably the Yanisyarvi – Lodeynoe Pole railway.

The electric staff instruments manufactured by Webb and Thompson shown in the picture above are in use on the Buenos Aires (Constitución Station) to Mar del Plata line (Ferrocarril Roca) in Argentina, as of 2019.

The token system is also used on the Seaton tramway between Seaton and Riverside and on the running lines of some tram museums.

In Malaysia, signaling token signs are still used on the KTM East Coast Line between Gemas and Tumpat. Although Gemas Station mainly serves the Electric Train Service, it still receive tokens from trains arriving from Bahau Station on the East Coast Line. Similarly, the Gemas Station Master needs to pass a key token for trains bound for the East Coast. The final token exchange normally happens at Tumpat and Gemas but this also happens at Kuala Lipis and Dabong as these two stations are the terminus of some Eastern Shuttle (SH) train services. This system was officially abolished on KTM's West Coast Line following the completion of the Ipoh - Padang Besar Electrified Double Track Project in 2014.

== Other names ==
Various railways use different names for the same things:

=== New South Wales ===
- Ordinary Train Staff (OTS)
- Ordinary Train Staff and Ticket (OTST)
- Electric Train Staff (ETS)
- Pilot Staff

== See also ==
- Annett's key
- Radio Electronic Token Block
- Signalling block systems
- Single-line working
- Tyers Electric Train Tablet
