= Dark territory =

Section of railway without signals

Dark territory is a term used in the North American railroad industry to describe a section of running track not controlled by signals. Train movements in dark territory were previously handled by timetable and train order operation, but since the widespread adoption of two way radio communications these have been replaced by track warrants and direct traffic control, with train dispatchers managing train movements directly. Today most dark territory consists of lightly used secondary branch lines and industrial tracks with speeds ranging between 25 miles per hour (40 km/h) and 40 miles per hour (64 km/h); however, there do exist a small minority of main lines that fall into the category.

In the UK and Australia the term applies to rail track where the signalling system does not pass the signal indications nor track occupancy back to a signal box. As such the position of trains is not visible to signallers, and so the track is "dark".

== Safety concerns ==
The primary safety concerns with dark territory stems from the lack of any form of direct or indirect train detection along the route. Train detection systems such as track circuits not only alert other trains to the presence of a potential hazard, but can also alert dispatchers or other monitoring systems to the same. Dark territory also lacks the ability to control or lock switches onto the main track, detect misaligned switches, broken rails or runaway rail cars. In most cases these drawbacks are mitigated by the light traffic and low speed of the trains in dark territory, but a runaway train (such as the crude oil unit train in 2013's Lac-Mégantic derailment) will not respect limits on speed and is not detectable by rail traffic controllers on a line with no signals or track circuits.

The total reliance on manual procedures to ensure safety has occasionally resulted in train wrecks, some with fatalities, due to either miscommunication or oversight on the part of operating personnel. In 1948 the Interstate Commerce Commission set a nationwide speed limit of 60 miles per hour (97 km/h) for trains not protected by some kind of block system (including manual block and track warrants) and in 2012 this was expanded to include all lines considered dark territory. Since 1991 the National Transportation Safety Board (NTSB) had recommended that railroads be required to install new forms of signaling technology, such as positive train control (PTC), that can stop trains from exceeding their procedural authorities and warn them of improperly lined switches. The Rail Safety Improvement Act of 2008 and subsequent amendments requiring installation of PTC technology on parts of the U.S. rail network by December 31, 2018, may eliminate many sections of currently dark territory.

== See also ==
- General Code of Operating Rules
- Glossary of rail transport terms
- North American railway signaling
- Runaway train
