= Track Warrant Control =

Set of instructions to a train crew

A track warrant is a set of instructions issued to a train crew authorizing specific train movements. The system is widely used in North America. The warrant is issued by the train dispatcher and delivered to the train crew via radio. The train crew copies the instructions onto a pre-printed paper form and reads back the warrant to ensure that nothing was misunderstood.

== Operation ==
Track warrants are issued granting main track use between two named points (i.e. milepost sign, station, or any fixed physical point, such as a switch). The dispatcher may also issue time constraints (known as "Box 6" on a standard form), although the track warrants remain in effect until cleared by a member of the receiving crew. Track warrants are sometimes used in conjunction with a block signal system to provide rear-end protection against following trains.

Track warrants usually allow a train to move in one direction only—a "proceed" instruction. Sometimes a train may also be given authorizing movements in either direction, called a "work between" instruction. However, only one train can have a section of track at one particular time if moving in the same direction. If there are two trains moving in the same direction, the leading train must give up the track before the trailing train can obtain a track warrant for that territory. For example, if Train 56 has a track warrant to proceed in the northbound direction from MP (milepost) 14 to MP 77 and there is a train following, then Train 56 must give up a portion or all of its warrant before the following train can be issued the track that Train 56 has already cleared. Many times this is accomplished by the dispatcher asking the leading train for their milepost location and then issuing a warrant up to that point to the trailing train. Continuing the previous example, if Train 56 is clear of MP 50, the dispatcher can issue a warrant to the trailing train up to MP 50, but not beyond it. Once a train has received a new track warrant or has left track warrant territory they will release the entirety of their warrant back to the dispatcher.

Maintenance of way crews receive track bulletins (usually called "Form A", "Form B" or "Form C") in order to perform track work that would otherwise be interrupted by passing trains. This is done by providing the maintenance crew with a form or protection, or allowing work to be done behind a passing train.

=== Comparison with Direct Traffic Control ===
Track Warrant Control is similar to yet distinct from the concept of Direct Traffic Control (DTC), appearing later as railroads migrated fully from older forms of train order operation. DTC was designed to facilitate the movement of trains using concepts of blocks and sidings previously used with train orders. DTC is only a mechanism to transfer movement authority and can work only within an arrangement of predefined blocks. Track warrant systems appropriate the remaining responsibility of train order systems to notify operating personnel of safety directives that include things like temporary speed restrictions, tracks out of service, etc. and combines them with the movement authority function of DTC. Furthermore, track warrants are not limited to fixed blocks and can be issued and released from almost any explicitly identified landmark along the rail line.

== Standard instructions used in track warrants ==
Most track warrants in the U.S. follow a standard form as suggested by the General Code of Operating Rules, consisting of several standard instructions to mark specific notes or conditions for a warrant. These vary from temporary speed restrictions to rules regarding meeting other trains.

- Box 1. Void on a previous warrant.
- Box 2. Proceed from point to point.
- Box 3. Proceed from point to point (cont.)
- Box 4. Work between certain limits.
- Box 5. Not in effect until ____ .
- Box 6. Authority expires at ____ .
- Box 7. Not in effect until after the arrival of ____ at ____ .
- Box 8. Hold main track at last named point.
- Box 9. Do not foul limits ahead of ____ .
- Box 10. Clear main track at last named point.
- Box 11. Between ____ and ____ make all movements at restricted speed: limits occupied by train.
- Box 12. Between ____ and ____ make all movements at restricted speed: limits occupied by men or equipment.
- Box 13. Do not exceed ____ mph between _____ and ____ .
- Box 14. Do not exceed ____ mph between _____ and ____ .
- Box 15. Flag protection not required against following trains on same track.
- Box 16. Track bulletins in effect.
- Boxes 17 and 18: Other specific instructions.

Some railroad systems, such as RailAmerica, use additional boxes:

- Box 18. Joint with _____ between ____________ and _____________ .
- Box 19. Expect to find the following switch(es) lined and locked in the reverse position: _________ .
- Box 20. The following switch(es) may be left lined and locked in the reverse position: _________ .

Non-GCOR Track Warrant systems include the NORAC Form D Control System (DCS) which was later partly adopted by CSX to supplant its older DTC system.

== Use of track warrants on specific railroads ==
The BNSF Railway uses track warrants on its El Paso Subdivision which runs from Belen, New Mexico, to El Paso, Texas, with the dispatcher in Fort Worth, Texas. There are no electrical signals on the route. BNSF also uses track warrant control (TWC) between Williams (Seligman Subdivision) and Phoenix, Arizona (Phoenix Subdivision), Forsyth Subdivision between Jones Junction (a suburb of Billings, Montana) and Hysham, Montana. Unlike the El Paso Subdivision, automatic block signaling (ABS) is used. And on the Madill Subdivision between Denison and Irving, Texas, with an ABS signal overlay on the northern ten or so miles between Denison and Sherman, Texas. Track warrant control is also used in many other low- to medium-traffic sections of the BNSF system, sometimes with an ABS overlay, and on the other Class I railroads as well. Some smaller Class II railroads, such as the Iowa Interstate Railroad, and many Class III railroads are dispatched completely by track warrant.

Canadian railways use a similar system called occupancy control system (OCS), in which movements are controlled via clearances issued over the radio from the rail traffic controller to the train. The system is in wide use on lines that are not installed with centralized traffic control (CTC).

The New South Wales Country Regional Network (CRN) uses electronic track warrants (train orders) on 2,400 km of track. Functionality includes proximity warnings and out-of-authority alarms to improve drivers' situation awareness.

The Australian Rail Track Corporation uses track warrants on several thousand kilometres of single-track line.

KiwiRail in New Zealand also uses track warrants; in 2008 they were required on 2,255 km (1,401 mi), or 56% of KiwiRail's tracks.

== See also ==
- Dark territory (North American terminology for unsignaled tracks)
- Direct traffic control
- Radio Electronic Token Block
- Rail terminology
- Train order
