= Annett's key =

Safety device for railway signalling

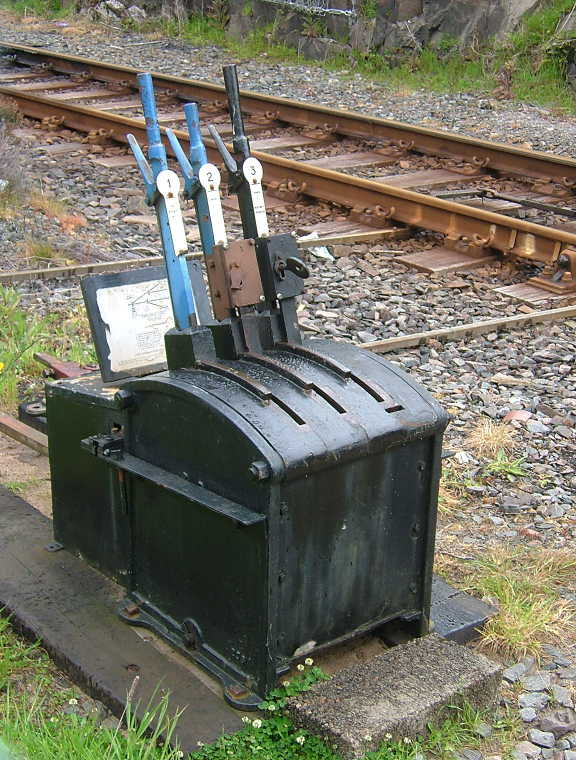
Groundframe, with the two rightmost levers locked by Annett's key

In British, Australian, French, and Swiss railway signalling, an Annett's key is a form of trapped-key interlocking that locks levers or other items of signalling apparatus, thereby serving as a portable form of interlocking. A typical use is to prevent access from sidings to the running line without authority. When not in use, the key is normally held in an Annett's lock that is fixed to the lever or concerned apparatus.

== History ==
The Annett's key takes its name from its inventor, James Edward Annett of the London, Brighton and South Coast Railway. Annett patented his design in 1875; in 1881, that patent was bought out by Saxby and Farmer.

== Operation ==
Annett locking is simple in principle. Two (or more) locks are keyed identically and are constructed such that the key can only be removed from the lock when it is locked. As only one key is provided, only one of the locks can be unlocked at any one time.

A typical application in British usage was to secure a set of points that were too far from a signal box to be operated directly from the interlocking frame. The Annett key would normally be kept in a lock on the lever working the signal protecting the points. Removal of the Annett key secured the lever normal and the signal at stop. The key could then be taken to the points and used to unlock them for operation. When shunting was finished, the key was returned to the signal box and the signal lever unlocked.

Other uses are possible. The key may be attached to the train staff for the section of running line to release points accessing intermediate sidings. This prevents an unsafe situation if a train shunting at the siding departs without securing the points for main line running. At manually-worked level crossings remote from signal boxes, the key to the gates can only be removed for use when the signals for the running line are locked at danger.

In modern Australian usage, where Token working has largely been replaced by Train Order working, loose Annett keys can be provided to be carried by trains to unlock intermediate sidings.

== See also ==
- Glossary of rail transport terms
