= Direct traffic control =

Direct traffic control (DTC) is a system for authorizing track occupancy used on some railroads instead of or in addition to signals. It is known as "direct" traffic control because the train dispatcher gives track authority directly to the train crew via radio, as opposed to through wayside personnel via telephone or telegraph, as in train orders.

== Layout ==
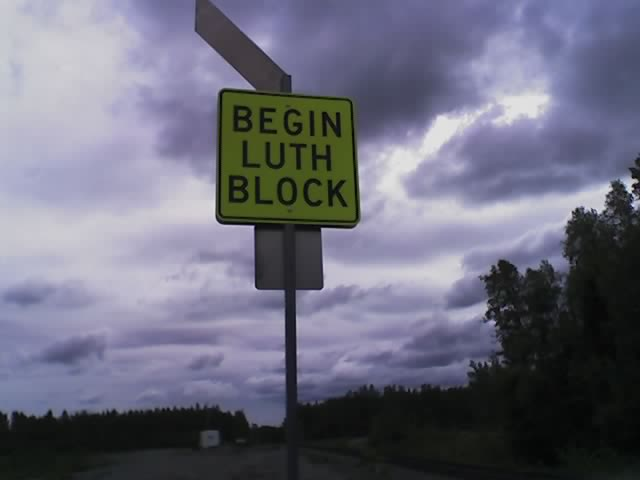
A DTC block sign for the Luthman block on the Alaska Railroad.

In DTC, controlled tracks and sidings (those requiring authority from the train dispatcher to occupy) are divided into pre-specified blocks. In addition to being listed by milepost in the railroad's timetable, block limits are delineated by conspicuous signs along the tracks. Every portion of controlled track belongs to a block, as blocks are laid out back-to-back along the entire length of the rail line.

For example, a 30-mile (48 km) length of main line track may be divided into three blocks, Anna, Bess, and Cloy, each 10 miles (16 km) long. At milepost 10, there will be a sign displaying the end of Anna block and the beginning of Bess block, and a similar sign between Bess and Cloy. A train authorized in Anna through Bess blocks must stop before Bess block ends and Cloy block begins.

For example, a length of track may consist of three blocks. Anna, Bess, and Cloy. There is a siding at Bess, and this siding is specified as Bess Siding. Both Bess and Bess Siding blocks extend to the switches at either end of the siding. Anna and Cloy blocks begin on the other side of their respective switches. Neither Bess nor Bess Siding blocks may be occupied without authority from the train dispatcher.

In this example, a train may have authority straight through from Anna through Cloy. Or, it could have authority in Anna through Bess Siding, in which case it must throw the switch between Anna and Bess and enter the siding - this will usually be done to clear the main track for an opposing train to pass. After clearing its authority in Anna siding and the opposing train passes, it might then get authority from Bess Siding through Cloy, in which case it will throw the switch between Bess and Cloy and reenter the main track.

Lengths of DTC blocks vary, but usually take about 10 minutes to traverse. The siding itself is not considered a DTC block per se, but in some situations sidings must not be occupied without authority from the train dispatcher. However, in DTC territory all sidings operate as non-controlled, restricted speed track and there is no safety consideration in a train occupying it without central authority to do so. For traffic flow purposes the dispatcher needs to record which sidings are occupied. If a train could not use the main track in Bess (due to maintenance, a stuck switch, a disabled train, or an obstacle blocking the track), it would also be possible for the train to have authority from Anna through Bess Siding through Cloy. This is not done when the main track is available, as there is a speed disadvantage to having the train traverse the slower siding track (including having to stop to throw the switches to enter the siding).

While most DTC blocks are laid out back-to-back, the blocks actually do not touch at sidings. Instead, there is a "gray area" over the siding's switches, and the main track's and siding's DTC blocks begins at approximately the clearance point of the switch. The area over the switch must not be occupied unless authority is granted in blocks on both sides of the switch. For example, a train authorized only in Anna block must stop at the End Anna Block sign, which is a short distance from the switch points. A train authorized in Anna through Bess or in Anna through Bess Siding may proceed past the End Anna Block sign, over the switch, and then past the Begin Bess (or Bess Siding, as applicable) Block sign.

Blocks are typically named after a distinguishing feature within the block, such as a station, town, or river.

== Procedures ==
Normally, only one train or piece of equipment may occupy a given block at a time, and a train must release their authority in a block for the dispatcher to authorize another train into that block. Barring human error, this ensures that no two trains are ever authorized on any given piece of track at the same time, thereby preventing collisions. (In certain circumstances, dispatchers will authorize more than one piece of equipment—as in the case of track maintenance vehicles—into the same block. When this occurs, the authority is marked as "joint," and all movements must be made at restricted speed, which allows stopping within half the range of vision.) Another key feature of DTC is that only one authority is in effect for any given train at any given time. When a dispatcher issues a new authority to a train, the previous authority becomes invalid and must not be used.

In modern implementations, dispatchers rely on computerized systems to monitor trains that have received authority. Typically, the computer will prevent the dispatcher from giving two trains authority over the same track. The computer system generally displays a highly simplified diagram of the track, displaying the block limits and sidings. Track occupancy is displayed via bold or colored lines overlaying the track display, along with tags to identify the train (usually the number of the lead locomotive).

To receive or change a train's authority, the train dispatcher communicates by radio with the train crew and gives "mandatory directives" authorizing occupancy in a specified number of blocks. A member of the train crew, usually the conductor, copies the dispatcher's mandatory directive onto a prescribed form. The crew member will repeat the directive back to the dispatcher, who monitors the repeat for any errors. If the crew member correctly repeats the mandatory directive, the dispatcher finalizes the directive by saying, "That is correct," followed by the dispatcher's initials. A mandatory directive cannot take effect until the dispatcher has said, "That is correct," reducing the potential for human error to cause an accident.

Numbers are always repeated in an alternate format to ensure clarity and prevent misunderstandings. Numbers from zero to nine are spelled out, while numbers greater than ten are given by their individual numerals. For example, the number six would be given as, "Six, s-i-x," while the number 14 would be given as "fourteen, one-four." Engine numbers such as 2001 are usually read first as "two thousand one," while numbers such as 4321 are usually read as "forty-three twenty-one," although this is mostly a personal preference about what is easiest to say. Regardless, the repeat will give the individual numerals, as in, "Engine twenty-eight oh eight, two, eight, zero, eight."

A sample issue format would be as follows:

Train dispatcher: "This is mandatory directive to engine forty-three twenty-one, four, three, two, one, with engineer Johnson. You are authorized to proceed westward in three, t-h-r-e-e blocks, Anna through Cloy, over."

Train crew member: "This is a repeat of mandatory directive issued to the forty-three twenty-one, four, three, two, one, with engineer Johnson. We are authorized to proceed in a westward direction in three, t-h-r-e-e blocks, Anna though Cloy, over."
Dispatcher: "That is correct, S.D.K., over.
Crew: "That is correct, dispatcher S.D.K. Thanks, dispatcher, forty-three twenty-one, out."

Dispatcher. "Thanks, train dispatcher out."

When trains must meet en route, one train must be authorized into the siding. For example, train 5432 may be authorized from Anna into Bess Siding:

Train dispatcher: "This is mandatory directive to engine fifty-four thirty-two, five, four, three, two, with engineer Smith. You are authorized to proceed westward in two, t-w-o blocks, Anna through Bess Siding, over."

Train crew member: "This is a repeat of mandatory directive issued to the fifty-four thirty-two, five, four, three, two, with engineer Smith. We are authorized to proceed westward in two, t-w-o blocks, Anna through Bess Siding, over."
Dispatcher: "That is correct, S.D.K., over.
Crew: "That is correct, dispatcher S.D.K. Thanks, dispatcher, fifty-four thirty-two, out."

Dispatcher. "Thanks, train dispatcher out."

An opposing train will be authorized in two blocks, Cloy through Bess, using a similar format:

Train dispatcher: "This is mandatory directive to engine forty-three twenty-one, four, three, two, one, with engineer Johnson. You are authorized to proceed eastward in two, t-w-o blocks, Cloy through Bess, over."

Train crew member: "This is a repeat of mandatory directive issued to the forty-three twenty-one, four, three, two, one, with engineer Johnson. We are authorized to proceed eastward in two, t-w-o blocks, Cloy through Bess, over."
Dispatcher: "That is correct, S.D.K., over.
Crew: "That is correct, dispatcher S.D.K. Thanks, dispatcher, forty-three twenty-one, out."

Dispatcher: "Thanks, train dispatcher out."

Once train 5432 has fully entered the siding and restored the switch for movement along the main track, they will call the dispatcher and release Anna block, using the following format:

Train crew member: "The fifty-four thirty-two, five, four, three, two, would like to release our authority in one block, Anna, over."

Train dispatcher: "Engine fifty-four thirty-two, five, four, three, two, is releasing authority in one block, Anna, over."
Crew: "That is correct, dispatcher."
Dispatcher: "All right, thanks. Dispatcher out."

Crew: "Fifty-four thirty-two out."

After the 5432 has released its authority in Anna, the dispatcher may issue a new authority to the 4321 authorizing them through Anna block. Since only one authority is valid at any given time, if the 4321 is still in Cloy block, the dispatcher will give the new authority containing Cloy through Anna. Once the 4321 is fully within the Bess block and has cleared Cloy block, the conductor or other crew member will call the dispatcher and release Cloy. The dispatcher will then issue a new authority to the 5432, giving them authority from Bess Siding block through Cloy block. This generates additional radio traffic but ensures that there is no confusion as to which train is allowed to enter a given block at any given time. Some railroads have instituted a practice which allows a train to enter a block contingent upon the passing of the opposing train, although the National Transportation Safety Board has recommended against this practice. A DTC authority given under this practice will include a phrase such as "This line is not in effect until after the arrival of train 7940."

In the case of two trains traveling the same direction, the dispatcher will only authorize the following train in blocks that the leading train has released. In the case of closely spaced trains, the dispatcher may opt to reduce his or her workload and implement a "radio blocking behind" authority, which lets the two trains talk to each other directly to discuss which blocks the leading train has cleared. Caution must be exercised by the leading train not to release authority on track that the train still occupies, as this could result in a rear-end collision if the leading train slows down or stops or if the train becomes separated and a portion is left standing on the main track.

Entering a block in which the train is not authorized or releasing a block which the train still occupies is considered a main-line violation by the Federal Railroad Administration and carries stiff penalties for all crew members, which may include time off from work and the suspension or revocation of the engineer's license.

== Use ==
The Southern Pacific Railroad, now the Union Pacific, implemented DTC on several of its lines formerly controlled by train orders (most of the rest of UP's lines use Centralized Traffic Control). The BNSF Railway does not use DTC; it uses mostly CTC with track warrants in its non-signalled territory. The Alaska Railroad changed its Track Warrant Control territory to DTC and is also implementing CTC in high-traffic areas. Queensland Rail in Australia uses the DTC system in some of the lower traffic areas in the western area of the state. CSX uses DTC on their former Georgia railroad mainline from Scottdale, just east of Atlanta, to Augusta.

== See also ==
- Centralized traffic control
- Rail terminology
- Railway signalling
- Radio Electronic Token Block
- Track warrant
- Train order
