= Radio Electronic Token Block =

Railway signalling system

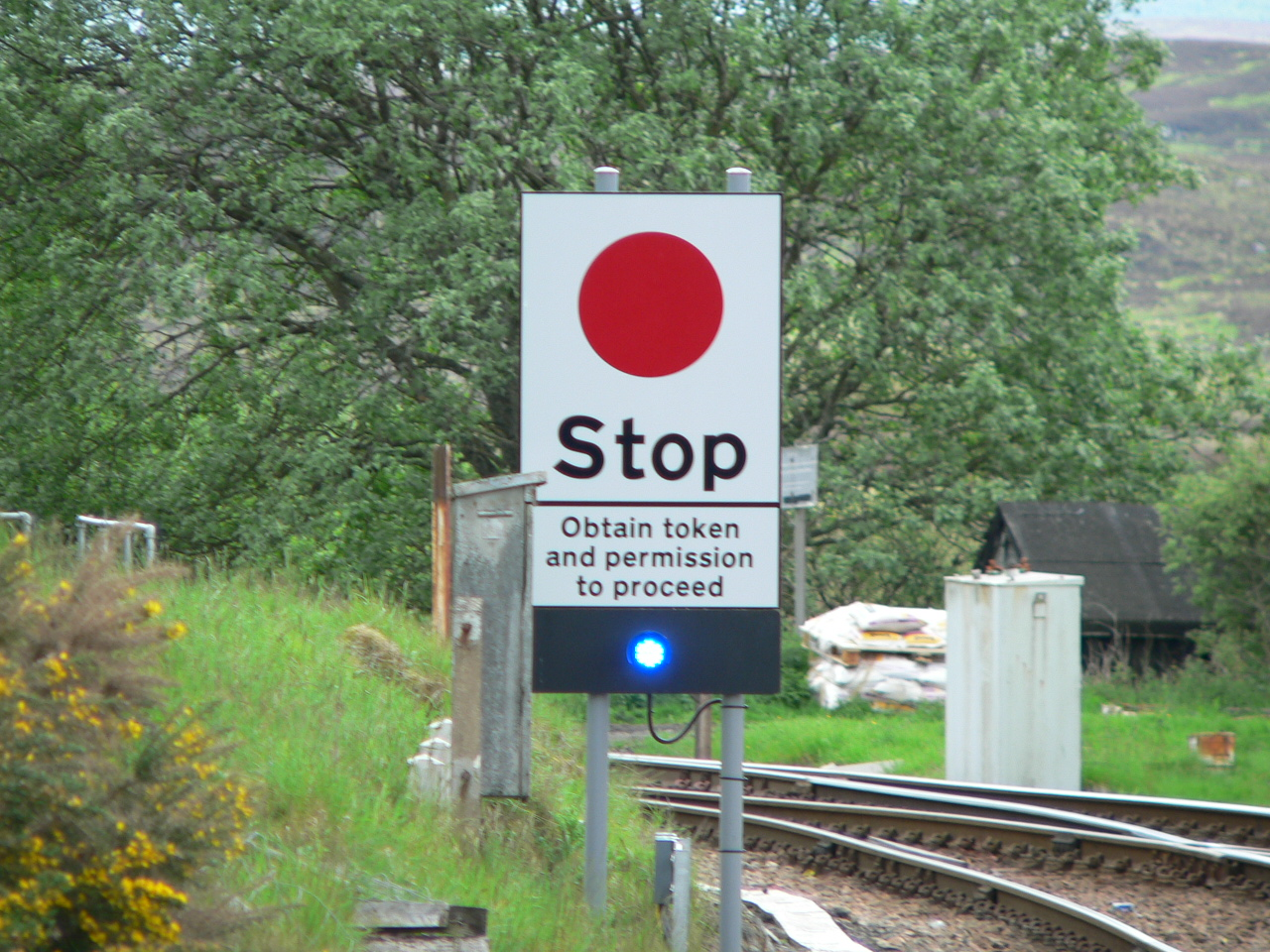
A Stop Board marking the start of a radio token section at Rannoch railway station on the West Highland Line. The blue light is a TPWS status indicator.

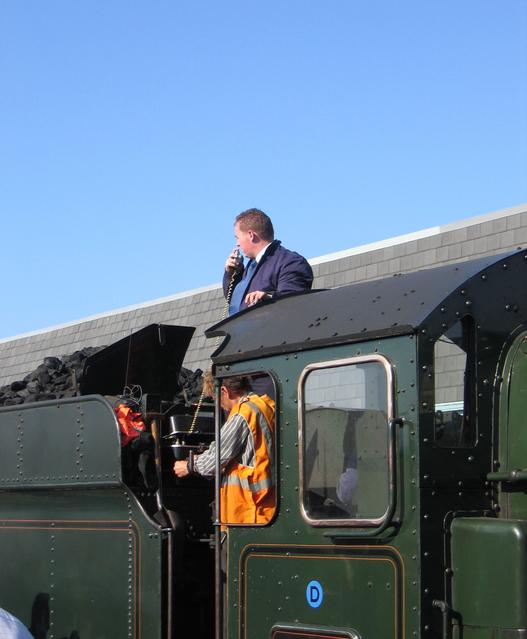
Portable equipment is available for visiting locomotives. Here Bradley Manor of the former GWR is prepared for service on the Cambrian Line, Wales.

Radio Electronic Token Block is a system of railway signalling used in the United Kingdom. It is a development of the physical token system for controlling traffic on single lines. The system is slightly similar to North American direct traffic control, which unlike RETB does not have a cab display unit.

== Operation ==
On arrival at a "token exchange point", the driver reports their position to the signaller by radio and requests the "token" for the next section of line ahead. If the signaller is in a position to do so, they will issue the electronic token applicable to the section ahead. Simultaneously, the driver must operate a button on an apparatus in the cab to receive the token. The token is then transmitted to the train by radio. The Solid State Interlocking controlling the system prevents the issue of any token permitting conflicting movements.

In the same way as with the traditional system, when a physical token with the name of the section engraved on it would be carried in the cab, the electronic token is received and displayed by name on the train equipment. This token is the authority to occupy the single line, and it cannot be removed from the train until the driver themself releases it. After confirming they have received the correct token, the driver is then given verbal permission to pass the "Stop Board" and enter that section; the stop board is used instead of signals and therefore needs no electrical supply. The fixed distant board on the approach has a single permanent AWS inductor which gives a warning in the cab regardless of the signal box instruction and has to be cancelled when passed.

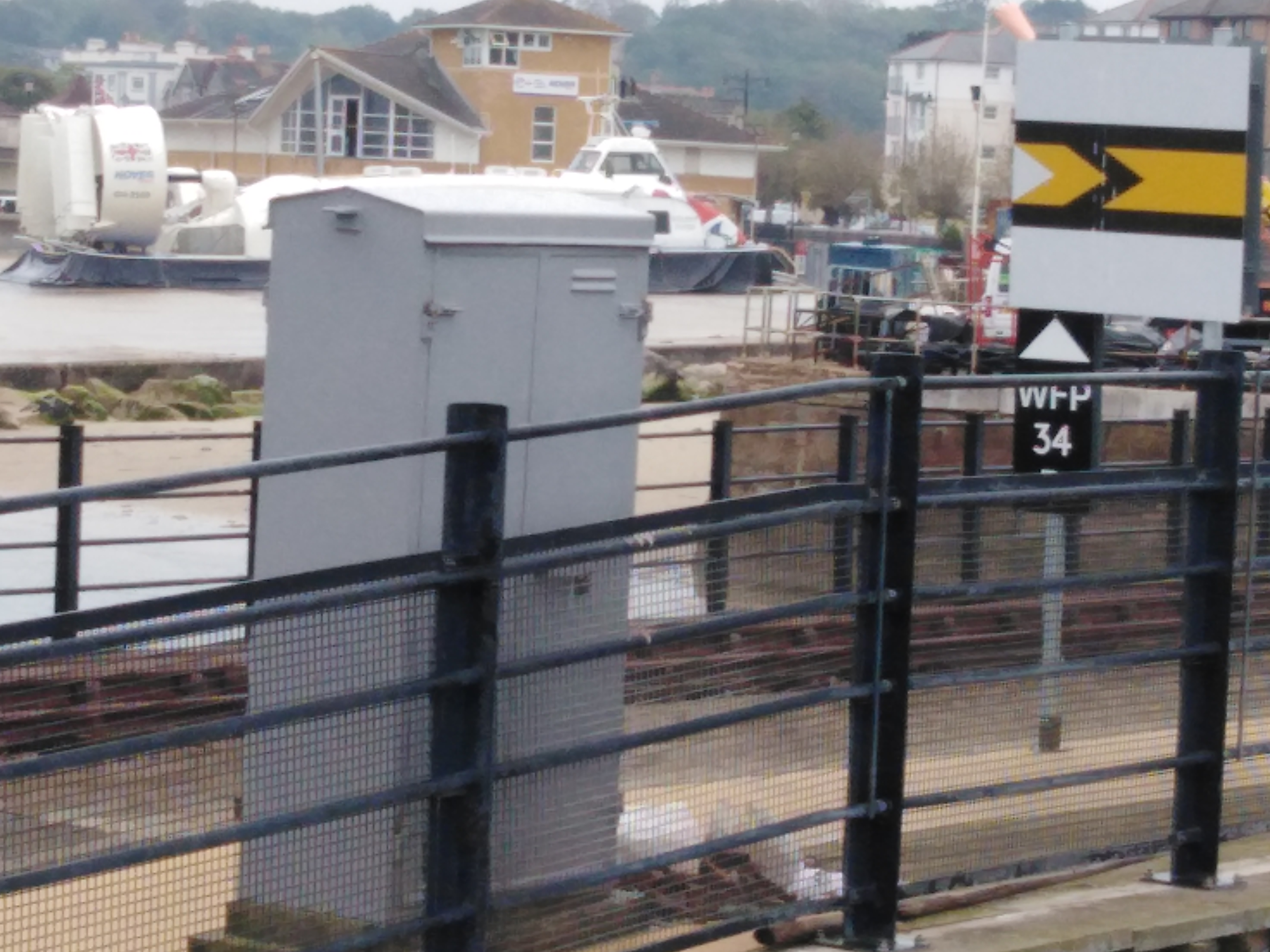
Ryde Esplanade looking south with a Fixed Distant Board in the foreground. The Signal ID is WFP (Whisky Foxtrot Papa) 34 R with a Triangle (Delta) Plate to show that it is not a stop signal. This is only to show what a Fixed distant board looks like.

Points at the entrance to a crossing loop are spring-loaded for the correct track for facing movements, and are pushed across by the wheels for trailing movements; they too require no power or interlocking, other than for points heating purposes. In the facing direction, a 'points indicator' is provided to indicate to the driver that the points are correctly set. The points indicator is in the form of a yellow light, lit only while the points are electrically detected in the required position. The whole line can be operated by just one or two signallers and needs very little infrastructure other than the track itself, making it a very cost-effective method.

The simplicity of the lineside infrastructure in RETB areas was reduced by the installation of the Train Protection & Warning System. A train stop loop is provided at each stop board, and is normally activated (so that any train attempting to pass it will be immediately brought to a halt). When the signaller issues a token for a train to enter a section, the TPWS loop at the appropriate board is deactivated, so allowing the train to proceed. Indication of the state of the TPWS is provided by a blue light mounted below the stop board. This shows a steady blue light when the TPWS is activated, and a flashing blue light when it is deactivated.

== History ==
The genesis of the system was on the Far North Line, a long, remote single-track line between Inverness, Wick and Thurso in Scotland. This line was controlled by traditional electric token instruments at each station, but in January 1978 the signal telegraph pole route was brought down by bad weather over more than forty miles of track. The simplest, cheapest and quickest way of restoring the links between the instruments was found to be by radio: each machine was fitted with an external controller containing a unique microprocessor code so that the effect of a dedicated link to the machine at the other end of its section was maintained. The manual issue of the tokens continued as before.

With the feasibility of using radio to effect the interlocking of single line token instruments demonstrated, and the additional benefit of voice communication between the signaller and the drivers noted, it was but a short step of invention to moving the instruments from staffed signal boxes to the cabs of trains. The line selected for the trial was another remote and lightly used Scottish line: the old Highland Railway route from Dingwall westwards to Kyle of Lochalsh. The contract was placed with Westinghouse of Chippenham, Wiltshire, and the system was brought into use on 28 October 1984, with the control equipment situated at Dingwall. Over the next four years, control was transferred to Inverness and the Wick and Thurso line was included in the scheme.

A new control centre was brought into use at Banavie for the West Highland Line from Helensburgh Upper to Fort William and Mallaig, and from Crianlarich to Oban. The system was also used on two other British rural lines: the East Suffolk Line, where the control centre was at Saxmundham, and the Cambrian Line from Shrewsbury to Aberystwyth and Pwllheli, where the control centre was at Machynlleth.

== The future ==
It is anticipated that RETB will eventually be replaced with the new European in-cab signalling system, ERTMS. The Cambrian Line was due to be changed over to the new system by spring 2010 but was delayed, being commissioned on 11 March 2011. The East Suffolk Line's system underwent life extension works in 2006, but was converted to conventional Track Circuit Block with axle counters in connection with increasing the service frequency to a point where the RETB could not have handled it. RETB was phased out on the East Suffolk Line after the last Ipswich-Lowestoft service arrived at Oulton Broad South on Friday 19 October 2012.

From 2014, RETB Next Generation was developed and installed.

== RETB Next Generation ==
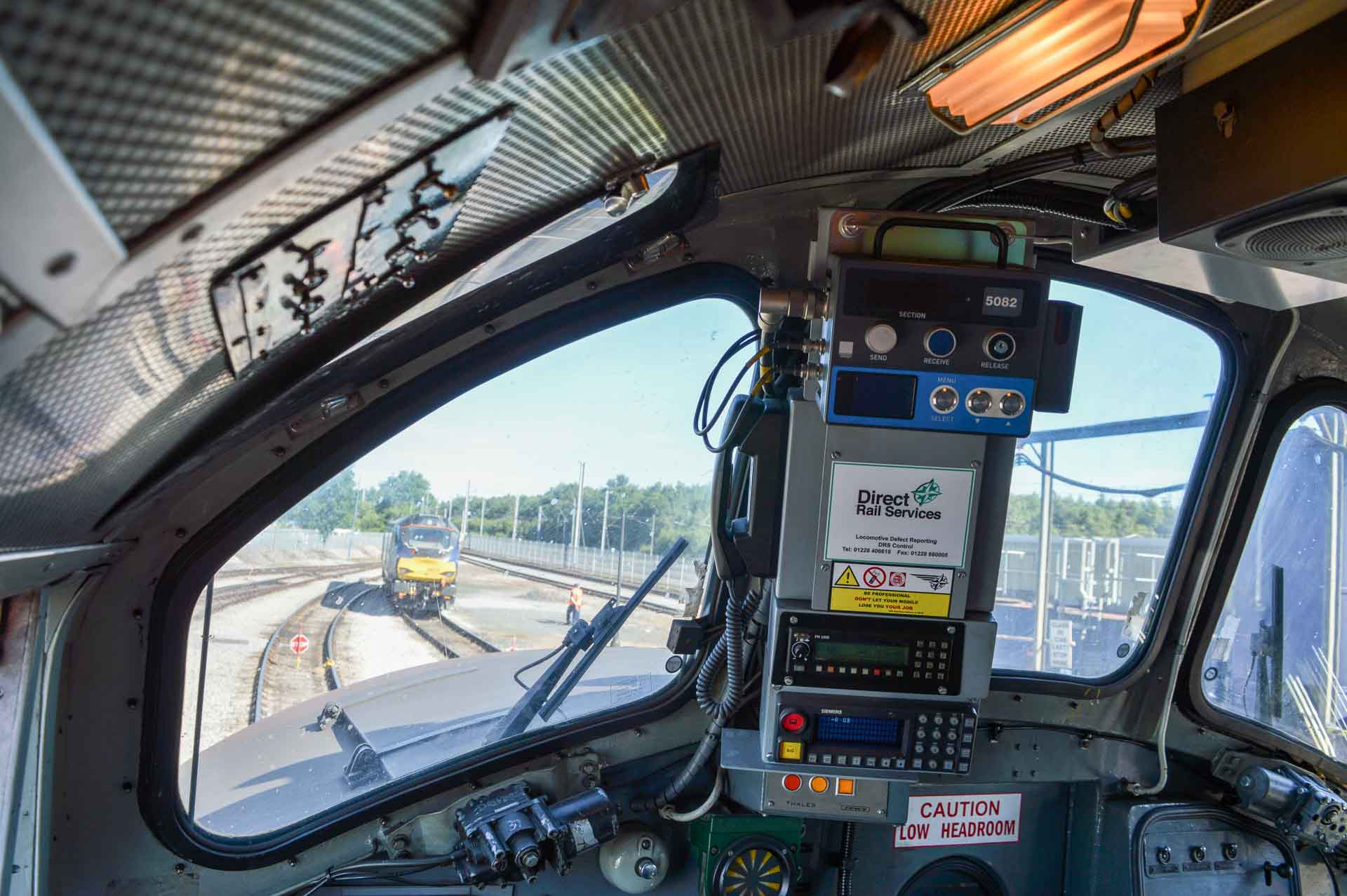
A CDR - Cab Display Radio (combined RETB Token Instrument, Radio and Control Head) installed in a Class 37 locomotive at Carlisle

Due to the loss of the Band III Sub Band 2 radio frequencies used by the NRN radio system from the digital TV spectrum reallocation the need arose for a system to replace RETB on two lines in Scotland - the West Highland Line and the Far North Line. The rugged terrain and light line traffic made it cost-prohibitive to install GSM-R for these areas and so a new radio system, with new base station and on-train equipment, was developed. This allows RETB to continue to operate on Band III Sub Band 1. RETB NG.

A number of upgrades to RETB NG have been integrated since the system was renewed, to secure its future as an effective signalling and train control system for remote and rural lines around the world. These include improved train positioning technologies that allow train protection without the need for external lineside infrastructure. A 'Request to Stop' system has been installed on the Far North Line, using the RETB radio to alert the driver of passengers on the platform.
