= Radstock rail accident =

1876 railway incident in England

Details
- Date: 7 August 1876
- Location: Foxcote, Somerset
- Coordinates: 51.302°N 2.410°W
- Country: England
- Line: Somerset and Dorset Joint Railway
- Cause: Single-line telegraphic working error

Statistics
- Trains: 2
- Deaths: 15

The Radstock rail accident took place on the Somerset and Dorset Joint Railway in south west England, on 7 August 1876. Two trains collided on a single track section, resulting in fifteen passengers being killed.

It was difficult to assign blame to any individual for the crash. The underlying cause was that the Somerset and Dorset Railway was essentially bankrupt at the time of the crash. The infrastructure was inadequate to the demands of the traffic and the staff were inadequately trained for their duties.

== Background ==
The Somerset and Dorset Joint Railway (S&D) had constructed an extension to Bath in 1874, and this had ruined the company's finances. To rescue the railway, the Midland Railway and London and South Western Railway had bought a 999-year lease on the railway and formed a new management, but had not had time to reform matters.

The extension from Evercreech to Bath was single-track. The dangers of working single track railways had long been recognised, and all sorts of safeguards (in addition to absolute block working) were supposed to be in place. However, on the single-line section between the crossing places at the stations at Radstock and Wellow, the S&D Railway had constructed a signal box at Foxcote. Ostensibly, this was to control a spur to Braysdown Colliery, but it was often used to allow two trains (travelling in the same direction) at once into the Radstock-Wellow section, in defiance of Regulations. (The Board of Trade rules laid down that only one train could occupy a single line section at any one time.) The S&D later claimed that they understood Foxcote to be a "crossing place between sections", which it clearly was not.

The existence of the Foxcote signal box complicated normal telegraphic communications. The Radstock and Wellow signalmen could communicate with each other only through Foxcote. At the same time, the telegraph control office at Glastonbury had no direct link with Foxcote, and could only contact it via Radstock or Wellow.

This awkward arrangement was in the hands of entirely inexperienced staff. On the night of the crash, none of the signalmen or telegraph clerks involved was more than eighteen years old; even the Superintendent, Caleb Percy, was only 23 years old.

== The crash ==
On 7 August, the August Bank Holiday, the S&D ran seventeen extra trains to cater for people enjoying the day off work. These trains did not appear in the normal timetables and the superintendent at Glastonbury, Caleb Percy, had to arrange crossings i.e. issue instructions as to which trains were to be delayed to allow the special trains to be passed over the single line sections. He was hampered in this task by poor telegraph communications all day.

Both trains involved in the accident were unscheduled. The "down" (south-bound) train was supposedly an empty stock train returning from Bath, but large numbers of passengers were aboard, returning to Radstock and nearby villages from a regatta in Bath. The "up" (north-bound) train was a relief train from Bournemouth, arranged hastily because the scheduled train was overcrowded. Percy and his staff could get very little information on the location of either train. The replies to their enquiries from the telegraph clerk at Wellow (who was only fifteen, and trying to do the work of the stationmaster who had gone for a drink in Midford) were vague. Those from the clerk at Radstock were apparently deliberately obtuse.

The Radstock telegraph clerk sent on the "up" relief train without receiving any crossing order or ascertaining the location of the "down" train. Shortly before midnight, the driver of the "up" train pulled up at the Foxcote signal box. The signalman there, Alfred Dando, was barely literate and not physically strong enough to work his signal levers, so the signal arm was somewhere between "safe" and "caution". The signal lamp was out (as he was not given enough oil to light it), so Dando was waving a hand lantern. After a few minutes, Dando allowed the train to proceed. The clerk at Wellow had already sent the "down" stock train on, but without using his block instruments to alert Dando. The "down" train driver could not see the Foxcote distant signal, as it too was unlit. He saw the home signal against him, and also saw the other train, too late to avoid a collision.

== Aftermath ==
Subsequent enquiries were confused by inadequate or conflicting testimony. Although the clerk at Wellow, Arthur Hillard, might normally have been expected to be blamed, it was felt to be unjust to place the entire responsibility on a fifteen-year-old youth doing the job of several senior staff in an environment of such corporate misconduct. Greater blame was attached to Stationmaster Sleep of Wellow, who had left Hillard alone and gone for a drink in Midford, but it was shared with senior management, including the Superintendent of the Line, Mr. Difford, for specific actions and also "for the general want of uniformity between the regulations and the practice, the laxity of discipline, and the inefficiency and long hours of servants, disclosed during the inquiry." The Board of Trade Inspecting Officer, Captain H.W. Tyler, went so far as to say, having cited seven separate major failings in operational procedures, "Railway traffic worked under such conditions cannot, whatever the system employed, [be] expected to be carried on without serious accidents."

The accident spurred the new management into urgent reforms. The track between Radstock and Wellow was doubled, and the signalling and staff arrangements overhauled. There were to be no further major accidents on the line until it was closed in the 1960s, though there were some notable incidents:

- On 20 November 1929, the driver and fireman of a northbound goods train were overcome by smoke in the Combe Down Tunnel north of Midford. The train was moving very slowly due to a heavy load and having started from a standstill at Midford. The locomotive, S&DJR 7F 2-8-0 No. 89, plodded on and eventually breasted the summit of the gradient. Its downward course to Bath was accomplished more quickly, and the train ran away, crashing into the goods yard on the approach to Bath Green Park railway station, killing the driver, Henry Jennings, and two railway employees in the yard.
- Almost exactly sixty years after the Radstock accident, on 29 July 1936, the crew of an empty colliery wagon train at Foxcote mistakenly abandoned their engine, fearing an imminent collision with another train. The driverless train caused widespread damage at Wellow and Midford stations before becoming derailed only a few miles from Bath, but there were no deaths.

== See also ==
- List of rail accidents in the United Kingdom

== Sources ==
- Rolt, L.T.C. Red for danger. Pan. ISBN 0-330-25555-X.
- Atthill, Robin (December 1962). "The Radstock Accident of 1876". The Railway Magazine. Vol. 108, no. 740. pp. 836–839.
