= Train order operation =

System for safely moving trains

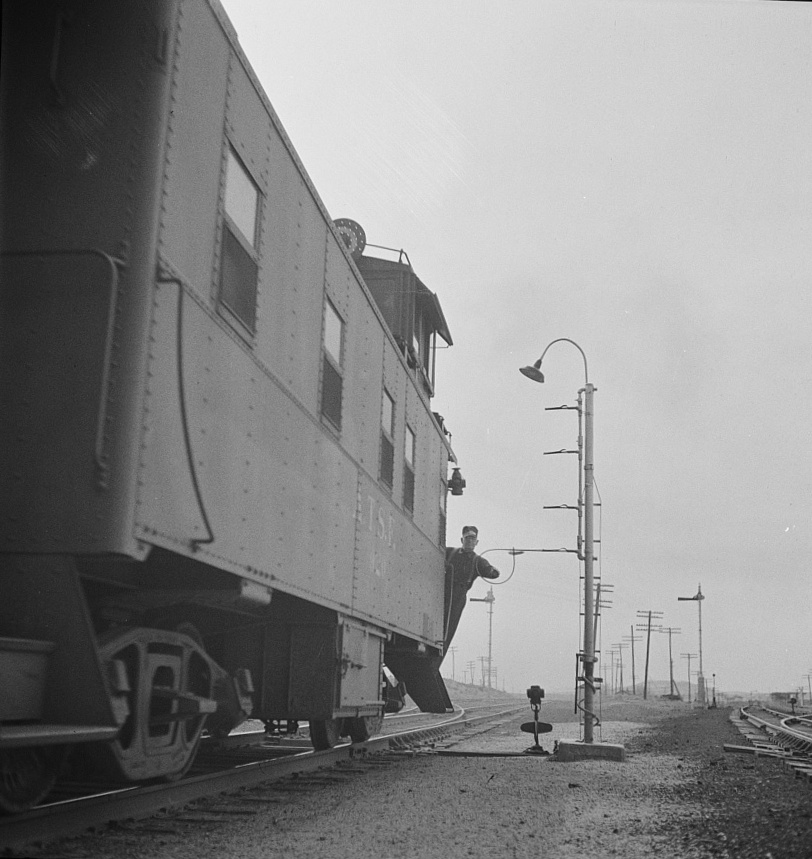
Picking up train orders on the ATSF in Isleta, New Mexico in 1943

Train order operation is a system for safely moving trains using train orders, as opposed to fixed signals or cab signalling. In train order operation, a "train order" is an order issued by or through a proper railway official to govern the movement of trains.

Train order operation was widely used by the railroads of North America before the days of centralized traffic control (CTC), direct traffic control (DTC), and the use of track warrants conveyed by radio. The system used a set of rules when direct communication between train dispatchers and trains was limited or non-existent. Trains would follow a predetermined operating plan, known as the timetable, unless superseded by train orders conveyed to the train from the dispatcher, through local intermediaries. Train order operation was a system that required minimum human overhead in an era before widespread use of technology-based automation. It was the most practical way for railroads with limited capital resources, or lines with limited traffic, to operate. To this day, many short lines, heritage railways, and railroad museums continue to use Train Order operation.

== North American usage ==
Timetable and train order operation was widely used on North American railroads that had a single main track with periodic passing sidings. Timetable and train orders were used to determine which train had the right of way at any point along the line. A train which had the right of way over another train was said to be the superior train. Trains could be superior by right, by class or by direction. While a train dispatcher could establish "right" via train orders, the operating timetable established scheduled trains, their class and the superior direction. The "class" designation of a train equates to its priority, with passenger trains having the highest, freight trains having less and Extra (unscheduled) trains having the lowest. In case of trains of the same class meeting the superior direction would then apply. On single track rail lines, the timetable specifies (explicitly or implicitly) the points at which two trains would meet and pass. It would be the responsibility of the inferior train to clear the main track a safe time before the superior train is scheduled to pass. The timetable thus provides the basic framework for train movement on a particular portion of the railroad. However, variations in traffic levels from day to day, unforeseen delays, the need to perform maintenance, and other contingencies required that railroads find a way to deviate from their established schedules.

Deviations from the timetable operation would be enacted through train orders sent from the train dispatcher to block operators. These orders would override the established timetable priorities and provide trains with explicit instructions on how to run. Train orders consisted of two types, protection and authority. Protective train orders would be used to ensure that no trains would be at risk of colliding with another along the line. Once the protective orders had been delivered to block operators (who might pass them to train crews), an authority could be issued to a train to move over the line where protection had been established. Normally the timetable established both protection and authority for scheduled trains so train orders were only used for extra trains, which were not in the timetable, and scheduled trains moving contrary to their normal authorities.

Timetable and train order operation supplanted earlier forms of timetable only and line-of-sight running. The ability for a single dispatcher to issue train orders was enabled by the invention of the electric telegraph in the 1840s. The earliest recorded usage of the telegraph to convey train orders in the US came in 1851 on the Erie Railroad and by the time of the American Civil War, nearly every railroad had adopted the system. Gradually the telegraph was supplanted by the telephone as the preferred method of communication. By the 1970s, this function was carried out primarily by two-way radio. With the advent of radio communications, timetable and train order operation began to fall out of favor as DTC and CTC became more common on major carriers. CTC enabled dispatchers to set up meets remotely and allowed trains to proceed entirely on signal indication. Where signals were not present, DTC and the related track warrant control allowed dispatchers to directly inform trains what they were to do instead of needing to work through intermediaries or have the train crews figure things out for themselves.

=== Train order ===
The train order provides the means to deal with changes in operating conditions as they arise. Orders modify the established timetable. Among the functions a train order can perform are:

- Creating a train not provided for by the timetable (an "extra")
- Annulling a train provided by the timetable
- Creating sections of a schedule (in essence "cloning" a train's schedule and class when, for example, too much traffic exists to be handled by a single train)
- Setting meeting points between extras since they have no timetable schedule
- Altering timetable meeting points (for example when one train is late and adhering to the timetable meeting point would cause delays for other trains)
- Altering the schedule of a train to allow other trains to run with respect to the altered schedule rather than that given in the timetable
- Giving a train rights over another train that ordinarily has timetable superiority
- Conveying warnings about temporary conditions such as temporary speed limits, track conditions or hazards which might affect the safety of trains or train crews

== Train-order station ==
A train-order station is a control point at which trains can be stopped and controlled through the use of train orders. A station has a distinct name, and may have any of the following:

- A siding or other track by which trains can pass each other
- A communications means for an operator to receive train orders
- A signal to indicate to trains whether there are train orders to be picked up

A train order station need not be at a passenger or freight station, nor does such a station have to handle train orders. In isolated areas, train order stations may be required where there are no towns, to facilitate smooth operation. In denser areas, passenger stations may be spaced more closely than train order stations.

A station may be staffed by an operator who receives train orders and gives them to trains as they pass. Operators also record the passage of trains by their station. Upon receipt of an order, the operator makes copies and sets the signal to indicate to approaching trains that orders are to be picked up. Some train-order signals had three positions:

Proceed (green light or vertical blade)
No orders; train may proceed
Receive orders (yellow light or diagonal blade)
Pick up orders without stopping
Stop (red light or horizontal blade)
Stop to receive orders or to wait for another train to pass

=== Dispatcher and operator procedures ===
Train orders were issued by the dispatcher responsible for the portion of railroad concerned. They were conveyed to operators at outlying stations along the railroad via telegraph or telephone. The receiving operators would copy the order onto onionskin (multiple-copy) forms designed for that purpose, and would repeat the order back to the dispatcher. This permitted the dispatcher and other operators concerned to confirm the accuracy or the order. As each operator correctly repeated the order, the dispatcher would give a complete time, along with the initials of the designated railroad official for that territory. After the order was completed, it was delivered by the operator to the concerned trains as they arrived or passed the delivery point. The operating timetable indicated locations at which train crews could expect to receive train orders. If that same timetable did not require that a train receive a "Clearance Form A" before departing, then a train order signal of some type was provided to advise train crews whether or not train orders were to be delivered. Delivery was accomplished by hand, if the train stopped, or posted trackside to be grabbed by a crew member while the train continued to move past the station. With the latter, the paper order was placed in a train order fork or hoop, either held by the operator as the train passed or mounted at trackside.

The train and engine crews addressed by the order were required to observe the instructions provided in the train order, the details of which were provided by the railroad's operating rule book to be acted upon.

Explanation of sample train order
Train order No. 115	Salem Yd, 11-2-1944	Specifies the order number, location issued (the dispatcher's office at the yard in Salem, Illinois) and date
To: C & E Extra 2005 North		Specifies the train(s) addressed and their location; this copy of the order is addressed to "conductor and engineer of Extra 2005 North at VN Tower". Extra trains are designated by their engine number. All trains affected by any order must receive a copy of the order, which will be addressed at whatever location the order is to be delivered to those trains.
At: VN Tower		Specifies the train(s) addressed and their location; this copy of the order is addressed to "conductor and engineer of Extra 2005 North at VN Tower". Extra trains are designated by their engine number. All trains affected by any order must receive a copy of the order, which will be addressed at whatever location the order is to be delivered to those trains.
No 123 Eng 1001 take siding meet Extra 2005 North at Kell instead of Texico		Modifies the meet location between regular train No 123 and Extra 2005 specified in a previously issued order and specifies which train takes siding at meeting point. The engine number is specified for the scheduled train so that other trains can identify it by sight.
take siding meet No 174 Eng 895 and Extra 1937 North at Benton		Specifies another meet between No 123 and two other trains, one scheduled and one extra. This meet is not relevant to the train crew of Extra 2005 North.
No 122 Eng 222 take siding meet No 123 Eng 1001 at Texico		Specifies another meet between No 123 and another scheduled train. This is a separate statement to emphasise that No 122 will take the siding in this meet. Again, not relevant to the train crew of Extra 2005 North.
Made complete 659 am by RED		Time and call sign (initials) of the dispatcher issuing the order; once "made complete", the order becomes operative and continues so until fulfilled, superseded, or annulled.
Operator Cole		The name of the operator copying and repeating the order at VN Tower.

== See also ==
- Automatic block signaling – Railroad communications system
- Procedural control – A similar system used in early air traffic control, which was adapted from train order techniques
