= Train dispatcher =

Rail transport profession

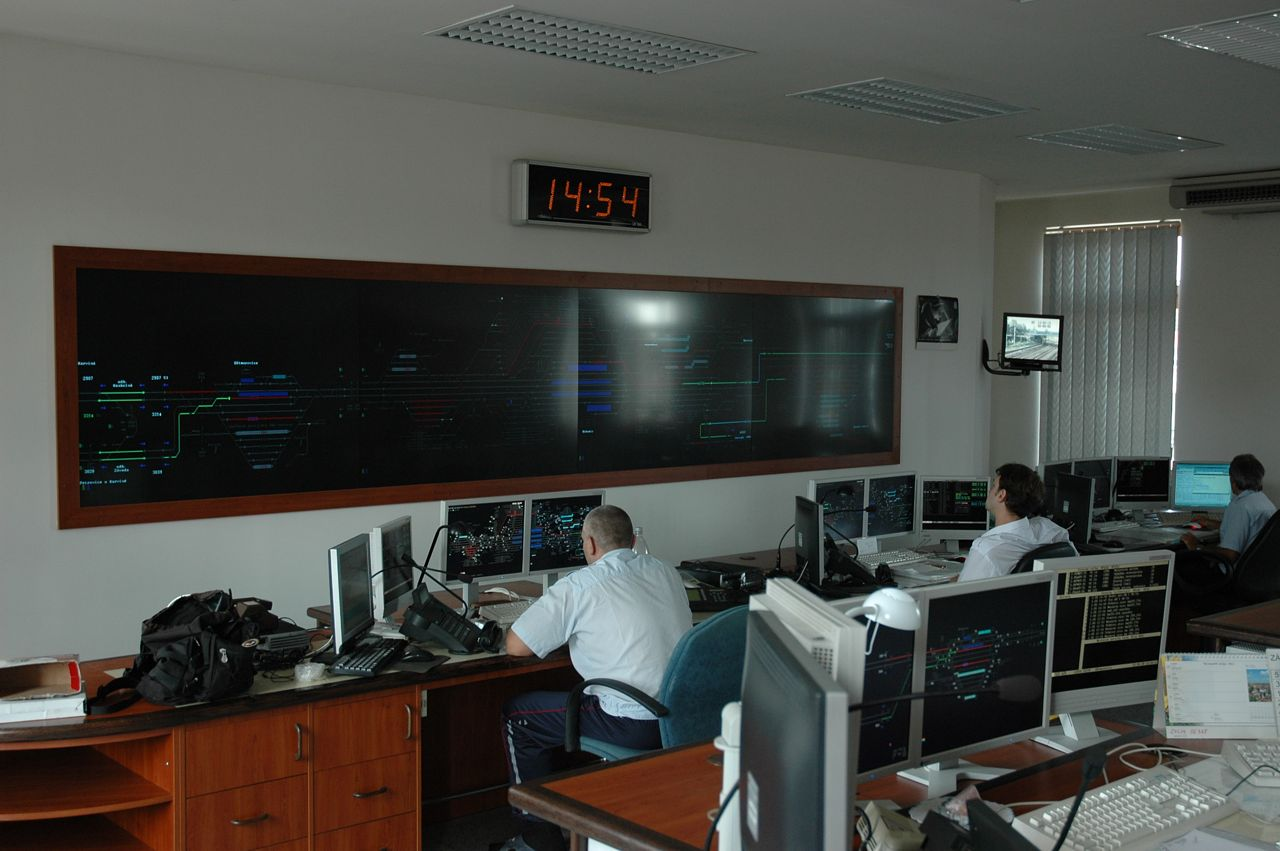
- Local dispatchers at work at the central station in Bohumín, Czech Republic, in August 2008

Occupation
- Synonyms: Rail traffic controller; train controller; train service controller; signaller
- Occupation type: Traffic management occupation
- Activity sectors: Rail transport

Description
- Competencies: Controls railway traffic
- Related jobs: Signalman

A train dispatcher (US), rail traffic controller (Canada), train controller (Australia), train service controller (Singapore) or signaller (UK), is employed by a rail transport company to direct and facilitate the movement of trains over an assigned territory, which is usually part, or all, of a railroad operating division. The dispatcher is also responsible for cost effective movement of trains and other on-track railroad equipment to optimize physical (trains) and human resource (crews) assets.

== History ==
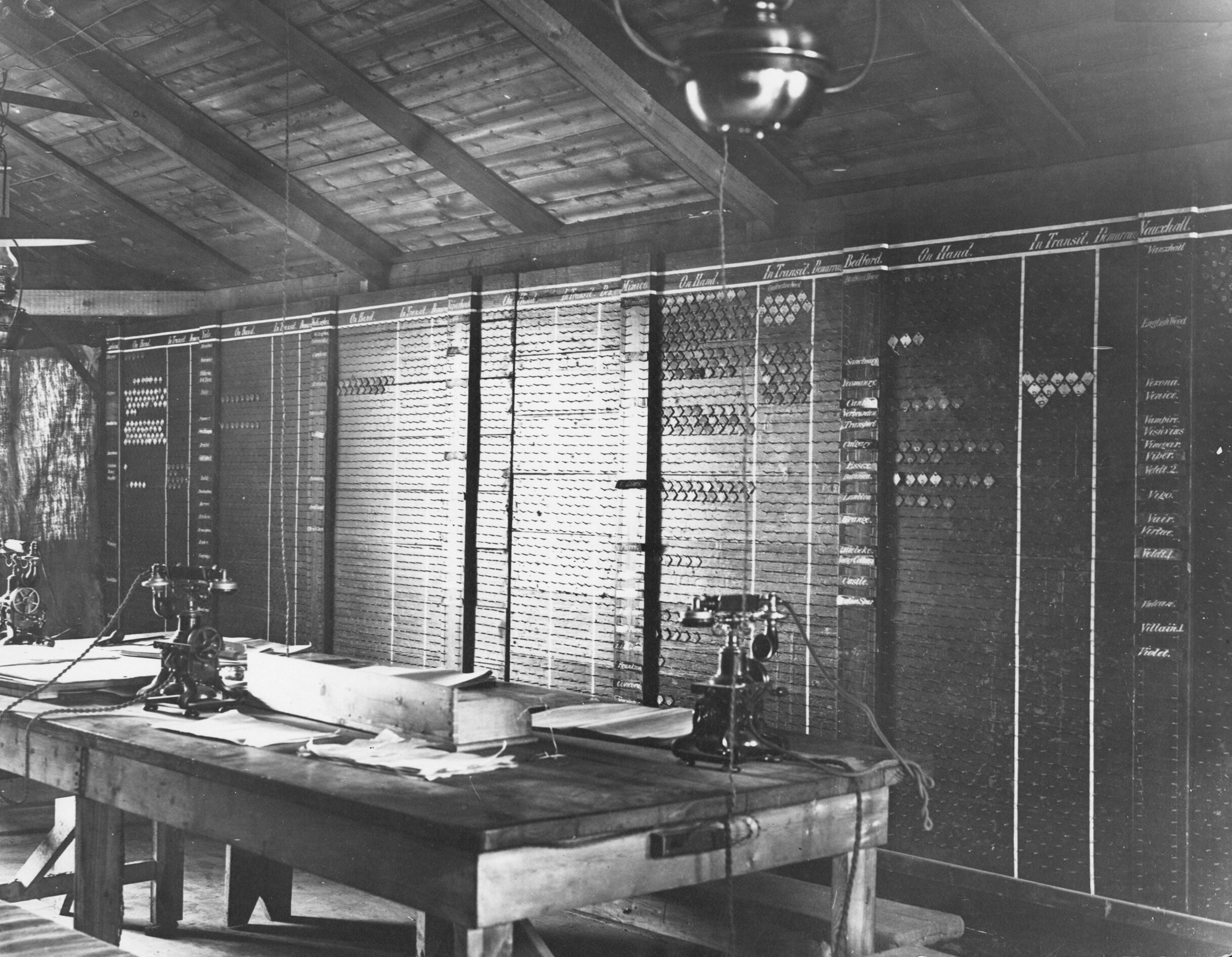
A railway control room in Belgium during World War I. The board shows destinations and tags have been put on it to show which engines and wagons are in transit or available.

Charles Minot, a Division Superintendent on the Erie Railroad is credited with the first effort to control the movement of a train beyond the rule book and operating timetable, when, in September 1851, he sent a telegram to a railroad employee at another location directing that all trains be held at that point until the train Minot was riding could arrive.

From that beginning, a system of train dispatching evolved. The operating rule book, later standardized for all railroads, contained the basic rules for the operation of trains, such as the meaning of the all fixed, audible and hand signals; the form, format and meaning of train orders; and the duties and obligations of each class of employee. The operating, or official, timetable established train numbers and schedules; meeting points for those trains; showed the length of passing tracks at each station as well as indicating the locations where train orders might be issued and contained a variety of other information which might be necessary or useful to train crews operating trains over the territory covered.

Train orders supplemented the timetable and the rule book. They were addressed to a particular train or trains and directed that train or trains to do whatever the train dispatcher had decided needed to be done: meet another train, wait at specified locations, run late on its published schedule, be cautious under the circumstances described or numerous other actions.

Train dispatchers are required to be intimately familiar with the physical characteristics of the railroad territory for which they are responsible, as well as the operating capabilities of the locomotive power being used. Experienced train dispatchers learned the idiosyncrasies of the locomotive engineers and train conductors and melded that knowledge into the operating decisions made. An efficient train dispatcher could utilize the rule book, timetable, train orders and personal experience to move a large number of trains over the assigned territory with minimal delay to any train, even in single-track territory.

Initially, train dispatchers issued train orders using American Morse code over telegraph wires. Later, after the telephone was invented in 1876 and became common, most railroads constructed their own telephone systems, for internal communications, which the train dispatchers used to issue train orders. The last train order known to have been issued using Morse code was copied at Whitehall, Montana, on May 6, 1982, on the Burlington Northern Railroad.

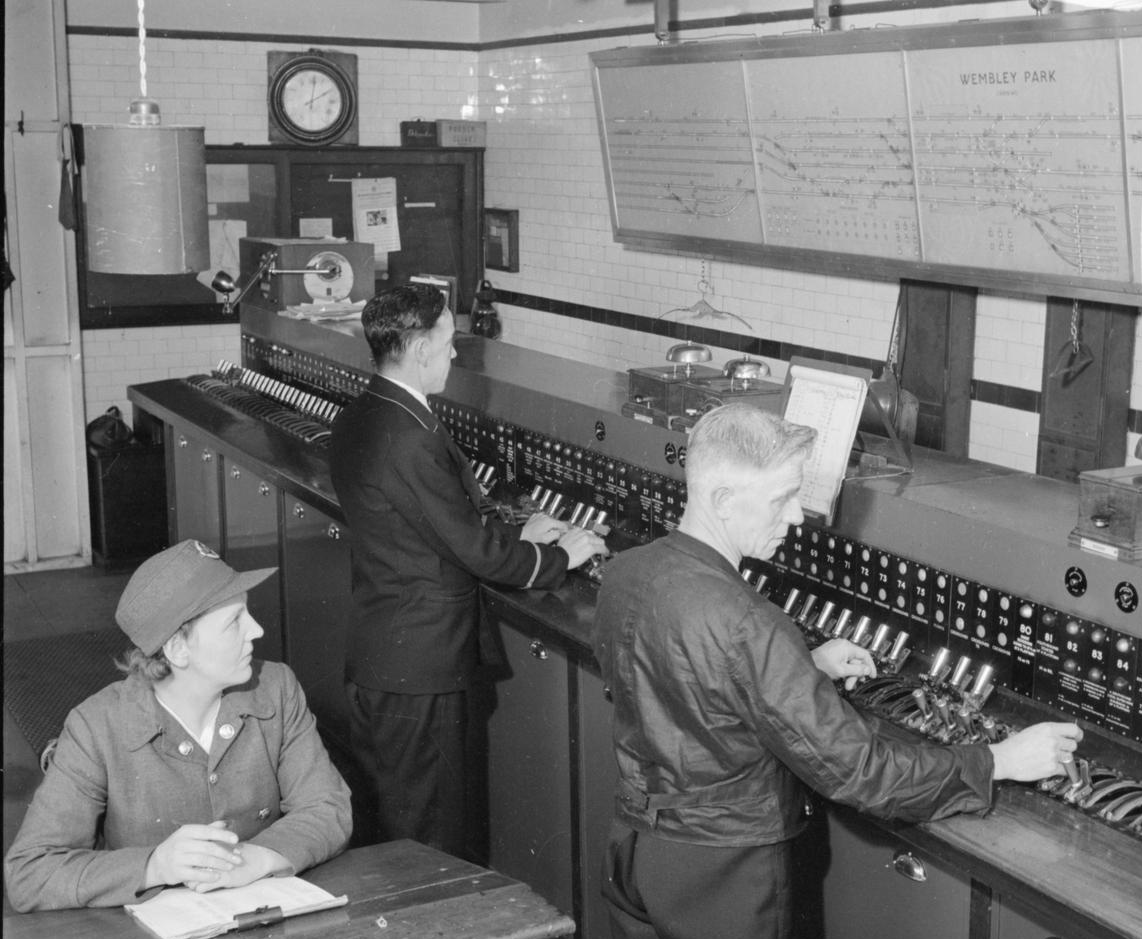
Train dispatchers in a signal box on the London Underground, 1942

Beginning before World War II and accelerating after it, most major railroads installed centralized traffic control (CTC) systems to control train movements. Using CTC, a train dispatcher could align track switches anywhere on the territory so that trains could move into and out of sidings without having to stop and hand throw switches. The train dispatcher could also control the trackside signals governing the movement of trains. Two-way radios enabled train dispatchers to communicate directly with train and engine crews. These capabilities eliminated the need for most train orders, but still required the oversight of a train dispatcher.

== By country ==
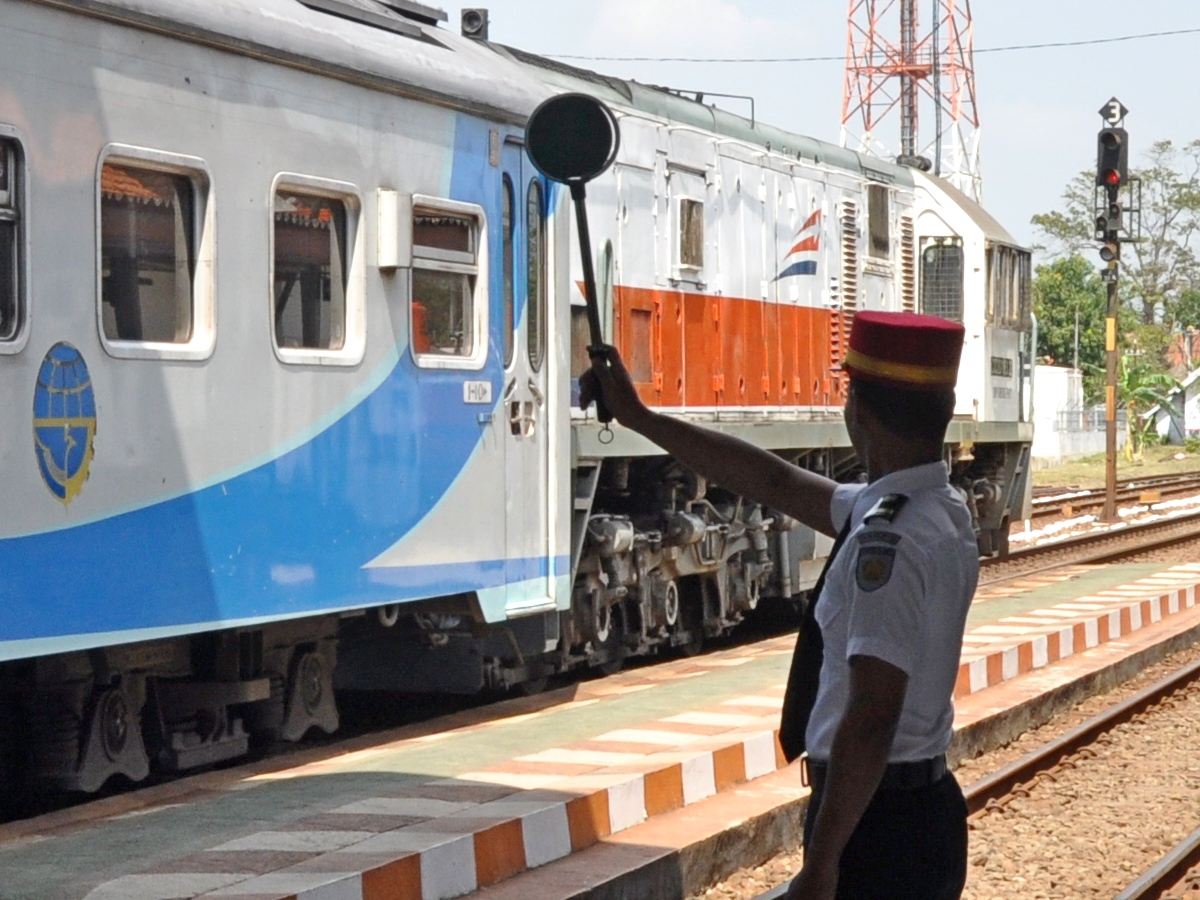
An Indonesian train dispatcher

In Australia train dispatchers are known as Train/Network controllers. Most train controllers are employed by such government organisations as the Australian Rail Track Corporation, the Public Transport Authority of Western Australia, Queensland Rail and Sydney Trains. Others are the employees of privately operated railways such as those found in the Pilbara region. The mining giants BHP, Fortescue, Rio Tinto and Roy Hill, all operate their own networks from Remote Operation Centres and employ large numbers of train controllers.

In Canada a train dispatcher is known as a rail traffic controller (RTC). The two biggest employers of rail traffic controllers are Canadian National and Canadian Pacific.

In New Zealand a dispatcher is known as a train controller, as in Australia. KiwiRail recently centralised all of its train control functions in a single control centre located in the national capital, Wellington, at the southern end of the North Island.

Singapore refers to their train dispatchers as train service controllers (TSC). On its Mass Rapid Transit (MRT), they run the Operations Control Centre (OCC) and ensure that trains run on time and manage any incidents on the system.

== See also ==
- American Train Dispatchers Association
- List of railway industry occupations
- Vince Coleman (train dispatcher)

== Sources ==
- Association of American Railroads Standard Book of Rules, 1926 edition.
- Association of American Railroads Consolidated Code of Operating Rules, 1967 edition.
- Robert Jones. "Milestones in Telegraphic History" (PDF).
