= Clayton Tunnel rail crash =

1861 railway accident near Brighton, England

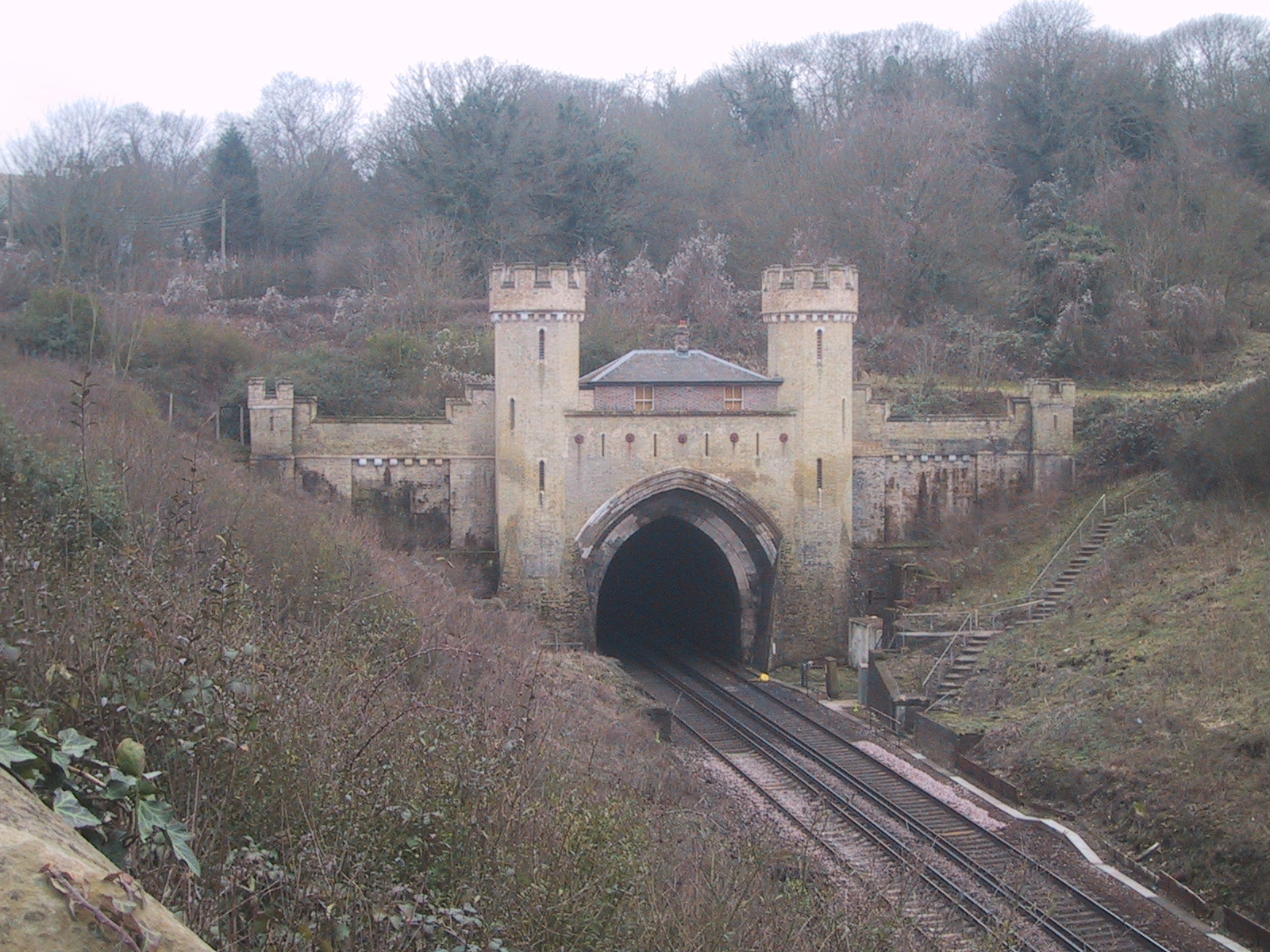
- The tunnel's north entrance

Details
- Date: 25 August 1861; ~08:45
- Location: Clayton, West Sussex
- Coordinates: 50°54′46″N 0°09′14″W
- Country: England
- Line: Brighton Main Line
- Operator: London Brighton and South Coast Railway
- Cause: Signaller's error

Statistics
- Trains: 2
- Passengers: 589
- Deaths: 23
- Injured: 176

The Clayton Tunnel rail crash occurred on Sunday 25 August 1861, five miles (8 km) from Brighton on the south coast of England. At the time it was the worst accident on the British railway system. A train ran into the back of another inside the tunnel, killing 23 and injuring 176 passengers.

Three north-bound trains left Brighton station within a few minutes of one another. At the southern entrance to Clayton Tunnel an automatic signal failed to return to danger after the first train passed, allowing the second train to follow it into the tunnel. The signaller at the south end of the tunnel belatedly waved a red flag in an attempt to stop the second train, but thought that it had not been seen. However the driver of the second train had briefly glimpsed the flag and stopped his train inside the tunnel. The signaller then misinterpreted a 'line clear' telegraph message from the signal box at the north end of the tunnel as referring to the second train instead of the first, and signalled the third train into the tunnel.

== Circumstances ==
In his cabin close to the southern entrance of the tunnel, signalman Henry Killick was in charge of a signal linked to an alarm bell, and a needle telegraph. He controlled the signal using a wheel in the cabin, and the signal would normally be at "danger" unless he set it to "clear" to allow a train to enter the tunnel. When a train had passed it, the signal was designed to return automatically to "danger", but if it did not, the alarm bell would ring. The needle telegraph was linked to a signal box at the northern entrance of the tunnel. When the signalman in the southern box pressed and held down a switch, it gave a "train in tunnel" indication to the signalman in the northern box. Otherwise, the needle on the telegraph would hang vertically.

Except for the Clayton Tunnel, the line was worked on the time-interval system, which required trains on the same track to be separated by five minutes. Despite that, the three trains left Brighton within the space of seven minutes:

- Portsmouth Excursion left at 8.28 am
- Brighton Excursion left at 8.31 am
- Brighton to Victoria left at 8.35 am

At the southern entrance of the Clayton Tunnel, the first train passed the signal at "clear", but the alarm bell rang to warn Killick that the signal had not returned to "danger". He sent a "train in tunnel" message to Brown in the north cabin, but did not return his signal to "danger" in time to stop the second train from passing it and entering the tunnel. It was only three minutes behind the first, so it was possible that it would catch up with the train ahead. Because the first train was still in the tunnel, Killick rushed out of the cabin, waving his red flag to stop the second train just as it was passing. However, he could not be sure that the driver had seen his flag. He telegraphed Brown at the northern mouth of the tunnel: "Is tunnel clear?"

At that moment, the first train left the tunnel, so Brown signalled back to Killick: "Tunnel clear". Tragically, Killick thought that Brown was referring to the second train and not the first. In fact, the driver of the second train had seen the red flag. He stopped his train about half a mile (800 m) into the tunnel and began reversing back to the south end.

Meanwhile, Killick saw the third train approaching, which stopped at his signal. Thinking that the tunnel was clear, he waved his white flag to allow it to proceed. The second and third trains collided in the tunnel with great force. The second train was pushed forward, and the locomotive of the third train destroyed the guard's van of the second train before smashing into its last carriage. The locomotive of the third train rode up over the carriage roof and smashed its chimney against the tunnel roof before stopping. Many of the 23 deaths were in that last carriage, in which passengers were burnt or scalded to death by the shattered engine. The bodies of a number of the victims were stored temporarily in the cellar of The Hassocks Hotel.

A nine-day inquest into the deaths of the 23 victims was held at Brighton town hall. It concluded with the jury finding that Charles Legg, the assistant stationmaster of Brighton station, was guilty of manslaughter, because of his negligence in starting three trains so close together, against the rules of the company. The jury did not find any negligence by either signalman Killick or by Brown. Legg was committed to trial for manslaughter, but found not guilty.

== Causes ==
The catastrophe publicised the problem of trains travelling too close together, with signalmen having to appraise the situation too quickly for safety's sake. A simple communication mistake between the two signal boxes caused havoc that Sunday, but the telegraph was also blamed for the tragedy because it did not register without continual pressure on the switch. The signal, too, was also at fault for not returning to "danger" immediately after the train had passed. The accident encouraged the use of the block system (rather than the time interval system) for the remainder of the railway system.

One other aspect of this accident was that Signalman Killick was working a continuous 24-hour shift that day, rather than the regulation 18 hours to gain a complete day off duty. In his report on the accident Captain Tyler stated that "it was disgraceful that a man in so responsible a position as Signalman Killick should be compelled to work for twenty-four hours at a stretch in order to earn one day of rest a week."

Charles Dickens may have partly based his story "The Signal-Man" on this accident, dramatising the events (especially the bells and the telegraph needle), as well as adding other incidents. His own experience at the Staplehurst rail crash may have inspired him to write this ghost story. Readers of the story in December 1866 would likely have still remembered the Clayton accident.

== Similar accidents ==
Other accidents in which the signalman forgot, or got confused about, the presence of a train include:

- Welwyn Tunnel rail crash – 1866
- Thirsk rail crash – 1892
- Hawes Junction train disaster – signalman forgets about light engines on line – 1910
- Quintinshill rail crash – signalman forgets about train on line – 1915
- Winwick rail crash – 1934
- Welwyn Garden City rail crash (1935) – signalman confuses train numbers 825 and 825A, and clears signals in error – 1935
