= 1890 Norton Fitzwarren rail crash =

Railway incident in Somerset, England

Coordinates: 51°01′N 3°08′W

Norton Fitzwarren rail crash
- Accident site

Details
- Date: 11 November 1890; 01:24
- Location: Norton Fitzwarren station
- Country: England
- Line: Reading to Plymouth Line
- Cause: Signalling error

Statistics
- Trains: 2
- Passengers: ~50
- Deaths: 10
- Injured: 11

The Norton Fitzwarren rail crash occurred on 11 November 1890, at Norton Fitzwarren station on the Great Western Railway, approximately two miles south-west of Taunton in Somerset. A special boat train carrying passengers from Plymouth to Paddington collided with a goods train that was being shunted on the main line. Ten passengers were killed, and eleven people (including the driver and fireman of the special train) were seriously injured. Another significant accident occurred at Norton Fitzwarren in 1940.

== Sequence of events ==
The incident began at 12:36 am, when a down goods train from Bristol to Exeter, hauled by both a standard-gauge engine and a broad gauge pilot engine, arrived at Norton Fitzwarren to take on and put off stock. Another down goods train, which was not scheduled to stop at the station, was due at 1:17 am, and at 1:05 am the guard of the first goods train was told by the signalman to shunt his train clear of the down line, on to the up main, while the pilot engine was separately moved on to a branch line.

After the fast goods train had passed, the signalman moved the pilot engine back to the down main line – while this movement was taking place, at 1:23 am, the up boat train was offered to the signalman by the preceding signal box. Forgetting that the slow goods train was still on the up main line, the signalman accepted the boat train, and cleared his signals for it. At 1:24 am, with full steam on at a speed estimated at 50 miles per hour (80 km/h), the boat train passed the signal box and ran into the goods train. The driver and fireman of the goods train managed to jump clear before the accident, but were unable to give any signal in the short time they had. The guard of the boat train did not recall any braking before the impact.

The engine of the boat train, 4-4-0ST No. 2051, was withdrawn following the collision.

== Causes ==
The immediate cause of the accident was that the signalman had forgotten that the goods train was still on the main line after being shunted and allowed the boat train into his section with the line obstructed. The inspector, Colonel Rich, recommended that signalmen should be provided with a device that they could place on a lever if a line was obstructed, which was already being done on some other railways or unofficially by some signalmen. This idea was widely adopted over following years by the provision of lever collars.

The Board of Trade enquiry ruled that a contributory factor was the premature change of the goods train's headlamp from red to green; it was possible that the driver of the boat train would have noticed a red lamp ahead of him in time to apply his brakes. Another contributory factor was the failure of the guard of the goods train to notify the signalman of the presence of his train on the main line, as required by the rules of the company. In later years this generally became a requirement for the driver and fireman instead (Rule 55).

A further contributory factor was that the goods train had been shunted on to the main line through lack of a suitable siding. Following the inquest, twelve refuge sidings were built between Exeter and Weston.

== See also ==
- Norton Fitzwarren rail crash (1940)

== Similar accidents ==
- Thirsk rail crash (1892)
- Hawes Junction rail crash (1910)
- Quintinshill rail crash (1915)
- Winwick rail crash (1934)
