= Norton Fitzwarren rail crash =

There have been two major accidents at Norton Fitzwarren in Somerset:

- The 1890 Norton Fitzwarren rail crash
- The 1940 Norton Fitzwarren rail crash
