= 1892 Thirsk rail crash =

Train crash on the North Eastern Railway on 2 November 1892

Coordinates: 54.267°N 1.407°W

Thirsk rail crash (1892)
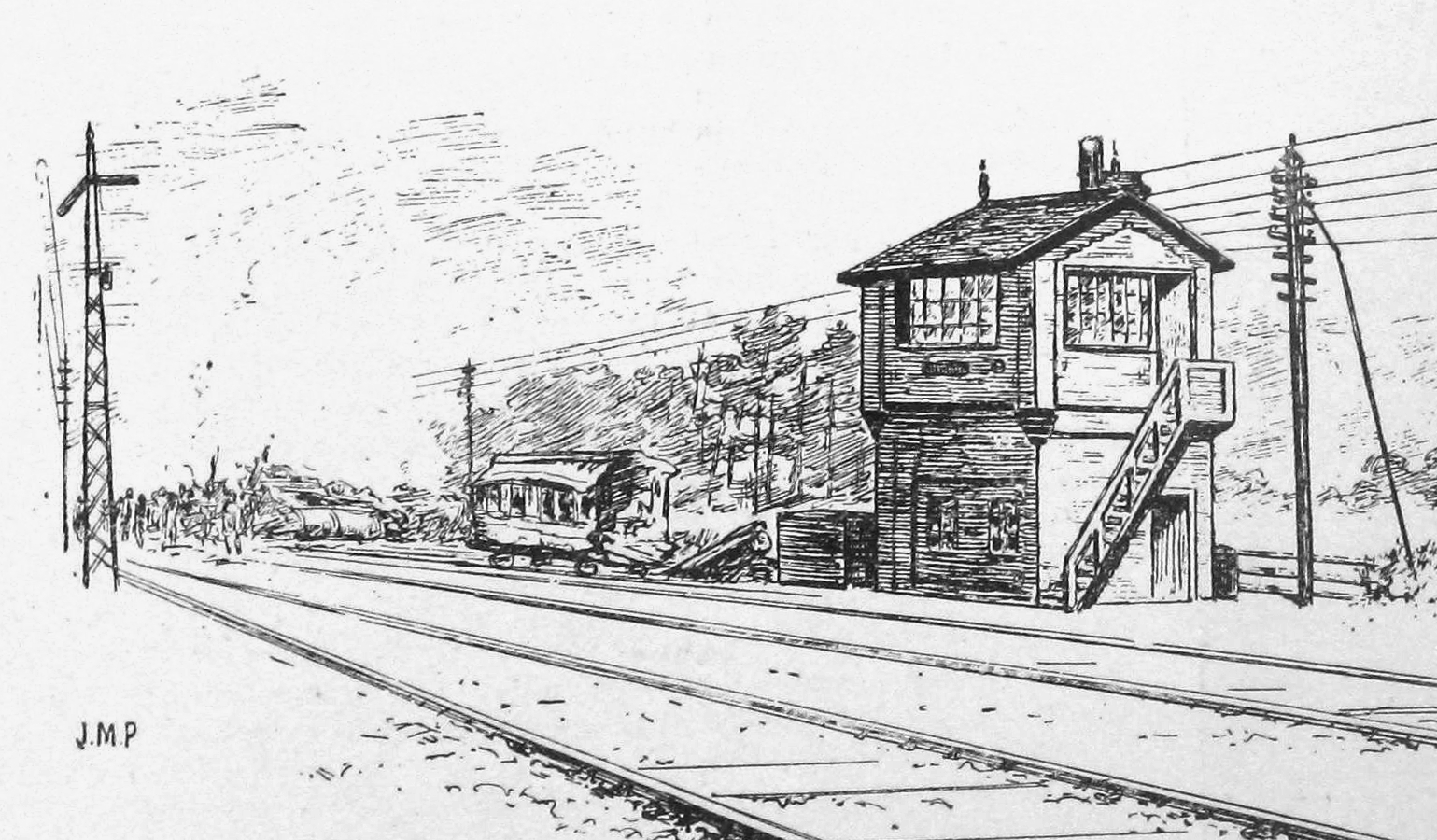
- Manor House Signal Cabin at the time of the 1892 collision

Details
- Date: 2 November 1892; 04:02
- Location: Thirsk, Yorkshire
- Country: England
- Line: East Coast Main Line
- Cause: Signalling error (due to ill-health)

Statistics
- Trains: 2
- Deaths: 10
- Injured: 43

The 1892 Thirsk rail crash happened at Manor House signal box on 2 November 1892, on the North Eastern Railway about 3 miles (4.8 km) north of Thirsk railway station in the North Riding of Yorkshire, England.

== Events ==
James Holmes was the signalman at Manor House signal box. The day before the crash, his infant daughter Rose was taken ill and later died; Holmes was extremely distressed, having remained awake through the night ministering to the child, walking miles to try to find the local doctor (who was away from home attending to another patient) and later comforting his distraught wife. He reported to the stationmaster at Otterington, Thomas Kirby, that he would be unable to work the shift on the next night, but Kirby merely asked his superiors for a relief signalman, without stating that the reason was Holmes had reported himself unfit to work. The Assistant District Signals Inspector at York, already harassed by other emergencies, replied that there was no relief signalman available, and his superior later concurred.

Forced to complete his shift, Holmes called at the Otterington signal box before walking to Manor House and asked the signalman there, Henry Eden, to notify him when the passenger train from York arrived at 8:58 pm; Holmes was expecting his mother to arrive by that service, having telegraphed asking for her to come and tend to his wife as he worked. He had expected his mother to arrive on either the 6:00 pm train or the 7:37 pm train, and had walked to the station on both occasions hoping to meet her, which added to his fatigue; by this point, Holmes had been awake for more than 36 hours, and confided in Eden that he was already exhausted.

It was night with a thick mist which later thickened to fog. About three hours into Holmes' shift, by which time he had received a telegraph stating that his mother had arrived on the 8:58 pm train and gone straight to his house, two express passenger trains were due from the north. These constituted the up (London-bound) nightly Scotch Express, which was divided into two separate trains. The first had left Edinburgh on time at 10:30 pm, but the second had been delayed by the late arrival of connecting trains and did not leave until 11:02 pm. The first portion of the express passed Manor House signalbox at 3:38 am; after it had passed Northallerton North, the signalman there allowed a goods train from Middlesbrough to Starbeck up the main line after it. Holmes let the goods train into his section but then was "overmastered by sleep", having now been awake for more than 46 hours. The goods train came to a halt just outside his signal box. Thirteen minutes later, Holmes awoke, rather confused. Henry Eden at the Otterington signal box warned him to be ready for the second part of the express, and Holmes saw that his instruments still indicated that there was a train on the line. He had forgotten about the goods train, and thought he had fallen asleep before clearing the instruments after the first express. He cleared the instruments and accepted the second express. He then had second thoughts and telegraphed the Otterington signal box (using the "speaking instrument", an old term for the single needle telegraph, not to be confused with a telephone), but too late for Eden to halt the express.

The express crashed at 60 miles per hour (97 km/h) into the goods train, which had only just started to move off at walking pace. Nine passengers and the guard of the goods train were killed. 39 other passengers and 4 train crew were injured. Nearly an hour later, hot coals from the firebox of the engine of the express train set the wreckage on fire. The express train's Pintsch oil gas lighting system acted as an accelerant and added to the fire.

== Aftermath ==
Holmes was charged with manslaughter and found guilty, but was given an absolute discharge upon the strong recommendation of the jury, who were sympathetic to Holmes' personal tragedy; public opinion was also in Holmes' favour.

The railway company was strongly criticised for its cavalier treatment of Holmes, and there had been contributory negligence: by Eden, who knew of Holmes' condition and took no action when there was silence from his signal box for nearly a quarter of an hour, and by the crew of the goods train who remained halted outside Holmes' signal box for several minutes without sending a crewman to the signal box in accordance with Rule 55 to ensure that their train was properly protected by the signals and block instruments.

== Victims ==
Newspapers published a list of the dead once the number of casualties was confirmed:

- James Anderson, an insurance salesman who was carrying insurances worth £2,750
- H. P. Brodie, of Leytonstone
- R. M. Boyle, a commercial traveller for a music publisher
- Charlotte Hamilton, a 5-year-old girl on the way to Australia with her aunt and uncle
- J. Boswell Hill, of Edinburgh
- John H. Lee, a potato merchant of Spitalfields Market
- Captain Duncan A. MacLeod, of the 42nd Highlanders, en route to Gibraltar
- Ann McCullough, Hamilton's aunt
- Mrs McKenzie, of Edinburgh
- George Petch, the goods train guard

Among the survivors were Ronald Ewart, the driver of the express, who broke his thigh; David McCullough, Charlotte Hamilton's uncle; the Marquess of Huntly (who was "severely bruised"); and the Marquess of Tweeddale.

Two of the victims' bodies were incinerated in the resulting fire and were not recovered; survivor Alexander McKenzie stated in newspaper interviews that he had found his wife's body among the wreckage but was unable to save it before the fire broke out. Men employed to clear the crash site and repair the permanent way reported finding calcined bones and lumps of flesh. Some of the human remains had coins fused to them from the intense heat of the fire. The bodies that could be recovered were moved to Thirsk station and an inquest was opened immediately so that the bodies could be released to the families.

== Prevention ==
The accident would have been prevented if the line had been fitted with track circuits which would have prevented the block instruments and the signals from being cleared. However, at the time track circuits were relatively new. Although Manor House was a heavily used part of what was to become known as the East Coast Main Line, the need for such aids to safety there would have been regarded as low; there were no junctions, sidings or crossovers to confuse movement, and the block was one of the shortest and straightest in the country.

Board of Trade Inspecting Officer Francis Marindin also noted that the many casualties were as a result of the lighter carriages being marshalled between the engine and the heavier Pullman coach behind them. When the crash occurred, the Pullman carriage tore into the lighter carriages at the front of the train.

== Similar accidents ==
- Clayton Tunnel rail crash – signalman gets confused about which train is which – 1861
- Hawes Junction train disaster – signalman forgets about light engines on line – 1910
- Quintinshill rail crash – signalman forgets about train on line – 1915
- Winwick rail crash – signalman and booking boy forget about train on main line – 1934

== See also ==
- List of British rail accidents

== Sources ==
- Gray, Adrian (2013). East Coast Main Line disasters. York: Pendragon. ISBN 9781899816194.
- Rolt, L. T. C. (1978). Red for danger. Pan. ISBN 0-330-25555-X.
- Marindin, F. A. (9 December 1892). Accident Returns: Extract for Accident at Manor House, Thirsk on 2nd November 1892 (Report) – via The Railways Archive.
