= Schaltbau Group =

German door manufacturer

- Type: Aktiengesellschaft
- Founded: 1929
- Headquarters: Munich, Germany
- Key people: Albrecht Köhler (chairman executive board); Hans Fechner (chairman supervisory board)
- Revenue: 212.7 million euro (2006); 269.8 Million Euro(2009)
- Number of employees: 1,456 (2006); 1,603 (2009)
- Website: www.schaltbau.de

The Schaltbau Group is a group of mechanical and electrical engineering companies specialising in transportation related products, including automatic door systems for moving vehicles, level crossing equipment, electric connectors and switchgear and safety and warning equipment.

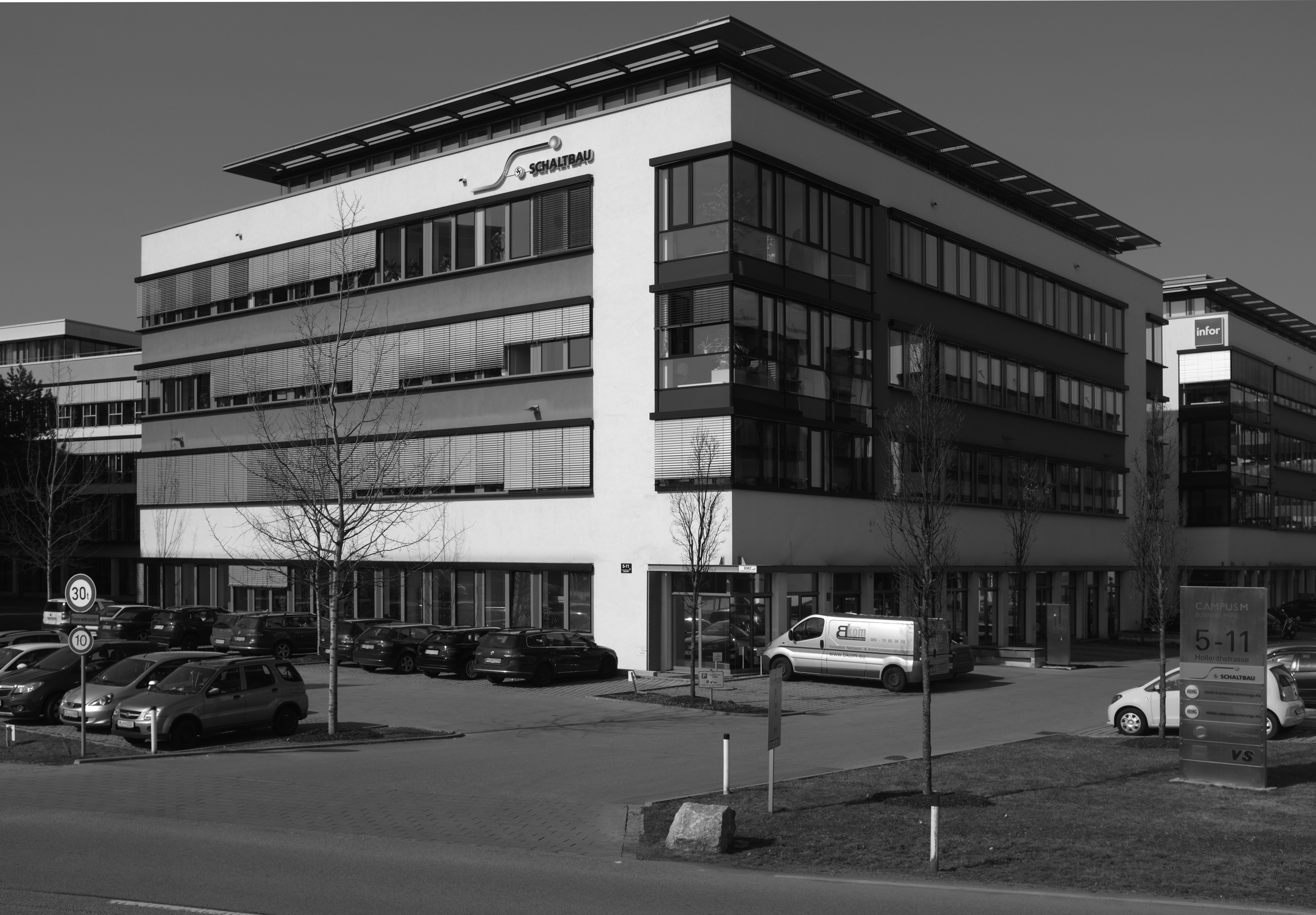
Schaltbau Holding Headquarters in Munich

== History ==
In 1929 Schaltbau GmbH Munich was founded as a company producing switchgear and heating for railway applications, it was taken over by Gutehoffnungshütte (now known as MAN SE) in 1936. In 1972 a new factory was opened in Aldersbach, and in 1976 in acquired another plant in Velden (Vils) in Bavaria. Techniques d'Automatisme (France) was acquired in 1979, and Pintsch Bamag, a manufacturer of level crossing systems was acquired in 1987.

In 1991 the company became a joint stock company and was floated on the stock exchange, and was acquired by Berliner Elektro Holding AG in the same year. The company then started a joint venture with an engineering company in China in 1994, and in 1995 it acquired Gebr. Bode, a prominent door manufacturer for transportation devices. Furthermore, the company acquired Kiepe Elektrik GmbH in 1996, which was subsequently sold to Vossloh AG in 2002.

In 2000, the company transitioned to become Schaltbau Holding AG, spinning off Schaltbau GmbH. at the same time. Schaltbau Group then took over Bubenzer Group, a container crane brake manufacturer, in 2007. More recently, the Schaltbau Group acquired a 65% controlling stake of SPII SpA in 2015, an Italian firm that specializes in crafting and designing human-machine interface machinery, y, before finally acquiring 100% of SPII SpA in 2022.

== Company structure and products ==
The group operates in three business areas 'Mobile transportation technology' via the Bode group (mainly door apparatus for vehicles), 'Stationary transportation technology' via the Pintsch group (railways) and Pintsch Bubenzer group (braking systems), and 'Electromechanical components' via Schaltbau GmbH (electrical connectors, switches and controls).

=== Bode group ===
The Bode group comprises Gebr. Bode GmbH & Co KG which manufactures automatic doors for buses, other road vehicles and trains, BODO Bode - Dogrusan (Turkey) : automatic doors for coaches, Bode North America Inc. : plug, folding and sliding doors for buses and RAWAG Sp. (Poland) : transportation vehicle fittings.

=== Pintsch group ===
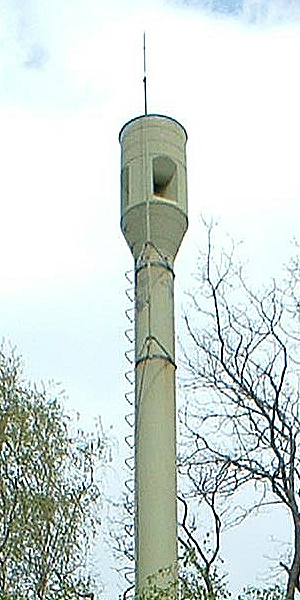
Pintsch BAMAG siren

The Pintsch group primarily produces safety devices for the railway and other transportation industries. Pintsch Bamag GmbH. manufactures level crossing systems, electrical supply components, vehicle lighting, warning and navigation lights and beacons, and sirens and pa systems. Pintsch Bubenzer GmbH. produces industrial braking systems for cranes, shipping and other industries and other related safety devices., Pintsch Aben B.V. (Netherlands) produces railway point heating systems as well as marine lighting lanterns and beacons. The Pintsch group was founded as an independent company, Julius Pintsch A.G., by Julius Pintsch.

=== Schaltbau group ===
Schaltbau GmbH. (Germany) and related companies in France, USA, UK and China produce electrical connectors, switches (up to 3000V), fuse blocks and on board safety equipment for trains (Sifa), and warning equipment (sirens) for the rail industry.
