= Rule 55 =

British railway operating rule

Rule 55 was an operating rule which applied on British railways in the 19th and 20th centuries. It was superseded by the modular rulebook following re-privatisation of the railways. It survives, very differently named: the driver of a train waiting at a signal on a running line must remind the signaller of its presence.

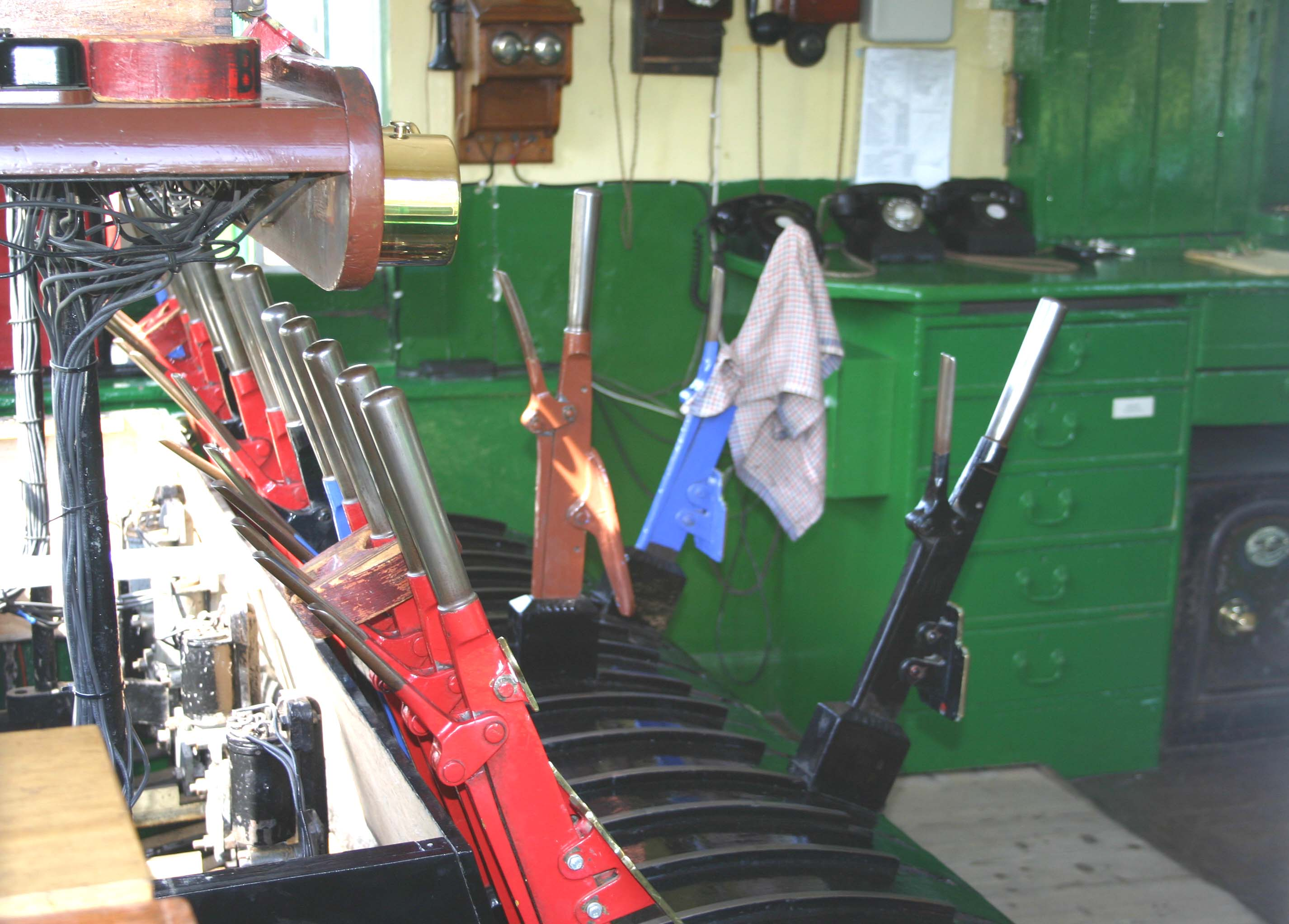
Inside a signal box on the Isle of Wight Steam Railway. The wooden collar on the third lever is in place to denote a train standing on the running line.

Rule 55 was introduced following a spate of accidents caused by signalmen forgetting that trains were standing on a running line, sometimes within sight of their signal boxes.

It required that, if a train was brought to a stand at a signal, within three minutes in clear weather or immediately in rain, snow, or fog, the driver of the train must despatch his fireman, guard, or any shunter riding on the train, to the signal box to ensure that the signalman was aware of the presence of the train, and that all safeguards to protect it, such as slides or collars on the signal levers, were in place, the crewman then signing the train register to confirm this.

In practice, this meant a cautious trudge, in whatever weather, for the crewman. Occasionally the rule was obeyed to the following extent: the crewman merely exchanged a greeting with the signalman, signed the register and returned to the train. In many cases, such as at major junctions or marshalling yards where crewmen crossing the rails were in grave danger from moving trains, the rule could not be applied properly (see exemption white diamond pictured). Further, the need for the fireman to return to the train would delay it if the signal was cleared in the meantime.

== Accidents ==
Failure to apply the rule properly was a factor in several railway accidents in the period from 1890 onwards. At Thirsk and Hawes Junction, the crews of the standing trains failed to carry out the rule. At Quintinshill, the fireman of the standing train signed the register but did not ensure that the signalman had put the necessary safeguards in place.

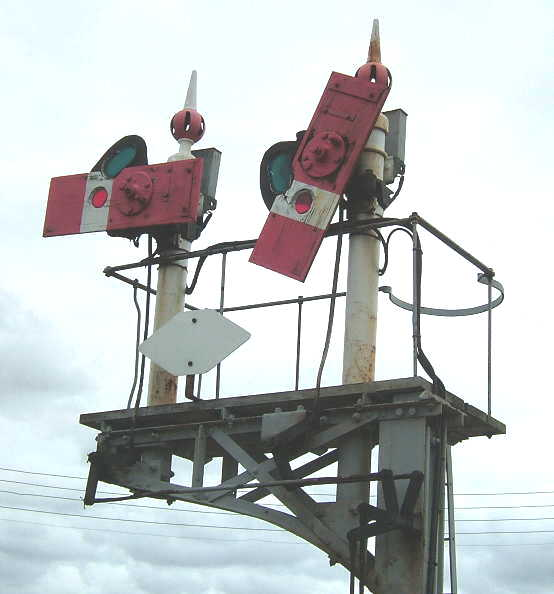
A semaphore signal fitted with a diamond sign indicating there is no need to contact the signaller

It is impossible to know precisely how many accidents were prevented by the proper observation of the rule, and it could not always prevent a crash. At Winwick, a train was brought to a stand some distance from the signal box. The fireman left promptly to carry out the rule, but he had not reached the signal box before his train was struck. To prevent such occurrences, 'call plungers' (which operate an indicator in the signal box when pressed) or telephones were installed at some signal posts, or track circuits installed. However, even this solution was not completely foolproof e.g. at Castlecary in 1937, the signalman observed that a train had passed a signal at danger, possibly due to a false signal indication, and assumed it had continued on past his signal box. The signalman failed to check his track circuit indicators, which would have shown that the train stopped, and the fireman arrived in the signal box moments too late to stop the signalman accepting a following express train. Full interlocking with track circuits and signal indications might have prevented this accident.

== Exemption ==
A white diamond sign on a signal post means that the driver is not required to contact the signaller because a telephone is not provided, but the presence of the train or shunting movement is indicated to the signaller by detection.

== Modernised rule ==
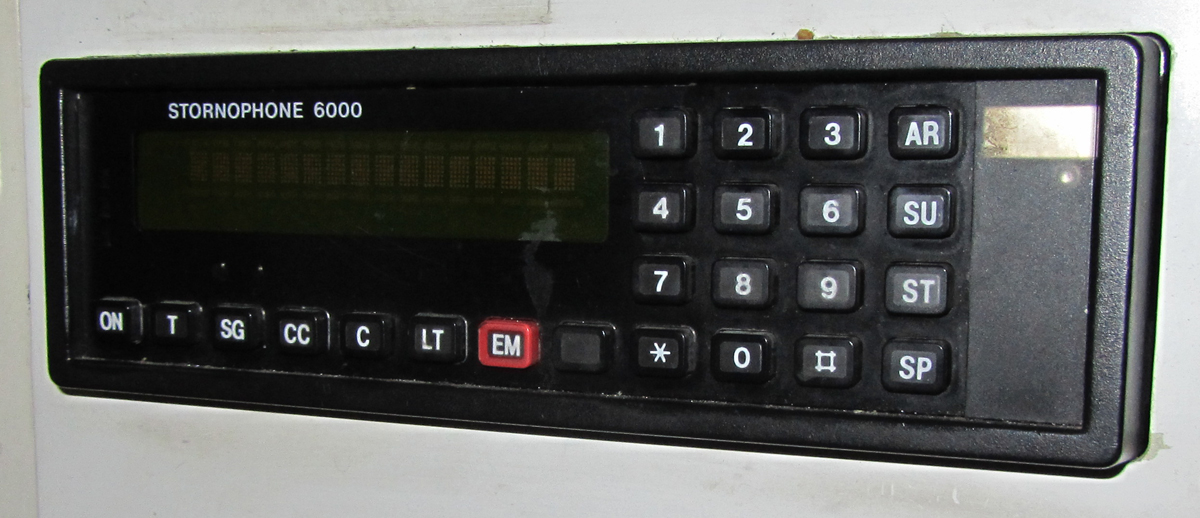
Pressing the SG button on a driver's cab radio will send a "Train standing at signal" message.

The principle of Rule 55 continues – though from 2003 (and as of 2019) the rule is identified rather differently. Rule Book (GE/RT8000) Module S4 Trains or shunting movements detained on running lines, Section 1 (Contacting the signaller - standard arrangements), revised 2015, states (1.1 When to contact the signaller):

Driver - When your train is detained on a running line at a signal at danger, or without a movement authority (MA), you must contact the signaller as soon as possible.

However, you may wait for up to two minutes before contacting the signaller if you can see an obvious reason for the signal being at danger, or not having an MA[,] such as:

• the section ahead being occupied by a train

• a conflicting movement being made.

If the signaller has told you to wait for the signal to clear, or for an MA, you must contact the signaller again every five minutes unless the signaller has given you other instructions.

— Contacting the signaller - standard arrangements,

Modern technology such as signal post telephones, in-cab radio, and mobile phones means that it is rarely necessary for train crew to visit the signal box. In fact, the driver does not even need to speak to the signaller as pressing the "SG" button on CSR and GSM-R radios will send a "Train standing at signal" text message.
