= Quintinshill rail disaster =

1915 railway accident in Scotland

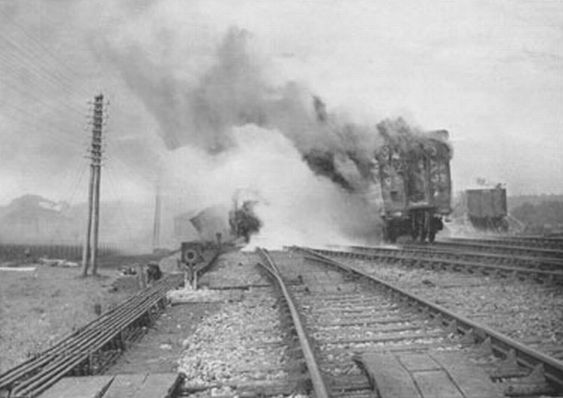
- A burning carriage in the aftermath of the collisions

Details
- Date: 22 May 1915; 111 years ago 6:49 am
- Location: Quintinshill, Dumfriesshire, Scotland
- Coordinates: 55.0146°N 3.0649°W
- Country: Scotland
- Line: Caledonian Main Line part of the West Coast Main Line
- Operator: Caledonian Railway
- Incident type: Double collision, fire
- Cause: Signalling error

Statistics
- Trains: 5
- Deaths: ~226
- Injured: 246

A multi-train rail crash occurred on 22 May 1915 outside the Quintinshill signal box near Gretna Green in Dumfriesshire, Scotland. It resulted in the deaths of over 200 people and remains the worst rail disaster in British history.

The Quintinshill signal box controlled two passing loops, one on each side of the double-track Caledonian Main Line linking Glasgow and Carlisle (part of the West Coast Main Line). At the time of the accident, both passing loops were occupied with goods trains, and a northbound local passenger train was standing on the southbound main line.

The first collision occurred when a southbound troop train travelling from Larbert to Liverpool collided with the stationary local train. A minute later the wreckage was struck by a northbound sleeping car express train travelling from London Euston to Glasgow Central. Gas from the Pintsch gas lighting system of the old wooden carriages of the troop train ignited, starting a fire which soon engulfed all five trains.

Only half the soldiers on the troop train survived. Those killed were mainly Territorial soldiers from the 1/7th (Leith) Battalion, the Royal Scots heading for Gallipoli. The precise death toll was never established with confidence as some bodies were never recovered, having been wholly consumed by the fire, and the roll list of the regiment was also destroyed in the fire. The official death toll was 227 (215 soldiers, nine other passengers and three railway employees), but the Army later reduced their 215 figure by one. Not counted in the 227 were four victims thought to be children, but whose remains were never claimed or identified. The soldiers were buried together in a mass grave in Edinburgh's Rosebank Cemetery, where an annual remembrance is held.

An official inquiry, completed on 17 June 1915 for the Board of Trade, found the cause of the collision to be neglect of the rules by two signalmen. With the northbound loop occupied, the northbound local train had been reversed onto the southbound line to allow passage of two late-running northbound sleepers. Its presence was then overlooked, and the southbound troop train was cleared for passage. As a result, both signalmen were charged with manslaughter in England, then convicted of culpable homicide after a trial in Scotland; the two terms are broadly equivalent. After they were released from a Scottish jail in 1916, they were re-employed by the railway company, although not as signalmen.

== Background ==
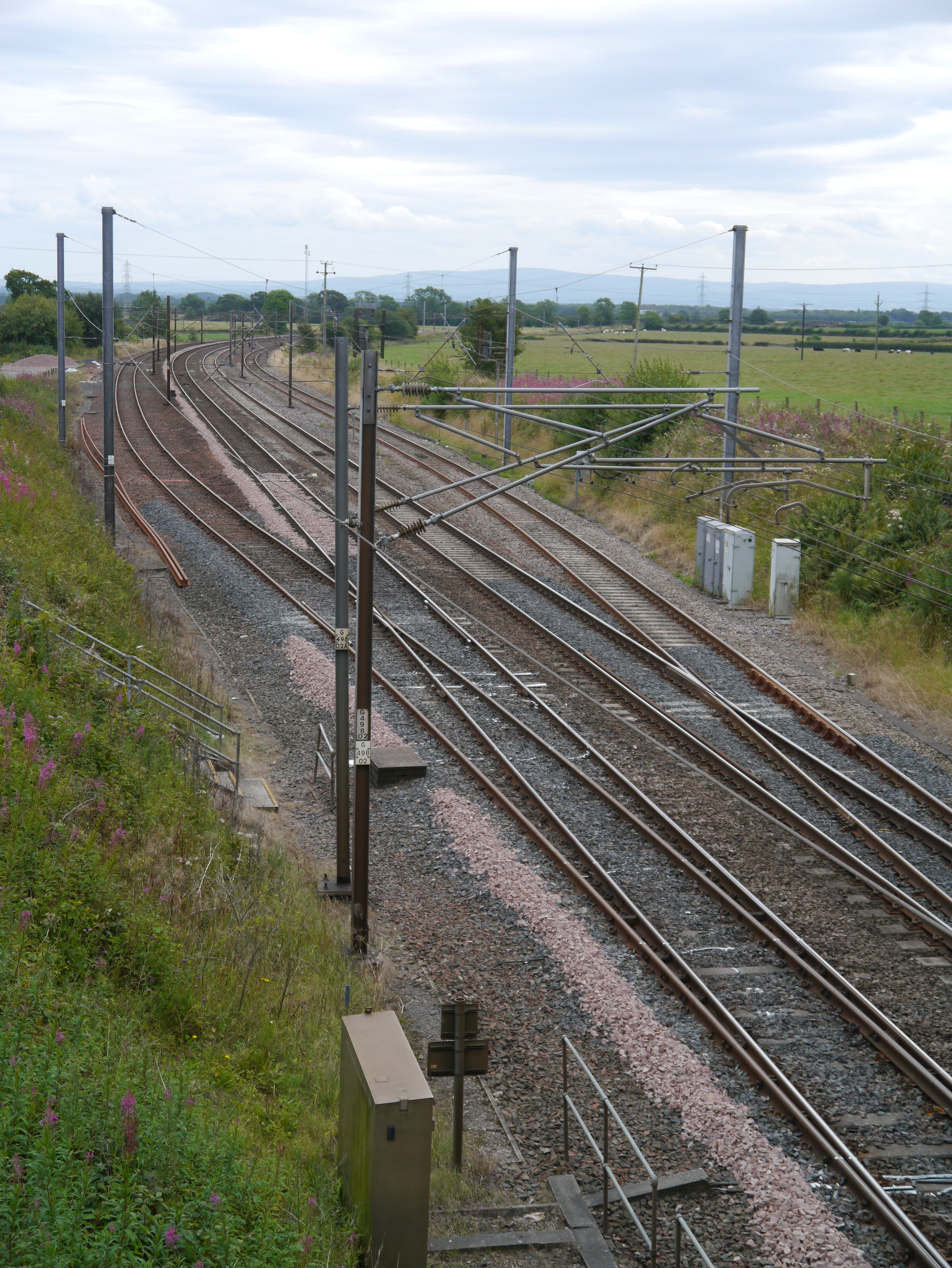
Site of the disaster photographed in 2014. Left to right: up loop; up main (where the first collision occurred); down main; down loop. The signal box was on the outside of the up loop.

The disaster occurred at Quintinshill signal box, which was an intermediate box in a remote location, sited to control two passing loops, one on each side of the double-track main line of the Caledonian Railway. On that section of the main line between Carlisle and Glasgow, in British railway parlance, Up is towards Carlisle and Down is towards Glasgow. The area around the signal box was thinly-populated countryside with scattered farms.

The Ordnance Survey 1:2500 map of 1859 (but not modern maps) shows a house named Quintinshill at approximately 55.0133°N 3.0591°W, around one-half mile (800 m) south-south-east of the signal box. The nearest settlement was Gretna, 1.5 miles (2.4 km) to the south of the box, on the Scottish side of the Anglo-Scottish border.

Responsibility for Quintinshill signal box rested with the stationmaster at Gretna railway station who, on the day of the accident, was Alexander Thorburn. The box was staffed by one signalman, on a shift system. In the mornings, a night-shift signaller would be relieved by the early-shift signaller at 6.00 am. On the day of the disaster, George Meakin was the night signalman, while James Tinsley was to work the early day shift.

At the time of the accident, normal northbound traffic through the section included two overnight sleeping car expresses, from London to Glasgow and Edinburgh, respectively, which were due to depart Carlisle at 5.50 am and 6.05 am. They were followed by an all-stations local passenger service from Carlisle to Beattock, which was advertised in the public timetable as departing Carlisle at 6.10 am but which normally departed at 6.17 am. If the sleepers ran late, the local service could not be held back to depart from Carlisle after them because precedence would then need to be given to the scheduled departure of rival companies' express trains at 6.30 am and 6.35 am. Also, any late running of the local train would cause knock-on delays to a Moffat to Glasgow and Edinburgh commuter service, with which the stopper connected at Beattock. Therefore, in the event of one or both of the sleepers running late, the stopping train would depart at its advertised time of 6.10 am, and then be shunted at one of the intermediate stations or signal boxes to allow the sleeper(s) to overtake it.

One of the locations where that could take place was Quintinshill, where there were passing loops for both Up and Down lines. If the Down (northbound) loop was occupied, as it was on the morning of the accident, then the northbound local train would be shunted, via a trailing crossover, to the Up (southbound) main line. Although not a preferred method of operation, it was allowed by the rules and was not considered a dangerous manoeuvre, provided the proper precautions were taken. In the six months before the accident, the 6.17 am local train had been shunted at Quintinshill 21 times, and on four of those occasions it had been shunted onto the Up line.

== Accident ==
=== Preceding train movements ===
Animation of the series of events causing the crash

The disaster occurred on the morning of 22 May. On this morning, both of the northbound night expresses were running late, and the northbound local train required to be shunted at Quintinshill, but the Down passing loop was occupied by the 4.50 am goods train from Carlisle. Two southbound trains were also due to pass through the box's section of track - a special freight train consisting of empty coal wagons and a special troop train.

With the Down loop occupied, night shift signalman Meakin decided to shunt the local passenger train onto the Up main line. At this point, the southbound empty coal train was standing at the Up Home signal to the north of Quintinshill, and accordingly, it was still occupying the section from Kirkpatrick (the next signalbox to the north). This meant that signalman Meakin had not yet telegraphed Kirkpatrick the "train out of section" signal for the empty coal train, which in turn meant that he could not send the "blocking back" signal to advise the Kirkpatrick signalman that the local train was standing on the Up main line. Once the local train had crossed onto the Up main line, Meakin allowed the empty coal wagon train to proceed into the Up loop. Arriving late aboard the local train, the early day shift signalman Tinsley reached Quintinshill signal box shortly after 6.30 am. At 6.34 am one of the signalmen (it was never established which) gave the "train out of section" bell to Kirkpatrick for the coal train. At this point, two crucial failures in the signalling procedure occurred (see Rules breaches).

After being relieved by signalman Tinsley, the night duty signalman Meakin remained in the signal box reading the newspaper that Tinsley had brought. Both guards from the freight trains had also entered the signal box, and war news in the newspaper was discussed. Shortly afterwards, because the local train had stood on the main line for over three minutes, pursuant to Rule 55 its driver sent fireman George Hutchinson to the box, although he left at 6.46 am, having failed to fully perform the required duties (see Rules breaches).

At 6.38 am the first of the northbound expresses from Carlisle passed Quintinshill safely. At 6.42 am Kirkpatrick "offered" the southbound troop train to Quintinshill. Signalman Tinsley immediately accepted the troop train, and four minutes later, he was offered and accepted the second northbound express from Gretna Junction. At 6.47 am, Tinsley received the "train entering section" signal from Kirkpatrick for the troop train and offered it forward to Gretna Junction, having forgotten about the local passenger train (aboard which he had arrived that morning), which was occupying the Up line. The troop special was immediately accepted by Gretna Junction, so Tinsley pulled "off" his Up home signal to allow the troop train to run forward.

=== Collisions ===
The troop train collided head-on with the stationary local train on the up line at 6.49 am. Just over a minute later, the second northbound express train ran into the wreckage, having passed the Quintinshill Down Distant signal before it could be returned to danger. The wreckage also included the goods train in the down loop and the trucks of the empty coal train in the up loop. At 6.53 am Tinsley sent the "Obstruction Danger" bell signal to both Gretna and Kirkpatrick, stopping all traffic and alerting others to the disaster.

=== Fire ===
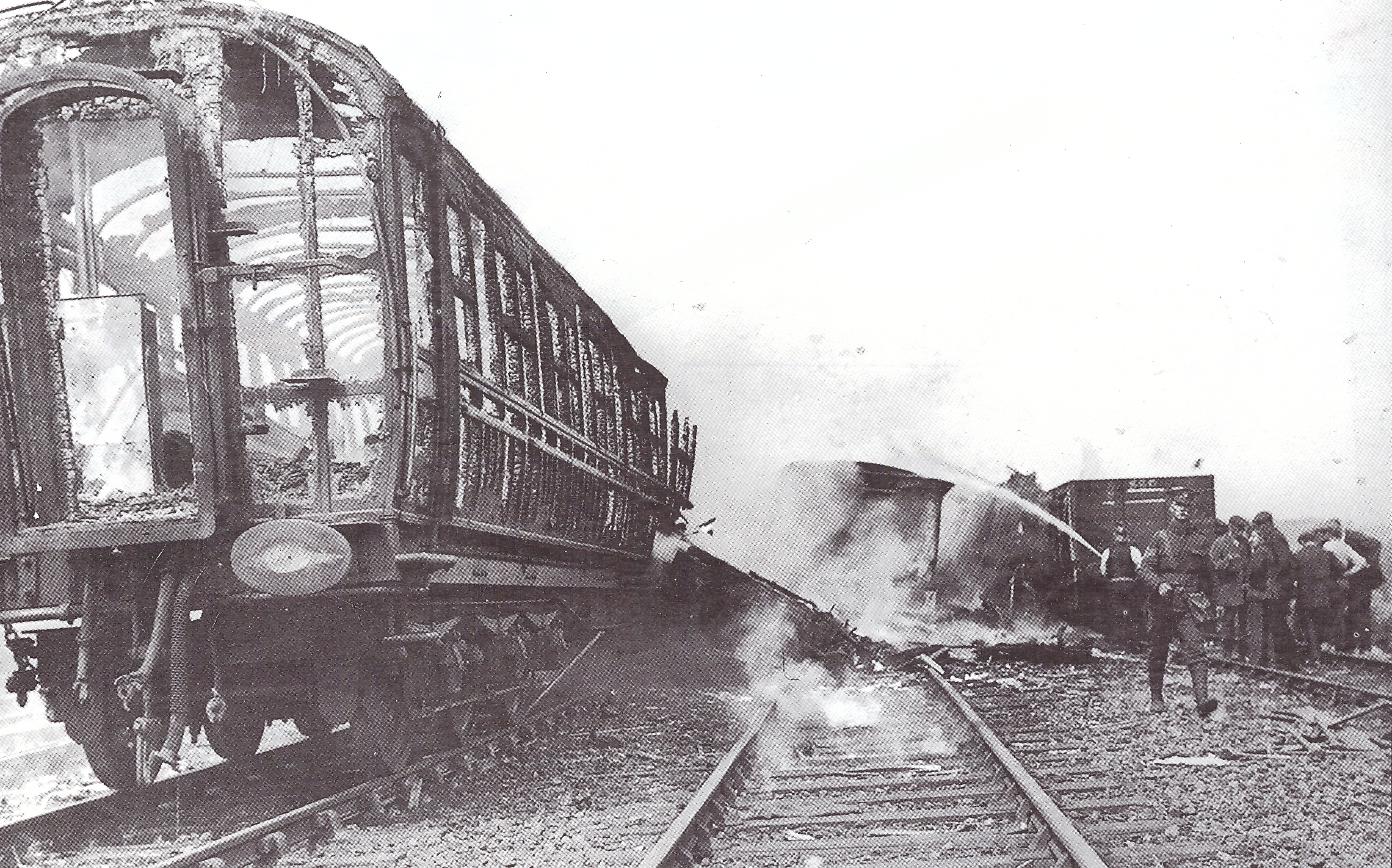
The burned out remains of a carriage at the disaster scene

Many men on the troop train were killed as a result of the two collisions, but the disaster was made much worse by a subsequent fire. The great wartime traffic and a shortage of carriages meant that the railway company had to press into service obsolete Great Central Railway stock. These carriages had wooden bodies and frames, with very little crash resistance compared with steel-framed carriages, and were gas-lit using the Pintsch gas system.

The gas was stored in reservoirs slung under the underframe, and these ruptured in the collision. Escaping gas was ignited by the coal-burning fires of the engines. The gas reservoirs had been filled before leaving Larbert, and this, combined with the lack of available water, meant that the fire was not extinguished until the morning of the next day, despite the best efforts of railway staff and the Carlisle fire brigade.

The troop train had consisted of 21 vehicles; all were consumed in the fire, apart from the rear six, which had broken away during the impact and rolled back along the line a short distance. The fire also affected four coaches from the express train and some goods wagons. Such was the intensity of the fire that all the coal in the locomotive tenders was consumed.

=== Rescue efforts ===
Amongst the first rescuers to arrive at the scene were Mr and Mrs Dunbar, caretakers at The Old Blacksmith's Shop, Gretna Green. Mrs Dunbar stated that when she heard the crash, her immediate thought was that the Germans had come. Mrs Dunbar telephoned doctors in Carlisle for assistance. Mr Dunbar spent the day assisting with the rescue efforts.

The last known survivor of the accident, Peter Stoddart, was interviewed near Wisbech by Michael Simkins in around 1985. Simkins wrote in The Guardian in 2001: "I asked him about a story I had heard of an officer who went about the scene shooting men trapped in the burning wreckage. 'That was true. I saw that. He was a Scottish gentleman, eventually a millionaire. But he had to.' There was a suspicion of a chuckle in his voice as he added: 'And there were one or two other survivors who made themselves scarce. They took their opportunity.'" Stoddart died on 4 July 1988 following a stroke.

On 16 May 2015, the BBC reported Colonel Robert Watson, a senior retired army officer who had served with the Royal Scots, saying that he believed that some soldiers were "probably" shot in mercy killings. The BBC said that while no official army records of the alleged shooting existed, "many reports written in the press at the time of the accident suggested that some trapped soldiers, threatened with the prospect of being burnt alive in the raging inferno, took their own lives or were shot by their officers". The colonel's remarks were recorded for a BBC Scotland documentary made to mark the centenary of the disaster, Quintinshill: Britain's Deadliest Rail Disaster.

He told the documentary makers: "All those that could be rescued were rescued. Many of them had amputations carried out underneath burning carriages so that they could be rescued. But many, of course, were trapped in such a position that they couldn't be got out or else the fire had taken hold, and they couldn't be got to. And, of course, since then, we've heard stories of some soldiers being shot and some soldiers possibly taking their own lives. It's never been formally documented. My own personal belief is that it probably did happen, in a sense of compassion, of mercy killing. It's almost impossible, sitting here, to comprehend what it was like that morning." The BBC said that this section of the interview with Watson would not be broadcast.

According to Earnshaw "Many were trapped inside the burning train; injured men with no hope of escape begged their rescuers to shoot them whilst gunfire added an eerie effect to the scene as small arms and rifle shells in the luggage vans began to explode in the intense heat."

== Aftermath ==
By 24 May, newspapers were already reporting the accident as the deadliest in the United Kingdom. The initial estimate was 158 dead, with over 200 injured. The bodies of the victims were initially laid in a field by the line and covered in white sheets. They were later taken to a nearby farm or to Gretna Green Village Hall. The Board of Trade appointed Lieutenant Colonel Edward Druitt, R.E. to head the inquiry into the accident. The King sent a telegram to Caledonian Railway general manager Donald Mathieson expressing sympathy and asking to be kept informed of the recovery of those injured.

On 23 May, a recruitment meeting was held at the Usher Hall, Edinburgh, to raise a new battalion. The railway was reopened through Quintinshill on the morning of 25 May, although not all the wreckage had been removed. The two locomotives of the express train stood in a siding with all their paint burnt off.

== Casualties ==
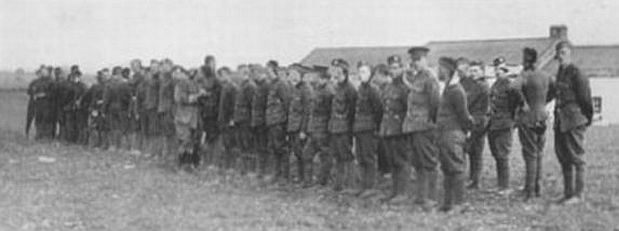
The roll call of the survivors of 1/7th Royal Scots after the accident

The overwhelming majority of fatalities were among the men of the Royal Scots. The precise number was not established as the roll list of the regiment was destroyed by the fire. Lt.-Col. Druitt's official report gives an estimated total of 215 deaths and a further 191 injured. Of the 500 soldiers of the 7th Battalion of the Royal Scots on the troop train, only 58 men were present for roll call at 4.00 pm that afternoon, along with seven officers.

In total, around 226 people died, and 246 were injured. The engine crew of the troop train also died in the first collision. Both driver Scott and fireman Hannah had driven the Royal Train.

Considering the double collision and the fire, casualties in the other trains were lighter than might have been expected. On the local train, two passengers died, with none seriously injured; on the express, seven passengers died, with a further 51 and 3 members of railway staff seriously injured.

=== Funerals ===
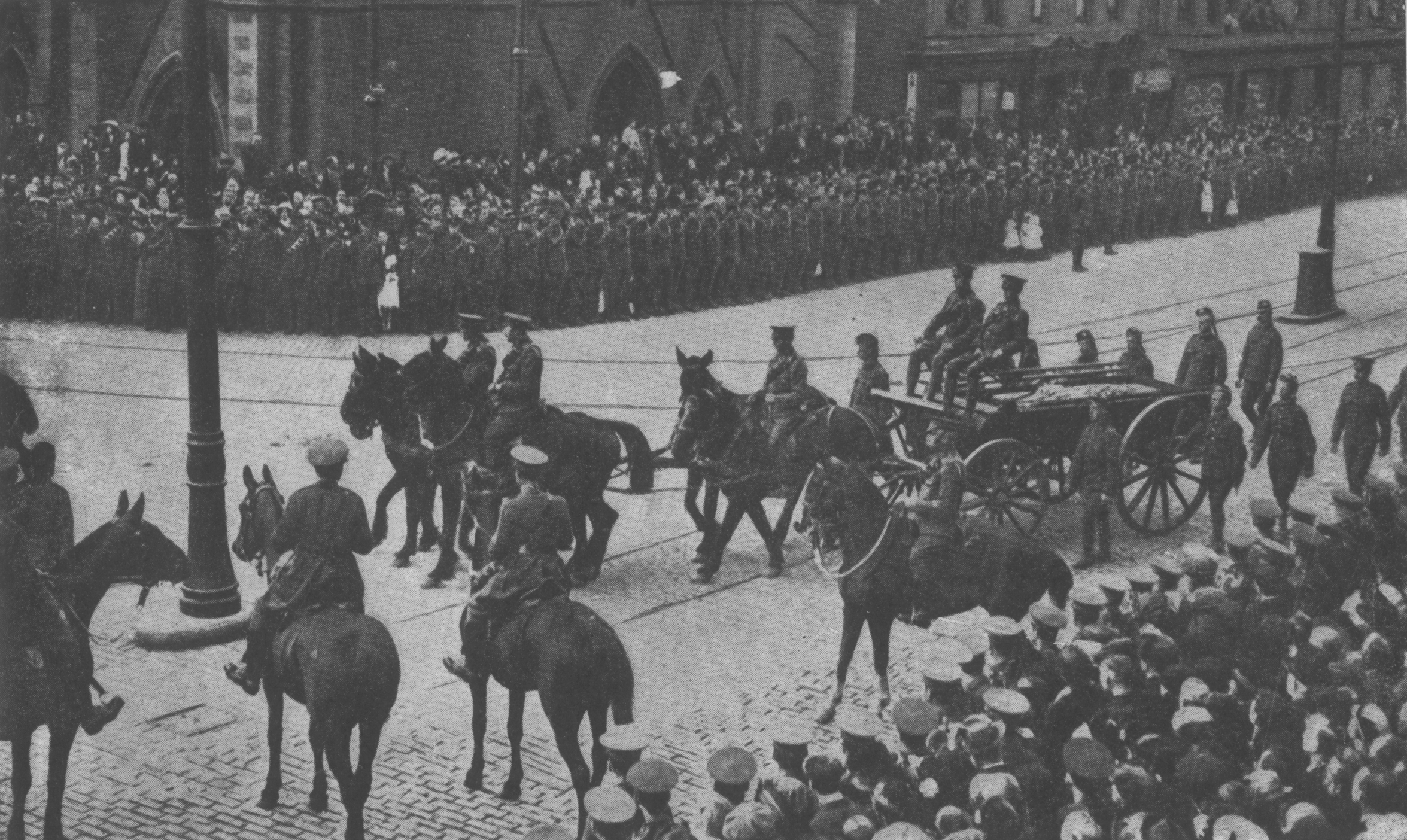
The funeral procession passes Pilrig Church on its way to the cemetery.

Some bodies were never recovered, having been wholly consumed by the fire, and when the bodies of the men of the Royal Scots were returned to Leith on 24 May, they were buried together in a mass grave in Edinburgh's Rosebank Cemetery. The coffins were laid three deep, with each on the top row covered in the Union Flag.

The public were excluded from the cemetery, although 50 wounded servicemen who were convalescing at a nearby military hospital were allowed to attend. The ceremony lasted three hours, at the end of which a volley of three shots was fired, and the Last Post was sounded.

The bodies were escorted by the 15th and 16th Battalions of Royal Scots, the Edinburgh Pals battalions recently assembled and still undergoing training. The cortege took four hours to complete its task. A memorial to the dead troops was erected in Rosebank Cemetery in 1916.

Of the troops, 83 bodies were identified, 82 were recovered but unrecognisable, and 50 were missing altogether, giving the total of 215, later revised by the army to 214. The soldiers were buried with full military honours.

Among the coffins were four bodies which were unidentified and appeared to be remains of children. One coffin was simply labelled as 'little girl, unrecognisable,' and another as 'three trunks, probably children'. As no children were reported missing, the railway company moved the bodies to Glasgow for possible identification, but no one came forward to claim the bodies; which were buried in Glasgow's Western Necropolis on 26 May. The engine crew of the troop train were both from Carlisle, and they were also buried on 26 May at Stanwix Cemetery.

=== Survivors ===
The surviving officers and men of the Royal Scots were taken to Carlisle on the evening of 22 May. The next morning, they went on by train to Liverpool, but on arrival there, they were medically examined: all the enlisted men and one officer were declared unfit for service overseas and were returned to Edinburgh. Only Lieutenant Colonel W. Carmichael Peebles and five other officers were fit enough to sail from Liverpool for overseas service. It was reported in the Edinburgh Weekly that on their march from the port to the railway station, the survivors were mistaken for prisoners of war and pelted by some children.

== Locomotives ==
There were four steam locomotives hauling the three passenger trains directly involved in the collisions, the express train having been double headed. All were designs built for the Caledonian Railway. The two locomotives that collided head-on in the first impact (when the troop train hit the local train) were both written off and scrapped. The local train's locomotive had been No. 907 of the 903 Class (4-6-0 wheel arrangement). The troop train's locomotive was No. 121 of the 139 Class (4-4-0). The two locomotives of the express train which hit the wreckage a minute later, were subsequently repaired and returned to traffic - No. 140 of the Dunalastair IV Class and No. 48 of the 43 Class (both 4-4-0).

== Investigations ==
=== Breaches of regulations ===
The sequence of events leading up to the collisions featured multiple breaches of the railway's regulations, which formed the basis of the later prosecution of both signallers. In total, eight separate rule breaches by the signalmen were identified.

==== Shift change irregularity ====
For the 6.00 am shift change, the signalmen had developed an informal arrangement allowing whoever was working the early day shift to arrive for work at around 6.30 am. This allowed the day shift signalman to get up slightly later, and in the case of Signalman Tinsley (who lived in Gretna) it enabled him to travel to work on the local train on days when it was to be shunted at Quintinshill. The signalmen at Gretna Junction would let Tinsley know when this was to occur.

To avoid this malpractice being detected by company management, whichever signalman was working the night shift would record all train register entries after 6.00 am on a piece of paper rather than in the register book itself. When the day shift man arrived, he would copy the entries from the paper into the train register in his own handwriting, making it appear that the shift change had occurred at the correct time. The changing of shifts was a safety-critical moment where it was essential that the signalman taking over the box was fully aware of the position of trains and for all block signalling requirements to be properly completed and recorded. The need for Tinsley to copy out the missing train register entries as soon as he took over the signal box may have distracted him from his duties in relation to the handover of the box and seems likely to have been a factor in his subsequent acceptance of the troop train.

==== Block signalling omissions ====
Immediately after the empty coal train had stopped in the Up loop, two crucial failures in block signalling procedure occurred.

Firstly, as soon as the "train out of section" bell code had been telegraphed to Kirkpatrick signal box to advise that the empty wagon train was out of the section and clear of the Up main line at Quintinshill, the Quintinshill signalman should have followed this up by sending the "blocking back" bell code to Kirkpatrick. This would have advised the Kirkpatrick signalman that another train (i.e. the Down local) was occupying the Up main line inside (beyond but within 1/4 mile) of the Quintinshill home signal. On receipt of the "blocking back" bell the Kirkpatrick signalman would not have been permitted to offer another Up train to Quintinshill until he had received the "obstruction removed" bell from the Quintinshill signalman to confirm that the shunted train was clear of the Up line. However, although the "train out of section" signal was belled to Kirkpatrick, the "blocking back" signal was never sent. Significantly, the "train out of section" signal was sent at 6.34 am immediately after Tinsley arrived in the signal box and at the moment when responsibility for working the box was being handed over. Both of the Quintinshill signalmen subsequently claimed that the other man had been the one to send the "train out of section" signal.

Secondly, the signalman at Quintinshill should have placed a signal lever collar over the relevant signal lever, which would have served as a physical reminder not to clear his signals for the Up line. Neither man did so, and Signalman Tinsley failed to check for the presence of a lever collar when he took over the working of the box. Meakin and Tinsley admitted in the Coroner's inquest that they did not regularly use the lever collars and this was confirmed by Hutchinson.

==== Incomplete performance of Rule 55 ====
Another important precaution designed specifically to prevent such signalling errors also failed to be implemented on that day - Rule 55. Under this rule, if any train was stopped on the main line for longer than three minutes, the driver was required to send one of the crew to the signal box in order to remind the signalman of the presence of the train and to ensure that the necessary safeguards to protect the train (e.g. lever collars on the signal levers) were in place. The crewman was required to sign the train register to confirm that he had visited the signal box and carried out these actions.

Since the local train had been stopped for longer than three minutes, its fireman, George Hutchinson, was dispatched to the box. Contrary to the rule, Hutchinson merely signed the train register, using a pen that Tinsley (who was intent on filling in the missing entries in the train register) handed over his shoulder without looking up. Hutchinson then returned to his engine without reminding the signaller of his train's position or checking that the signalman had placed a lever collar on the signal lever.

==== Unauthorised persons in signal box ====
Various railwaymen were required to visit the signal box as part of their duties, but it was expressly forbidden for such visitors to stay any longer than necessary due to the potential for the distraction of the signalman. However, signal boxes were relatively comfortable places to spend time (having a stove, kettle and the company of the signalman), so there was a temptation for such visitors to linger. When Tinsley arrived at Quintinshill signal box on the morning of the accident, the guard of the down goods train was leaving the box having been there for around ten minutes, while the guard of the up empty wagon train arrived at the same time and was still in the box when the first collision occurred 15 minutes later. Furthermore, after handing over the working of the signal box to Tinsley, Meakin remained in the box reading the newspaper. The unnecessary presence of these other railwaymen may have further distracted Tinsley from his duties.

==== Forgetfulness ====
The failure to carry out the "blocking back" procedure enabled the Kirkpatrick signalman to offer the up troop train to Quintinshill, but as the down local train was standing on the Up main line within the clearing point of the Quintinshill home signal, the block regulations prohibited Tinsley from accepting the troop train without extra precautions. However, despite the fact that he had travelled to work on the footplate of the local train minutes earlier and that the train was standing in clear sight directly in front of the signal box, Tinsley forgot about its presence. He, therefore, accepted the troop train and offered it forward to Gretna Junction, where it was accepted. In the absence of a lever collar on the Up Home signal lever to remind him the line was blocked, he pulled off the Up line signals to allow the troop train to run through Quintinshill.

=== Board of Trade inquiry ===
The first official investigation into the disaster commenced in Carlisle on 25 May at County Hall, Carlisle. It was conducted by Lieutenant Colonel Edward Druitt RE of the Railway Inspectorate on behalf of the Board of Trade. Druitt had already spent some time at the accident site and spent the day in Carlisle interviewing witnesses, including both Meakin and Tinsley. Both men were honest about their failures to abide by the rules and their generally lax behaviour. Druitt presented his report to the Board of Trade on 17 June 1915 and laid the blame squarely on Meakin and Tinsley.

This disastrous collision was thus due to want of discipline on the part of the signalmen, first by changing duty at an unauthorised hour, which caused Tinsley to be occupied in writing up the Train Register Book, and so diverted his attention from his proper work, secondly by Meakin handing over the duty in a very lax manner; and, thirdly by both signalmen neglecting to carry out various rules specially framed for preventing accidents due to forgetfulness on the part of signalmen.

Druitt was also critical of Hutchinson for his failure to comply properly with Rule 55, and also of Gretna stationmaster Alexander Thorburn, who, in Druitt's opinion, cannot have been unaware of the irregular shift changes operated by Meakin and Tinsley.

Druitt concluded that even had all the trains been lit by electricity, a fire would still have occurred as the wagons of the goods train in the down loop caught fire. He also concluded that had Quintinshill been equipped with track circuiting, then the accident would have been avoided as the electrical interlocking of the signals would have prevented Tinsley from pulling the relevant signal levers, but that with its simple layout and good visibility from the signal box Quintinshill was a low priority for track circuits to be installed.

=== Coroner's inquest in England ===
The legal position was complicated because although the accident occurred in Scotland, some of the injured subsequently died in England where the law was different. In Scotland, deaths were investigated by the procurator fiscal who, if he found culpability on the part of anyone, could order their arrest and charge them with culpable homicide. (Note: The charge of manslaughter is not known to Scottish law, culpable homicide is the equivalent.) In England, the coroner investigated the death and, if the coroner's jury found that death was due to neglect, then the coroner could indict charges of manslaughter against the named parties. The coroner for Carlisle, T S Strong, asked for guidance from the Home Office and was instructed to conduct inquests on those who had died in England in the normal way. The inquest opened on 25 May but was immediately adjourned until 23 June to allow Druitt to finish his investigation. After two days hearing evidence from, among others, Tinsley, Meakin and Hutchinson, Strong summed up the evidence to the nineteen-man jury. He highlighted that if Meakin and Tinsley had obeyed the rules on any of (a) blocking back, (b) lever collars, or (c) a correctly kept train register, they could not have forgotten the stationary train. He concluded his summing up with:

If you find as a result of your deliberations that the rules and safeguards were broken by one or more of the railwaymen concerned, or in other words that they have been negligent, there remains one point which you must decide, and it is this.

Was that negligence of such a character—having regard to all the surroundings—as to be culpable negligence, or in other words gross negligence?

If so it was manslaughter.

The jury retired and an hour later came back with a verdict that the 27 people who were the subject of the inquest had died due to the gross negligence of Tinsley, Meakin and Hutchinson. The coroner, therefore, committed all three to the next sitting of Cumberland Assizes on a charge of manslaughter; all three were granted bail.

The solicitor representing the three railwaymen protested that the committing of them to trial was outside the coroner's jurisdiction, as the alleged offence had been committed in Scotland. The coroner stated that he had been instructed to proceed with the inquest by the Home Office. The verdict of the English inquest was to leave Tinsley in an unusual position, as he was arrested by the Scottish authorities on 29 May 1915, and charged with culpable homicide. He now faced a charge of manslaughter in England based on the same facts. After discussion between the Law Officers of England and Scotland, it was decided to proceed against the three men in Scotland.

The three had become the first men ever to be indicted for the same crime in two UK countries.

=== Trial of Tinsley, Meakin and Hutchinson ===
The trial of the three men started on 24 September 1915 in the High Court in Edinburgh. The Lord Justice General, Lord Strathclyde, presided over the trial; the Lord Advocate, Robert Munro KC prosecuted and the three men were defended by Condie Sandeman KC. Tinsley, Meakin and Hutchinson all pleaded not guilty to the charges of culpable homicide and breach of duty against them. The trial lasted a day and a half; after the prosecution had concluded their case, Sandeman submitted to the Lord Justice General that there was no case to answer by Hutchinson. The Lord Justice General accepted this submission, and the jury was instructed to find him not guilty at the conclusion of the trial. Sandeman called no witnesses on the part of Meakin and Tinsley but instead sought to persuade the jury that neither had been criminally negligent but that Tinsley had just had a momentary loss of memory.

After Sandeman's speech, Lord Strathclyde summed up to the jury, ending:

At 6.43 am on the morning of the day in question, the men in the signal box at Quintinshill were asked to accept the troop train coming from the north. They accepted it. That meant that they gave the signal to the north that the line was clear and that the troop train might safely come on. At that very moment when the signal was given, there was before the very eyes of the men in the signal box a local train which was obstructing the line on which the troop train was to run. One man in the signal box had actually left the train a few minutes before, just at the time when it was being shunted onto the up line. The other man had a few minutes before directed the local train to leave the down main and go on to the up main.

That is the staggering fact that confronts you.

If you can explain that fact consistently with the two men having faithfully and honestly discharged their duties you should acquit them. If you cannot explain that staggering fact consistently with the men having faithfully discharged their duties then you must convict them.

The jury retired to consider their verdicts at 12.40 pm and returned only eight minutes later, finding Hutchinson not guilty as directed but finding Tinsley and Meakin guilty as charged. After hearing mitigation on behalf of the two Lord Strathclyde sentenced Tinsley to three years penal servitude and Meakin to eighteen months imprisonment.

=== Fatal accident inquiry in Scotland ===
The final legal inquiry into the disaster was held on 4 November 1915 in Dumfries and was an inquiry under the Fatal Accidents Inquiry (Scotland) Act 1895 into the deaths of the crew of the troop train. Presided over by Sheriff Campion, it came to the same conclusion as the English inquest and the trial that if Meakin and Tinsley had followed the rules, then the accident would not have happened.

== After the trial ==
Meakin and Tinsley were released from prison on 15 December 1916. After release, Tinsley went straight back to working on the Caledonian Railway as a lampman. He died in 1967. Meakin also returned to the railway as a goods train guard. Some years later, he was fired from that job and set himself up as a coal merchant, trading from Quintinshill siding, right next to the scene of the crash. During World War II, he worked in the Gretna munitions factory until he retired due to ill health. He died in 1953.

The pair were neither the first nor the last signalmen to be convicted for their part in causing an accident. James Holmes was tried for manslaughter following the 1892 Thirsk rail crash but was given an absolute discharge. Signalman Frost was gaoled for two years for his part in causing the Connington South rail crash in 1967.

== 2015 BBC re-examination ==
In a BBC Television documentary, Britain's Deadliest Rail Disaster: Quintinshill, first aired on 20 May 2015, the disaster was re-examined from a modern perspective. It argued that both signalmen had been made scapegoats for the crashes and found fault with both the railway company and the government (who ran the railway in wartime). Going further, citing the fact both men returned to work after their sentences, it postulated there had been some conspiracy between the company and the men to take sole blame for the accident.

It criticised the railway company's attitude to its own rules, which the documentary alleged it must have known were not routinely followed to the letter - arguing that the tardy practices of turning up late for a shift change would have, at the very least, been known to their immediate managers. It also claimed the use of safety collars was not universal on the railway and expected it was impractical (citing that some railway companies did not use them for just that reason).

It also found fault with the railway company's desire to run a peacetime service to maintain profits, even though the network was experiencing extra war-time traffic. Citing the pressure this would have put on signal staff to maintain the service, it also argued that the local train would not have even been on the main line if the passing loops had not been being used as storage sidings to store extra trains. It also criticised the railway company and the government for using the older wooden stock for the troop train, arguing that it was already known it was unsafe and in the process of withdrawal. This was a risk that was not justified even in the environment of war.

It also sought to take some blame away from Tinsley because he may have been suffering from a form of epilepsy which affected his short-term memory, which they argued would have explained why he might have simply not been aware of the waiting local train.

== Memorials ==
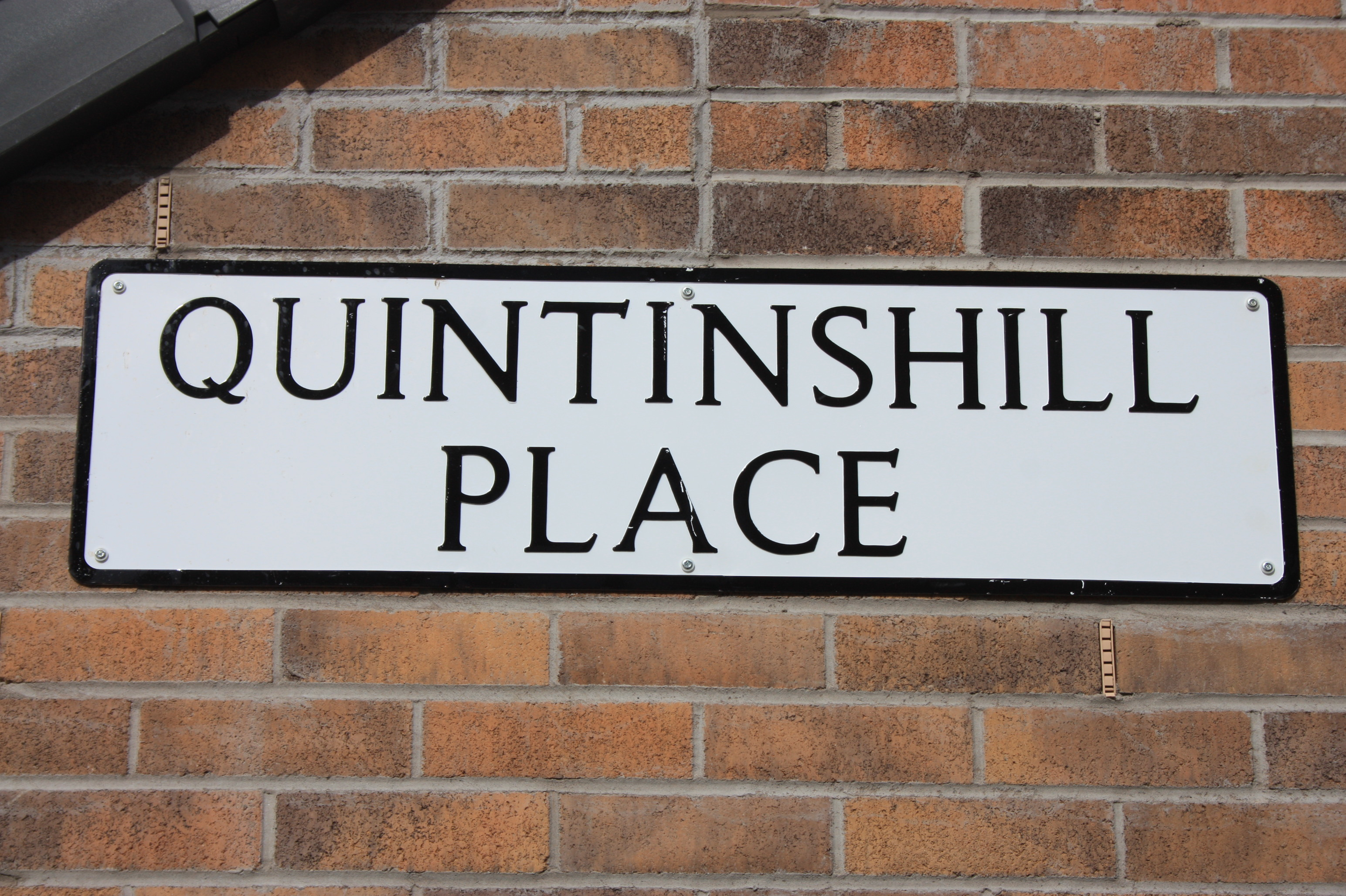
Quintinshill Place, Edinburgh

As well as the memorial in Rosebank Cemetery, there is a plaque at Larbert railway station, from where the soldiers originally departed. Two memorials have been erected by the Western Front Association, the first in 1995, half a mile to the south of the scene of the accident. The second is at Blacksyke Bridge, west of the scene; it was unveiled in September 2010. A memorial to the unknown children was erected at the Western Necropolis in Glasgow in 2011. There is also a memorial to Lt Cdr C H E Head, who died in the accident, in St Ann's Church at Portsea, Hampshire.

Annual remembrance services are held at Rosebank Cemetery attended by the Lord Provost of Edinburgh and the Royal Scots association. There were commemorative services at Gretna for the centenary of the disaster on 22 May 2015 and at Rosebank Cemetery on 23 May. They were attended by the First Minister of Scotland, Nicola Sturgeon, and the Princess Royal.

Gretna Memorial, Rosebank Cemetery

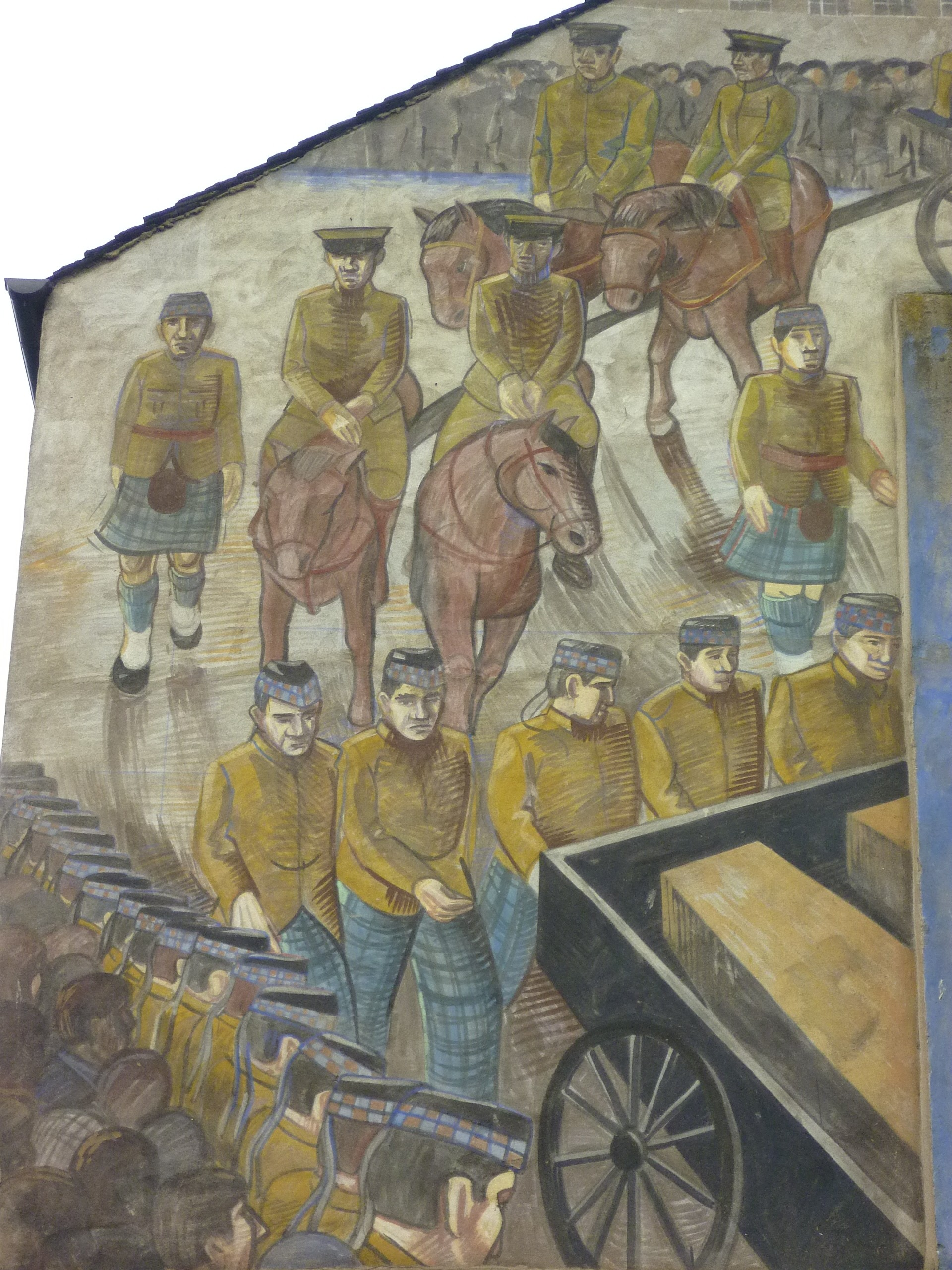
Leith tenement mural depicting the funeral procession

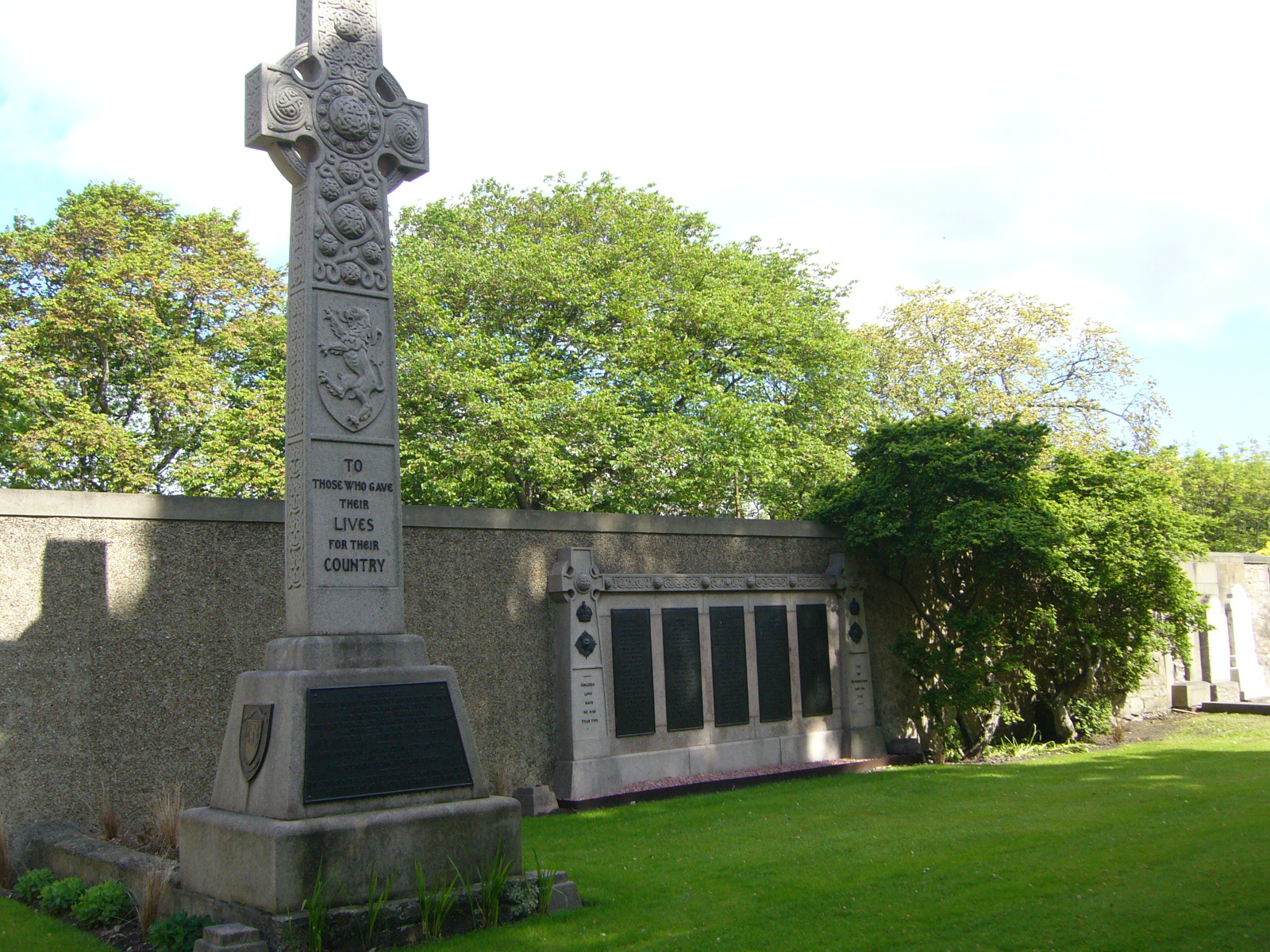
The Rosebank Cemetery Memorial

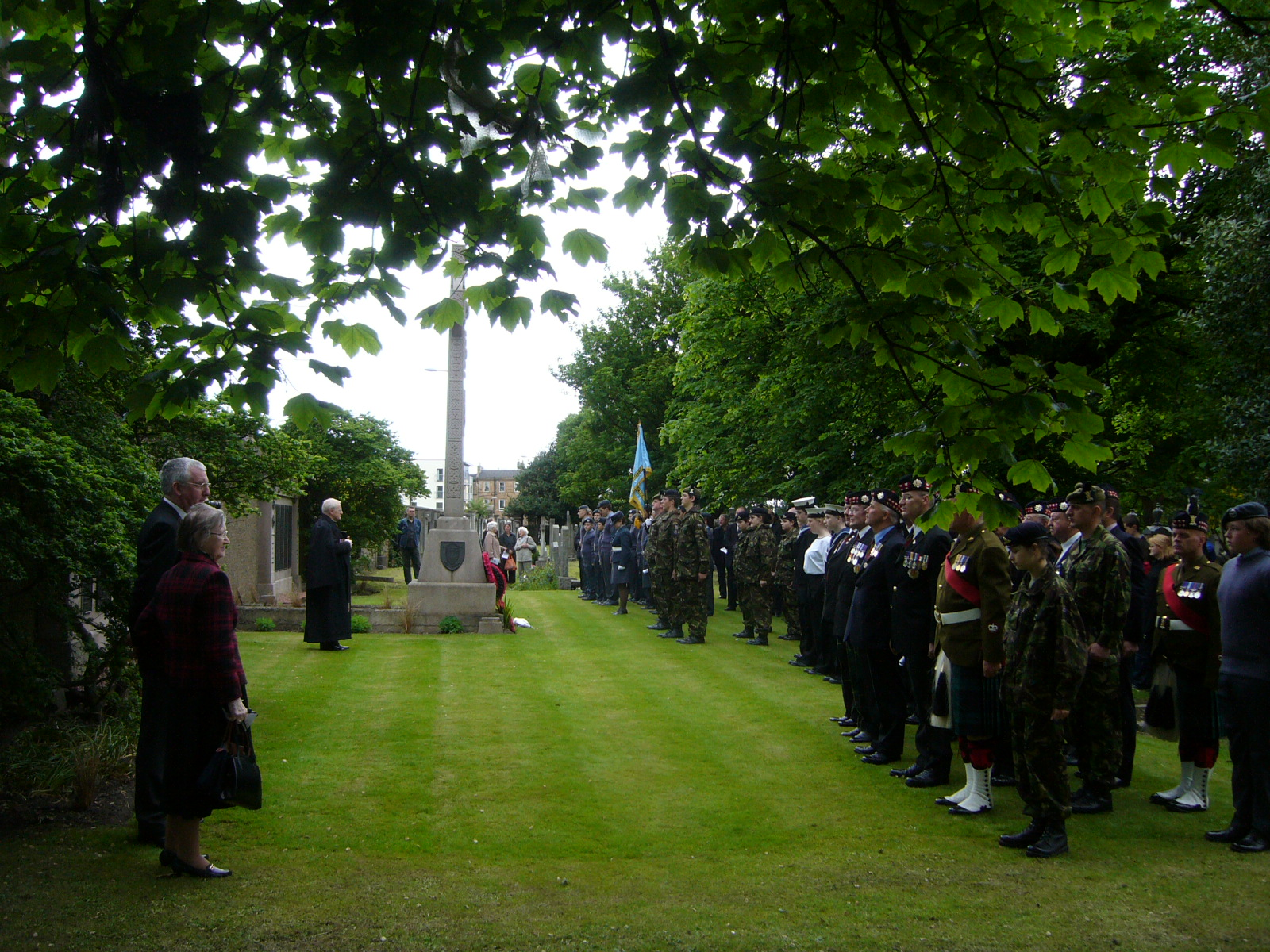
Remembrance Service at Rosebank Cemetery, 2010

On 22 May 2015, a remembrance quarter peal was rung and new method named 'Quintinshill' by bellringers at St Peter's Church, Derby.

In 2017 a new housing area in Leith was given the street names Quintinshill Place and Gretna Place in memory of the disaster.

== Similar accidents ==
The Hawes Junction rail crash of 1910 also involved a busy signalman forgetting about a train on the main railway line. Likewise, at the Winwick rail crash of 1934, an overworked signalman forgot about a train in his section, and was misled by a junior.

== See also ==
- 1915 in rail transport
- List of rail accidents in the United Kingdom
- List of United Kingdom disasters by death toll
- List of transportation fires
