= Discharge (sentence) =

Court sentence with no punishment attached

A discharge is a type of sentence imposed by a court whereby no punishment is imposed.

An absolute discharge is an unconditional discharge whereby the court finds that a crime has technically been committed but that any punishment of the defendant would be inappropriate and the case is closed. In some jurisdictions, an absolute discharge means there is no conviction on the defendant's record, despite the plea of the defendant.

A conditional discharge is an order made by a criminal court whereby an offender will not be sentenced for an offence unless a further offence is committed within a stated period. Once the stated period has elapsed and no further offence is committed then the conviction may be removed from the defendant's record.

== Australia ==
In Australia, offenders can be discharged without being convicted, with or without being placed on a good behaviour bond (or other conditions). The sentencing options vary from state to state. Defendants can be discharged without conviction even if they plead guilty to the alleged crime. The sentence vitiates the finding of guilt.

== Canada ==
In Canada, a discharge is a sentence passed in criminal court whereby an individual is found guilty of an offence but is deemed not to have been convicted. Although a discharge is not considered a conviction, a record of an absolute or conditional discharge is kept by Canadian Police Information Centre (CPIC) and by the charging police agency and is purged from the individual's police record after a period of time: one year in the case of an absolute discharge, three years for a conditional discharge. The Criminal Records Act states that except in exceptional circumstances, if the discharge is conditional, no record may be disclosed after three years. No conviction occurs, but the offender is required to fulfill certain conditions as part of the sentence. The offender is put on probation for a period of up to three years.

In the case of a conditional discharge, an offender who fails to meet the conditions of the probation or commits another criminal offence during the probation period may be returned to court, have the discharge to be cancelled, and receive a criminal conviction and sentence for both the original offence and breach of probation. If the conditions of the discharge are met, it becomes an absolute discharge.

A court may grant a conditional or absolute discharge only for offences with no minimum penalty and a maximum penalty of less than fourteen years.

== Malaysia ==
Malaysia's Criminal Procedure Code allows for a magistrate in a summary trial to make a discharge amounting to an acquittal under section 173(g) if the court considers the charge to be groundless. In contrast, the public prosecutor may apply to the court for discharge not amounting to an acquittal (DNAA) under section 254. In the latter case proceedings on the charge are stayed but the accused may be charged again with the same offence in the future.

For example, in 2020, Riza Aziz was discharged not amounting to an acquittal (DNAA) from five money laundering charges over US$248 million (RM1.25 billion), he had misappropriated from sovereign wealth fund 1Malaysia Development Berhad.

== New Zealand ==
In New Zealand, offenders can be "convicted and discharged" (a criminal record is received but no other punishment) or "discharged without conviction" (no punishment and no criminal record). Defendants can be discharged without conviction even if they plead guilty to the alleged crime, usually in cases that the negative impacts of a conviction far outweigh the crime committed. For example, if a high-end businessman is caught in possession of a small quantity of marijuana, the small nature of the crime compared to the effects a conviction, without a sentence, would have may cause him to discharged without conviction.

== United Kingdom ==
=== England and Wales ===
In England and Wales, a conditional discharge is a sentence vitiating the finding of guilt in which the offender receives no punishment if in a period set by the court (not more than three years), no further offence is committed. If an offence is committed in that time, the offender may also be re-sentenced for the offence for which a conditional discharge was given. Pursuant to section 82(2) of the Sentencing Act 2020 and R v Patel, the conditional discharge does not constitute a conviction unless the individual breaches the conditional discharge and is resentenced. The end of the rehabilitation period under the Rehabilitation of Offenders Act 1974 is the day when the conditional discharge order ends, or immediately for an absolute discharge. Then, the offence is treated in law for most purposes (such as in court proceedings, employment, and insurance) as if the offender had not committed it.

An absolute discharge is a lesser sentence imposed by a court in which no penalty is imposed at all. Exceptionally, however, a court occasionally grants an absolute discharge for a very serious offence when presented with extenuating circumstances (the signalman in the Thirsk rail crash, who was found guilty of manslaughter, is an example). That usually signifies that while a crime may technically have been committed, the imposition of any punishment would, in the opinion of the judge or magistrates, be inappropriate. In 2015, Hubert Chesshyre was found to have sexually abused a choirboy, but a stroke and the onset of dementia made the court find that he was deemed unfit to plead and he was granted an absolute discharge.

A court passing a discharge may still order the defendant to pay compensation to a victim, pay a contribution towards the prosecution's costs, or be disqualified from driving. A court may grant a discharge only if it is "inexpedient to inflict punishment" and may not do so where a mandatory sentence applies, including certain firearms offences and "three strikes" offenders. The law on discharges is set out in Part 5 of the Sentencing Act 2020.

In 2008, 9,734 offenders were given absolute discharges (0.7% of sentences) and 87,722 offenders were given conditional discharges (6% of sentences).

=== Scotland ===
In Scots law, there is no conditional discharge similar to that in England and Wales, but admonition has a similar effect with a conviction recorded although there is no punishment. However, section 246 of the Criminal Procedure (Scotland) Act 1995 provides that in dealing with cases other than where the sentence is fixed by law (such as murder):

- In cases on indictment, if it appears to the court, having regard to the circumstances including the nature of the offence and the character of the offender, that it is inexpedient to inflict punishment and that a probation order is not appropriate it may instead of sentencing him make an order discharging him absolutely.
- In summary cases, if the court is satisfied that the person committed the offence, and it is of the opinion, having regard to the circumstances including the nature of the offence and the character of the offender, that it is inexpedient to inflict punishment and that a probation order is not appropriate may without proceeding to conviction make an order discharging him absolutely.

Section 247 further provides that an absolute discharge shall be deemed not to be a conviction for any purpose other than the purposes of the proceedings in which the order is made and of laying it before a court as a previous conviction in subsequent proceedings for another offence, and shall in any event be disregarded for the purposes of any enactment which imposes any disqualification or disability upon convicted persons, or authorises or requires the imposition of any such disqualification or disability. However, courts can consider previous absolute discharges in the same way as they consider previous convictions.

== United States ==
The meaning of absolute or conditional discharge does not exist as such in United States law. However, different jurisdictions within the United States have a variety of analogues. The most direct is the suspended sentence or sentencing to "time served", meaning time spent in custody until sentencing. Many or most states also have alternative forms of adjudication for which a defendant may apply. Such measures are typically available only to first offenders facing non-felony charges and typically exclude certain types of charges, depending on the state. Such possibilities often include a guilty plea followed by a special form of probation, successful completion of which seals the public record of the case and expunges the offender's criminal record.

In rare cases, the judge can determine that no practical punishment is available and sentence the defendant to an "unconditional discharge" (absolute discharge), such as in The People of the State of New York v. Donald J. Trump.
