= 1940 Norton Fitzwarren rail crash =

Railway incident in Somerset, England

Coordinates: 51.023°N 3.149°W

Norton Fitzwarren rail crash

Details
- Date: 4 November 1940; 03:47
- Location: Norton Fitzwarren, Somerset
- Country: England
- Line: Reading to Plymouth Line
- Operator: Great Western Railway
- Cause: Signal passed at danger

Statistics
- Trains: 1
- Passengers: ~900
- Deaths: 27
- Injured: 74

The Norton Fitzwarren rail crash occurred on 4 November 1940 between Taunton and Norton Fitzwarren in the English county of Somerset, when the driver of a train misunderstood the signalling and track layout, causing him to drive the train through a set of points and off the rails at approximately 40 miles per hour (64 km/h). 27 people were killed. The locomotive involved was GWR King Class GWR 6028 King Class King George VI which was subsequently repaired and returned to service. A previous significant accident occurred here on 10 November 1890 and the Taunton train fire of 1978 was also within 2 miles (3.2 km).

== Overview ==
A simplified track and signal diagram of the Norton Fitzwarren crash. The train went through the catch (trap) points at the end of the Down Relief (Slow) Line.

The house of the driver, Percy Stacey, had been bombed the previous night. He had gone to work as usual. Further bombing on the night of the accident and other disruptions had made the train an hour late by the time it reached Taunton.

The crash occurred at a point on the railway where four tracks were reduced to two. On the four-track section, the up and down fast lines were in the centre between the up and down slow lines. Instead of the usual practice of locating all signals on the same side of their respective tracks (GWR practice was to commonly put them to the right of the track, the same side their drivers stood on the locomotive), the Relief Line signals were on the left, and the Main Line signals were on the right.

Stacey's train left Taunton station observing the indications of the right-hand signals (all green, indicating "proceed" for the Down Main line), not realizing his train was travelling on the Down Relief (left-hand) track and the signals were showing clear for another train coming from behind on the adjacent track. Wartime blackout conditions at night contributed to this misapprehension. The driver only realised his mistake when the other train overtook him, by which time it was too late to stop before the track ended. As trap points were in place, the train was derailed rather than running onto the fast line and colliding with the other train. The fireman and 26 passengers were killed.

The guard in the end vehicle of the overtaking train was alarmed by strange noises, which later turned out to be ballast thrown up by the derailing train alongside. He applied his own brakes to check what might be the problem, the train was stopped at Victory Siding, the next signalbox to the west, and he discovered the sides of the last vehicles were scored from flying ballast, and there were broken windows. The derailing "King" locomotive had nosed down off the end of the overrun siding and then swung across the main tracks, what must have been feet behind the overtaking train.

Also, the signalman at Taunton station had initially cleared the starting signal for the usual route at the west end of the platform, to cross over to the Down Main line, which was showing when the train stopped at the platform. While the train was stopped the signalman was offered the faster non-stopping train, so restored the signal, changed the route of the crashed train from the Down Fast to the Down Slow, and cleared the Down Slow signal. The driver was on the opposite side of the locomotive to the signal, and the fireman, who performed a second check at departure, reported as usual "it's clear". Because of the slow speed of departure, in blackout conditions, the driver never noticed they were now continuing on the Down Relief line and not taking the crossover to the Down Main.

The signals had been badly placed as an economy measure. If at least one pair of signals had been placed as usual – requiring a gantry or a bracket – then the driver of the train would have been more likely to recognise which track he was on and which signals related to it.

The extra space between the Fast lines was a holdover from the wide track centres of Brunel's broad gauge.

The signals at Norton Fitzwarren railway station were fitted with the GWR Automatic Train Control (ATC) which alerted the driver, in the cab, audibly that the approaching distant signal is at "caution". A warning signal has to be acknowledged or the brakes are applied. Drivers can be so used to cancelling the warning, that they may do this subconsciously. This would especially happen if the driver is reading the wrong green signal. Although the ATC equipment was working correctly, wartime deferred maintenance had meant that in a number of cases the ATC ramps were not working correctly and were giving false "caution" alerts when the signals were clear, supposedly a correct failure mode but one which led to crews believing that a warning when they saw clear signals was just another maintenance issue.

== Inquiry ==
The inquiry was conducted by the Chief Inspecting Officer of the Railway Inspectorate, Sir Alan Mount. He concluded that although the position of the signals was confusing, the "sole cause was an unaccountable lapse on the part of Driver P.W. Stacey" despite his excellent record of 40 years of service. He suggested that operating under conditions of blackout and the general strain of the war, including Stacey's own house being bombed the previous night, may have been a factor in this lapse.

== Wartime censorship ==
This accident was reported soon after in newspapers in far off Australia. The cause was attributed to a culvert washaway caused by recent heavy rains, and no mention was made that the locomotive was a namesake of the reigning monarch.

== Aftermath ==
Despite a considerable amount of sympathy for Driver Stacey, he never forgave himself for the accident. When asked for a comment by the press, he said "don't talk to me, I'm a murderer". He died just over a year later for no apparent medical reason.

== See also ==
- List of train accidents
