= Julius Pintsch =

German tinsmith, manufacturer and inventor

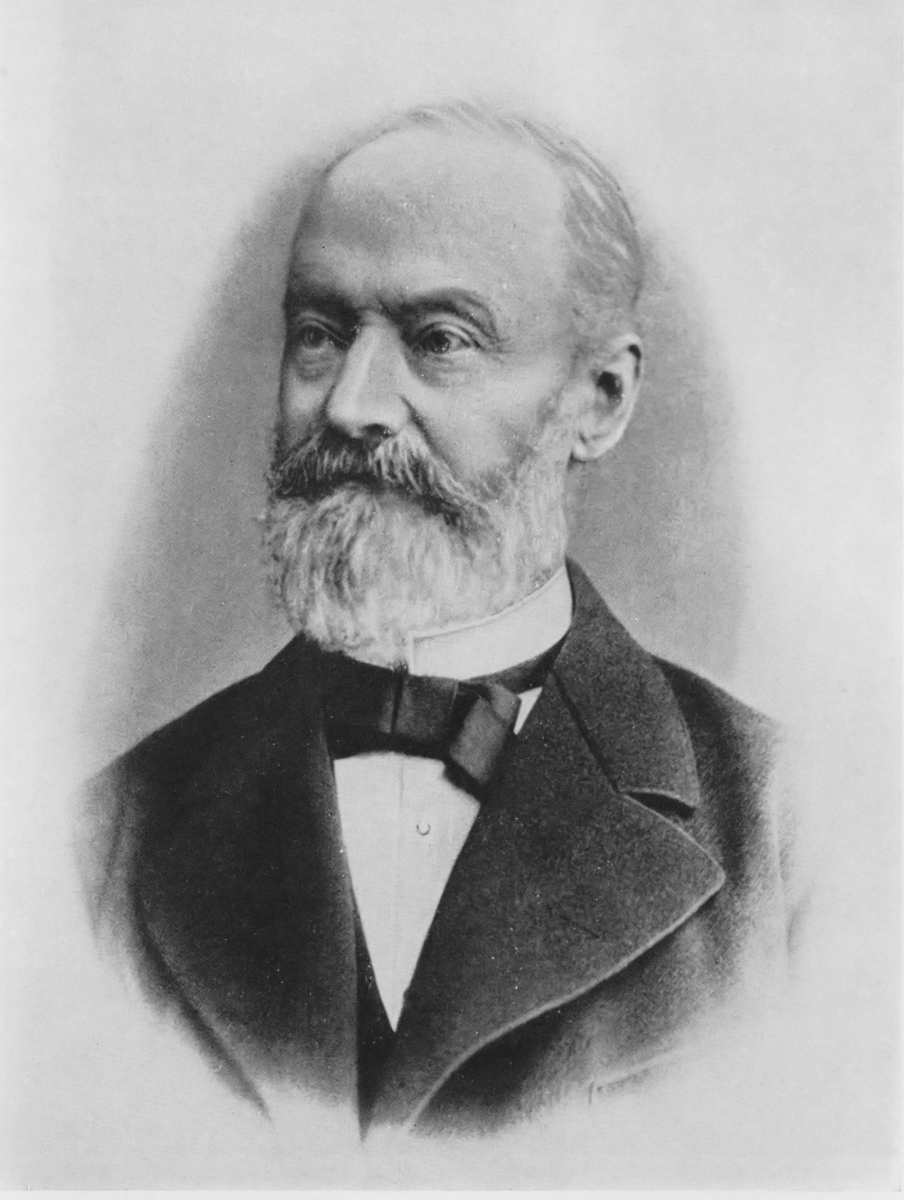
Julius Pintsch

Carl Friedrich Julius Pintsch (6 January 1815 – 20 January 1884) was a German tinsmith, manufacturer and inventor who is primarily known for the invention of Pintsch gas. The gas, distilled from naphtha or other petroleum products, was widely used in railway transport and marine navigation applications from its invention in 1851 until the 1930s.

== Life ==
Born in Berlin, Pintsch completed an apprenticeship as a tinsmith in 1833 and, after his Wanderjahre, took up a position at a local lamp factory. Having obtained his Meister certificate, he established his own small workshop near the municipal gasworks at Frankfurter Bahnhof in Berlin-Friedrichshain, in 1843.

While the City of Berlin continuously enlarged its gas network in order to supply the growing population, Pintsch received numerous repair orders from the public GASAG utility company. He achieved major success in 1847 with the development of a reliable gas meter that was used by the city administration and would eventually be used worldwide.

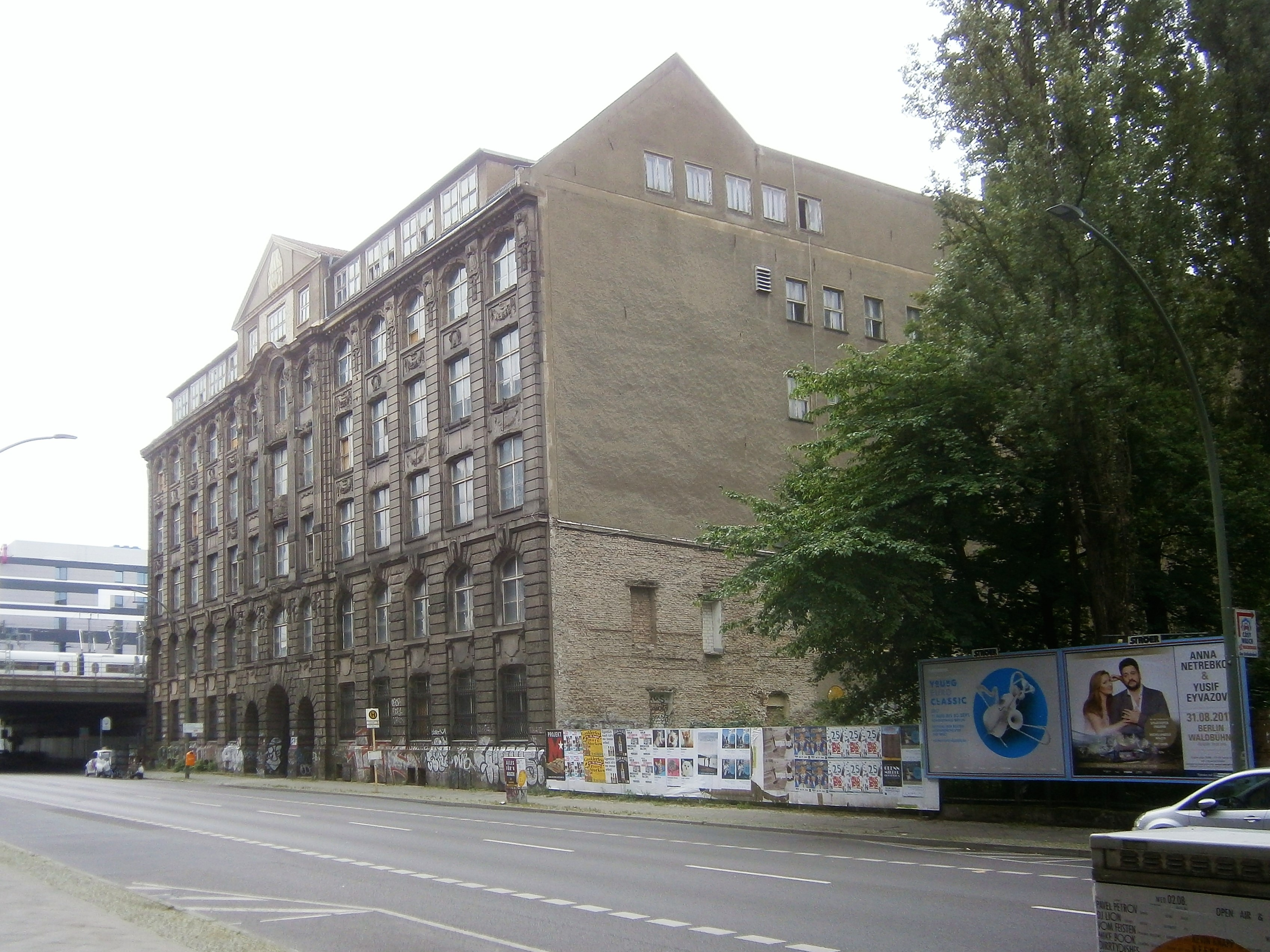
Former Pintsch factory building on Andreasstrasse

In 1851, he created a gas lamp that was suitable for use in railroad cars. The lamps were illuminated by Pintsch gas, a long-burning oil gas that would remain lit during the rough motion of train journeys. Pintsch gas was essentially purified, compressed gas distilled from naphtha, that was regulated and reduced to 1/3 ounce per square inch of pressure to the burner. Pintsch gas was later replaced by an improved Blau gas for railroad car usage.

Starting in 1863, Pintsch had a large factory built on Andreasstrasse in Berlin, followed by subsidiaries in Dresden, Breslau, Frankfurt, Utrecht and Fürstenwalde. Those plants designed and constructed a wide range of gas-related devices including gas meters, gas pressure regulators, and gas analyzers.

After his death in 1884 in Fürstenwalde, his sons Richard, Oskar, Julius Karl, and Albert inherited the business and became successful in the manufacture of compressed Pintsch gas for use in beacons and unmanned lighthouses. Products included gas mantle lamps, as well as light buoys used in the Kronstadt Bay and the Suez Canal. In 1907, the business was transformed into a public limited company (AG). Some branches were later acquired by the Schaltbau GmbH Munich.

== Pintsch gas ==
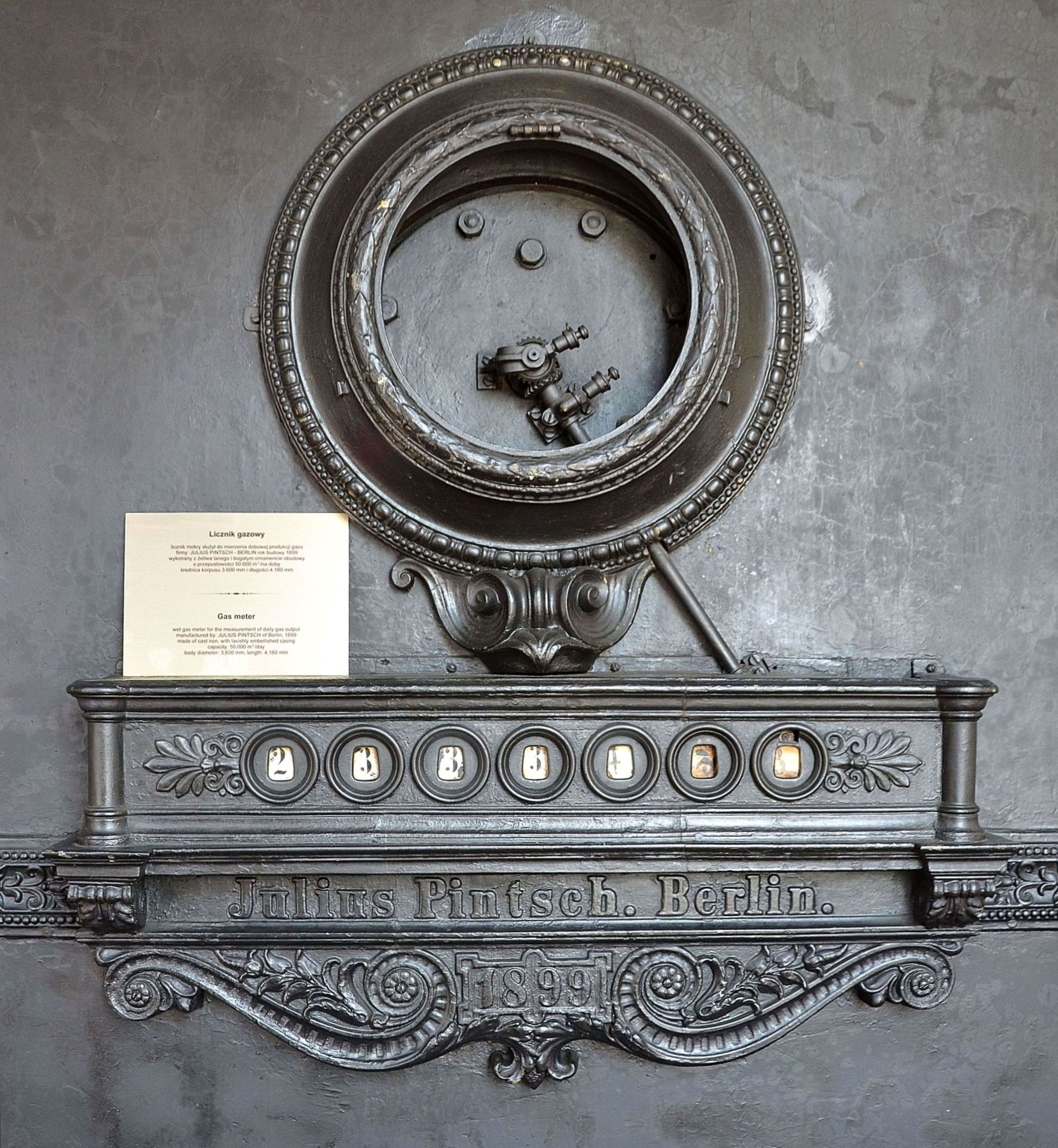
Gas meter manufactured by Julius Pintsch, Gas Museum, Warsaw

Pintsch gas was a compressed fuel gas invented by Pintsch, which was derived from distilled naphtha and used for illumination purposes during the late 19th and early 20th centuries. Its primary use in the latter half of the 19th century was for illumination of buoys, isolated beacons, lighthouses and railroad cars.

=== Railway carriages ===
Pintsch gas was first applied to the illumination of railway carriages on the Lower Silesian Railway in Germany in 1871. The system was successfully trialled in 1874 on the London and North Western Railway for its Irish Mail service: one eight-cubic-foot (0.23 m^{3}) tank of compressed gas in each carriage would provide for two Euston-to-Holyhead return journeys. Its use was then taken up by many other railway companies in England. By 1888, some 23,500 railway carriages across Europe and the US were lit on Pintsch's system, of which just under 15,000 were in Germany. Lamps using Pintsch gas burned brighter and longer than the oil lamps they replaced and could withstand vibration and rough usage without the light being extinguished.

In several railway accidents, Pintsch gas lamps added fuel to any fire which started, for example in the Thirsk rail crash (1892), the Sunshine rail disaster (1908), the Quintinshill rail disaster (1915), and the Dugald rail accident (1947).

Electricity eventually replaced Pintsch illumination on railroad cars.

=== Navigation lights ===
In 1878, the successful illumination of buoys was first achieved by Pintsch's Patent Lighting Company Ltd using their compressed oil-gas system. The gas became a popular means of illuminating buoys, beacons and unmanned lighthouses, because it allowed the devices to remain lit for several months without servicing. The Clyde Lighthouse Trustees were the first company to adopt the system officially. That was followed by the Suez Canal Company, which installed 59 buoys and 39 beacons lit using Pintch's system, to enable the canal to be navigable by night as well as by day. The buoys held compressed gas sufficient for two months' constant illumination between refills.

In 1884, the Pintsch company demonstrated its system as part of a trial of different lighthouse illuminants conducted on the cliffs by the South Foreland Lighthouses. After the trials, the Corporation of Trinity House purchased the associated gasworks and re-erected it at their Blackwall depot to manufacture Pintsch gas for its own use. In the following year, they established the first of a number of illuminated buoys and unattended beacons on the Thames Estuary using the system. By 1886, over 200 Pintsch gas-lit buoys, beacons, lighthouses and lightships were operational, in North and South America, Australia, and around the coasts of Europe, as well as on the Suez Canal. The automatic apparatus used in Pintsch gas beacons enabled them to be installed in relatively inaccessible locations, or used for 'unwatched' or unattended lights.

Pintsch gas lights continued to be used for navigation into the 20th century, but after the First World War, Pintsch gas began to be superseded by acetylene as the preferred fuel for unattended navigation lights. By the early 1930s, very few buoys or beacons were still being lit by Pintsch gas.

=== Electric light and railway technology ===
Early in the twentieth century, Pintsch AG diversified its interests in lighting to include filaments for electric lighting, to electric lighting systems, and decorative neon lighting; and on the railway side to include level crossing signals and electro-mechanical interlocking systems.
