= Hawes Junction rail crash =

Railway crash in England in 1910

- Photograph of the accident published in The Illustrated London News (31 December 1910)

Details
- Date: 24 December 1910; 05:49
- Location: North of Lunds Viaduct, North Riding of Yorkshire
- Coordinates: 54.3395°N 2.3258°W
- Country: England
- Line: Settle-Carlisle line
- Operator: Midland Railway
- Cause: Signalling error

Statistics
- Trains: 2
- Passengers: 56
- Deaths: 12
- Injured: 17

The Hawes Junction rail crash occurred at 5.49 am on 24 December 1910, just north of Lunds Viaduct between Hawes Junction (now known as Garsdale station) and Aisgill on the Midland Railway's Settle and Carlisle main line in the North Riding of Yorkshire (now Cumbria), England. It was caused when a busy signalman, Alfred Sutton, forgot about a pair of light engines waiting at his down (northbound) starting signal to return to their shed at Carlisle. They were still waiting there when the signalman set the road for the down Scotch express. When the signal cleared, the light engines set off in front of the express into the same block section. Since the light engines were travelling at low speed from a stand at Hawes Junction, and the following express was travelling at high speed, a collision was inevitable. The express caught the light engines just after Moorcock Tunnel near Aisgill summit in Mallerstang and was almost wholly derailed.

Casualties were made worse by the telescoping (over-riding) of the timber-bodied coaches, and by fire which broke out in the coaches, fed by the gas for the coaches' lights leaking from ruptured pipes. Twelve people lost their lives as a result of this accident, some of whom were trapped in the wreckage and were burned to death.

== The accident ==
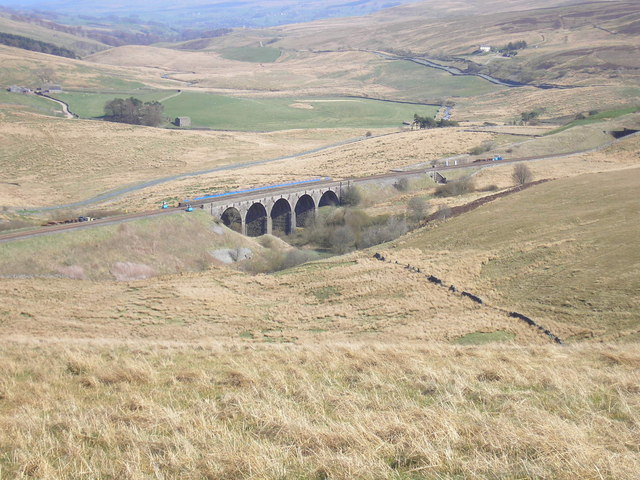
Lunds Viaduct; the accident happened just after the viaduct. Moorcock Tunnel is on the extreme right of the image

Hawes Junction station was approximately 3.5 miles (5.6 km) south of Ais Gill summit, the highest point on the steeply graded Settle and Carlisle line. The Midland Railway, who owned and operated the line, had a policy of using small engines only, and many trains (both northbound and southbound) required assistance from pilot engines to climb the "big hump" to Ais Gill summit. At Ais Gill summit the pilot engines were uncoupled and ran on the up (southbound, towards London) line to Hawes Junction, where there was a turntable accessed from the up main line via a trailing slip or from the back platform line (a loop line alongside the up main line which served the branch line to Hawes). Having been turned, light engines were usually coupled together to return to their depots (usually Leeds to the south or Carlisle to the north).

In the hour preceding the accident, signalman Sutton at Hawes Junction had to deal with nine light engines and a heavy load of scheduled traffic and some unscheduled special trains as part of the holiday traffic. At 5:20 am, the last two northbound light engines (rebuilt Midland Railway Class 2 4-4-0 Nos. 448 and 548, under drivers Edwin Scott and George William Bath) had been turned and coupled together, and were waiting on the "lie-bye" road alongside the down (northbound, away from London) line. After a down special express passed, Sutton signalled them onto the down main line where they halted at the advance starting signal, waiting for the express to clear Aisgill. Normally, this took between four and six minutes. However, Scott and Bath were still waiting twenty minutes later.

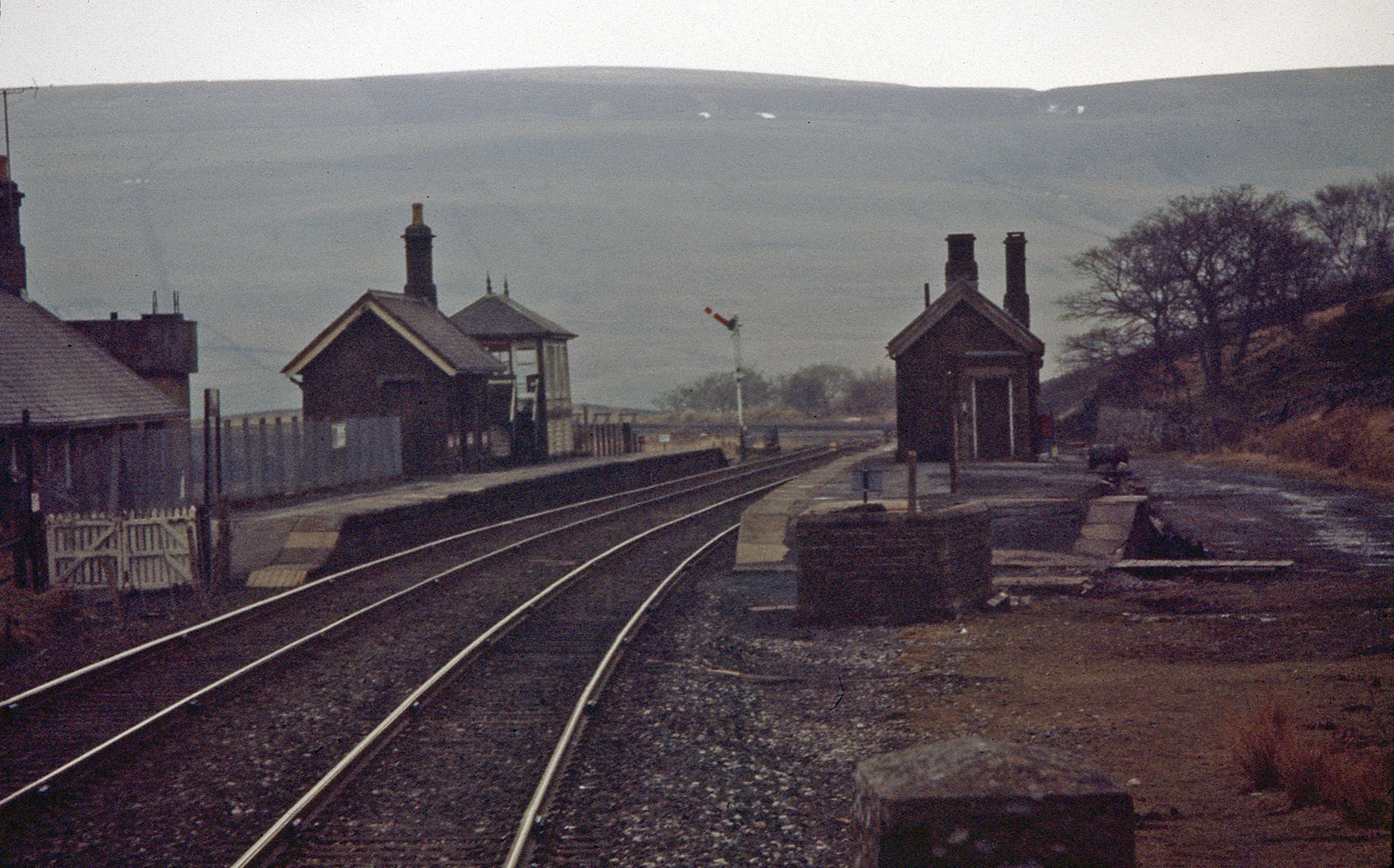
Hawes Junction station, looking north. The signal box is on the down (northbound) platform.

Sutton had been busy handling two express up goods and trying to dispatch three light engines to the south between them. At 5.39, Sutton was offered the midnight sleeping car express, St.Pancras-Glasgow, which he offered forward to Ais Gill. It was accepted at once and at 5:44 he pulled all his signals "off" i.e. set them to clear. Scott and Bath briefly "popped" their whistles and set off. Barely two minutes later the express passed through. It consisted of four timber-bodied coaches, two sleeping cars and two brake vans, hauled by "Kirtley" 2-4-0 No. 48 and rebuilt Class 2 No. 549, under drivers Richard Johnston Oldcorn and Henry Wadeson. It was running sixteen minutes late due to signal and other delays at Leeds and Skipton, but was running at 60 miles per hour (97 km/h) and accelerating before making the final ascent to Ais Gill.

The two light engines were running at only an easy 25 miles per hour (40 km/h). They had cleared Moorcock tunnel just over a mile north of Hawes Junction and were running across the Lunds viaduct 500 yards (460 m) north of the tunnel when driver Bath glanced back and saw the express as it emerged from the tunnel. He opened his regulator and whistle. At the same time, driver Oldcorn on the leading engine of the express saw the red tail light on Bath's tender and applied the express's continuous brake. Driver Oldcorn estimated that the distance between the speeding express and the light engine was only 6 yards (5.5 m), so neither measure had time to take effect, and the express struck the light engines from behind. Bath's locomotive was derailed and lost its front bogie, but his and Scott's locomotives carried on for over 200 yards (180 m) before Bath's locomotive came to rest against the side of a cutting. The two locomotives of the express were also derailed, and the coaches piled up behind them. The first two coaches were badly telescoped, and the twelve passengers who died were in these two coaches.

Except for two electrically lit sleeping cars, the coaches were lit by the Pintsch oil gas system. The main gas pipe on the leading coach was broken off in the impact, and the entire contents of the pressurised gas cylinders escaped in under two minutes. The gas then ignited in a single flash. Driver Bath had been injured in the leg but made his way on foot to the Ais Gill signal box a mile and a half north to summon help. The signalman there, Benjamin Bellas, sent another light engine under driver John William Judd, with Bath, along the up line. Judd attempted to put out the fire by bucketing water from his tender. Another light engine had been sent from Hawes Junction and its crew tried to drag the rear coaches away from the fire but could move only the brake vans at the rear of the train. The six leading coaches were immovable. The engine crews and the express train's guards, the sleeping car attendants, some platelayers from a hut a short distance up the line and a shepherd whose home was nearby tried desperately to rescue the trapped passengers but were eventually driven back by thick smoke. Because a strong wind was fanning the flames, the fire could not be extinguished and all six coaches were burned out.

The bodies of the dead were taken to the nearby Moorcock Inn. The Board of Trade Inquiry into the crash commenced on 27 December 1910 in the same inn.

The writer John Francon Williams and his son John Jr, were thought to have been passengers on the train but were discovered safe two days after the accident having not caught the train in Manchester as they had intended.

== Causes ==
Wrecks of the waggons

The immediate cause of the accident was that signalman Sutton forgot that he had moved the two light engines to the down line, waiting there to proceed to Carlisle. He later improperly cleared the down line signals without ascertaining that the line was clear.

George Tempest, the driver of another light engine waiting at Hawes Junction to return south to Leeds, witnessed Scott's and Bath's engines depart followed closely by the express. After he and his fireman heard the whistle of Bath's locomotive, he went to the signalbox and related what he had seen. Sutton refused to believe him until he had checked his train register, and then telephoned signalman Bellas at Aisgill to ask whether the two light engines had gone through. Bellas replied that none had been offered to him; nor had the St. Pancras-Glasgow express passed. Sutton had apparently been under the mistaken impression that he had dispatched the two light engines to Carlisle some time earlier. By this time, the glare of the fire to the north was visible. Simpson, the signalman sent to relieve Sutton, then arrived for his shift, whereupon Sutton asked him to "go to Bunce [the stationmaster] and tell him I am afraid I have wrecked the Scotch Express".

== Railway Inspectorate Report ==
Since the earliest days of public railways in the UK, railway accidents were investigated by Her Majesty's Railway Inspectorate, an independent body of experts, mostly from the Royal Engineers. In the case of the Hawes Junction collision, the investigating officer was Major John Wallace Pringle, who opened a private court of investigation initially operating from the waiting room at Hawes Junction station. He naturally judged that Sutton's admitted mistake was the primary cause of the accident, but made a number of observations on the conduct of others and several recommendations.

Pringle considered that drivers Scott and Bath were also at fault for failing to carry out the requirements of Rule 55, which was created to remind signalmen in this situation. Under this rule, they should have sounded their engine whistles on coming to a stop, and when the signal was not cleared they should have sent one of their firemen to the signal box to remind the signalman personally. In 1910, the time after which this should be done was not specified, but was generally accepted to be two or three minutes. The engines were actually detained for twenty minutes.

Scott and Bath stated that they had sounded their whistles as they moved off, and this was confirmed by Tempest. Sutton had not been alerted by this, probably because the two locomotives were halted at the advanced starting signal 270 yards (250 m) from the signal box rather than the much closer home signal, driving rain was being blown against the windows of the box, making it hard to hear sounds outside, and other engines were moving around the station and yard at the same time, so that Sutton would not have attached any particular significance to a train whistle from some distance away.

The issue arose of whether the signalman was overworked. The large number of light engine movements would naturally increase the total amount of traffic at Hawes Junction, but Pringle's report specifically rejected the assertion that overwork was a factor. However, between moving the two light engines onto the down line and accepting the express, the signalman had to deal with two up goods trains and several up light engines, movements which would require all his concentration to avoid delay, and make it easy to forget about the down line. The accident also occurred near the end of Sutton's 10-hour shift, which would make a lapse of memory easier.

Many railways had adopted reminder appliances, simple mechanical collars that the signalmen were required to place on signal levers to remind them that trains were stopped at signals, as a back-up to prevent them clearing the signals by mistake. The Midland Railway had not adopted these simple devices.

The accident would have been prevented if track circuits had been installed to detect the presence of a train (or in this case the light engines) on the main lines, and interlocking with the signals would have prevented them being cleared by the signalman. Track circuits had been invented in the 1870s and had proved to be very successful; unfortunately most British railway companies were slow to install them. The high level of traffic movements made Hawes Junction a prime location for the use of reminder appliances. The Board of Trade accident report unequivocally recommended this, and the Midland Railway rapidly complied both here and at 900 other locations on their network.

Since the outbreak of the fire and its intensity was undoubtedly caused by escaping gas from the Pintsch lighting system, the report recommended measures such as automatic shut-off valves and safer placement of cylinders. However, Pringle recommended that electricity be adopted as the universal method for lighting coaches, although he allowed that it would take many years for such a change to take effect fully.

== Similar accidents ==
- Quintinshill rail disaster – also involved a signalman forgetting about a train on the main line.
- 1892 Thirsk rail crash – a bereaved and overtired signalman fell asleep, forgetting about a train waiting at his signals.
- Winwick rail crash – signalman and booking boy forgot about train on main line.

== Printed sources ==
- Barnes, E. G. (February 1971). "Disaster at Hawes Junction". The Railway Magazine. Vol. 117, no. 838. London: IPC. ISSN 0033-8923.
- Earnshaw, Alan (1996). An illustrated History of Trains in Trouble. Atlantic Transport Publishers. ISBN 0-906899-69-9.
- Nock, O.S. (1987). Historic Railway Disasters (4th ed.). Ian Allan Ltd. ISBN 0-7110-1752-2.
- Pringle, J. W. (1911). Railway accidents. Report by Major Pringle, R.E., on the fatal collision that occurred on the 24th December, 1910, between an express passenger train and two light engines near Hawes junction on the Midland Railway. London: House of Commons. OCLC 1205478511.
- Rolt, L. T. C. (1976). Red for Danger. Pan Books. ISBN 0-330-25555-X.
