= Winwick rail crash =

1934 rail accident in Cheshire, England

Coordinates: 53°25′49″N 2°37′13″W

Details
- Date: 28 September 1934; 21:10
- Location: Winwick, Cheshire
- Country: England
- Line: West Coast Main Line
- Cause: Signalling error

Statistics
- Trains: 2
- Deaths: 11
- Injured: 19

The Winwick rail crash took place at Winwick Junction, near Warrington on the London, Midland and Scottish Railway, on 28 September 1934. Two trains collided, resulting in 11 deaths and 19 injured.

== Background ==
Although the signalman on duty was ultimately responsible for the collision, there were several contributing factors. The layout of the section was complex, with four running lines and a junction between the main Warrington-Preston line and the Warrington-Earlestown branch line. Those two lines carried so much traffic that the signalman had a booking lad with him in the signal box, whose function was to keep the train register and use it to remind the signalman of the position of trains within the section at any time.

== Sequence of events ==
Shortly after 9pm a local train from Warrington, destined for Wigan and drawn by 2-4-2 tank engine No. 6632, entered the section. It was due to be turned off onto the Earlestown branch line, but Signalman Bloor at the Winwick Junction signal box was already busy with no fewer than seven other trains, and probably engaged on the telephone to Warrington, discussing a necessary change to the running order to cater for an express freight train carrying perishable goods (fish). The local train therefore came to a halt at the Winwick Junction home signals, and Fireman Hayes left the train to walk to the signal box 172 yards (157 m) away to carry out Rule 55, by which he was to remind the signalman of the train's presence and ensure that it was protected.

Before Hayes could reach the signal box, the signalman at Winwick Quay to the south rang Call attention for an express train from Euston to Blackpool. As the regulations did not permit him to send the Is Line Clear? bell signal until he had received Train Out of Section for the local train, he intended to send the bell signal Shunt engine for following train to pass upon acknowledgment of Call attention, i.e. he expected Bloor to switch the local train temporarily to another running line and halt it while the express passed. However, Bloor forgot that the local train was standing at his signals, and thought that he had failed to clear his block instruments after a preceding train. He gave the reply, Train out of section and cleared his signals.

The booking lad, E. Derbyshire, who was supposed to alert him to the position of the train, failed to do so. He too had been distracted by a telephone call about a weekly timetable change, and on hearing Bloor exclaim "Good Heavens! I haven't given the 2-1 [i.e. the train out of section call] here yet", he assumed that he himself had missed the passage of the local train. Instead of prompting Bloor that the train register entries for the local train were incomplete, which might have alerted Bloor in time to avert the collision, he used guesswork to fill in the register, indicating the local train was out of the section.

When the Winwick Junction home signals cleared, Driver Hope of the local began moving forward slowly to pick up the fireman, but was struck by the express, drawn by LNWR Prince of Wales Class No. 25648, running at high speed. The rearmost coach of the local train was demolished and first two of the express train were badly telescoped. The guard and five passengers in the local train, and three passengers in the express train were killed. Two passengers (it is not known from which train) later died in hospital.

== Aftermath ==
Signalman Bloor readily admitted his responsibility, but the booking lad's assumption about train movement led the Inspecting Officer (Colonel A.C. Trench) to recommend that booking lads should be made more aware that entries other than from personal knowledge should be verified with the signalman. The lack of a telephone at the signal post, or a track circuit which would have alerted the signalman that the track was occupied and prevented him accepting the express, was also a factor. The Inspecting Officer's report recommended that track circuits be installed at the junction.

== 1967 accident ==
Another accident occurred at Winwick Junction in 1967. A passenger DMU collided with a goods train after failing to stop at a semaphore signal which, although "on", had jammed at approximately 17° to the horizontal. There were no fatalities or serious injuries. The official inquiry concluded that routine maintenance of the signal had been inadequate, and the signalman was at fault for not checking that the signal had properly returned to "Danger" when the lever was replaced. A similar accident, with much more serious consequences, occurred at Invergowrie in 1979.

== Similar accidents ==
- Hawes Junction rail crash (1910)
- Quintinshill rail crash (1915)
- Norton Fitzwarren rail crash (1890)

== See also ==
- List of British rail accidents
