= Treadle (railway) =

Railway signalling device

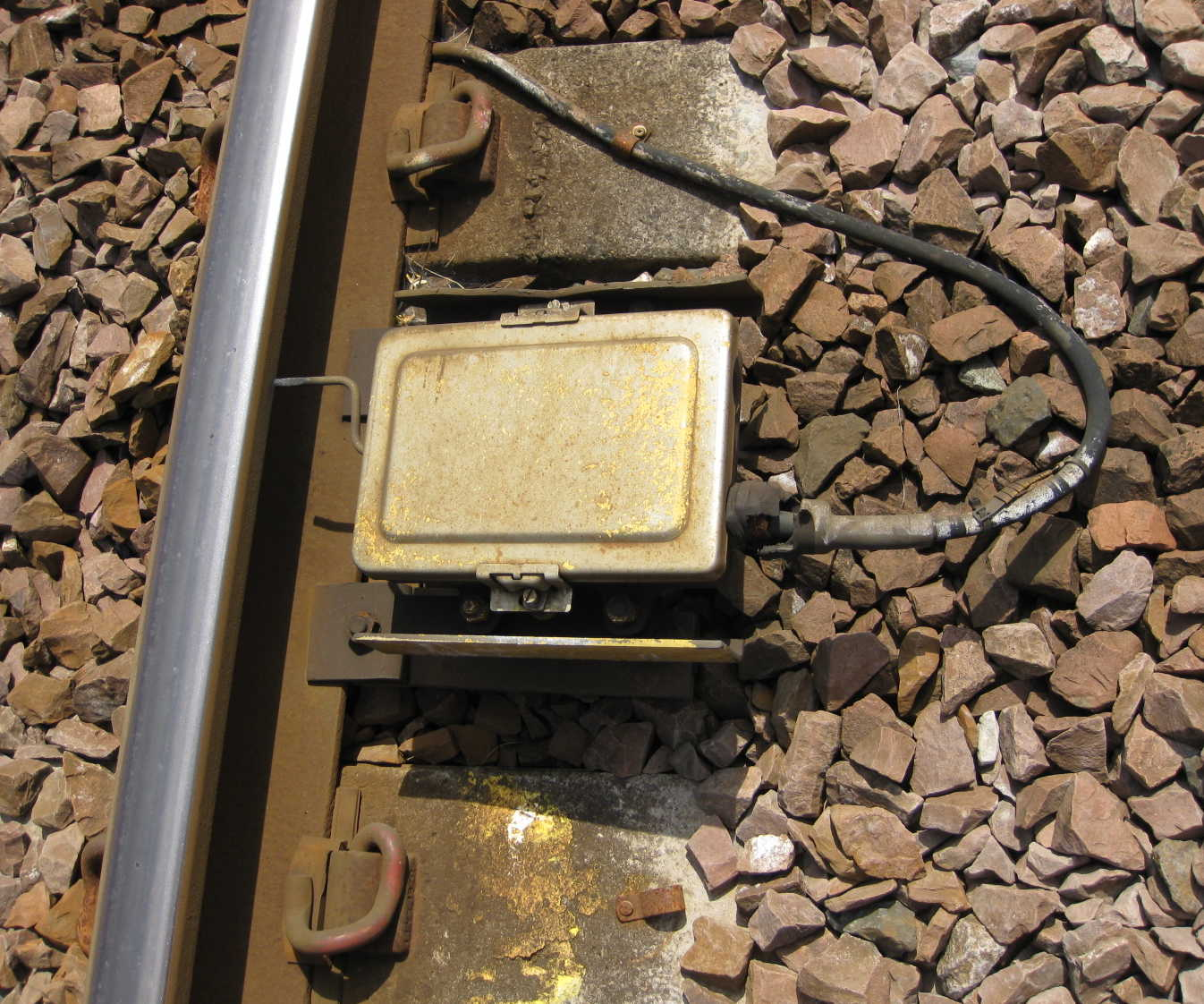
An electro-mechanical treadle

In railway signalling, a treadle is a mechanical or electrical device that detects that a train wheel has passed a particular location. They are used where a track circuit requires reinforcing with additional information about a train's location, such as around an automatic level crossing, or in an annunciator circuit, which sounds a warning that a train has passed an exact point. They also serve as a critical backup in the case of track circuit failure. The important difference between a treadle and a track circuit is that while a track circuit detects a train over a distance as long as several kilometres, a treadle provides detection at a single fixed location.

== Types ==
=== Mechanical ===
In situations where track circuits are unreliable due to rusty rails, for example adjacent to buffer stops and catch points, a long treadle bar is used. When this is depressed, the signaller gains indication (if they have not already done so) of a train in a section.

=== Electro-Mechanical ===
An electro-mechanical treadle retains a small arm that lies across the flangeway of a rail. When it is depressed, an electrical circuit controller within the unit changes its output. It remains depressed for a period of several seconds, so that a train with many axles does not unduly damage the unit.

=== Electronic ===
An electronic treadle uses the disruption of an electromagnetic field to detect an axle, rather than a depression bar. Hence, it can count individual axles. Electronic count heads are used in axle counter circuits that can replace track circuits completely.

== Variations ==
Variations on a treadle that can be one carriage long include facing point lock bars, clearance bars, and train bars, depending how they are located on a track layout.

== Reverser ==
A mechanical treadle that puts a signal to 'stop' can be replaced by a short track circuit and a reverser. A reverser is an electrically engaged latch that allows the signal to be reversed, i.e. placed to green. When the track circuit past the signal is occupied, power to the latch is removed, and the signal reverts to 'stop', red.

Reversers have been used in New South Wales especially to put starting signals to danger. When the signal was put back to stop, the system automatically sent the train on line bell signal (two bells) to the station in advance. This equipment would have helped prevent the Hawes Junction rail crash.

== Level crossing ==
Treadles are commonly used to operate fully automatic level crossings since they give far more reliable and accurate detection of a train than track circuits alone, which is important when there is only just over 30 seconds between the train "striking in" (passing the treadle which starts the crossing sequence) and passing the crossing.

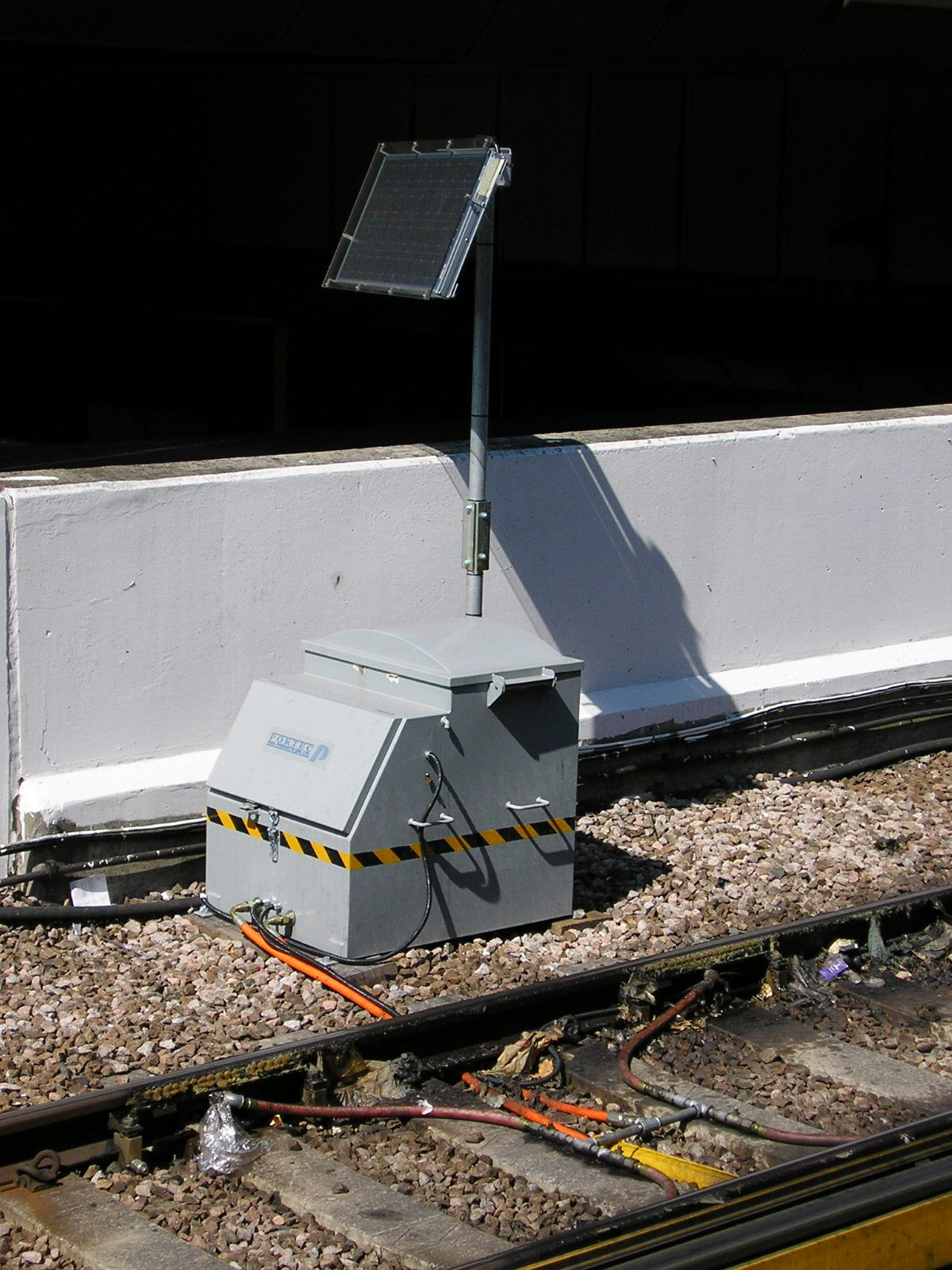
A small treadle operates this flangeway greaser.

== Greasers ==
Greasers use a small treadle to apply a small quantity of grease to the inside edge of the rail to reduce friction and noise between the flange of the wheel and the rail.

== Accident ==
One early signal was the "Automatic" signal invented by CF Whitworth. Far from being "automatic" in operation, this was merely a signal that was operated by the signalman but returned to 'danger' once the train had passed, by means of a treadle. There was one of these at each end of Clayton Tunnel, just north of Brighton, and it was the failure of the signal to return to danger during a busy period that led to the worst accident on that railway, the Clayton Tunnel rail crash. Because the signal had failed to return to stop with another train approaching close behind, the signalman was forced to wave a red flag at the oncoming train without knowing if the train would see this. After wrongly assuming the train had then left the tunnel, the signalman allowed a further train to enter the tunnel, where it collided with the first which had started reversing.

The biggest flaw in the Whitworth automatic signal is probably that it had no redundancy, and a single stone might jam it. On the other hand, without a treadle, the signalman is more likely to get distracted and forget to put the signal to stop.

== See also ==
- Track circuit interrupter
- Terminology in other Languages
- Induction loop used mainly for road and tram use.
