= Henry Wynne =

Henry Wynne may refer to:

- Henry Wynne (runner) (born 1995), American runner
- Henry Wynne (solicitor) (1867–1943), Irish solicitor
- Henry John Wynne (1864–1950), railways signal engineer
