= Severn Tunnel rail accident =

1991 train wreck in the United Kingdom

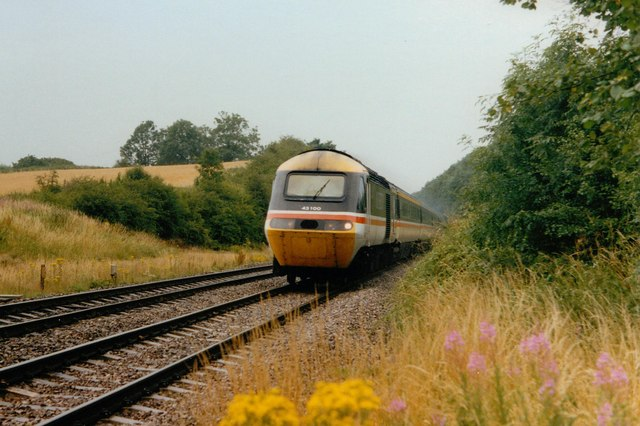
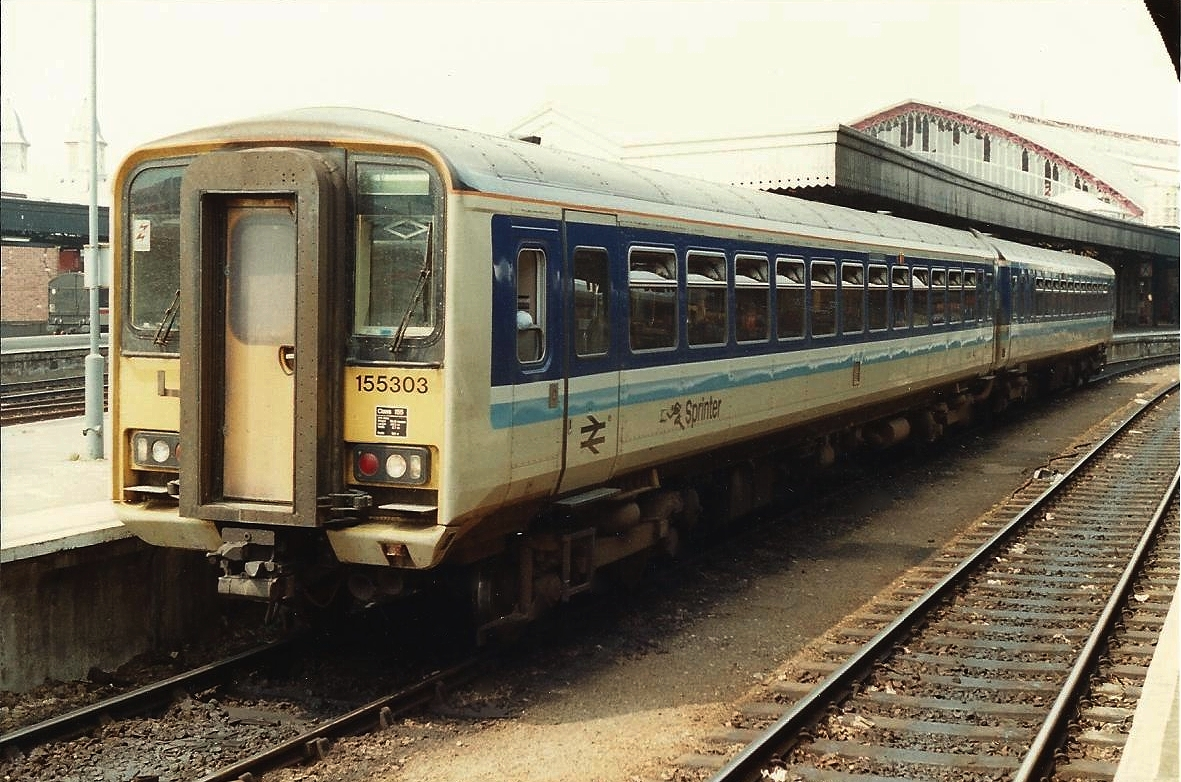
- An InterCity 125 (top) and a Class 155 Sprinter (bottom), similar to those involved in the crash

Details
- Date: 7 December 1991
- Location: Severn Tunnel
- Coordinates: 51°35′7″N 2°43′17″W
- Country: United Kingdom
- Line: South Wales Main Line
- Operator: InterCity; Regional Railways
- Owner: British Rail
- Cause: Unknown, either axle counter failure or driver error

Statistics
- Trains: 2
- Deaths: 0
- Injured: 185 (5 serious)

The Severn Tunnel rail accident was a railway accident that occurred on 7 December 1991 when a Regional Railways-operated Sprinter train collided with an InterCity 125 in the Severn Tunnel. There were no fatalities, but 185 people were injured.

== Background ==
The Severn Tunnel is a 4.35 miles (7 km)-long railway tunnel constructed between 1873 and 1886 to take the South Wales Main Line under the estuary of the River Severn. Due to water ingress, the tunnel has a pumping station which extracts 10 to 20 million imperial gallons (45 to 90 million litres) of water daily. Track circuits were found to be unreliable in the wet conditions, and were replaced by axle counters in 1987. Track circuits operate by sending an electric current through the rails in a given signalling section. Trains interrupt this current, which the circuits interpret as the section being occupied. Water can also interrupt the circuit, which can lead to the detection of trains where none are present. Axle counters work by counting the axles of a passing train at the entry and exit of a signalling section. If the number of axles is the same at both locations, then the train is considered to have completely left the section.

The tunnel is fitted with emergency signals in each direction, which remain unlit during normal operations but turn red when activated. A tell-tale wire runs along the tunnel walls, which when broken, activates the emergency signals and triggers an alarm in the signal box.

The Class 155 Sprinter train was operating 1F08, the Regional Railways 07:00 service from Portsmouth Harbour to Cardiff, with 170 occupants onboard. The InterCity 125 was operating 1B10, the 08:30 service from London Paddington to Cardiff Central, with 132 occupants onboard.

== Accident ==
A signal failure began at around 14:00 on 6 December 1991. This meant that when the section was clear, the signaller had to manually instruct drivers to pass a signal at the tunnel entrance at danger. At around 10:20 on 7 December, the InterCity 125 approached the tunnel and stopped at the danger signal. After contacting the signaller, the train was allowed to pass the signal at danger.

Three miles (5 km) into the tunnel, the train was struck from behind by the Sprinter. The InterCity 125's brakes applied automatically and brought the train to a stand. The driver then exited the cab, broke the tell-tale wire and called the signal box using one of the tunnel's telephones. The rear power car of the InterCity 125 had become decoupled, but both it and the rest of the train did not derail. The driver of the Sprinter was badly injured, and many of the passengers onboard had injured themselves on the seats in front of them.

Two emergency trains, one from the Welsh side and the other from the English side, arrived at the accident site at least two hours after the initial impact. The more seriously injured people were removed at this time. It was at least three hours before the remaining passengers of the Sprinter were moved to the InterCity 125, which the driver then drove out of the tunnel towards Severn Tunnel Junction at 5 mph (8 km/h). At the tunnel entrance, some injured were transferred to hospital by ambulance, with others being given first aid by doctors. It took six hours from the time of the collision to when the uninjured passengers were able to leave. In total, 185 were injured, including five seriously, but none fatally. The tunnel was reopened less than 48 hours after the crash.

== Investigation ==
The HM Railway Inspectorate under the Health and Safety Executive carried out an investigation into the accident. The report was published in 1994, and was conducted with the assistance of the emergency services.

The report could not reach a firm conclusion, but speculated that the cause was either:

- an unaccountable error on the part of the Sprinter driver, or:
- technicians in the relay room at Severn Tunnel Junction had reset the axle counter while investigating the earlier signal failure fault, thus clearing the signal for the Sprinter.
