= Axle counter =

System used in railway signalling

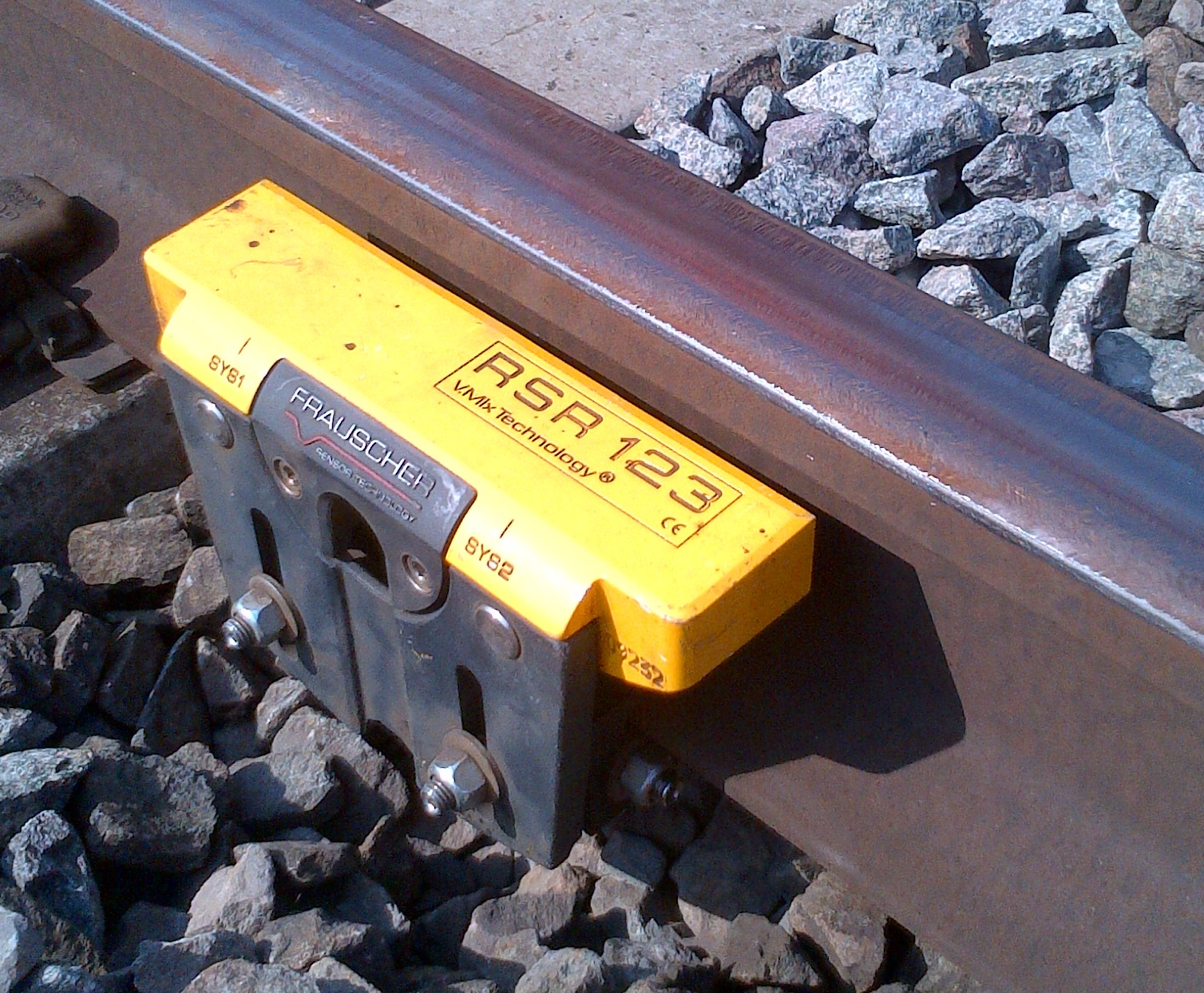
An axle counter detection point in the UK

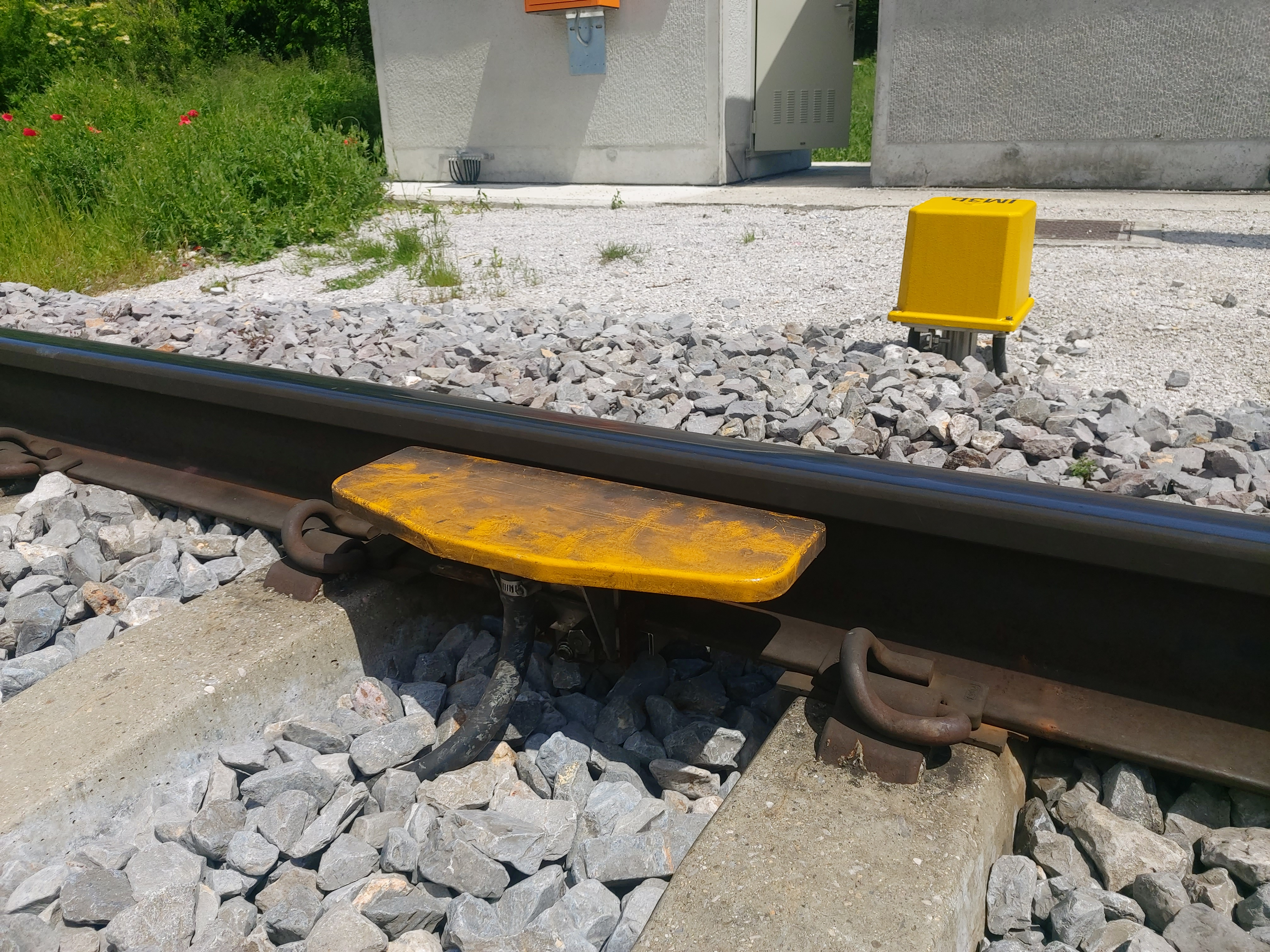
Axle counter for automatic railway crossing (Slovenia)

An axle counter is a system used in railway signalling to detect the clear or occupied status of a specified section of track. The system generally consists of a wheel sensor (one for each end of the section) and an evaluation unit for counting the axles of the train both into and out of the section. They are often used to replace a track circuit.

== Principles and operation ==
An axle counter consists of a sensor, which detects the individual axles of a train by mechanical, electrical or even fibre optic method, and an evaluator which counts the axles passing into and out of a rail section. The evaluator may also convert the analogue signal of the axle sensor into a digital signal. However, in some cases there is a separate unit which performs this task.

The system is set up by having an axle counter sensor installed at each end of a section. As each train axle passes the axle counter sensor at the start of the section, a counter increments. An axle counter sensor comprises two independent sensors (so the device can detect the direction and speed of a train by the order and time in which the sensors are passed). As the train passes a similar axle counter sensor at the end of the section, the system compares count at the end of the section with that recorded at the beginning. If the two counts are the same, the section is presumed to be clear.

This process is carried out by safety-critical centrally located computers, called "evaluators", with the axle counter sensors located at the required sites in the field. The axle counter sensors are either connected to the evaluator via dedicated copper cable or via a telecommunications transmission system. That allows the axle counter sensors to be located a significant distance from the evaluator, and is useful when using centralised interlocking equipment, but less so when signalling equipment is situated beside the line in equipment cabinets.

== Applications ==
=== Track vacancy detection ===
==== Railway signalling ====
The most common use for axle counters is in railway signalling for track vacancy detection. It is a form of block signalling, which does not permit two trains to be within the same section of track (block) at the same time. Block signalling decreases the chance of collision, because dividing the track into blocks ensures there is always enough space between trains to allow one to stop before it hits one in front.

==== Railway crossings ====
Axle counters are also used to switch on and switch off warning equipment at level crossings, closing the crossing to pedestrian and motor vehicles when the presence of a train is detected, and allowing them to open when the train has passed over the crossing.

==== Switch protection in rail yards ====
Axle counters are used in rail yards to detect train cars as they are sorted. Axle counters are placed on the track before each switch and on each track that exits the switch. Rail yard management software uses occupancy data from the axle counters to lock switches and prevent cars from being routed to tracks that are occupied by other cars.

== Advantages ==
Unlike traditional track circuits, axle counters do not require insulated rail joints to be installed. This avoids breaking the continuity of long sections of welded rail to allow insulated joints to be inserted.

=== Electrified Railways ===
Axle counters are particularly useful on electrified railways as they eliminate the need for traction bonding and impedance bonds. Axle counters require no bonding and less cabling in comparison to track circuits, and are therefore generally less expensive to install and maintain.

=== Insulated Rail Joints ===
Axle counters eliminate most railjoints (IRJ) which are a weak point on the track.

=== Railhead Contamination ===
Axle counters do not suffer problems with railhead contamination due to rust, grease or compacted leaf residue. Sometimes a train puts down anti-slip sand to aid deceleration while braking, but the sand contaminates the rail and the track circuit stops working. Axle counters are immune to those problems because they do not rely on the contact of wheel with the rail head to provide an electrical circuit.

=== Better Performance in Wet Conditions ===
Axle counters are used in wet tunnels (such as the Severn Tunnel), where ordinary track circuits are unreliable. Axle counters are also useful on steel structures (such as the Forth Bridge), which may prevent the normal operation of track circuits if insulating the rails from the structure proves impracticable. Axle counters are also useful on long sections where the need for several intermediate track circuits may be saved. An axle counter can go up to around 10,000 metres (33,000 ft) from the evaluation unit when connected directly. However, with the addition of an Ethernet network, the distance is limited by the transmission system.

== Disadvantages ==
For various reasons, such as a power failure, axle counters may 'forget' how many axles are in a section. A manual override is therefore necessary to reset the system. This manual override introduces the human element which may be unreliable. An accident which occurred in the Severn Tunnel is thought to have been due to the improper restoration of an axle counter. That was not proven during the subsequent inquiry, however. In older installations, the evaluators may use 8-bit logic, causing numeric overflow when a train with 256 or more axles passes the axle counter. As a result, that trains with exactly 256 axles would be counted as having zero and would not be detected; a train with 257 axles would be counted as having one, so on and so forth. That imposes a restriction against multiples of 256 on axle count - with operators typically adding additional empty wagons to avoid the exact number. More modern systems are not restricted by train wheel numbers.

=== Turnouts ===
Where there are interlocked turnouts, an axle counter unit needs to be provided for each leg of that turnout. On lines with non-interlocked/hand-operated switches, detection of the switch points would have to be monitored separately, whereas on track-circuited lines misaligned points can be set to automatically break the track circuit.

=== Broken rails ===
A track circuit system does facilitate the detection of many, but not all, kinds of broken rails, though only to a limited extent in AC traction areas, and not in the common rail in DC traction areas. By contrast, axle counters cannot detect broken rails at all. Ordinary track circuits do have a blind spot of about a metre in length from the wiring connections to the insulated rail joint (IRJ).

=== Siding and shunting movements ===
Axle counters have problems maintaining correct counts when train wheels stop directly on the counter mechanism. That is known as 'wheel rock', and can prove problematic at stations or other areas where cars are shunted, joined and divided. Also, where main lines have switches to siding, spur or loop tracks, extra counters will need to be deployed to detect trains entering or exiting the line, whereas the same infrastructure using track circuits needs no special attention.

In Auckland, New Zealand, axle counters have been used on all lines where track circuits are required, except for special places where Hi Rail maintenance vehicles either on or off track. All road crossing tracks at public level crossings are deemed to be Hi Rail access points and a short single rail DC track circuit is used. There are also several single rail DC track circuits at places not at level crossings where Hi Rail vehicles can access the track.

=== Electromagnetic brakes ===
Magnetic brakes are used on high speed / higher speed trains with a maximum speed greater than 160 kilometres per hour (100 mph). These are physically large pieces of metal mounted on the bogie of the vehicle, only a few centimetres above the track. They can sometimes be mistakenly detected by axle counters as another axle. This can happen at only one end of a track block, because of magnetic field curvature, defects of track geometry, or other issues, leading the signalling system to become confused, and also requiring reset of the detection memory. Modern axle counters are 'eddy current' brake-proof and the magnetic effect of the braking system as described above is overcome, with count information remaining stable even when a vehicle fitted with magnetic brakes is braking whilst traversing the detection point.

== Installation ==
One method of mounting an axle counter sensor is to drill through the rail, however this is often seen as time-consuming, as well as having the disadvantage of weakening the structure of the rail. However. it does eliminate the need for levelling, which can help reduce maintenance costs.

Another installation method is to mount the Axle Counter Sensor onto a mount which clamps to both sides of the rail from underneath. That is quicker and easier to mount in the right conditions, but can mean more frequent checks to ensure correct positioning is maintained.

== Reset and restoration ==
There are four methods of securing the reset and restoration of axle counters into service:

- Preparatory reset — Once a preparatory reset is applied to the system, the axle counter continues to show the section as occupied until one train movement takes place in the section. Logically, if a train has successfully traversed the section, then the section is clear and the axle counter is set back to unoccupied.
- Conditional reset — The section is reset only if the last count was in the outward direction. This at least shows that any trains in the section at time of reset were moving out. The signal protecting the reset section is held at occupied until a sweep or physical verification of clearance of the track.
- Un-conditional reset — The section is reset irrespective of the last count action. The protecting signals are cleared immediately after a reset. In the UK, this type of reset is used under "Engineer's Possession Reminder" (EPR) and a series of procedures are carried out to ensure the section of line is clear of vehicles and tools before the reset is performed.
- Co-operative reset — Requires both the technician and signaller to co-operate to reset and then restore the section into service. This type of reset is now only used on schemes which fringe on an existing scheme which utilizes this type of reset arrangement.

Most countries use a variation of the above four methods, sometimes with varying amounts of automation or human input.

== History ==
Axle counting initially started with treadle-like mechanisms. They consisted of a mechanical contact device mounted on the inside of the foot of rail; the wheel flange running over the device actuated a lever. However, they were susceptible to errors and were replaced in Europe at the end of the 19th century by hydraulic rail contacts.

Hydraulic rail contacts were actuated by the deflection of the rail caused by axle load running over the tracks. The first cylinders were filled with mercury; later, hydraulic oil was used. They were then replaced by pneumatically operated switching elements.

In pneumatic axle counting systems, pistons were actuated by specific loads and speeds. They proved limited in application, and therefore from the 1950s onwards were replaced by magnetic contacts. Up to that point, track circuits always had a big edge when it came to reliability.

Magnetic contacts were the first contactless switching devices. They were known as "axle counting magnets". The iron wheel flanges triggered an actuation by interrupting a magnetic field. The first US patent for an axle counter, filed on 3 June 1960 by Ernst Hofstetter and Kurt Haas, was for a device of this type. During this time, inductive methods were also being produced based on transformers. During the 1970s, developments in the electronics field as well as the introduction of integrated circuits allowed the design of the axle counters currently used.

== See also ==
- Defect detector
- Lists of rail accidents
- Severn Tunnel rail accident (1991)
- Rail inspection
- Railway signalling
- Track circuit
- Distributed Acoustic Sensing
