= Track circuit =

Electrical device used to detect the presence of trains on rail tracks

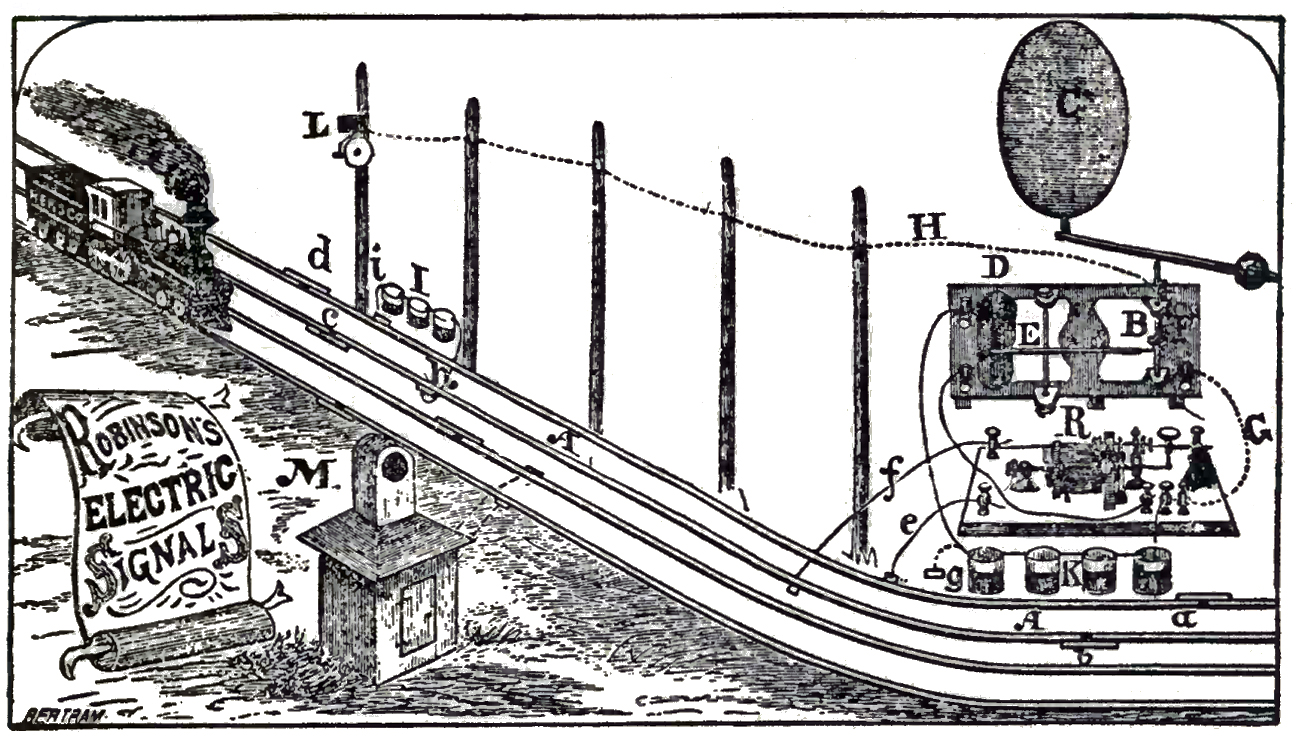
Illustration of track circuit invented by William Robinson in 1872

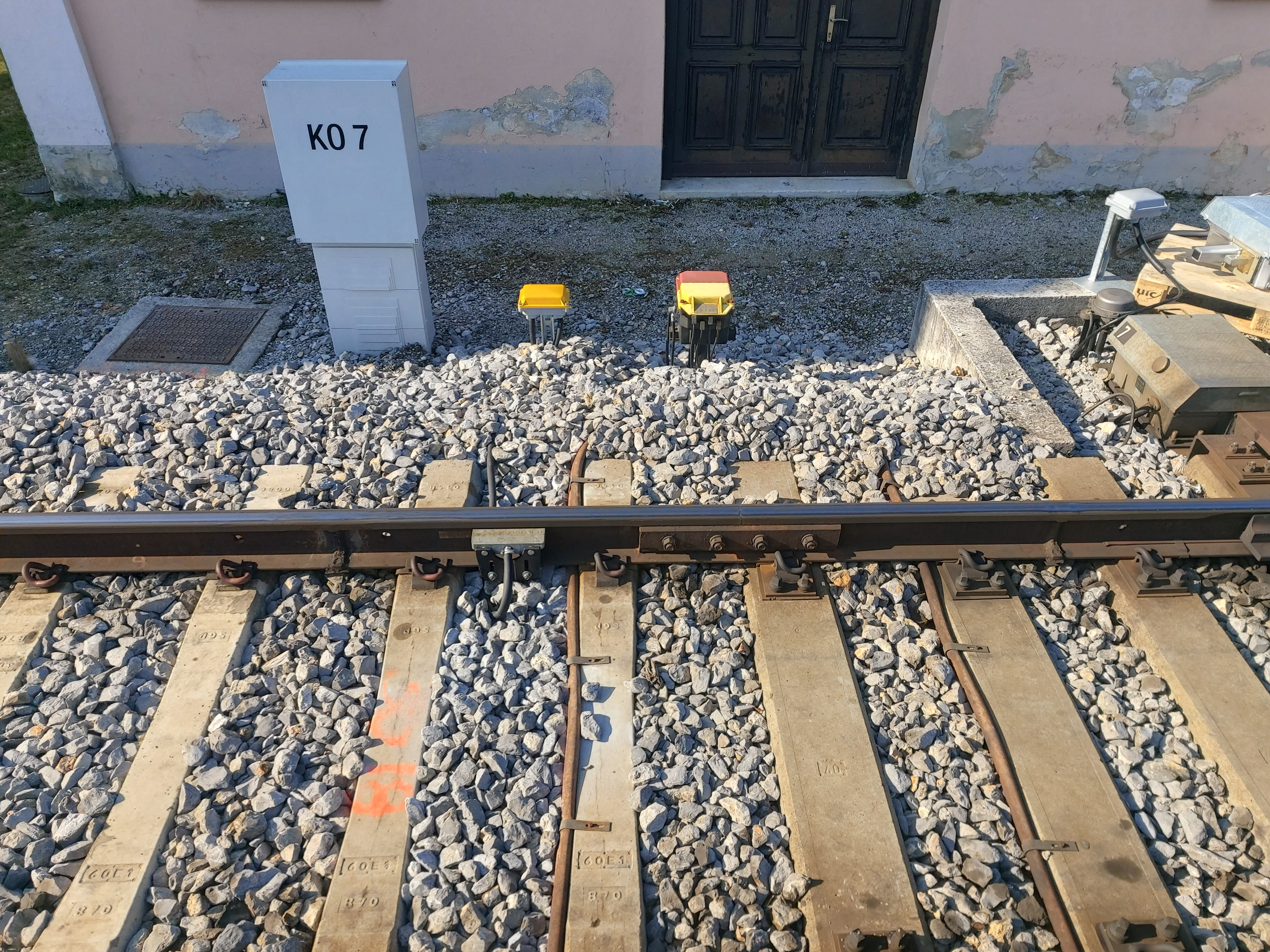
Track circuit transformer on the right, new axle counter on the left (Slovenia).

A track circuit is an electrical device used to prove the absence of a train on a block of rail tracks to control railway signals. An alternative to track circuits are axle counters.

== Principles and operation ==
The basic principle behind the track circuit lies in the connection of the two rails by the wheels and axle of locomotives and rolling stock to short an electrical circuit. This circuit is monitored by electrical equipment to detect the absence of the trains. Since this is a safety appliance, fail-safe operation is crucial. Hence, the circuit is designed to indicate the presence of a train when failures occur. On the other hand, false occupancy readings are disruptive to railway operations and must be minimized.

Track circuits allow railway signalling systems to operate semi-automatically, by displaying signals for trains to slow or stop in the presence of occupied track ahead of them. They help prevent dispatchers and operators from causing accidents, both by informing them of track occupancy and by preventing signals from displaying unsafe indications.

=== Basic circuit ===
Schematic drawing of track circuit for unoccupied block (series resistor next to battery not shown)

Schematic drawing of occupied track circuit (series resistor next to battery not shown)

A track circuit typically has power applied to each rail and a relay coil wired across them. When no train is present, the relay is energised by the current flowing from the power source through the rails. When a train is present, its axles short (shunt) the rails together. The current to the track relay coil drops, and it is de-energised. Circuits through the relay contacts therefore report whether or not the track is occupied.

Each circuit detects a defined section of track, such as a block. These sections are separated by insulated joints, usually in both rails. To prevent one circuit from falsely powering another in the event of insulation failure, the electrical polarity is usually reversed from one section to an adjacent section. Circuits are powered at low voltages (1.5 to 12 V DC). The relays and the power supply are attached to opposite ends of the section to prevent broken rails from electrically isolating part of the track from the circuit. A series resistor limits the current when the track circuit is short-circuited.

=== Circuits under electrification ===
In some railway electrification schemes, one or both of the running rails are used to carry the return traction current. This precludes use of a basic direct current (DC) track circuit because the substantial traction currents overwhelm the very small track circuit currents. DC can also not be used on track circuits for unelectrified tracks near DC electrified tracks. Moreover, track circuits on tracks that are electrified with alternating current (AC) cannot use current that oscillates at multiples of the traction power frequency to avoid harmonics.

Consequently, track circuits typically use AC in the range of audio frequencies, from 91 Hz up to 10 kHz. The relays are arranged to detect the selected frequency and to ignore DC and AC traction frequency signals. Fail-safe principles dictate that the system interpret the presence of the signal as unoccupied track and a lack of a signal as the presence of a train. The AC signal can be coded and locomotives equipped with inductive pickups to create a cab signalling system.

There are two common approaches to provide a continuous path for traction current that spans multiple track circuit blocks. The simplest method installs insulated track circuit joints on only one of the two rails with the second being a path for the return current and a ground for the track circuit rail. This has the disadvantage of only being able to detect breaks in one rail so the more popular two rail system uses impedance bonds to permit traction current to pass between isolated track circuit blocks while blocking current at track circuit frequencies.

AC circuits are sometimes used in areas where conditions introduce stray currents, which interfere with DC track circuits.

=== Jointless track circuits ===
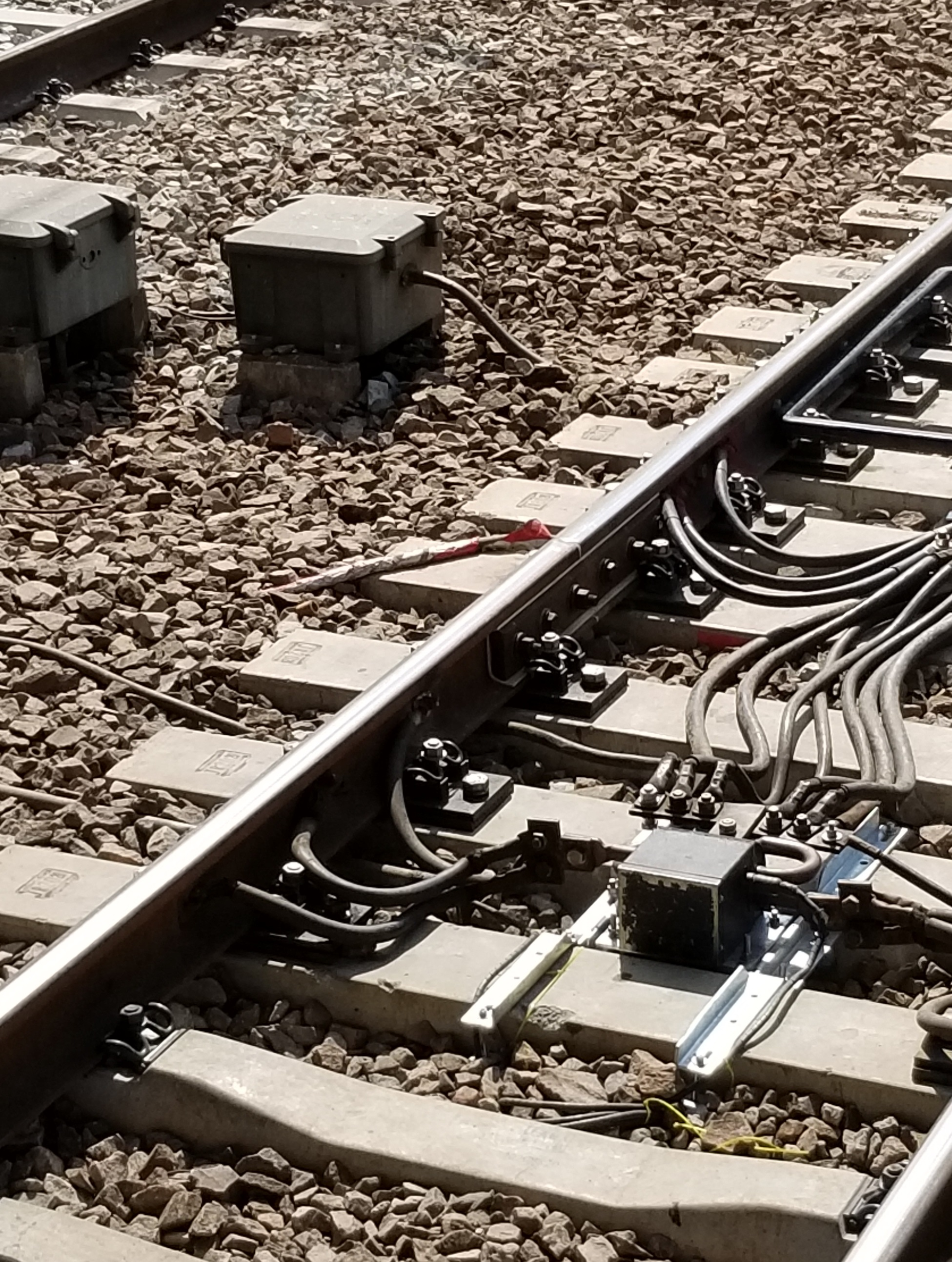
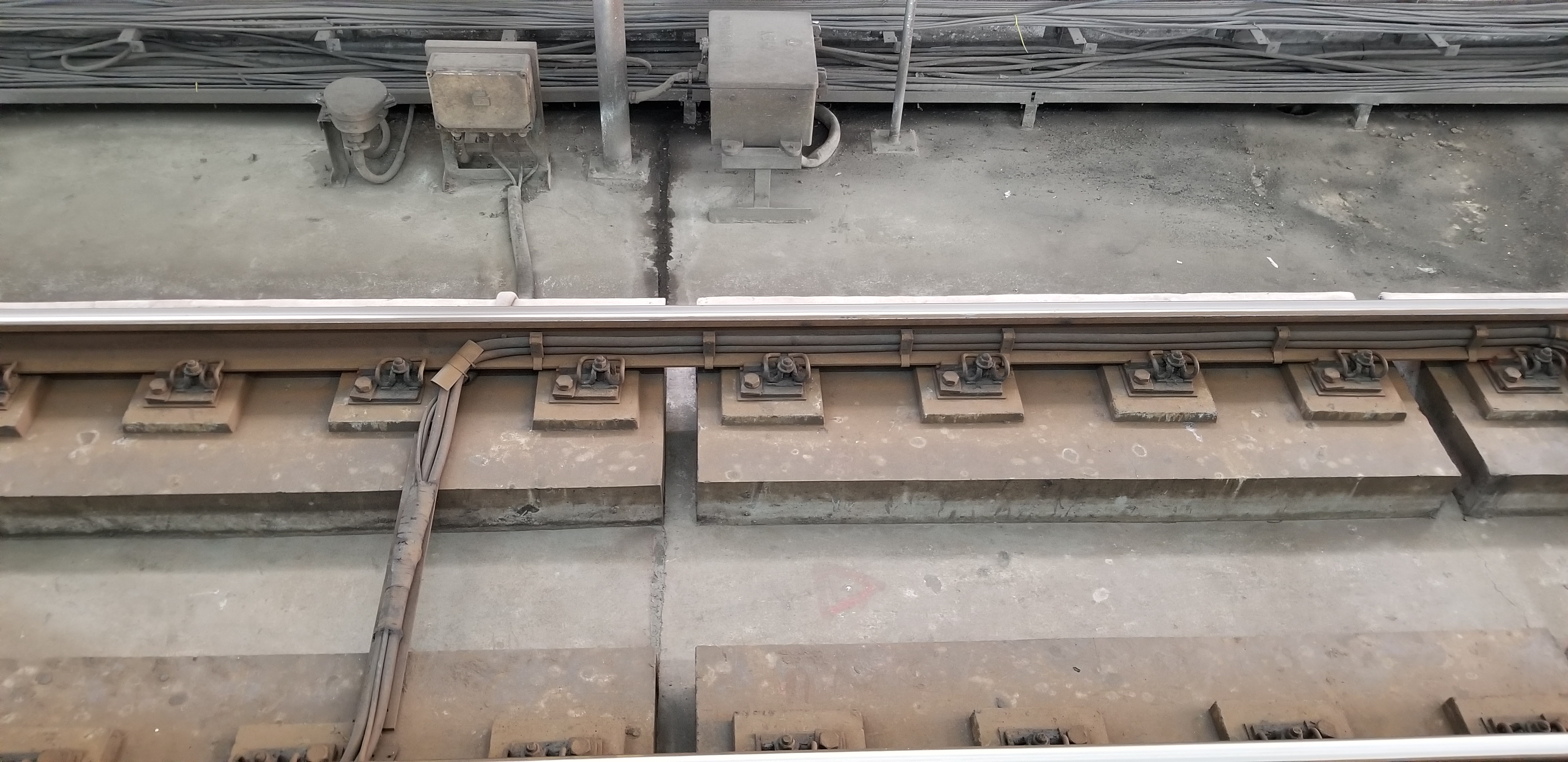
Electric "joints" of jointless track circuits on Shanghai Metro. Left: Wee-Z Bond of a GRS audio frequency track circuit; Right: S-Bond of an Alstom Digicode track circuit

Modern track is often continuously welded, the joints being welded during installation. This offers many benefits, except to the signalling system, which no longer has natural breaks in the rail to form block sections. The only method to form discrete blocks in this scenario is to use different audio frequencies (AF) in each block section. To prevent the audio signal from one section passing into an adjacent section, pairs of tuned circuits are connected across the rails at the section boundary. The tuned circuit often incorporates the circuit to either apply the transmitted signal to the track or recover the received signal from the other end of the section.

Consider a railway with two block sections as in the diagram. Section 1 has frequency A injected at the left-hand end and received at the right-hand end. Section 2 continues from the right hand end of section 1 where frequency B is injected and then received at the right-hand end of section 2.

Track circuited railway with two block sections

There is often a gap between where frequency A is received and frequency B is injected. This is referred to as a 'tuned zone' and is a section of track where the amplitude of frequency A reduces in the direction of section 2 and the amplitude of frequency B reduces in the direction of section 1. The tuned zone can be of the order of 20 m long.

Advantages of jointless track circuits:

- Eliminates insulated block joints, a component liable to mechanical failure (both of insulation and by introducing stress to adjoining rails) and maintenance.
- In electrified areas, jointless track circuits require fewer impedance bonds than any other double rail traction return track circuits.

Disadvantages of jointless track circuits:

- Restrictions on placing impedance bonds, hence any connection for electrification purposes, in or near tuned zones as this may upset the filter properties of the tuned zone.
- Electronic circuits are more vulnerable to lightning strikes.

=== CSEE UM71 ===
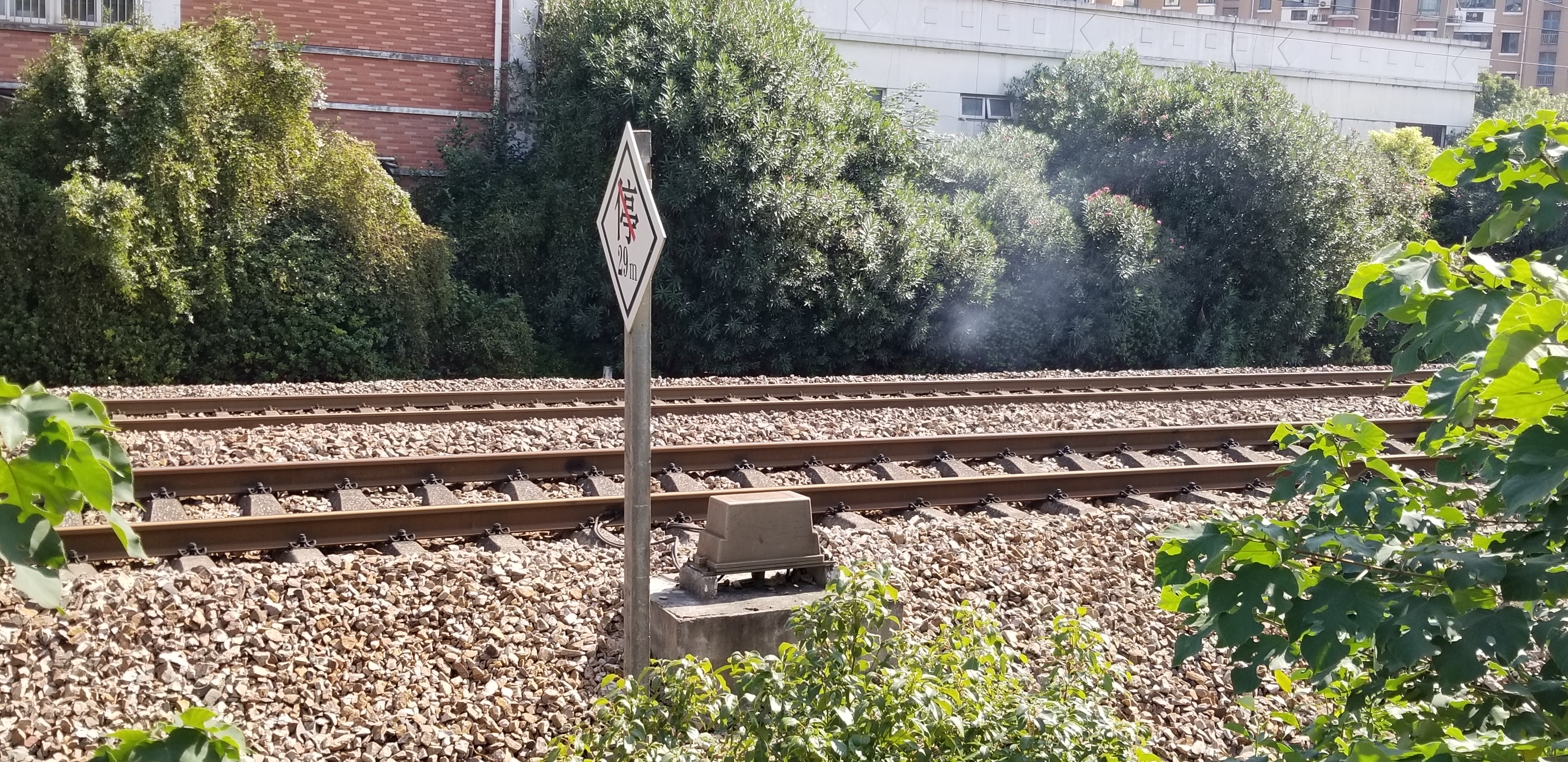
Tuning unit of a ZPW-2000 (Chinese variant of UW71) track circuit and a sign indicating "do not stop at circuit boundary", where loss-of-shunt may occur.

CSEE (now part of MERMEC) UM71 is another kind of jointless track circuit. It uses 1700 Hz and 2300 Hz on one track and 2000 Hz and 2600 Hz on the other. To reduce the chance of stray currents causing a wrong side failure the modulation frequency is calculated by dividing the base frequency by 128. Different rates of modulation can be detected by equipment on the trains and used for automatic train control, so long as the transmitter end (Tx) is at the front of the train.

The EBItrack (formerly TI21) and Westinghouse FS2500 jointless track circuits are similar to the UM71.

==== Data pickup unit ====
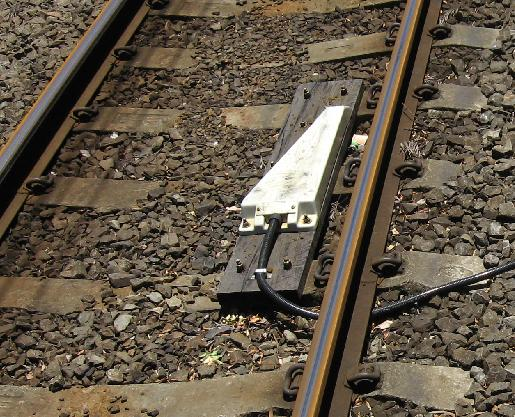
Data pickup unit CSEE; end view

A jointless track circuit such as the CSEE can be divided with a data pickup unit (DPU), which is cheaper than splitting it into two track circuits. A DPU avoids the need to change the frequency of a whole series of track circuits in a cascade. The DPU consists of a tuned coil which detects the presence or absence of current in the adjacent rail and picks up or drops a relay accordingly. One use of DPUs is for timing circuits. Each track circuit frequency has its own DPU tuned to that frequency. DPUs can be located almost anywhere; they overcome the limitation that jointless tracks have a minimum length.

=== DC coded track circuits ===
In non-electrified areas, DC coded track circuits may be used. These modulate the current going from the powersource end to the relay end and control the signals and cab signals without the need for line wires. The modulated currents can be detected by equipment connected to the track to provide signaling and indication information to activate proper cab signalling if available. They can be overlain by predictor systems to operate level crossings.

Brands of coded track circuit include:

- Alstom née GE Electrocode 5
- Microtrax/E-Code by Hitachi née Union Switch & Signal

=== Cut tracks ===
Where the length of a section exceeds the practical length of a track circuit, cut tracks can be provided. With a cut track, the relay of the last track cuts the powersource feed of the second last track circuit, and so on. Cut tracks are only suitable for unidirectional tracks.

Track circuits with ballast contamination will be shorter than those with good ballast, thus needing more cut tracks.

=== High-voltage tracks ===
One common brand of high-voltage impulse track (HVIT) circuit is made by Jeumont-Schneider. The high voltage penetrates rust and other problems.

The HVIT transmits two pulses alternately, a narrow positive one at about 100 V DC and a negative broader one at about 30 V DC. The energy of the two pulses is the same. At the receiver end an R-C circuit integrates the two pulses, which must be of the correct proportions for the relay to pick up. The R-C circuits check that the positive and negative pulses are in correct phase. The two pulses operate at about 1 Hz.

The circuit operates on AC and DC electrified lines, with additional equipment.

=== Single rail and double rail ===
In non-electrified areas, insulated blockjoints come in pairs, one on each rail.

In electrified areas, a workaround is needed to allow the traction current, of the order of thousands of amperes, to return to the substation. This may be achieved by having no insulated block joints in one of the rails, called the return rail.

If both rails are needed to carry the heavy traction return current, then insulated blockjoints are provided in both rails, and impedance bonds are provided to carry the traction current around the insulated joints. Impedance bonds are essentially centre-tapped coils, which offer low impedance to traction current at say 50 Hz, while offering high impedance to signalling current at say 1.7 kHz.

== Failure modes and prevention ==
=== Wheels and brakes ===
Railway wheels are made from steel and provide a good short circuit from rail to rail (shunt resistance).

Longer trains with more wheels have better conductivity. Short trains, light railmotors or single engines can be a problem. In New Zealand there were problems with light Rm class railmotors not always being detected. Trains with a single Budd railmotor, which are also lightweight, and with discbrakes, had some problems when they stopped, and had to make a double stop to ensure good contact with the rails.

Cast iron brake shoes tend to clean the wheels of non-conductive debris (such as leaves and sand-based traction compounds), while disc brakes do not. As a result, some disc-braked vehicles have "scrubber pads" cleaning the wheels to aid in proper track circuit operation.

=== Relays ===
Track circuit relays, referred to by signal maintainers as "vital relays," are specially designed to reduce the chance of wrong-side failures. They may, for example, have carbon-silver contacts to reduce the likelihood of the wrong contacts welding shut after power surges and lightning strikes.

=== Circuit failures ===
The circuit is designed so the vast majority of failures will cause a "track occupied" indication (known as a right-side failure). Examples include:

- A broken rail or wire will break the circuit between the power supply and the relay, de-energizing the relay. See exception below.
- A failure in the power supply will de-energize the relay.
- A short across the rails or between adjacent track sections will de-energize the relay.

On the other hand, failure modes which prevent the circuit from detecting trains (known as a wrong-side failure) are possible. Examples include:

- Mechanical failure of the relay, causing the relay to be stuck in the "track clear" position even when the track is occupied.
  - One perspex case warped in the heat, and touched the relay contacts, holding them up.
  - Another Q-series "miniature" relay saw a metal washer slip off and jam the relay contacts up; the half-washers had to be replaced by full-circle washers.
- Conditions which partially or completely insulate the wheels from the rail, such as rust, sand, or dry leaves on the rails. This is also known as "poor shunting" ("failure to shunt" in North America and Australia). Sanding gear which operates on all wheels of an engine traveling light can temporarily insulate it from the rails until the sanding ceases and the locomotive has moved further down the track.
- Where multiple parallel paths exist for traction return purposes broken rail detection will be lost for the rail that is used for the traction return. If more than one break occurs in that rail a false clear can occur when the train is between the breaks.
- Conditions in the trackbed (roadbed) which create stray electrical signals, such as muddy ballast (which can generate a "battery effect") or parasitic electrical currents from nearby power transmission lines.
- Parasitic oscillations in the equipment that controls the track circuits.
- Equipment which is not heavy enough to make good electrical contact (shunt failure) or whose wheels must be electrically insulated.
- A rail break between the insulated rail joint and the track circuit feed wiring would not be detected.

Failure modes that result in an incorrect "track clear" signal (known usually in North America as a "false clear") may allow a train to enter an occupied block, creating the risk of a collision. Wheel scale and short trains may also be a problem. They may also cause the warning systems at a grade crossing to fail to activate. This is why in UK practice, a treadle is also used in crossing circuitry.

Different means are used to respond to these types of failures. For example, the relays are designed to a very high level of reliability. In areas with electrical problems, different types of track circuits may be used which are less susceptible to interference. Speeds may be restricted when and where fallen leaves are an issue. Traffic may be embargoed to let equipment pass which does not reliably shunt the rails.

Sabotage is possible. In the 1995 Palo Verde derailment, saboteurs electrically connected sections of rail which they had displaced to conceal the breaks in the track they had made. The track circuit therefore did not detect the breaks, and the engine driver was not given a "Stop" indication. Another form of sabotage, not intended to cause a train crash but merely to make trains stop and slow down unnecessarily in an effort to sabotage an economy or potential injuries, is to tie a wire between the 2 rails, causing a false obstruction signal.

=== Railhead contamination and rust ===
The track circuit relies upon an adequate electrical contact between the rail and the wheel; contamination can insulate the one from the other. A common problem is fallen leaves, though there have been cases where crushed insects have also caused detection failures.

A more persistent problem is rust. Usually the railhead is kept clean of rust by the regular passage of trains' wheels. Lines which are not used regularly can become so rusty as to prevent vehicles being detected. Seldom-used points and crossovers and the extremities of terminal platform lines are also prone to rusting. Measures to overcome this include:

- Depression bars or treadles to detect vehicles; these are mechanical;
- Stainless steel strips (often zig zag in shape) welded on the railheads; stainless steel does not rust;
- High-voltage impulse track circuits;
- Track circuit assistor (TCA) - a train-mounted system that breaks down the resistance of the rust layer;
- Axle counters over the affected section
- Tunnel sticks whereby a track circuit cannot pick up unless a train is detected in the next track circuit.

=== Scale ===
Insulated blockjoints can be bridged by wheel scale in some circumstances causing one or two track circuits to fail. This problem may be reduced by having a pair of blockjoints in series about 4 m apart. The short 4 m section would not itself be track circuited.

=== Immunization ===
Electric locomotives must avoid generating noise in the frequencies that track circuits use. The SNCB Class 13 had such problems.

=== Transitory problems ===
A short, lightweight and fast train passing over an insulated blockjoint may disappear from the departing track circuit before it appears in the arriving track circuit, allowing false clear signals to be given. This problem can be overcome by introducing a time delay of say 1–2 seconds into the departing track circuit. Electronic track circuits such as the CSEE can easily incorporate such a time delay.

== Siding turnout ==
It is sometimes convenient to wire the detectors of a set of points through the track circuit over those points. This can be done in one of two ways:

- A contact of the points detector can shunt the track circuit when the points are reverse, putting the signals to red, however this is not failsafe.
- The track circuit can be split with extra blockjoints and the detectors in the points complete the track circuit when the points are normal and the signal is entitled to receive a green light. This is partially fail-safe.
- A second relay can be installed on the turnout, with its contacts wired in series with the main relay. This is fail-safe but expensive.

== Track-circuit operating clips ==
A simple piece of safety equipment which is carried by all heavy rail trains in Britain is a track-circuit operating clip (TCOC). This is a length of wire connecting two metal spring clips that clip onto a rail. In the event of accident or obstruction a clip applied to both rails will indicate that that line is occupied, putting the signal for that section to danger.

Emergency protection procedure in the UK requires TCOCs to be placed on all affected running lines if contact cannot be made immediately with the signaller following an accident where adjacent lines are blocked.

TCOCs are ineffective where train detection is not by means of track circuits, such as axle counters or treadles.

== History ==
The first use of track circuiting was by William Robert Sykes on a short stretch of track of the London Chatham and Dover Railway at Brixton in 1864. The failsafe track circuit was invented in 1872 by William Robinson, an American electrical and mechanical engineer. His introduction of a trustworthy method of block occupancy detection was key to the development of the automatic signalling systems now in nearly universal use.

The first railway signals were manually operated by signal tenders or station agents. When to change the signal aspect was often left to the judgement of the operator. Human error or inattentiveness occasionally resulted in improper signalling and train collisions.

The introduction of the telegraph during the mid-nineteenth century showed that information could be electrically conveyed over considerable distance, spurring the investigation into methods of electrically controlling railway signals. Although several systems were developed prior to Robinson's, none could automatically respond to train movements.

Robinson first demonstrated a fully automatic railway signalling system in model form in 1870. A full-sized version was subsequently installed on the Philadelphia and Erie Railroad at Ludlow, Pennsylvania (a.k.a. Kinzua, PA), where it proved to be practical. His design consisted of electrically operated discs located atop small trackside signal huts, and was based on an open track circuit. When no train was within the block no power was applied to the signal, indicating a clear track.

An inherent weakness of this arrangement was that it could fail in an unsafe state. For example, a broken wire in the track circuit would falsely indicate that no train was in the block, even if one was. Recognizing this, Robinson devised the closed loop track circuit described above, and in 1872, installed it in place of the previous circuit. The result was a fully automatic, failsafe signalling system that was the prototype for subsequent development.

Although a pioneer in the use of signals controlling trains, the UK was slow to adopt Robinson's design. At the time, many carriages on UK railways had wooden axles and/or wheels with wooden hubs, making them incompatible with track circuits.

== Accidents ==
=== Caused by lack of track circuits ===
Numerous accidents would have been prevented by the provision of track circuits, including:

- (United Kingdom) Norton Fitzwarren rail crash (1890)
- (United Kingdom) Hawes Junction rail crash (1910)
- (United Kingdom) Quintinshill rail crash (1915)
- (Australia) Geurie crossing loop collision (1963)

=== Caused by track circuit failure ===
Much rarer are accidents caused when the track circuits themselves fail. For example:

- (Australia) Cowan rail disaster, which occurred when sand on the rails insulated the wheels from the rails, causing a failure to shunt that allowed a trailing block signal to improperly display a clear aspect, resulting in a rear-end collision.
- (Czech Republic) Moravany railway crash, occurred in Moravany railway station. Broken sand dispenser caused a layer of sand being created on the rail, making it lose the shunt. The station equipment interpreted this as the track is free and allowed another train in to proceed into the station, which then crashed into the previous train from behind.
- (United States) June 22, 2009 Washington Metro train collision, which occurred when a parasitic oscillation developed in a track circuit control module.

=== Broken rails ===
Because Track circuits operate by passing a current through one or both of the tracks, they can sometimes detect if a rail has broken completely. However, if the break is only partial or is at a turnout (set of points) detection may not be possible.

- (United Kingdom) Hither Green rail crash (1967) - derailment due to top of rail having broken off
- (United States) Weyauwega derailment (1996) - undetected broken rail in turnout.
- (United States) Big Bayou Canot rail accident (1993) - undetected unbroken but badly twisted continuous welded rail on a bridge that still indicated a clear condition to the signal.

== See also ==
- Application of railway signals
- Track circuit interrupter
- Wrong-side failure
