= Track circuit interrupter =

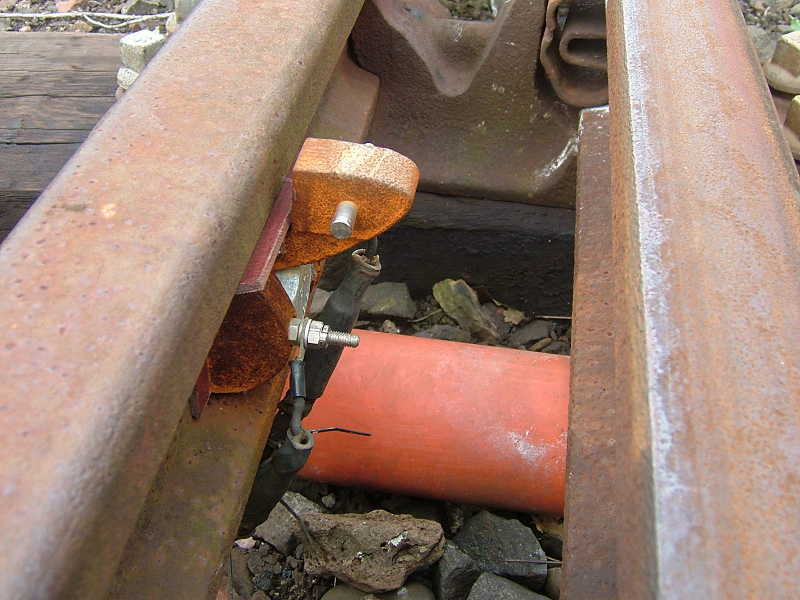
An insulated track circuit interrupter fitted to trap points

A track circuit interrupter may be fitted at catch points, trap points or buffer stops to maintain a track circuit in the 'occupied' state in the event of a derailment. The track circuit remains de-energised until the interrupter is replaced.

GK/RT0011 specifies the requirements for the provision of track circuit interrupters.

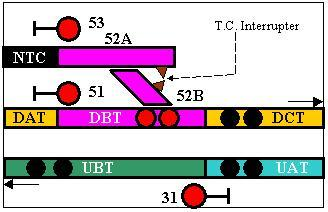
Interrupter drawn as two filled triangles. Assume train has overrun 53 signal and 52A trap points and interrupter shows DBT T.C. on Down Line as blocked (twin red lights).
