= Railway signalling in New Zealand =

Railway signalling in New Zealand consists of a number of signalling technologies on the national rail network.

== History ==
The first railway line in New Zealand (apart from tramways) was the line from Christchurch to Ferrymead (now part of the Lyttelton Line) opened in 1863. Under the "Grand Go-ahead Policy" of public works instituted by Sir Julius Vogel in 1870 (see Vogel Era) the network was rapidly expanded. Initially, lines went from the main town and port to the rural hinterland, but the line between the cities of Christchurch and Dunedin (part of the Main South Line) section of the South Island Main Trunk Railway opened in 1878.

The New Zealand Railways Department was established in 1876, and the rail network was then run by the central government rather than by provincial governments. Signalling installation was handled by district engineers in the maintenance branch.

The Rakaia rail accident in 1899 when four passengers were killed showed the deficiencies in railway signalling and braking; Rakaia did not have fixed signals, and rolling stock apart from locomotives did not have air brakes. But those lines with heavier traffic already had block working installed. The first signalling and interlocking engineer had already been appointed in 1899 at a salary of £400; Arthur H. Johnson, who had "considerable experience in England and America" and who was to design and develop a uniform system of interlocking points and signals. He resigned in 1899, and returned to England c1901. He was replaced by Henry John Wynne from 1900; with staff of a chief signal inspector in Wellington and several regional signal inspectors. Wynne retired in 1929. Wynne was replaced by Guy Wilfred Wyles (1887–1947) as signalling and electrical engineer. Wyles had started with Sykes Interlocking Co in London. He married into Wynn's family and died of peritonitis three months before his retirement.

The first three engineers were all trained in England. Signalling in New Zealand was based on British practice for 60 years until about 1922, when it became "essentially indigenous" – partly British with two-aspect mechanical signalling and partly American with automatic three-aspect signalling using so-called '"speed' indicators.

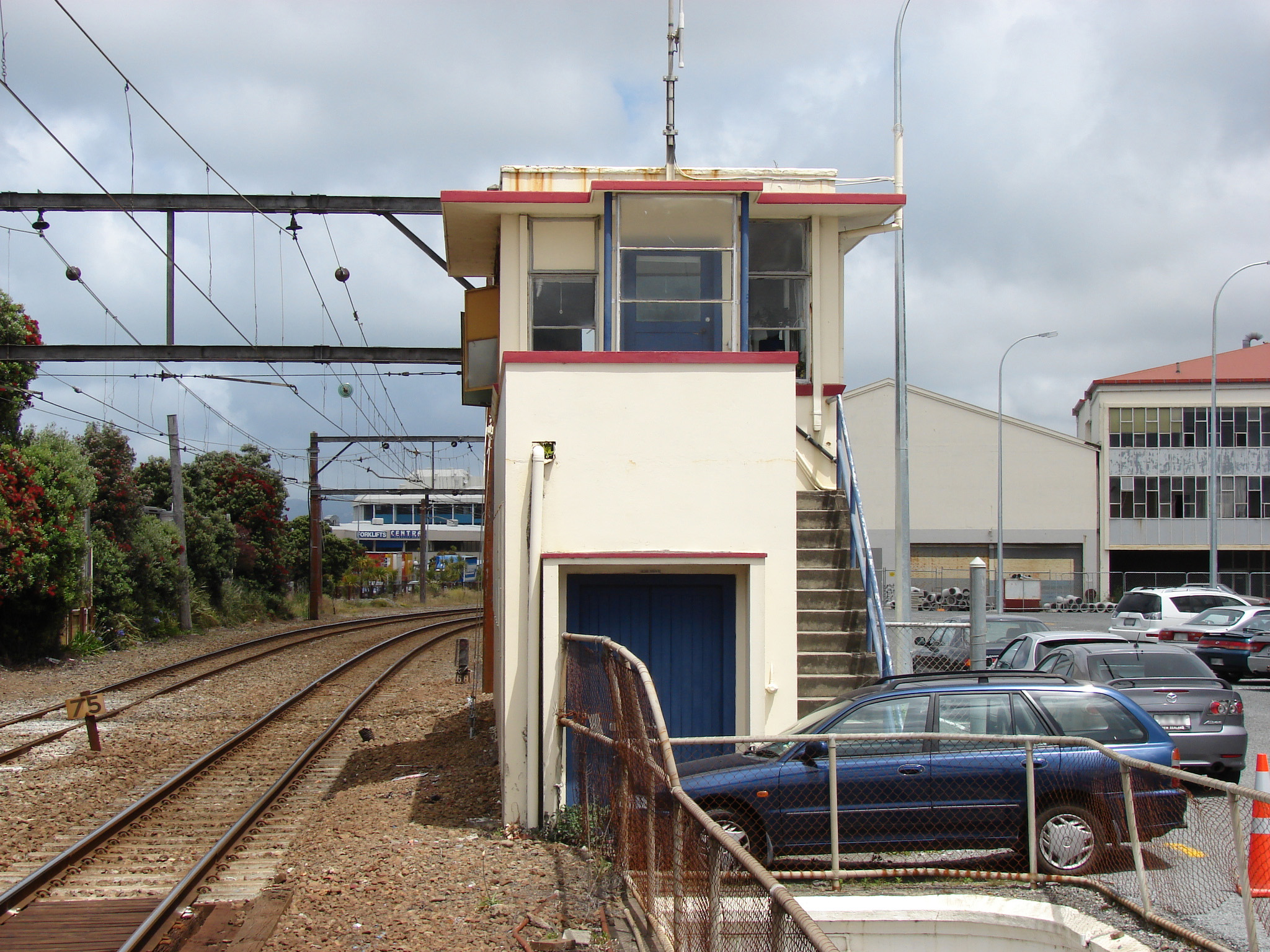
The Petone signal box at the Petone railway station, 1952-2013

== Systems used ==
Train signalling systems used in New Zealand were:

- Tyers' No 7 Tablet system
- Centralised Traffic Control (CTC),
- Block working using Winters block working (single-line) or Sykes' lock and block working (double-line).
- Track Warrant Control (TWC) and Station Limits
- Double Line Automatic (DLA), (a form of absolute block working).
- Automatic Signalling Rules (ASR)

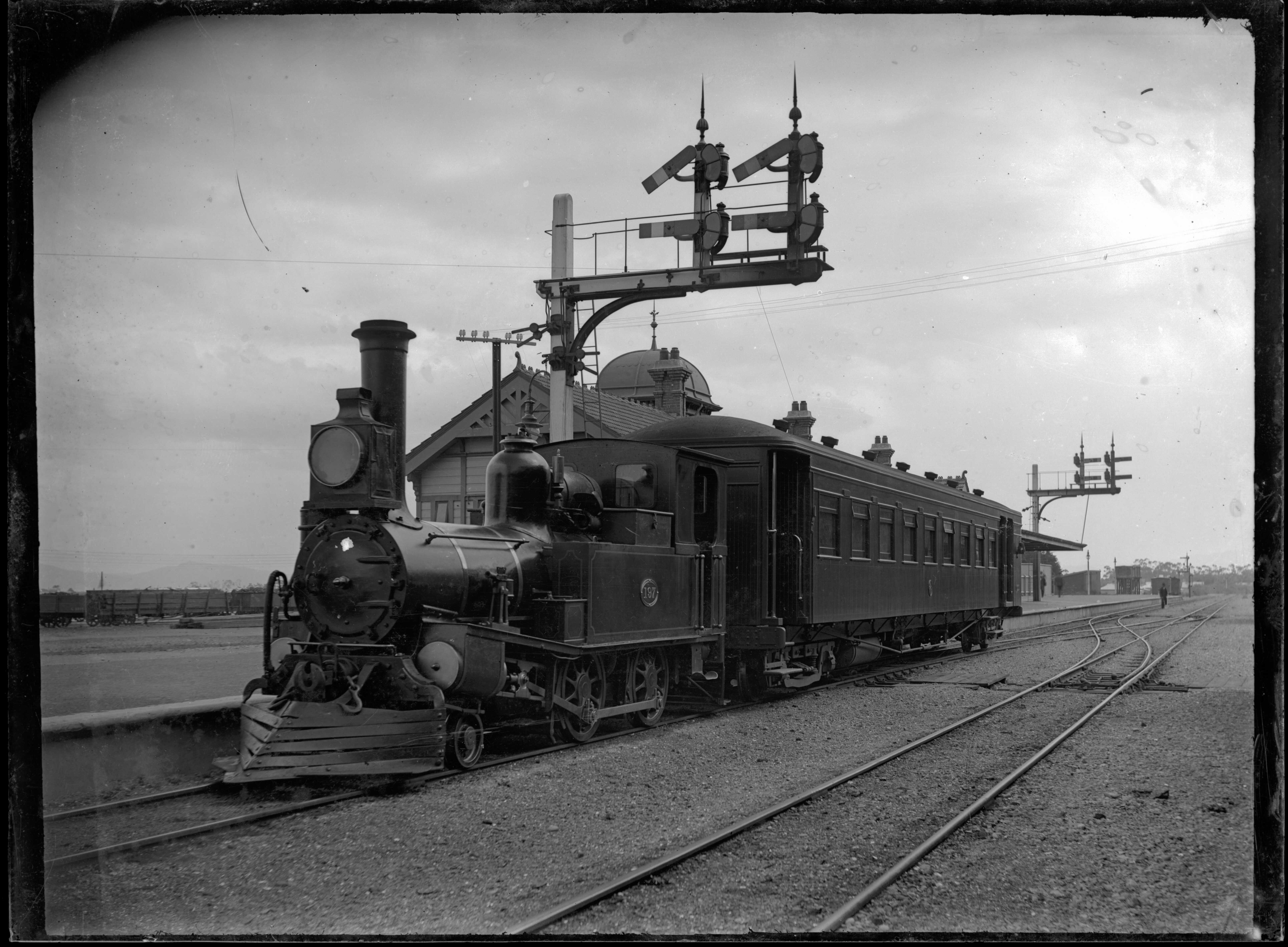
Semaphore signals at Lower Hutt railway station (now Western Hutt railway station, 1906

== Equipment ==
The equipment used was often from Westinghouse (including the Westronic S2 CTC system) or from McKenzie & Holland, a British firm which had Australian and New Zealand subsidiaries or branches, with factories. In 1894 the firm obtained the patent rights of the British subsidiary of Westinghouse Air Brake Co of Pittsburg, Pa, UJSA; in 1907 it combined but did not merge to form the Mckenzie, Holland and Westinghouse Power Signal Co of London; in 1920 with Saxby interests formed the Westinghouse & Saxeby Signal Co (WB&SS) of London; in 1935 it became the Westinghouse Brake and Signal Co (WBS). The two Australian branches became separate companies; in 1960 the holding company WBS Australia formed McKenzie & Holland (N.Z.) to manufacture Westinghouse rectifiers. In 1979 the Westinghouse Group was taken over by the Hawker Siddeley Group. Other manufacturers used were Siemens, AEI-GRS, GPT Plessey, GRS Syncrostep, and British Power Railway Signalling Co (B.P.R.S.) Power-operated points were generally electrically driven with 110V ac Westinghouse Brake and Signal (WBS), M2, M3 and M5 style equipment. At Auckland, Dunedin and the Te Rapa marshalling yard were air operated (pneumatic). Marton had SGE 110 v dc points.

== The Tyer Tablet system ==
Tyer's tablet working using the Tyer's No 7 system was used in New Zealand from 1901 to 1994, as most lines apart from sections near the main centres were single-track.

Train Advice 5685, final tablet

Tablets were of red fibre, 99 mm diameter and 6 mm thick, and weighed 55g. They were marked with the serial number and the names of the station at each end of the section; and had a range of notches and types of centre hole to match them to pairs of machines. Tablets were originally exchanged by hand using cane slings. Later (safer) mechanical exchangers were used, although some stock (DX locomotives and Silver Fern railcars) did not have tablet forks, and slings had to be used unless the train stopped there. When exchanging tablets, speed was limited to 45 mph (72 km/h).

Initially, each section was issued with 24 tablets for a block section, often increased to 30. Occasionally tablets were lost, e.g. Tawa Flat-Porirua in 1932, and the section then operated with 29 tablets. In 1954 at Okahukura a tablet porter put the tablet on the shovelling plate. When the driver asked "Where's the biscuit (pill, apple)?" it had been shovelled into the firebox, and someone (who?) was fined a week's wage (£5 or $10). The number of tablets in each exchanger was kept at five or more. On sections where banking engines were used in one direction e.g. Owhango-Raurimu a linesman would periodically transfer tablets to the other end (the banker would assist a train but then return solo but light to the other end. Some places had a weekly "jigger" trip to return a tablet; e.g. Mangaroa (between Upper Hutt and Kaitoke) and Canterbury (Rakaia to Bankside). Station equipment was powered by 12 to 20 Leclanché cells which provided 18 to 30 volts, and stations were connected by a single-wire earth return circuit.

The Tablet system was "labour-intensive and time-consuming". The staff at each station had to communicate by bell signals before the tablet was changed by the engine staff. Each tablet-station required three (tablet) porters and a station-master, often at isolated locations in the country, with each having a NZR staff house. Some tablet stations required four porters, e.g. Plimmerton and Tawa. When the Wellington-Paekakariki section was double-tracked apart from the single-track North-South Junction part, it was estimated in 1948 that tablet working of the whole section required 19 staff and 11 staff houses at an annual cost of £12,614 ($25,228). CTC working required 8 staff and 4 staff houses, at an estimated cost of £7246 ($14,492). Staffing could be reduced by combining two sections at slack times at a switchout station; holiday switchout stations were used where occasionally a number of trains were stopping near (say) a race-course or stock sale yards.

The last line to use the tablet system was the Wairarapa Line: The last tablet used on the New Zealand Railways allowed train 1602 (Wellington – Masterton morning Wairarapa Connection) to travel between Featherston and Masterton on the Wairarapa Line on Monday 4 July 1994. Even though the Masterton to Woodville tablet sections survived a few days longer, trains ran on a safe all where Train Control could allow a train to run without a tablet. The sections were:

- Featherston railway station – Carterton railway station – Masterton railway station
- Masterton railway station – Pahiatua railway station
- Pahiatua – Woodville railway station

== Centralised Traffic Control (CTC) ==
Centralized traffic control (CTC) was installed on 2 October 1938 between Okahukura and Taumarunui (10.8 km), then in December 1939 between Te Kuiti to Puketutu (13.9 km); so enabling new intermediate crossing loops at Taringamotu and Waiteti. A loop at Waiteti was needed to reduce the occupancy time south of Te Kuiti, as steam locos took a long time to climb the steep grade, and restricted train capacity). Then in February 1940 CTC from Tawa (Flat) to Paekakariki (26 km) was commissioned in association with electrification

== North Island Main Trunk Line ==
The North Island Main Trunk railway line between Auckland and Wellington opened in 1909 and incorporated the Wellington-Manawatu Line from Wellington to Longburn built by the Wellington and Manawatu Railway Company. Single-track sections of the North Island Main Trunk between Auckland and Wellington were controlled by Tyer's No 7 system; most of the line was single-track. Each of the stations for the 94 tablet sections required three tablet porters who each worked a 56-hour week for continuous coverage. Hence each station (many in isolated locations) required at least four houses, for the stationmaster and three porters.

The 1925 Fay-Raven Commission recommended the full introduction of the "Train Control" system throughout New Zealand. On the NIMT from Auckland to Wellington (then 426 miles or 685 km); it was introduced to supplement the Tablet system as follows on successive sections: Thorndon to Marton and Auckland to Mercer in 1928; Mercer to Frankton in 1929; the new Westfield Deviation (Auckland) in 1930, and Marton to Ohakune and Ohakune to Frankton in turn during 1932. The four operational sections were:

- Auckland to Frankton, 85 miles (137 km), controlled from Auckland
- Frankton to Taumarunui, 90 miles (140 km), controlled from Te Kuiti
- Taumarunui to Marton, 136 milres (219 km), controlled from Ohakune
- Marton to Wellington, 112 miles (180 km), controlled from Wellington

Centralised Traffic Control (CTC) was commissioned in stages from 2 October 1938, but Tyers Tablet control remained on some sections up to 5 December 1966. In 1957 it was announced that the remaining outdated sections (354 km) would be converted to CTC; with control centres at Ohakune, Taihape and Palmerston North. It was estimated that this would save 74 staff on traffic duties required for the Taumarunui to Otaki section. The Piriaka to Owhango section of the Taumarunui to Ohakune section (80.7 km) was the last section to be converted to CTC.

CTC control stations were located at:

- Auckland
- Mercer (to 1973, then to Auckland)
- Te Kuiti (1957 – to 1964)
- Taumarunui (from 1977?)
- Mataroa (1958 – 1963) for Mataroa-Hihitahi.
- Ohakune (1964 - to Taumarunui, 1977)
- Taihape (1963 – 1987) for Waioru – Marton; to Taumarunui progressively
- Palmerston North (from 1959)
- Wellington (from 1940)
- Hamilton Travel Centre (Waikato) controlled Waikato lines

Bill Pierre travelled the Ohakune-National Park section soon after CTC had been installed, and there were no longer any attended stations on the section. He was surprised to have difficulty in locating the Horopito, Pokaka and Erua station sites, as all buildings (station, houses etc.) had been removed to foil vandals. There was a long crossing loop about seven miles (11 km) north of Ohakune; loops could now be installed independent of stations. At other stations on the line, small goods sheds were awaiting the local road-haulier. He also saw new kilometre pegs indicating the distance from Wellington (which had been adopted as the North Island zero point from 1 April 1974); previously mile pegs had indicated the distance from Auckland). The rural settlements of the King Country have been depopulated, and few trains now stop at Kune, which had been the operations centre for the Taumarunui-Waioru section.

== Signalling equipment problems and failures ==
Light railcars (Midland and Wairarapa classes) were a problem on both the Midland and Wairarapa lines, as after non-use of the line e.g. overnight the wheel-to-rail resistance was too high to detect them by "shunting" the track relays until a loco had been over the track; this also happened from heavy sanding by locos and with the heavier Standard (Aotea) class railcars on the Palmerston North - Gisborne Line.

In June 2022 signalling equipment failures at Auckland and Wellington disrupted life for many commuters on busy suburban lines for several days.

At Wellington on Monday 20 June an equipment fault disrupted trains through the double track "choke point" (soon to have a third line) in the Wellington rail yard where four tracks converge before the station platforms. It was eventually traced to a loose card remote from the signal box which was installed ten years ago; the manufacturer could not identify the error code. Normal traffic resumed at noon on 21 June. The "choke point" in the Wellington yard was explained after a derailment in 2019.

At Auckland on 20 June a contractor cut power to a KiwiRail site instead of to an adjacent property, and backup power was not adequate. Disruption to several lines occurred.

== Automatic Signalling Rules (ASR) Aspects ==
The Automatic Signalling Rules are a form of speed signalling, derived from American practises.

Colour Light Aspects
Image	Name	Signal Call	Meaning
	Normal Clear Speed	Normal Clear	Proceed not exceeding line speed, does not indicate any upcoming restrictions.
	Caution Prepare to Stop	Caution to Stop	Proceed not exceeding line speed, but be ready to stop at the next signal
	Stop Absolute Signal	All Red Stop	Do not proceed past this signal until it changes to a less restrictive aspect or if authorised to.
	Stop Permissive Signal	All Red Stop	Stop for 10 seconds, then the train may proceed at a speed that allows the train to stop short of any obstructions.
	Clear Medium Speed*	Medium, Clear	Proceed past this signal not exceeding medium speed until the train has cleared the points.
	Caution Medium Speed Prepare to Stop*	Medium to Stop	Proceed past this signal not exceeding medium speed until the train has cleared the points, and be prepared to stop at the next signal.
	Caution Reduce to Medium Speed*	Reduce to Medium	Proceed not exceeding line speed, be prepared to pass the next signal at medium speed.
	Low Speed^{†}	Low Speed	Proceed not exceeding low speed or a speed that allows the train to stop short of any obstructions.
Advance Caution Aspects
	Advance Caution Prepare to Stop^{‡}	Advance Caution to Stop	Proceed not exceeding line speed, expect the next signal ahead to be displaying a 'Caution to Stop' aspect and be prepared to stop at the second signal.
	Advance Caution Normal Speed to Medium Speed*^{‡}	Advance Caution to Medium	Proceed not exceeding line speed, expect the next signal to be displaying a 'Reduce to Medium' aspect and be prepared to pass the second signal at medium speed.
Intermediate Speed Aspects^{⸸}
	Clear Intermediate Speed^{⸸}	Intermediate, Clear	Proceed past this signal not exceeding intermediate speed until the train has cleared the points.
	Caution Intermediate Speed Prepare to Stop^{⸸}	Intermediate to Stop	Proceed past this signal not exceeding intermediate speed until the train has cleared the points, and be prepared to stop at the next signal.
	Caution Reduce to Intermediate Speed^{⸸}	Reduce to Intermediate	Proceed not exceeding line speed, be prepared to pass the next signal at intermediate speed.

*Medium speed is 25 km/h unless otherwise specified by a medium speed board.

^{†}Low speed is also 25 km/h unless otherwise specified by a low speed board.

^{‡}The 'Advance Caution Prepare to Stop' and 'Advance Caution Normal Speed to Medium Speed' signal aspects are only displayed in the Auckland and Wellington metro areas.

^{⸸}Intermediate speed is 50 km/h unless otherwise specified by an intermediate speed board. This is the New Zealand equivalent of US limited speed but using a metric speed that is different. These aspects are used within Christchurch and Rolleston station limits.
