= Henry John Wynne =

British railway engineer (1864–1950)

Henry John Wynne (1864–1950) was a railways signals engineer in Scotland, the Netherlands and New Zealand.

Wynne was born in Worcester, England in 1864, and was apprenticed to the manufacturer of railways signalling equipment McKenzie and Holland of Worcester for seven years in 1878. He was appointed assistant engineer and signalling superintendent to the Highland Railway of Scotland in February 1890.

In March 1900 he was appointed Signals Engineer to the government-owned New Zealand Railways; he started on 4 April after visiting America en route to study American signalling practices. He was responsible for the rapid adoption for the Tyers Electric Train Tablet No 7 system on New Zealand single-track lines (the majority of lines).

In 1912 he was elected as a member of the Institution of Railway Signal Engineers (IRSE) in the first group of overseas members elected.

He retired in 1929, and died in his 86th year in Wellington on 18 July 1950.

== See also ==
- Railway signalling in New Zealand
