= Control panel (engineering) =

Control device in engineering

A control panel is a flat, often vertical, area where control or monitoring instruments are displayed or it is an enclosed unit that is the part of a system that users can access, such as the control panel of a security system (also called control unit).

They are found in factories to monitor and control machines or production lines and in places such as nuclear power plants, ships, aircraft and mainframe computers. Older control panels are most often equipped with push buttons and analog instruments, whereas nowadays in many cases touchscreens are used for monitoring and control purposes.

== Gallery ==
=== Flat panels ===
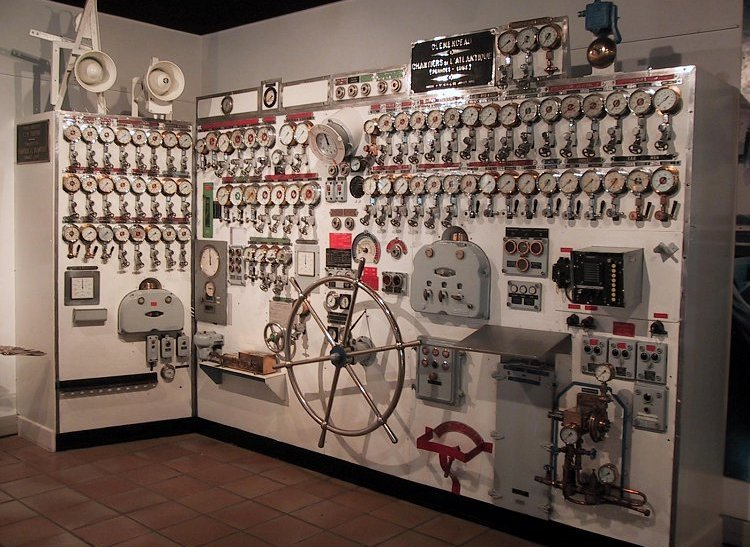
Control panel of the engines of the Clémenceau aircraft carrier

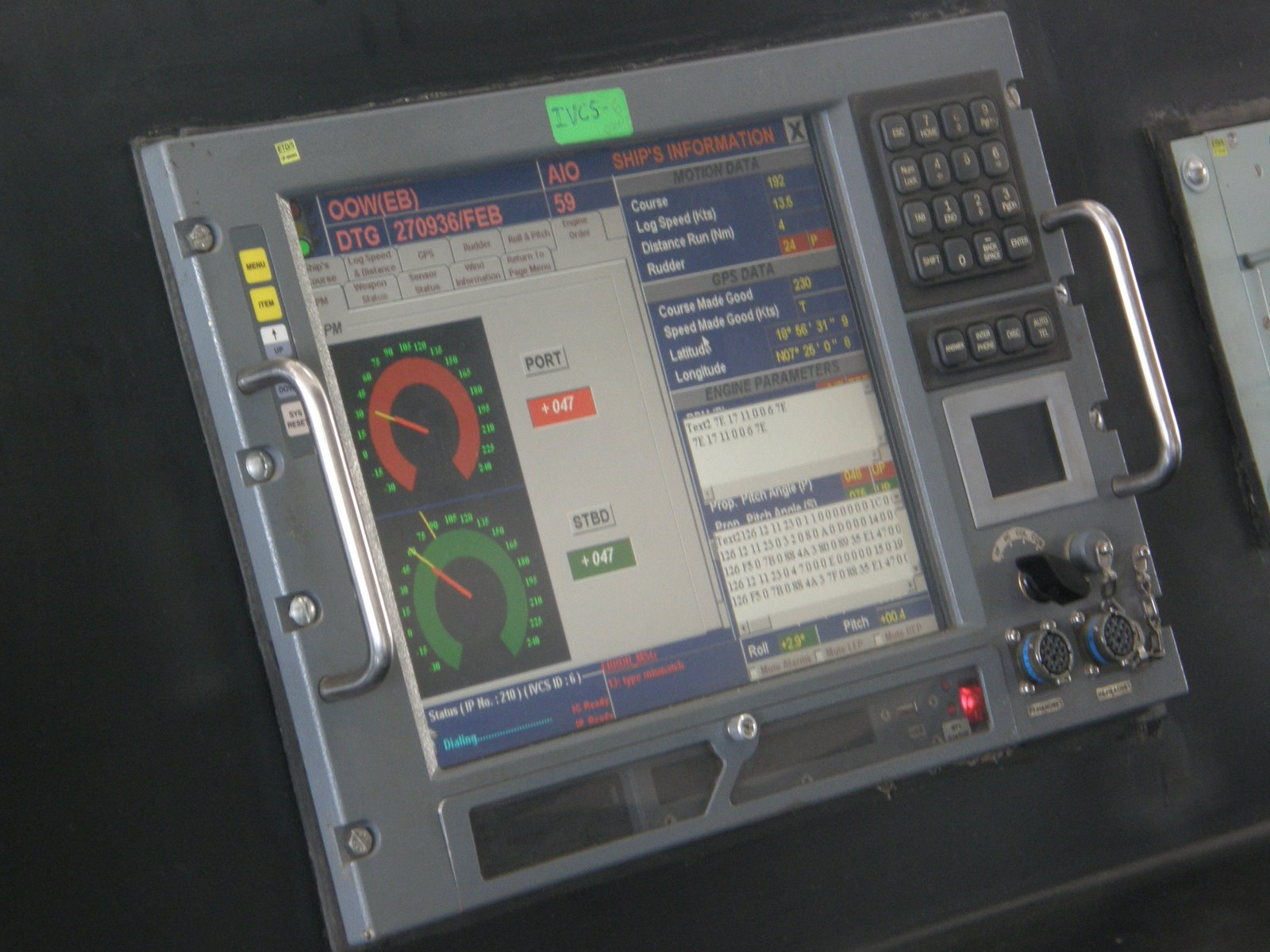
Control panel with touchscreen for the frigate INS Shivalik

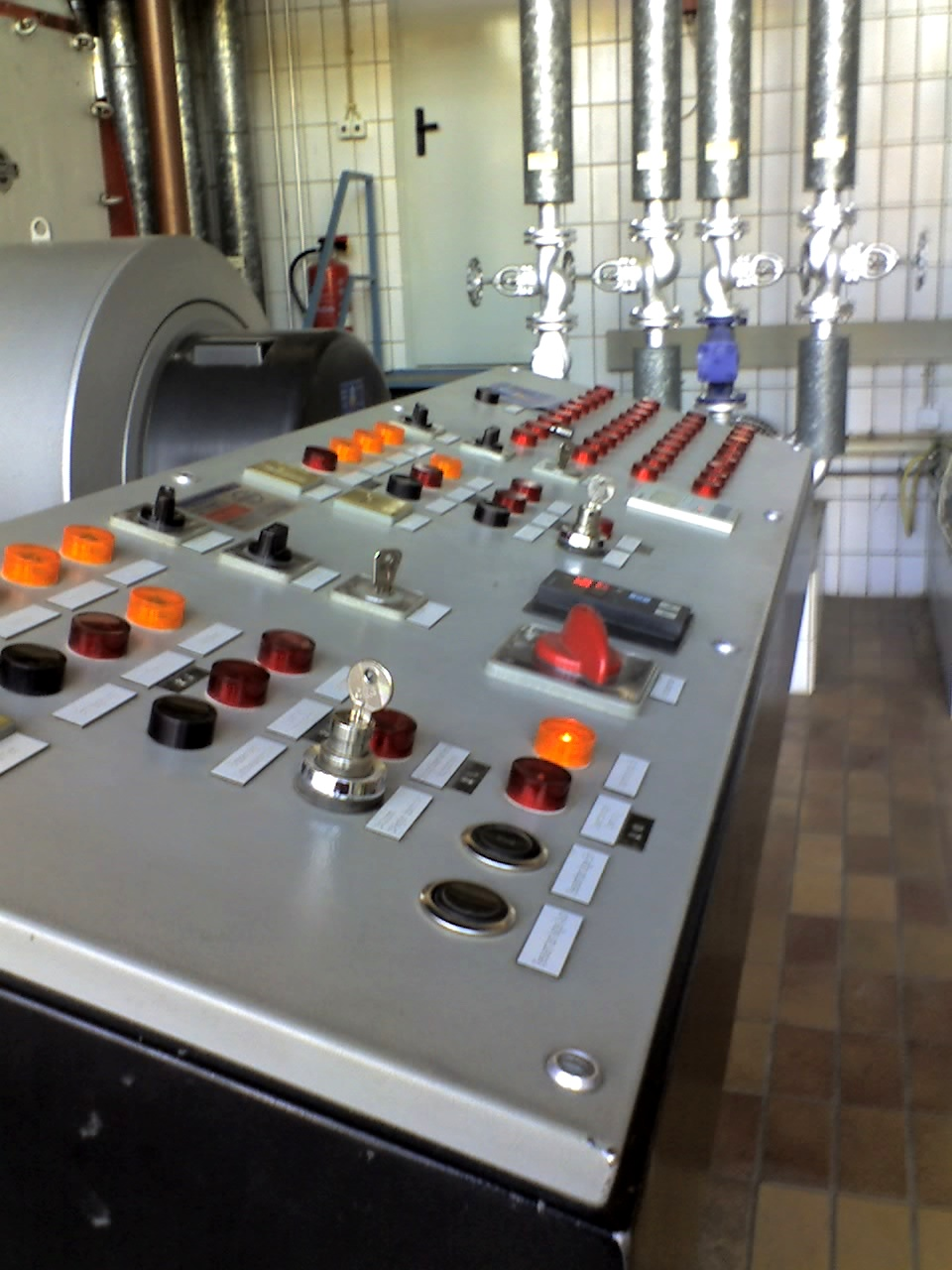
Control panel from two Horizontal Return Tubular boiler

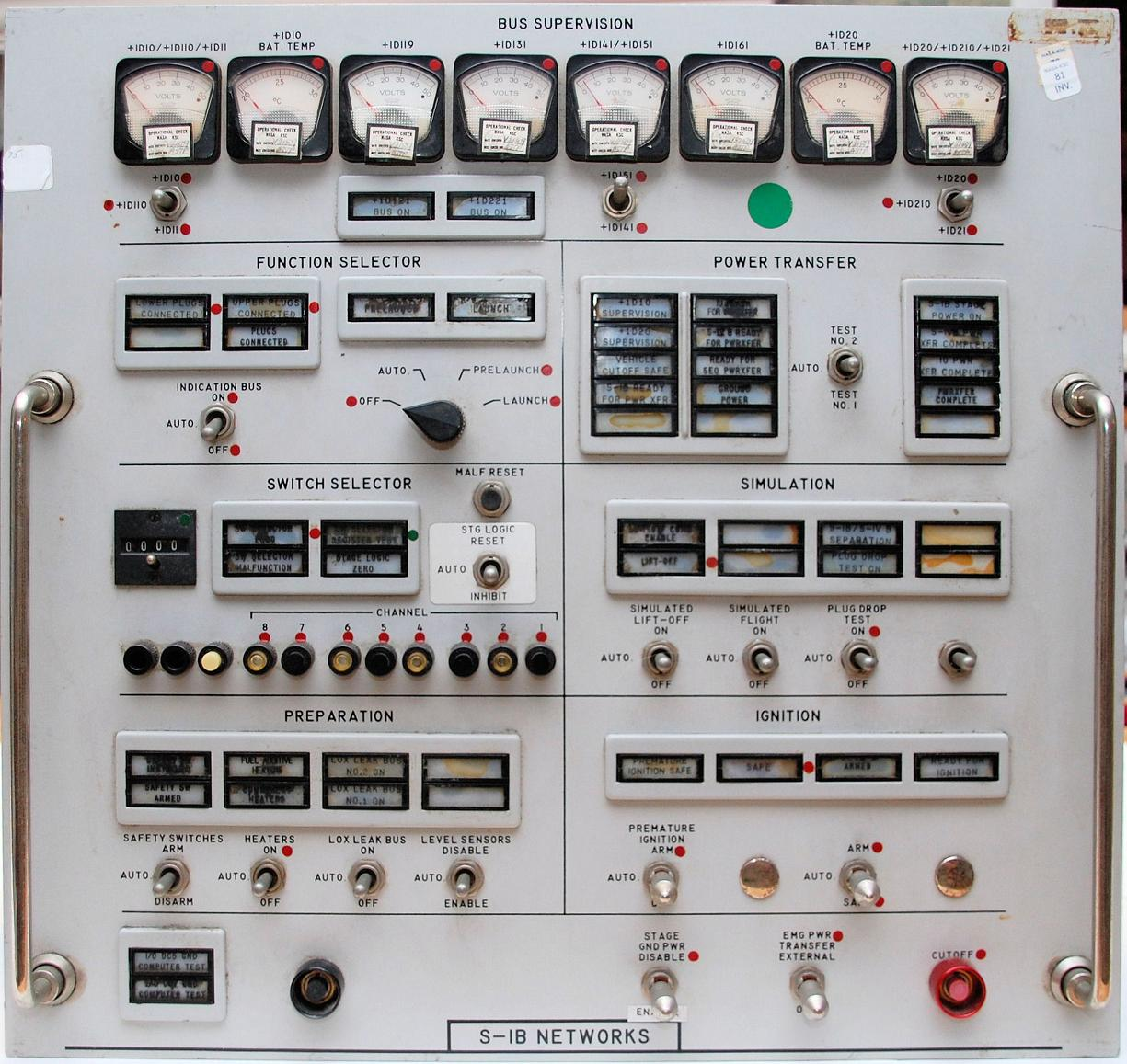
One of the control panels from the Kennedy Space Center Launch Control Center Firing Room during the Apollo era

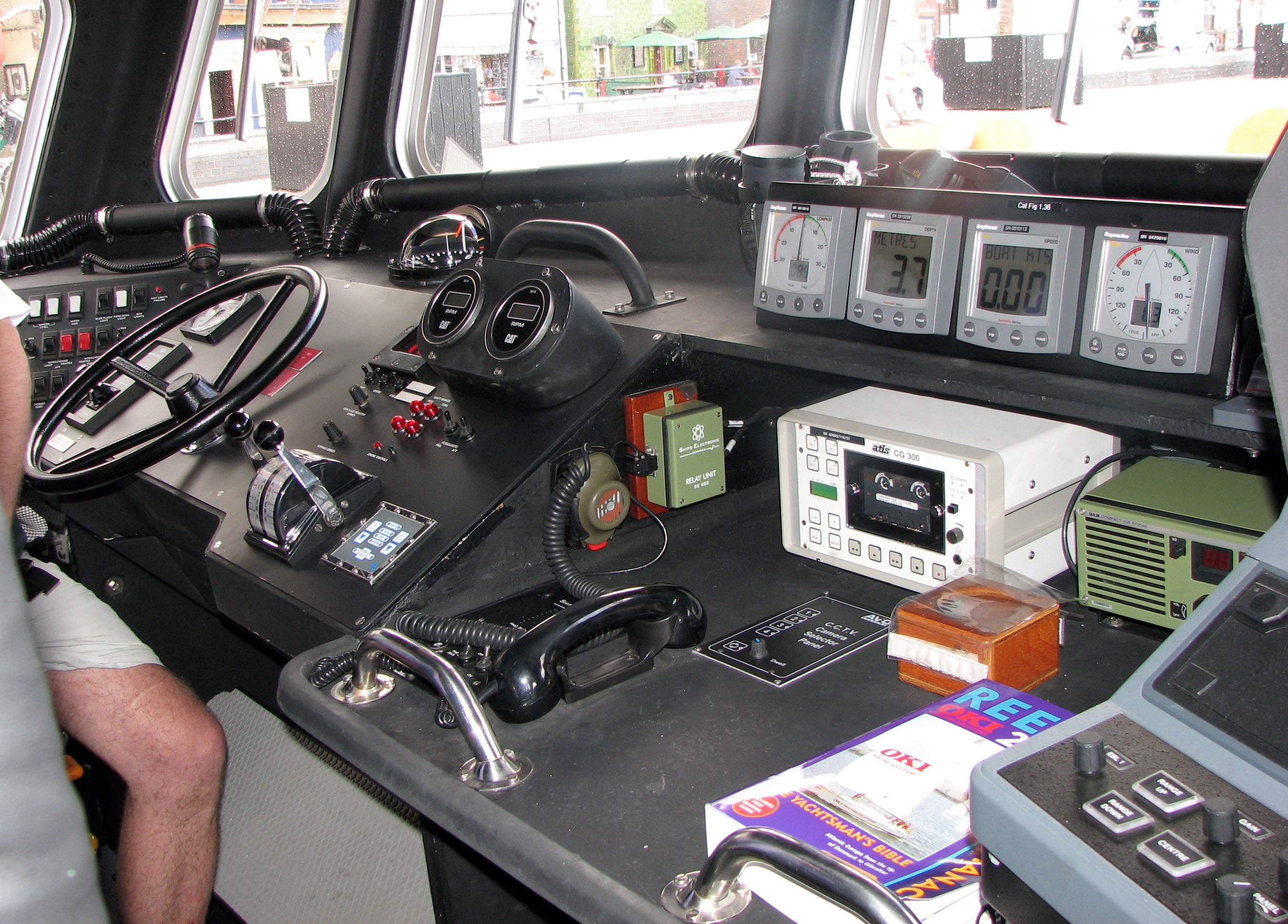
Some of the control panels of a Severn class lifeboat

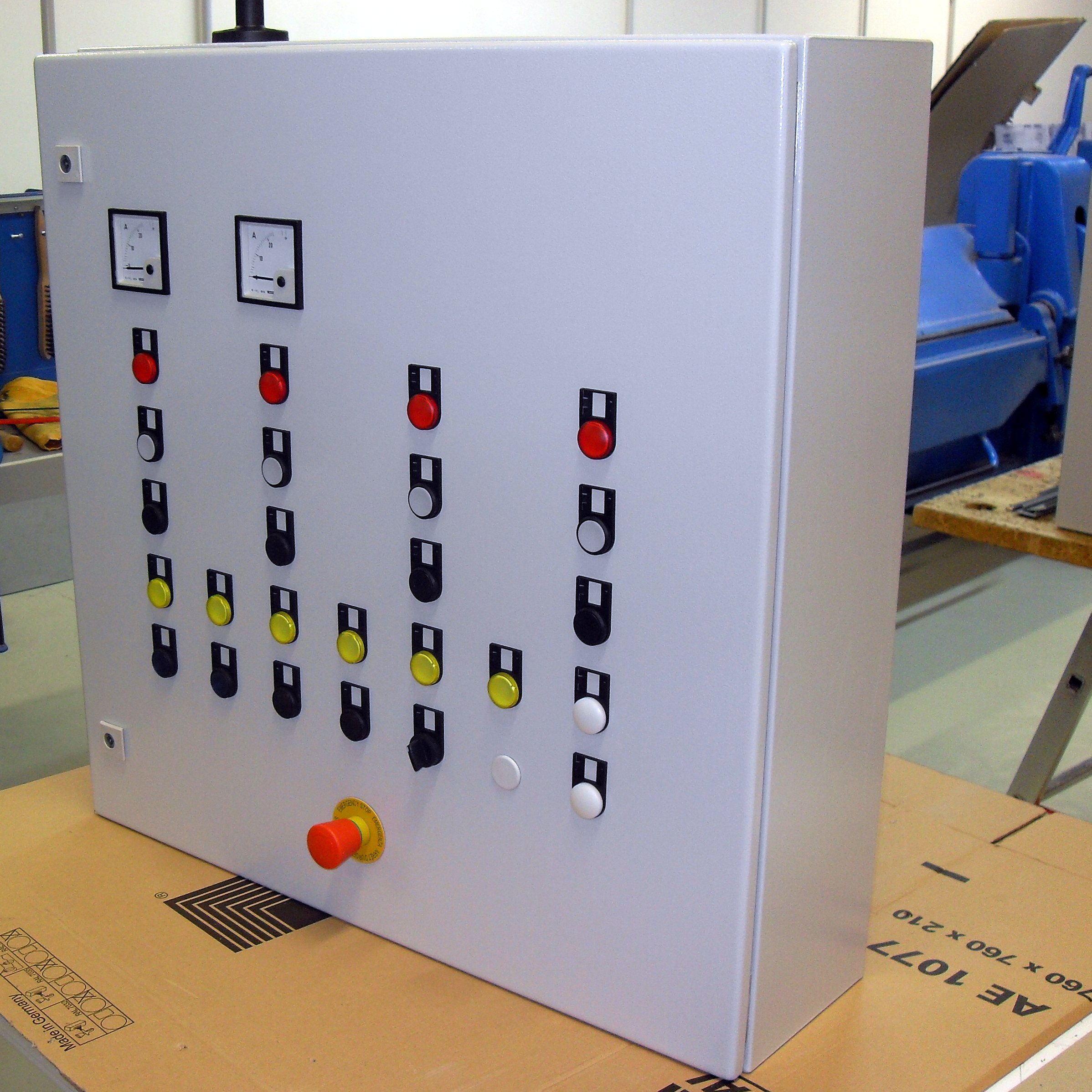
HMI of a machine for the sugar industry with pushbuttons

=== Enclosed control unit ===
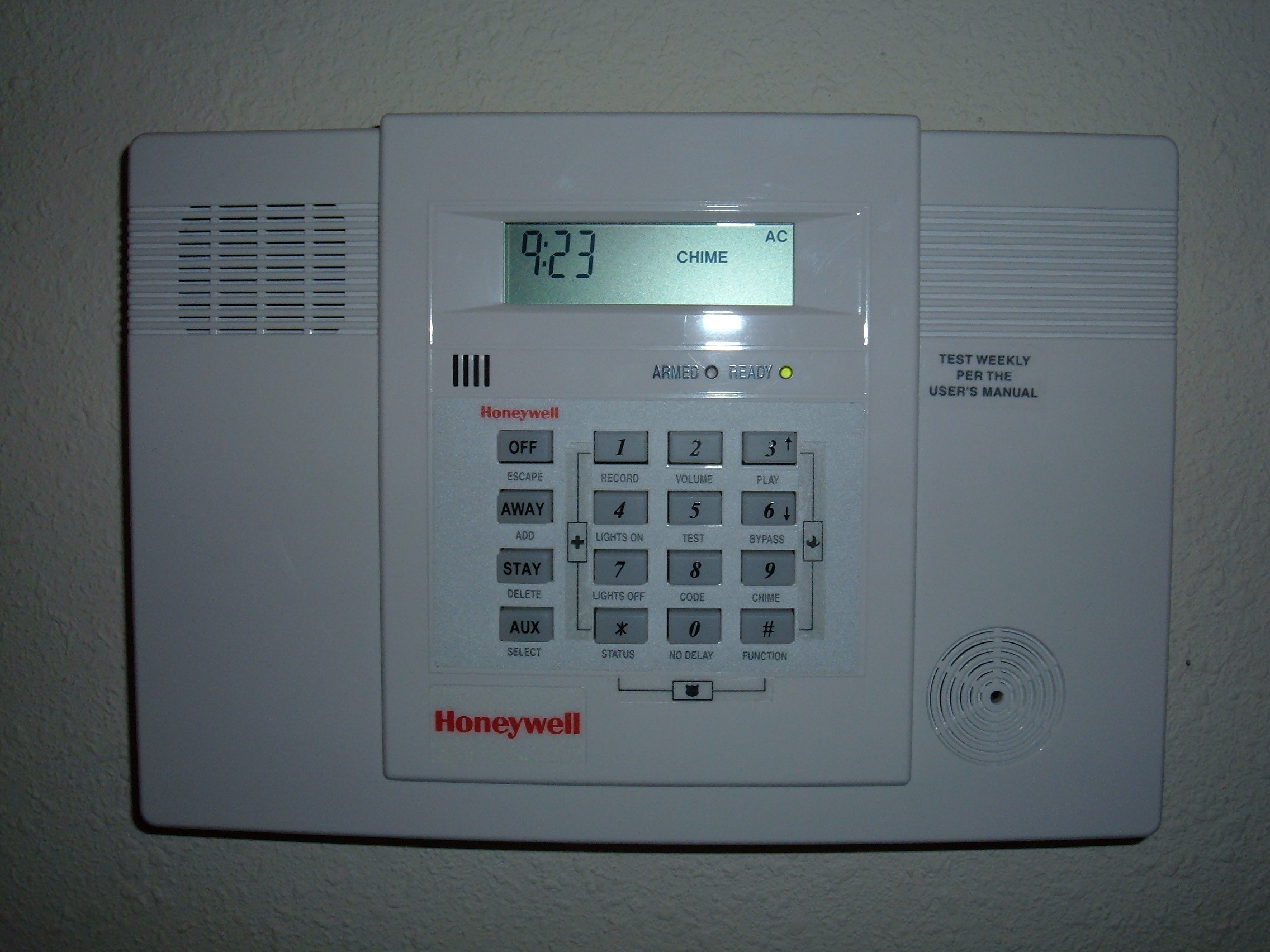
Wireless home alarm system control panel

== See also ==
- Control stand
- Dashboard
- Electric switchboard
- Fire alarm control panel
- Front panel
- Graphical user interface
  - Control panel (computer)
  - Dashboard (software) virtual
- Lighting control console
- Mixing console
- Patch board
- Plugboard
- Telephone switchboard
