= AFM7 =

Swedish passenger train car

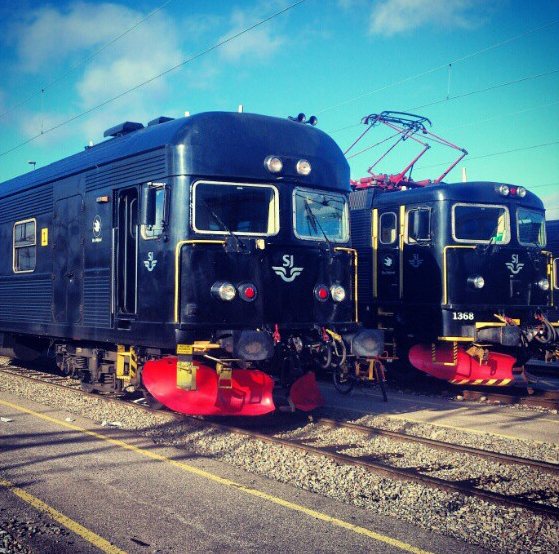
- AFM7 at Hagalund 2012. The similarities between the AFM7 and the Rc6 are clearly visible.
- In service: 1988–present
- Constructed: 1988
- Entered service: 1988
- Number built: 3
- Number in service: 3
- Capacity: 41 1st class seats
- Operator: SJ

Specifications
- Maximum speed: 160 km/h (100 mph)
- Bogies: MD-S
- Track gauge: 1,435 mm (4 ft 8 1/2 in) standard gauge

AFM7 is a Swedish passenger train car made by combining SJs 1980s-car with the drivers cab from the Rc5 locomotive and thus making it a control car.

== History ==
Only three control cars of the type were made in 1988, they received the numbers 5543–5545. In the beginning the type was used on the Uppsalapendeln during the late 1980s and early 1990s. In the early 2000s, the type was used in Skåne in south of Sweden, but today it is once again used on the Uppsalapendeln, as it is one of the few lines left in Sweden that still run loco-hauled trains in regional traffic, particularly after the introduction of the ER1 trains in 2020-2021 on regional lines in the Mälaren Valley.

The original designation for the type was UA7R, but since the "U" is indicating that the type is a DMU or EMU, it was changed to AF7x and then changed again to the current designation AFM7.

Since the AFM7 does not have its own engine, it needs an Rc6 locomotive in order to be able to use the drivers cab. The type features the same ATC system as the Rc locomotives. The passenger section of the type features first class seating as well as a storage space for luggage between the passenger compartment and the drivers cab.

The type was modernised as a part of SJs modernisation program for the 1980s-cars. The AFM7s are currently featuring the regular black SJ livery, and features the overall current SJ design, it also features 230 V electrical outlets by the seats.

The AFM7 is also equipped with MD-S bogies, featuring disc brakes. This makes the cars more silent and stop smoother.

Since 2016, the type is not used as a control car anymore and is instead used as a regular 1st class car in push pull configuration, with one Rc6 in each end of the train.
