= IC 2000 =

Swiss double-deck passenger trainset

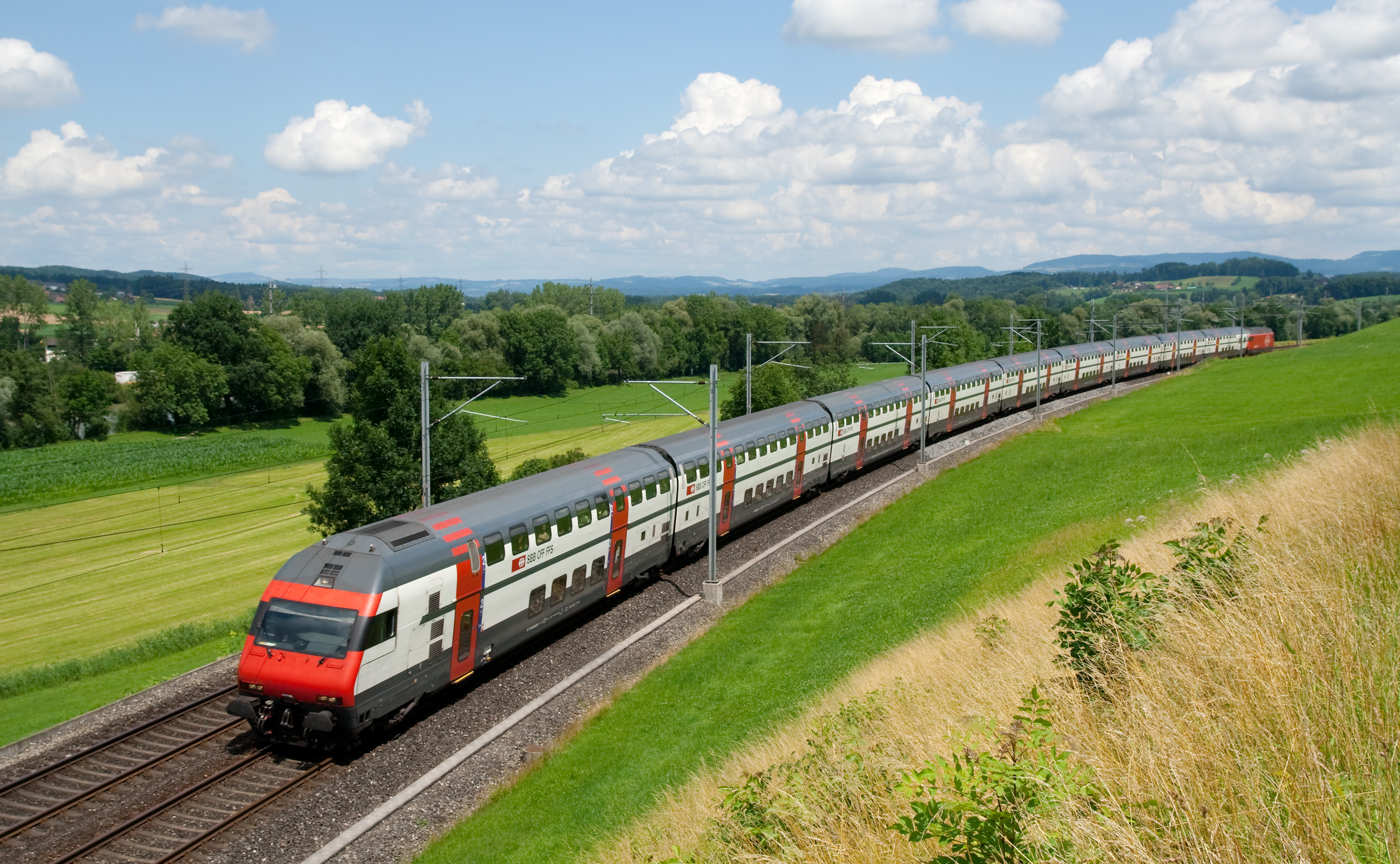
IC2000 Zurich - Lucerne with the control car leading the train

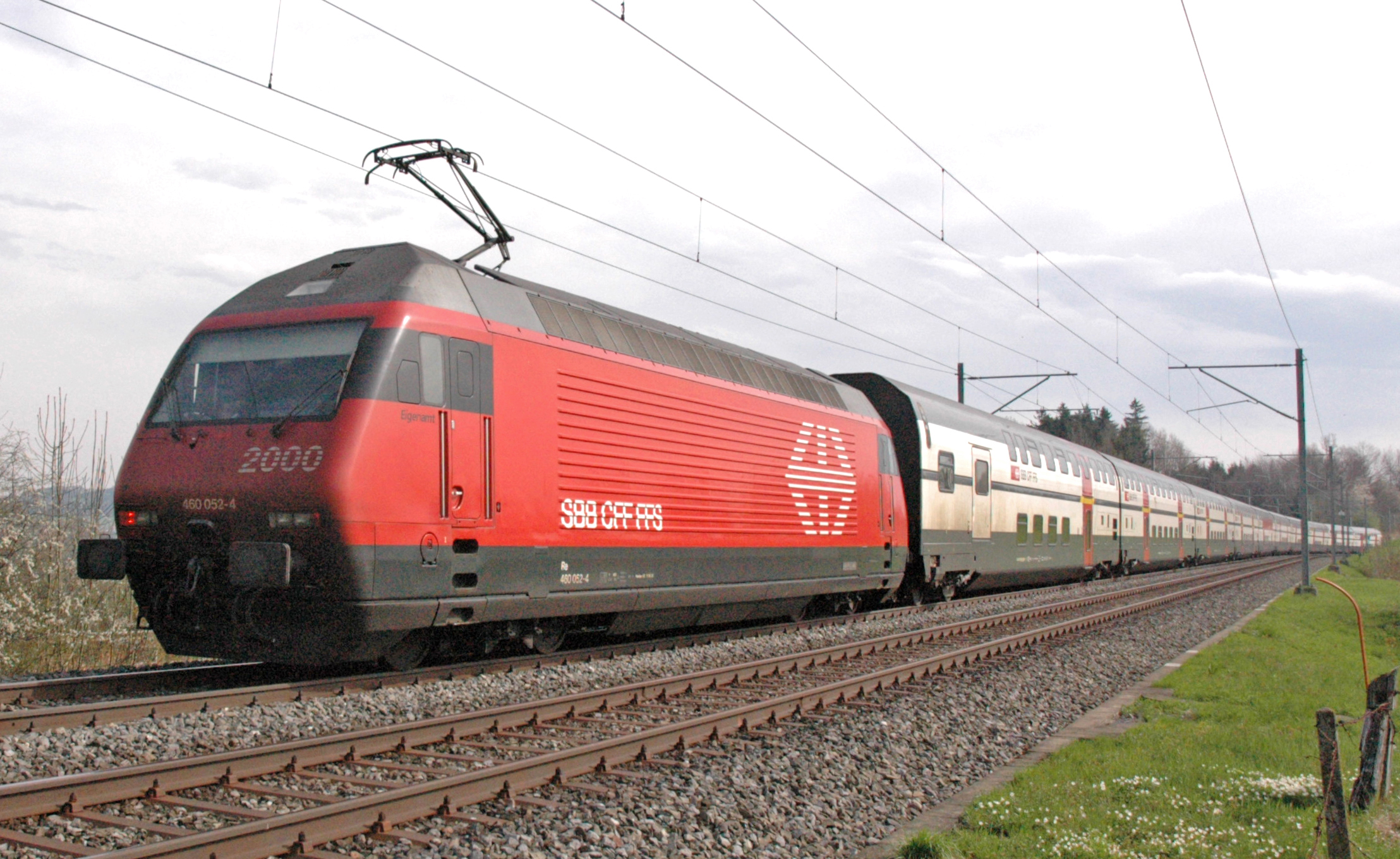
IC 2000 double-deck train hauled by Re 460

The IC 2000 is a double-deck push-pull train in Switzerland and is run by Swiss Federal Railways (SBB-CFF-FFS) as part of its InterCity service. Top speed is 200 km/h. The train set can be composed of up to 10 coaches and provides close to 1,000 seats, according to SBB. In 1997-2004, the consortium, made up of Schindler Waggon, Pratteln (later Bombardier Transportation Switzerland) and Alstom delivered 341 coaches to SBB, of which about 320 coaches are still in use as of December 2009.

== Overview ==
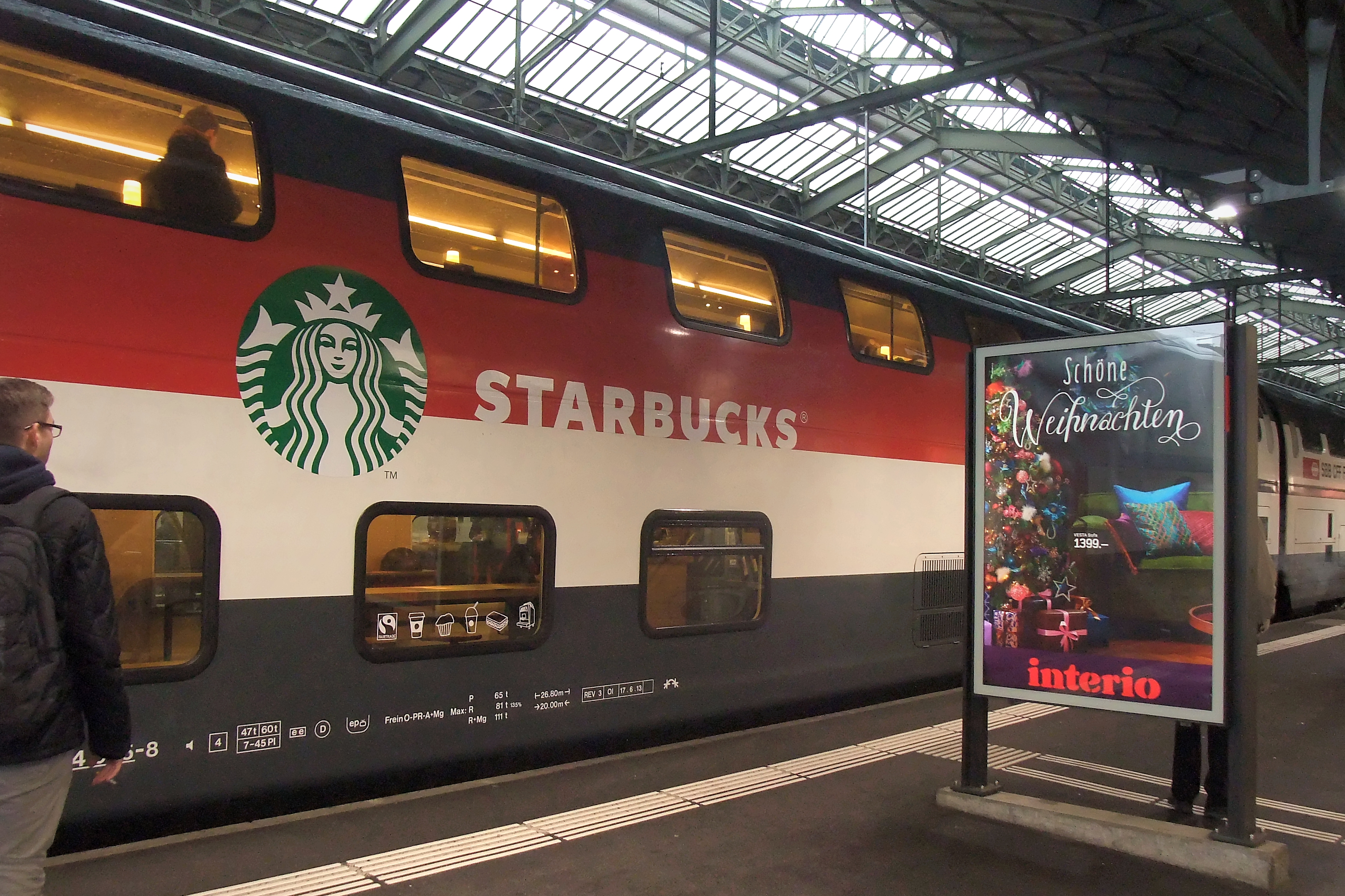
A Starbucks café coach in November 2013

IC 2000 was the first double-deck train in use on a nationwide scale. Previously, most, if not all, double-deck trains, belonged to the Zürich S-Bahn network.

The IC 2000 typically has a dining or a bistro car, and a snacks trolley service on the upper level throughout the train set. Both the first and second class coaches feature luggage racks on both decks; in addition, small suitcases can be stored under the seats. In November 2013, the first Starbucks café coaches on SBB-CFF-FFS were launched using two refurbished IC 2000 dining cars, used on a 9-month trial basis on the St. Gallen – Geneva route.

The driving trailer at the beginning or at the end of the train is either a family coach with a special play area on the upper level or has a family zone, also on the upper level. In either case, there is space on the lower deck of the driving trailer for pushchairs, bicycles, and skis. Trains with family coaches are marked FA in the timetables.

75 first class coaches are equipped with power sockets for charging laptops etc. Trains with such business zones are marked BZ in the timetables and the coaches themselves can be identified by a laptop icon. On certain routes, passengers are able to use mobile broadband internet access for an additional fee. The business zone coaches can be typically found behind the locomotive.

The usage of the IC 2000 is now very commonplace in Switzerland. Its "cowlike" black-and-white design, and red doors, make it instantly recognisable. The train exterior was designed by Pininfarina, to match the style of the Re 460 locomotive used with the trainset.

Due to the frequent use of mobile phones, in December 2008, SBB introduced "quiet zones" in both classes, where "conversation and discussion, even if conducted quietly; listening to music or the radio, even using headphones; using audio and video applications on laptops; and using mobile phones" are prohibited. However, after one year quiet zones have been restricted to some first class coaches only.

== IC 2020 Project ==
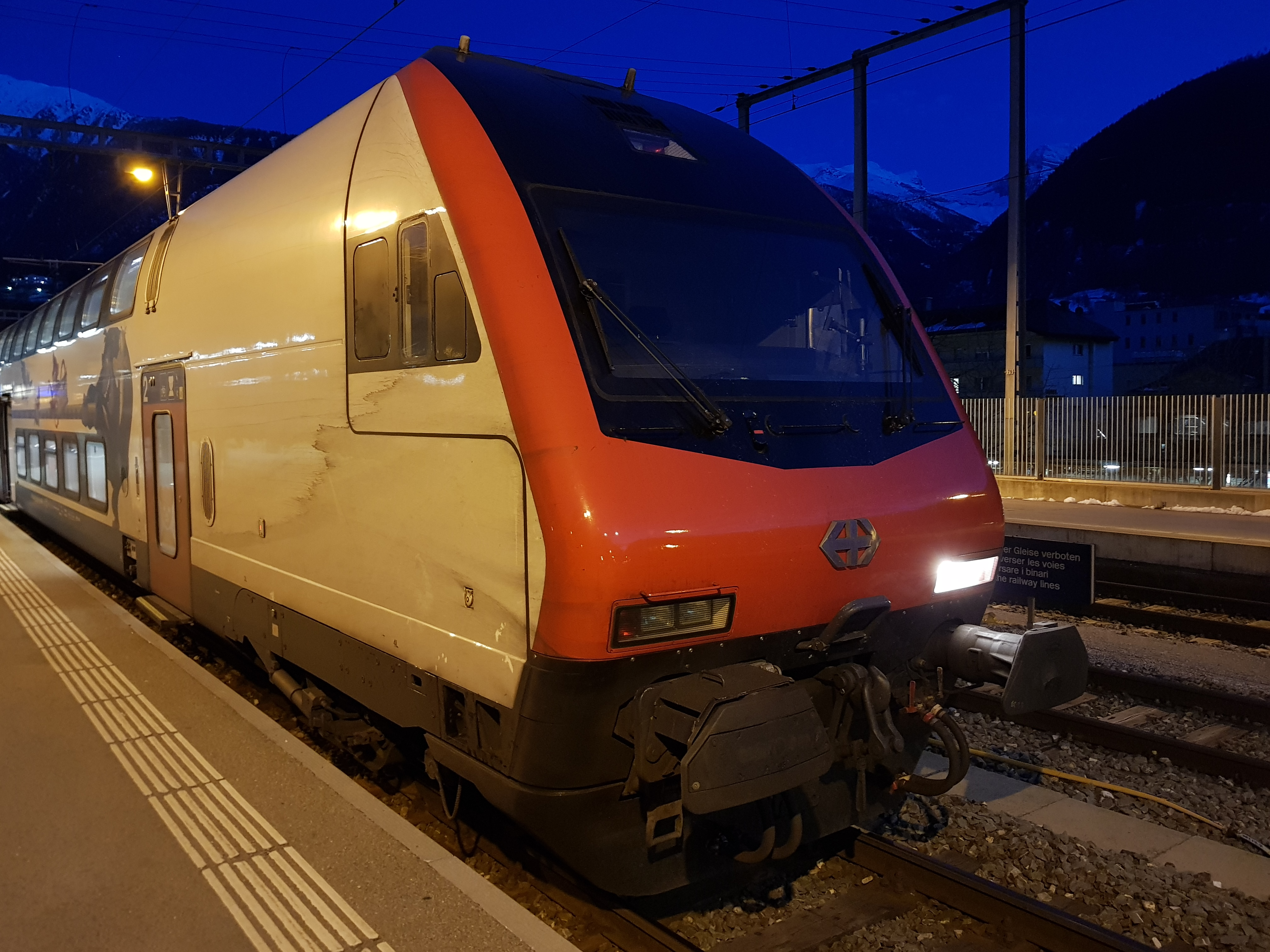
A refurbished IC 2020 cab car, spotted at Brig station

In December 2016, Swiss Federal Railways initiated its largest train refurbishment project to date. The entire IC 2000 fleet (a total of 341 coaches) will be refurbished by the end of 2024 at SBB's Olten facility. The refurbished coaches are expected to operate until 2043, combined with refurbished Re 460 locomotives that are being rebuilt in SBB's Yverdon-les-Bains facility. After the renovation, the coaches will be rebranded as IC 2020. The refreshed livery has a different appearance compared to the original fleet: the coaches are white, with black bands across the window sections and undercarriage. A red stripe runs above the upper deck, and then covers the front section of the driving car. The refurbished coaches also have a new interior design. In contrast to dark tones of the original design, the refurbished interior has brighter tones and materials. 40 first class coaches will include conference tables for business meetings, replacing standard 4/2 person compartments.

== Operated Routes ==
- IC1: Genève-Aéroport - Bern - Zürich HB - St. Gallen (partly)
- IC6: Basel SBB - Bern - Brig (partly)
- IC8: Romanshorn - Bern - Brig
- IC61: Basel SBB - Bern - Interlaken Ost (partly)
- IR15: Lucerne - Bern - Lausanne - Genève-Aéroport (partly)
- IR16: Bern - Olten - Brugg AG - Zürich HB (partly)
- IR27: Basel SBB - Olten - Lucerne (partly)
- IR75: Konstanz - Zürich HB - Lucerne (partly)
- IR90: Brig - Lausanne - Genève-Aéroport (partly)
