= Control stand =

Diesel-electric locomotive subsystem which integrates engine functional controls

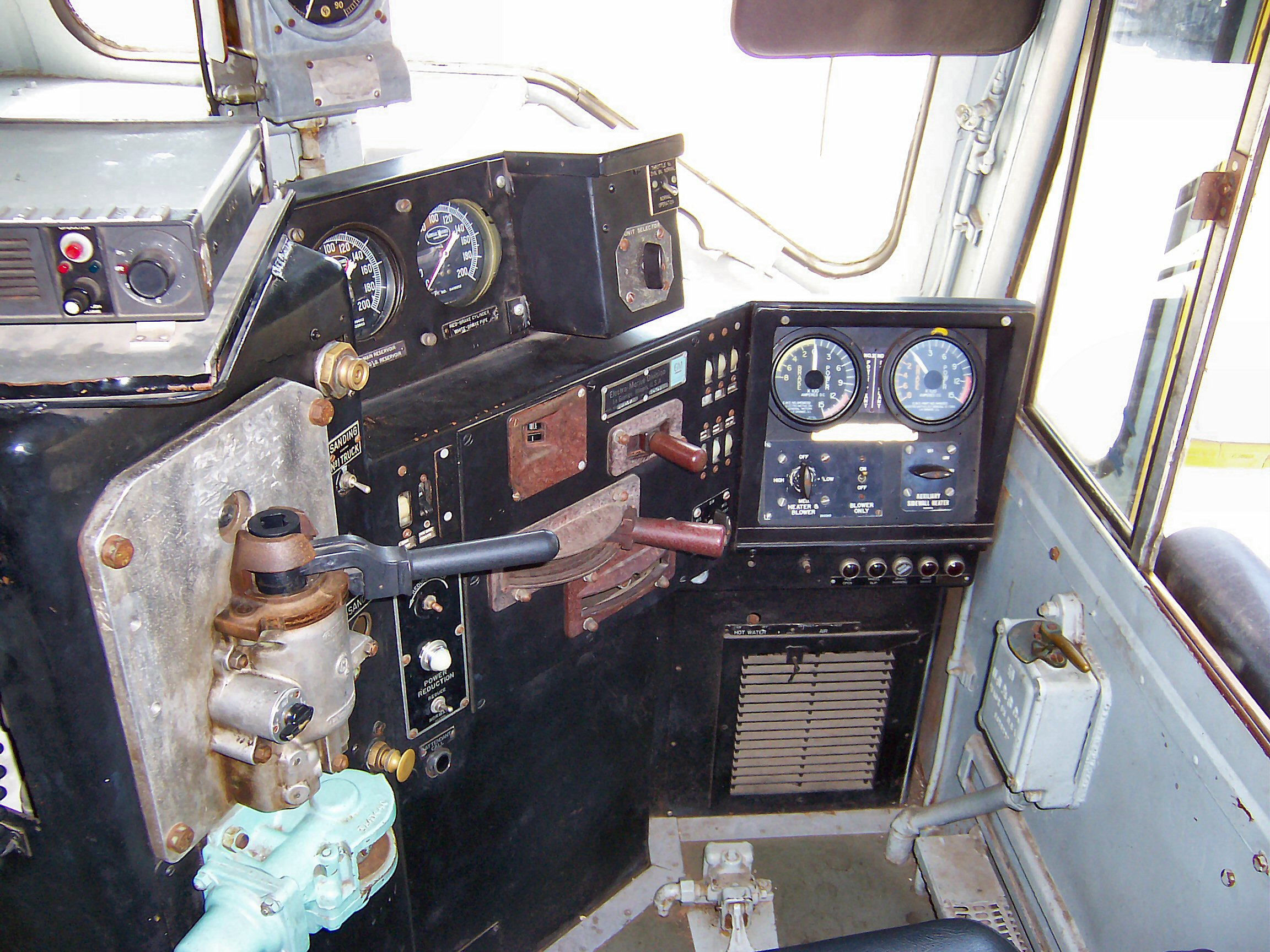
AAR control stand on an EMD DDA40X; Other EMD models are similar.

A control stand is a locomotive subsystem which integrates engine functional controls and brake functional controls, whereby all functional controls are "at hand" (within reach of the locomotive engineer from their customary seating position, facing forward at all times). The control stand can be on either the left or right hand side of the cab, depending on region.

Normally, a control stand is oriented in the direction labeled "F" (front of the locomotive). Although front is usually the "short hood," a seldom-used alternate designates the "long hood" as front, such as on the Victorian Railways X class. Where operations in both directions are required, two control stands ("dual control stands") may be provided.

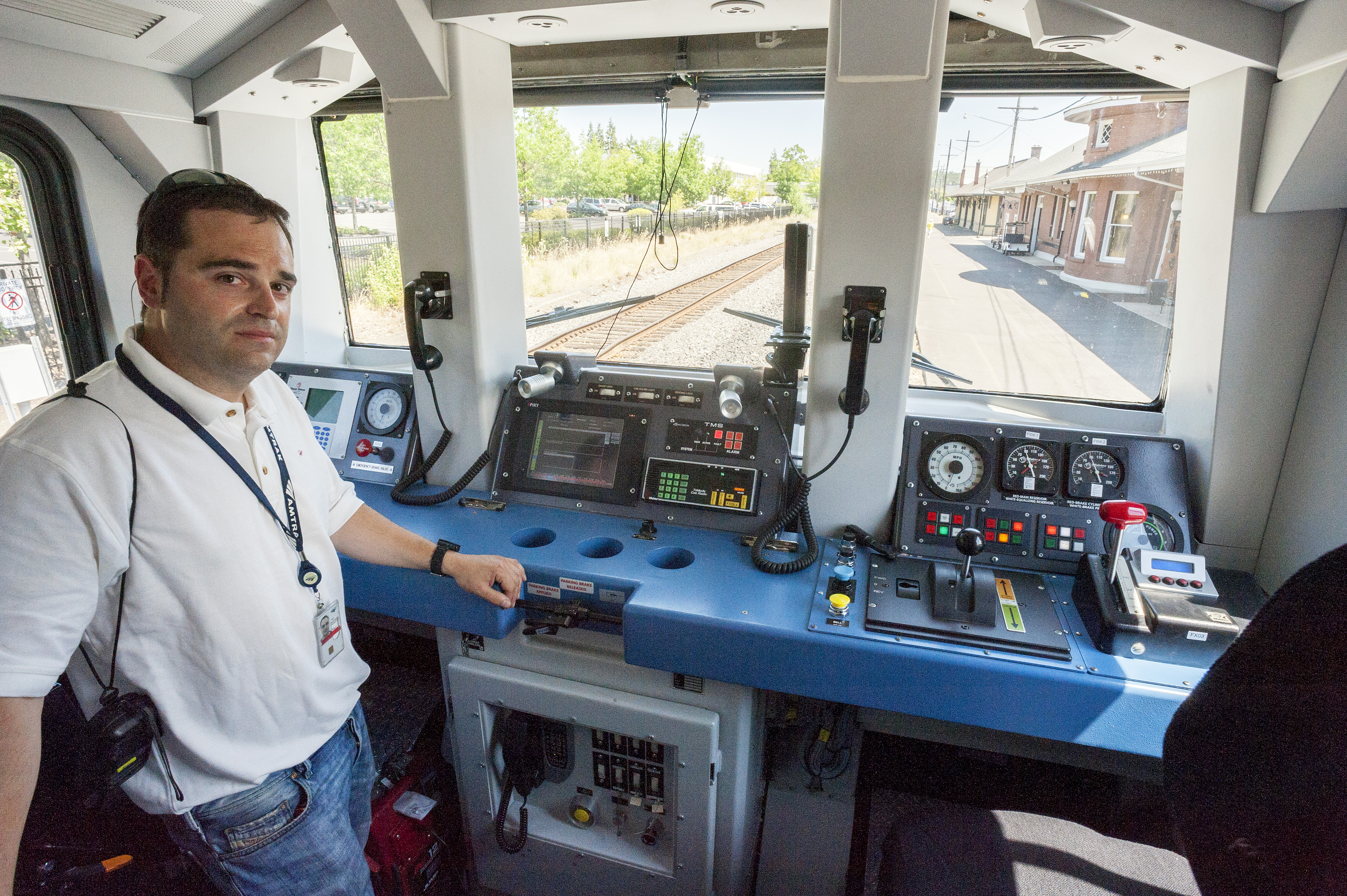
The control desk of an Amtrak Cascades Talgo Series 8 cab car

The early control stands were designed to Association of American Railroads (AAR) standards. The traditional AAR control stand is still preferred by some railroads. Current control stands may employ multiple displays and electronic actuation of operational controls from an all-electronic desktop.

== See also ==
- Cab (locomotive)
- Control car
- Control panel (engineering)
- Dashboard
- Driving Van Trailer
- Flight instruments
- Märklin Digital
