= Control car =

Unpowered railway or tramway car with a driver's cab

A control car (also known by a variety of other terms – see below) is a non-powered rail vehicle from which a train can be operated. As dedicated vehicles or regular passenger cars, they have one or two driver compartments with all the controls and gauges required to remotely operate the locomotive, including exterior locomotive equipment such as horns, bells, ploughs, and lights. They also have communications and safety systems such as GSM-R or European Train Control System (ETCS). Control cars enable push-pull operation when located on the end of a train opposite its locomotive by allowing the train to reverse direction at a terminus without moving the locomotive or turning the train around.

Control cars can carry passengers, baggage, and mail, and may, when used together with diesel locomotives, contain an engine-generator set to provide head-end power (HEP). They can also be used with a power car or a railcar.

European railways have used control cars since the 1920s; they first appeared in the United States in the 1960s.

Control cars communicate with the locomotive via cables that are jumped between cars. North America and Ireland use a standard AAR 27-wire multiple unit cable, while other countries use cables with up to 61 wires. A more recent method is to control the train through a Time-Division Multiplexed (TDM) connection, which usually works with two protected wires.

== Other terms ==
Other English-language terms for a control car include:

North America:

- Cab car
- Cab control unit
- Non-Powered Control Unit (used by Amtrak for converted locomotives)

UK, Ireland, Australia and India:

- Control trailer
- Driving trailer

== North America ==
In North America, cab cars are used primarily for commuter rail and, less frequently, for longer distance trains. There are both single and bilevel models; styling ranges from blunt ends to newer, more aerodynamic, streamlined cabs. They may be very similar to regular coaches, to the point of including a gangway between cars so that they could be used in the middle of a passenger train like a regular coach if necessary.

The Chicago and North Western Railway had 42 control cabs built by Pullman-Standard in 1960, which eliminated the need for its trains or locomotives to be turned around. It was an outgrowth of multiple-unit operation that was already common on diesel locomotives of the time. The Canadian transit agency Exo uses control cars on all its trains. Amtrak also has a number of ex-Budd Metroliner cab cars, which are used primarily for push pull services on the Keystone Service and Amtrak Hartford Line. The Long Island Rail Road uses cab cars on its C3 double deck coaches.

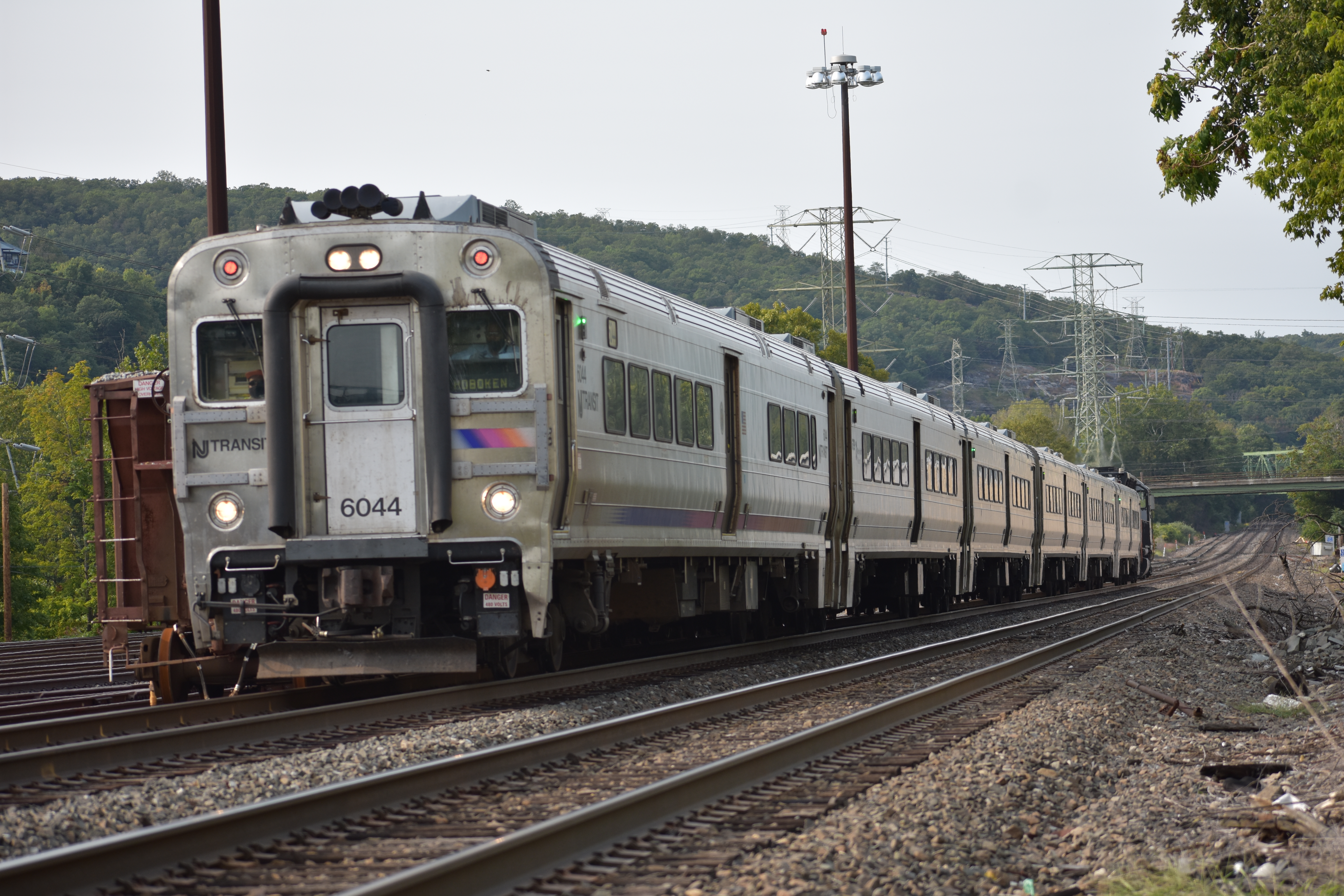
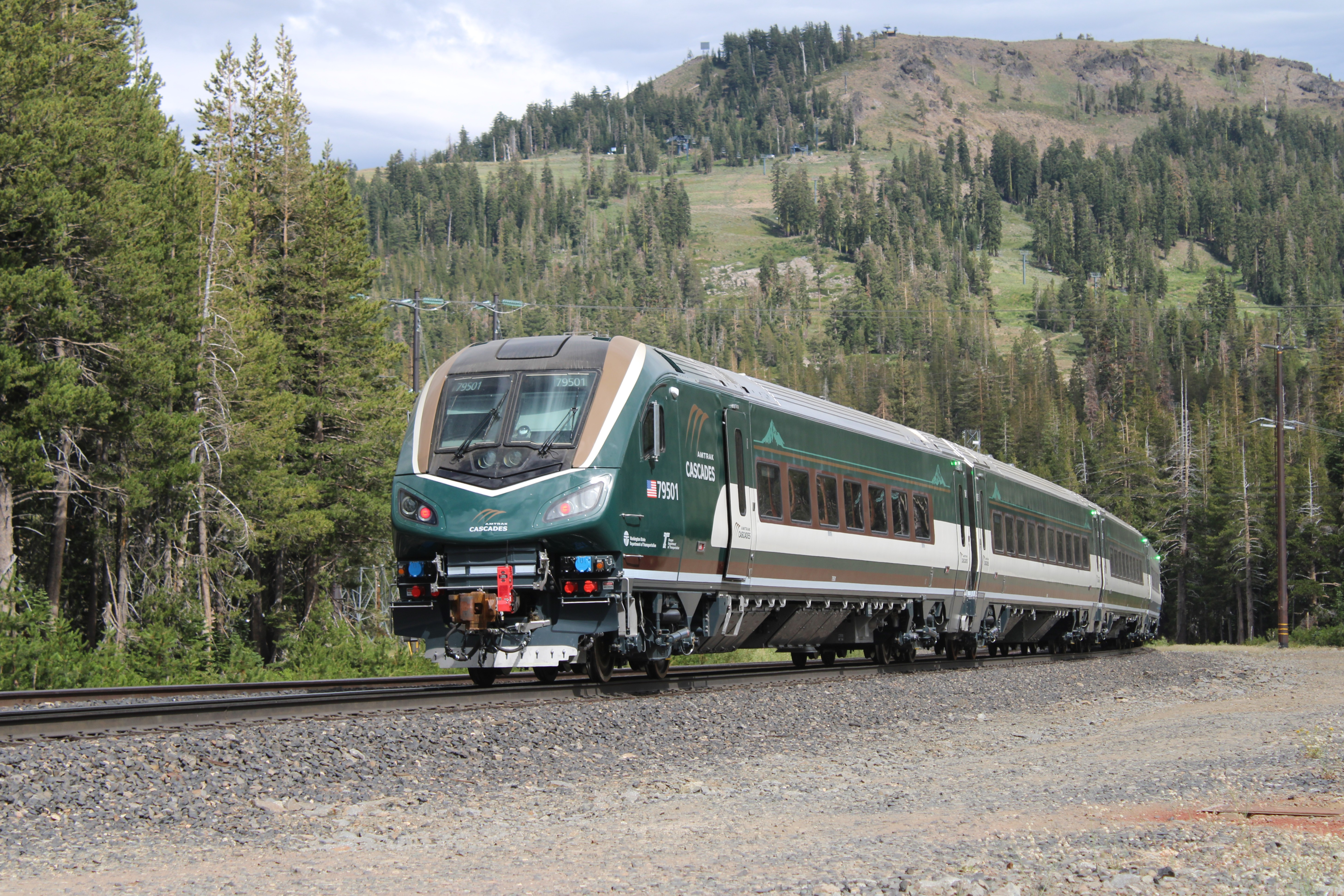
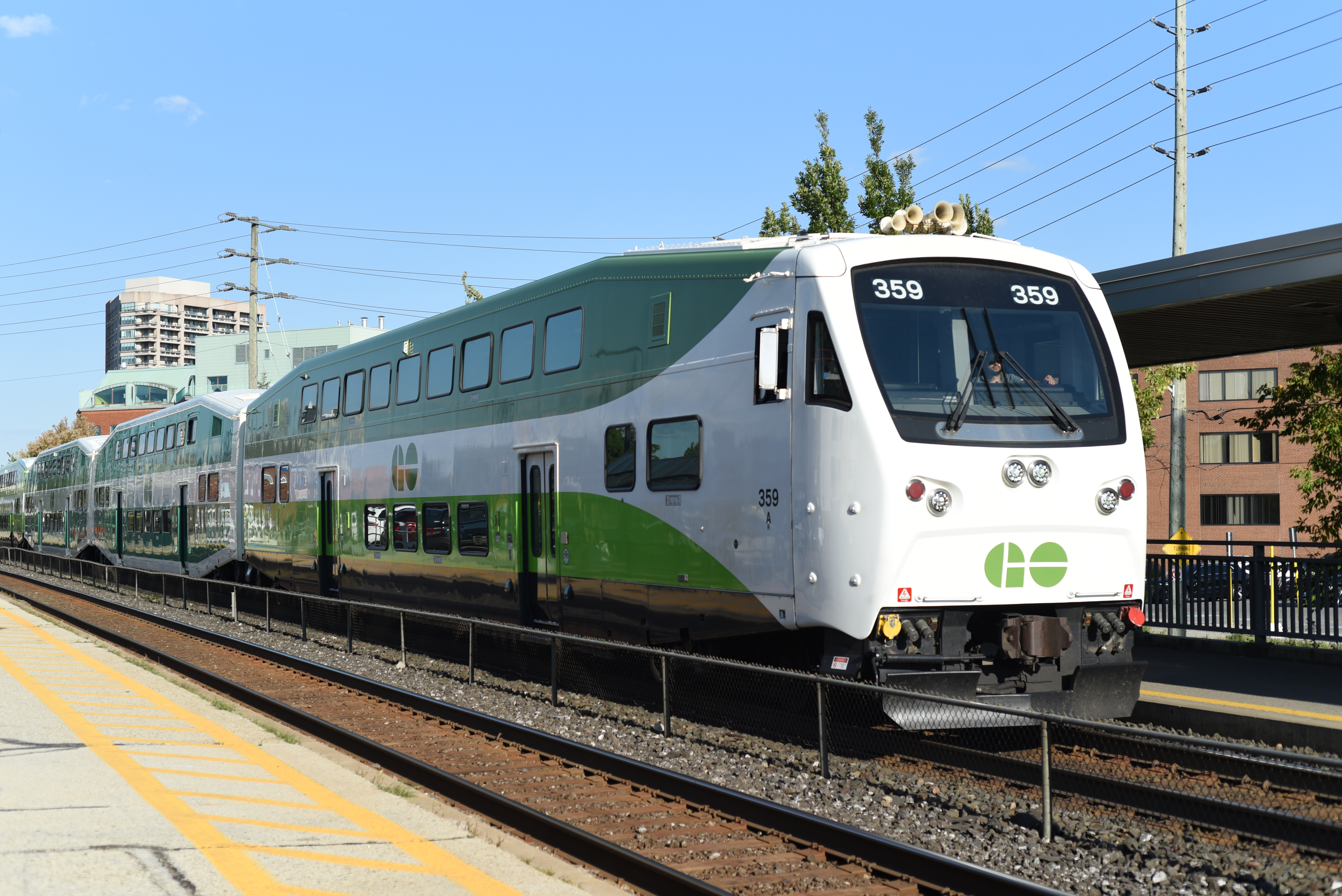
North American cab cars; showing single level (left) and bilevel (right) designs, as well as streamlined (bottom) and walk-through (top) designs

During the mid-1990s, as push-pull operations became more common in the United States, cab-cars came under criticism for providing less protection to engine crews during level crossing accidents. This has been addressed by providing additional reinforcing in cab cars. This criticism became stronger after the 2005 Glendale train crash, in which a Metrolink collided with a Jeep Grand Cherokee at a level crossing in California. The train was traveling with its cab car in the front, and the train jackknifed. Eleven people were killed in the accident, and about 180 were injured. Ten years later, in early 2015, another collision occurred in Oxnard, California, involving one of Metrolink's improved "Rotem" cab cars at the front of the train hitting a truck at a crossing. The truck driver left his vehicle before the impact, but the collision resulted in multiple car derailments and further cars jackknifing causing widespread injury.

=== Converted locomotives ===
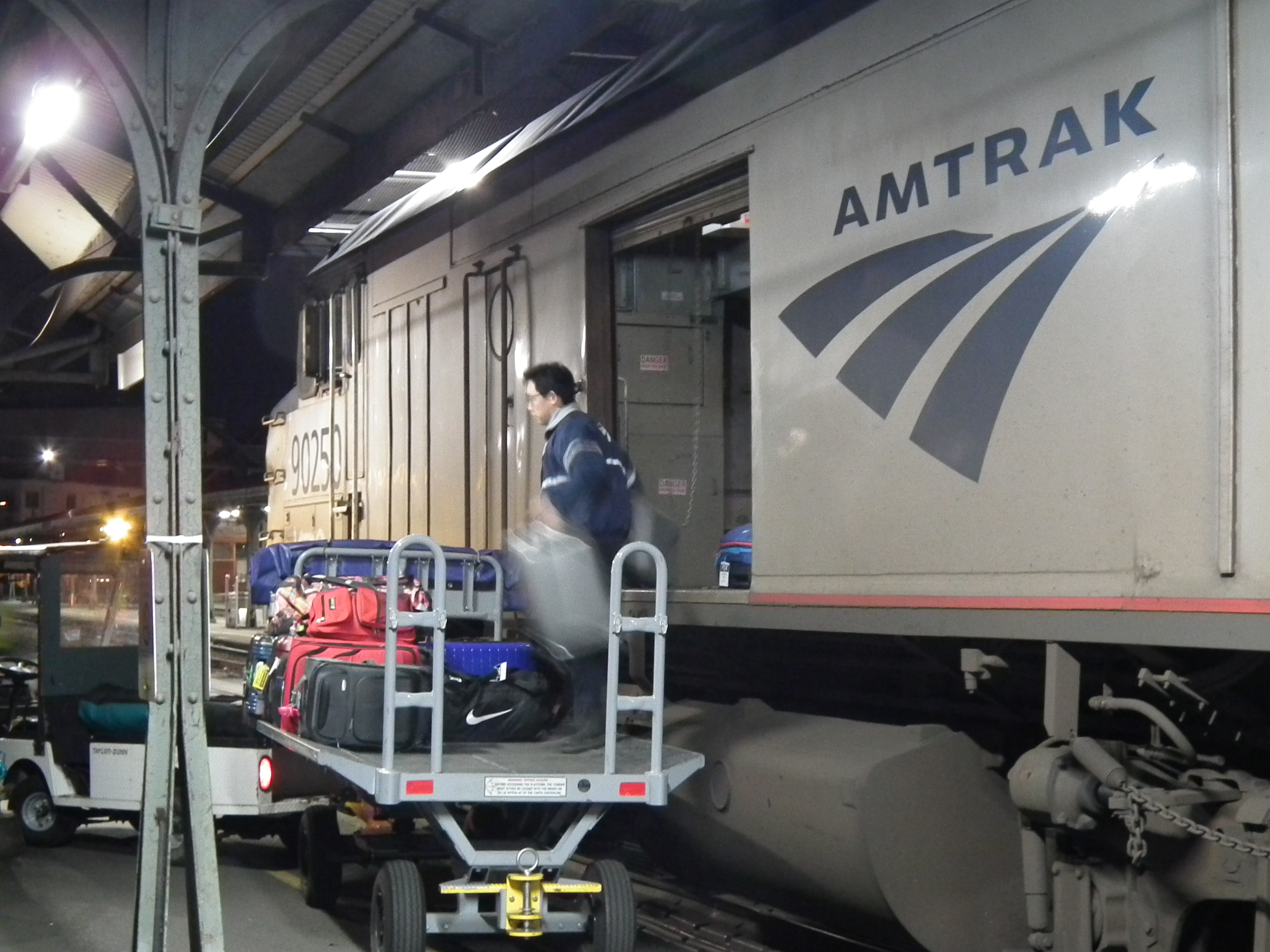
Amtrak employee unloading bags from converted "cabbage" car 90250 (formerly F40PHR 250)

From the 1970s until 1999, the Long Island Rail Road used a number of older locomotives converted to "power packs". The original prime movers were replaced with 600 horsepower (450 kW) engines/generators solely for supplying HEP with the engineer's control stand left intact. Locomotives converted included eight and ten Alco FA-1s and FA-2s, four EMD F7s, and one F9. One FA was further converted into a power car for the C1 bi-level cars in 1991. The railroad has since switched to classic cab cars with a DE30AC/DM30AC locomotive on some trains. Trains going into Penn Station require two DM30AC locomotives on each end in order to make use of their 3rd rail pickups.

Until the 1980s, Ontario's GO Transit had a similar Auxiliary Power Unit (APU) program for twelve EMD FP7s. They were frequently used with GP40-2Ws and GP40M-2s, which lacked HEP to power trains. They also found use with HEP-equipped GP40TCs and F40PHs, and were sometimes leased to other railroads. They were eventually retired in 1995 upon the arrival of the EMD F59PHs and subsequently scrapped, except for one F7A and one F7B, which were sold to Tri-Rail and the Ontario Northland Railway, respectively.

MARC had a former F7 unit, #7100, also converted into an APCU, or All-Purpose Control Unit, which occasionally substituted for a cab car. It was rebuilt with a HEP generator, newer cab controls, and fitted with a Nathan Airchime K5LA. It was used up until the late 2000s, and was donated to the National Museum of Railroad History & Innovation in 2010.

Amtrak developed their Non-powered Control Unit (NPCU) by removing the prime mover, main alternator, and traction motors from surplus EMD F40PH locomotives. The control stand was left in place, as were equipment allowing horn, bell, and headlight operation. A floor and roll-up side-doors were then installed to allow for baggage service, leading to the nickname "cab-baggage cars" or "cabbages".

Six NPCUs rebuilt for Cascades service in the Pacific Northwest do not have the roll-up side doors, because the Talgo VI sets on which they operated had a baggage car as part of the trainset. In addition, all Cascades NPCUs, except for #90340, were retrofitted with side skirts similar to the now-retired F59PHI fleet. However, #90230, #90250, and #90251 were later fitted with the roll-up side doors. Additionally, #90250 was repainted into Phase V livery and had its side skirts removed. These units have since operated with standard Amtrak cars (Horizon and Amfleet) since the Talgo VI's retirement in 2020.

Four NPCUs, #90213, #90214, #90220 and #90224 are exclusively used on the Downeaster. These units have Downeaster logos applied to the front and the sides of the units.

Three NPCUs are designated for use on Amtrak California services. They are painted in a paint scheme similar to the old with blue-and-teal striped livery used by Caltrain between 1985 and 1997.

In 2011, Amtrak F40PH 406 was converted to an NPCU to enable push-pull operation of Amtrak's 40th-anniversary exhibit train; in addition a HEP generator was installed to supply auxiliary electricity. Unlike other NPCUs, the 406 resembles an operational F40PH externally and initially retained its original number. In 2024, it was renumbered to 90406 to avoid duplicate numbering with the ALC-42s.

In 2017, NCDOT started a Cab Control Unit (CCU) program using ex-GO F59PHs. Five CCUs have been ordered, numbered 101-105. These are used on the Piedmont.

In 2023, Amtrak began testing a former HHP-8 locomotive as a cab car with the aim of supplementing or replacing the existing ex-Metroliner cab cars until the Airo fleet arrives. As of July 2024, eight total conversions are planned.

In 2024, Amtrak started converting their GE P42DC locomotives into Non-Powered Control Units, starting with Amtrak P42DC #184 (the original Phase IV heritage unit), which is now Amtrak P42C #9700. Unlike the F40PH NPCUs, the P42Cs retain most of their internal components for weight purposes.

== Europe ==
There are many examples of this type of vehicle in operation in Europe.

=== Austria ===
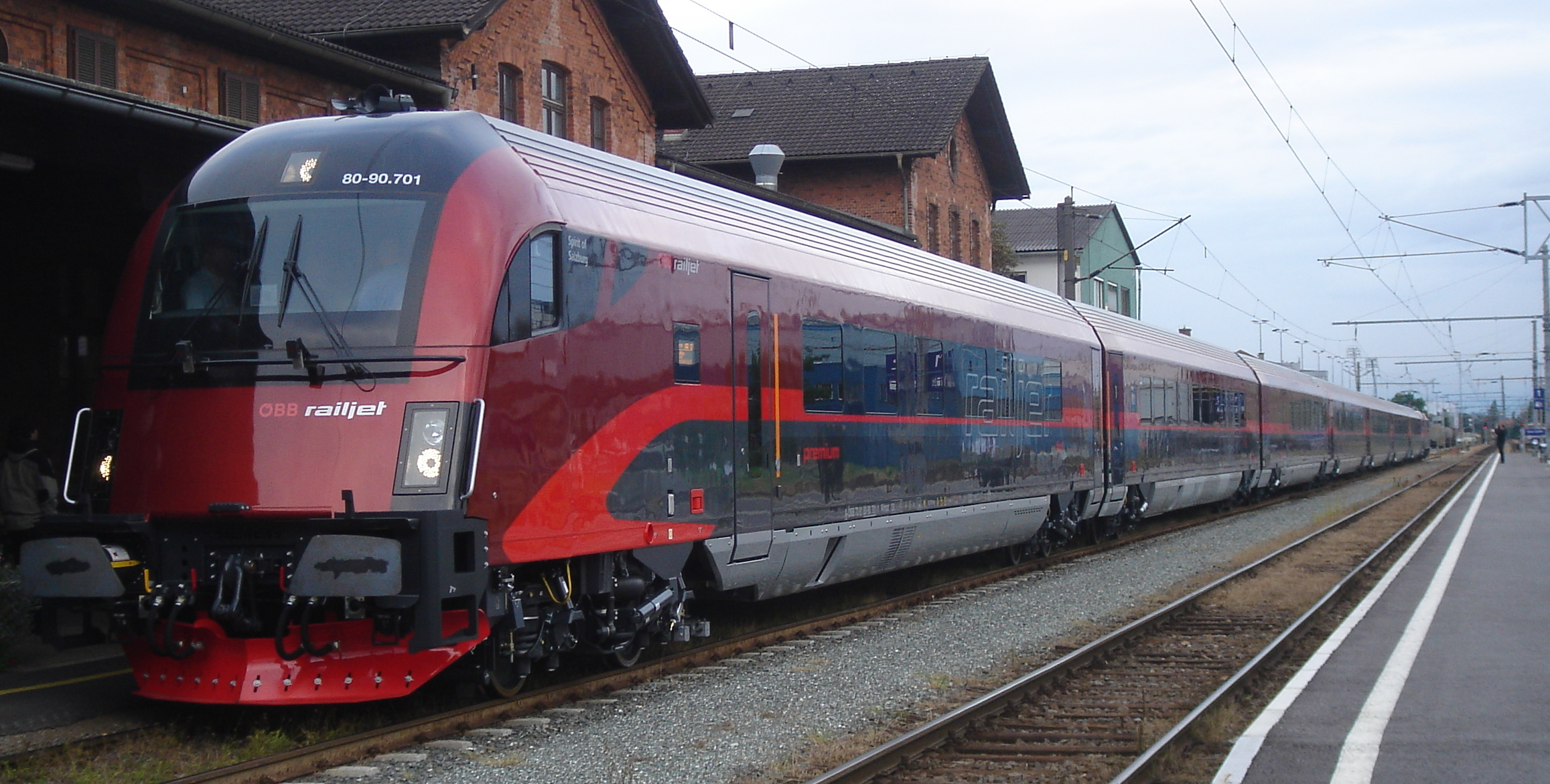
ÖBB Railjet Steuerwagen

Push-pull trains with cab cars on one end operate extensively on ÖBB Railjet services using Siemens Vectouro trainsets.

=== Belarus ===
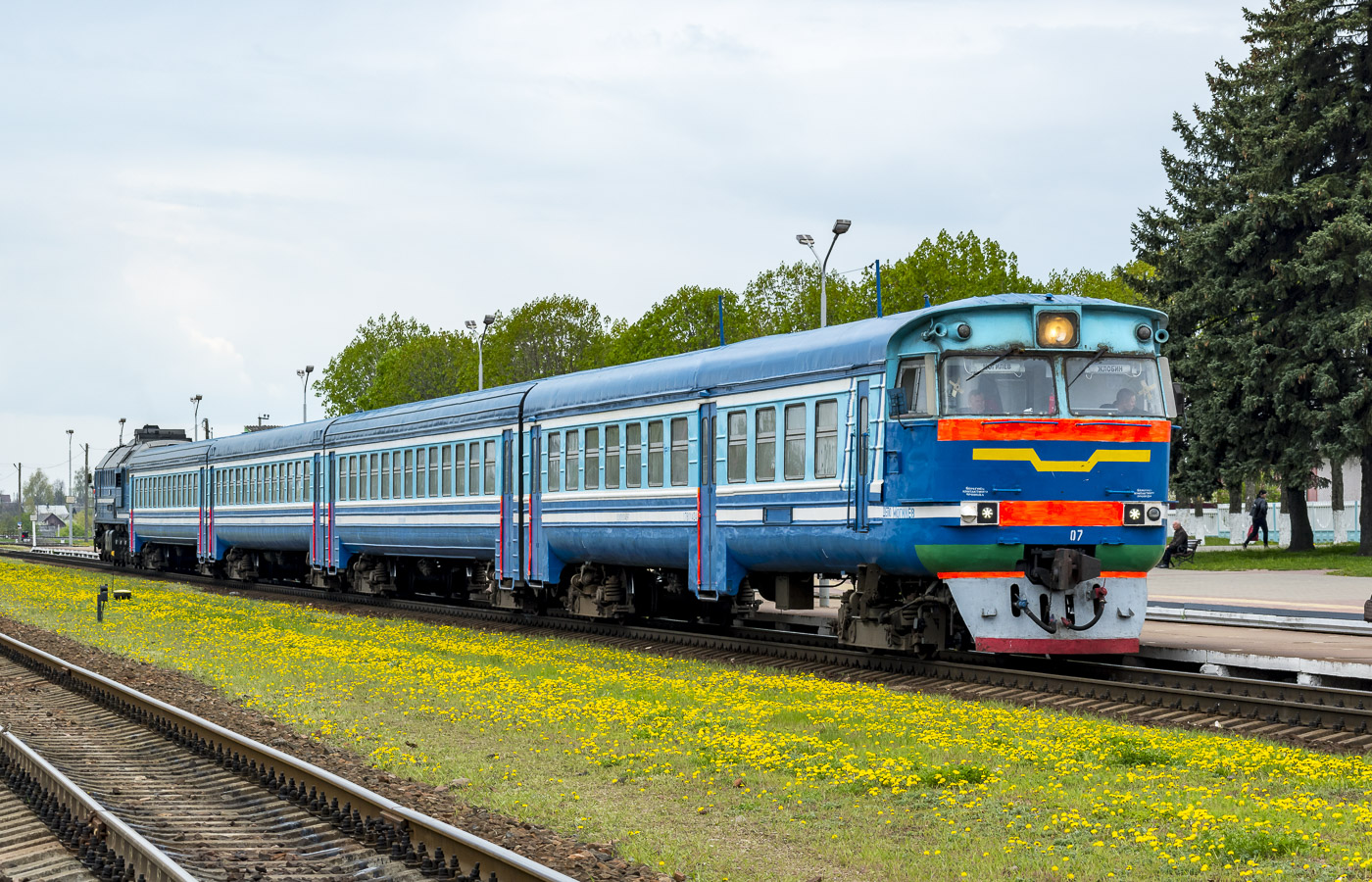
DRB1m-07 push-pull trainset with a control car, derived from an early-produced DR1 DMU

In Belarus, as part of push-pull trains, control and intermediate cars from DR1 DMUs manufactured by the Riga Machine-Building Plant (RVR) are used. After the decommissioning of power cars, some of them were converted into control cars by replacing the engine room with a passenger compartment, and at the other end of a train, one unit of 2M62 or 2M62U diesel locomotives started to use instead of another DR1 power car. Later, the control cars of DRB1 trains began to be produced by RVR initially for push-pull trains on a par with DMUs. RVR also produced DRB2 control cars for such trainsets, which a similar to control cars of the ER9 EMUs.

=== Belgium ===
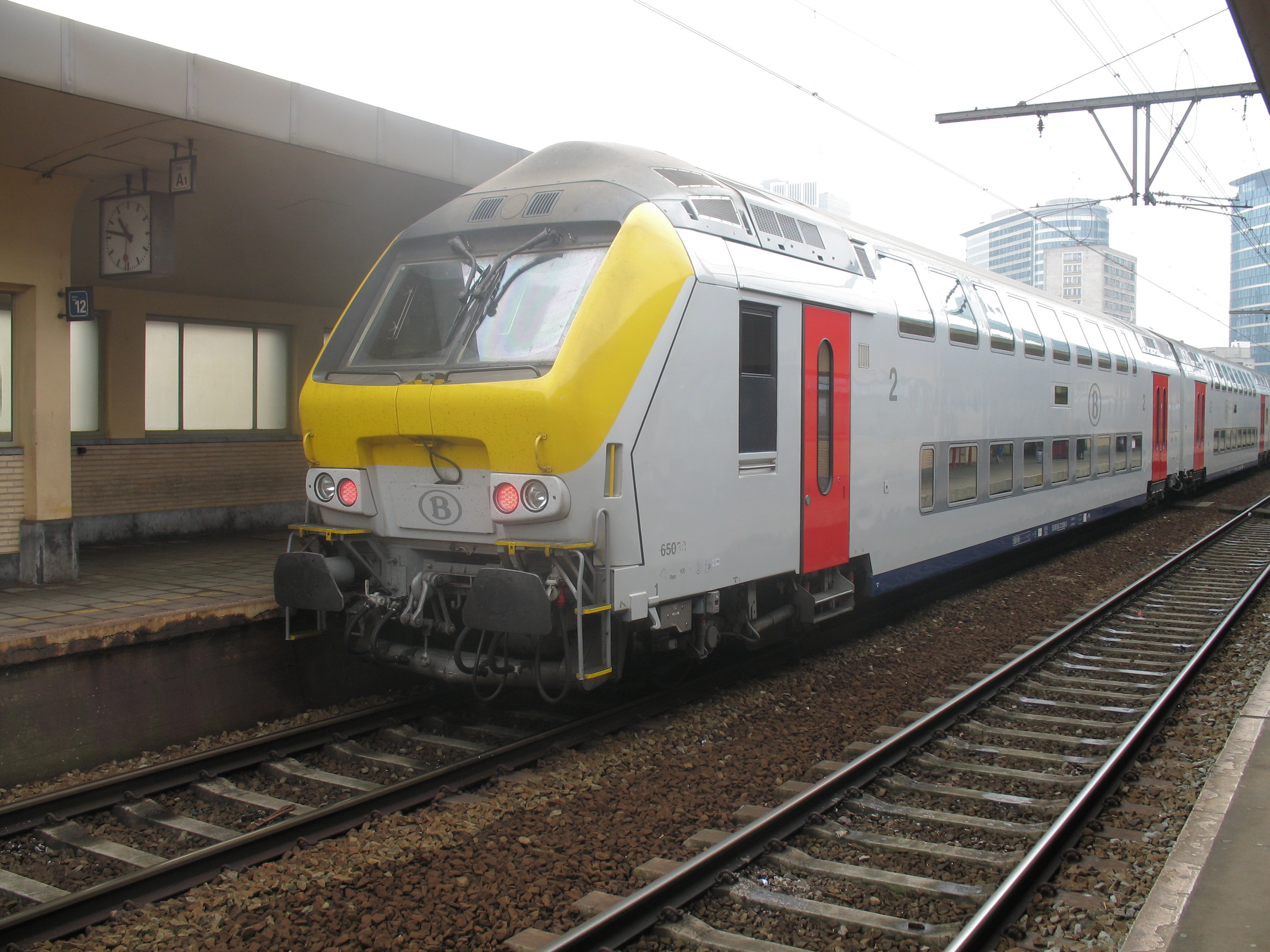
M6 double-deck driving carriage at Brussels-North railway station

NMBS/SNCB make extensive use of push-pull operation. Trains are powered by class 21 class 27 or class 18 electric locomotives and are operated in one direction from a driving carriage.

=== Czech Republic ===
In the Czech Republic, these control cabs were hardly used in the past. The main reason was concerns about the greater tendency of trainsets that do not have a traction unit at the head of the train to derail. Earlier legislation considered such a train to be sunk and for this reason the speed of such a train was limited to 30 km/h (19 mph).

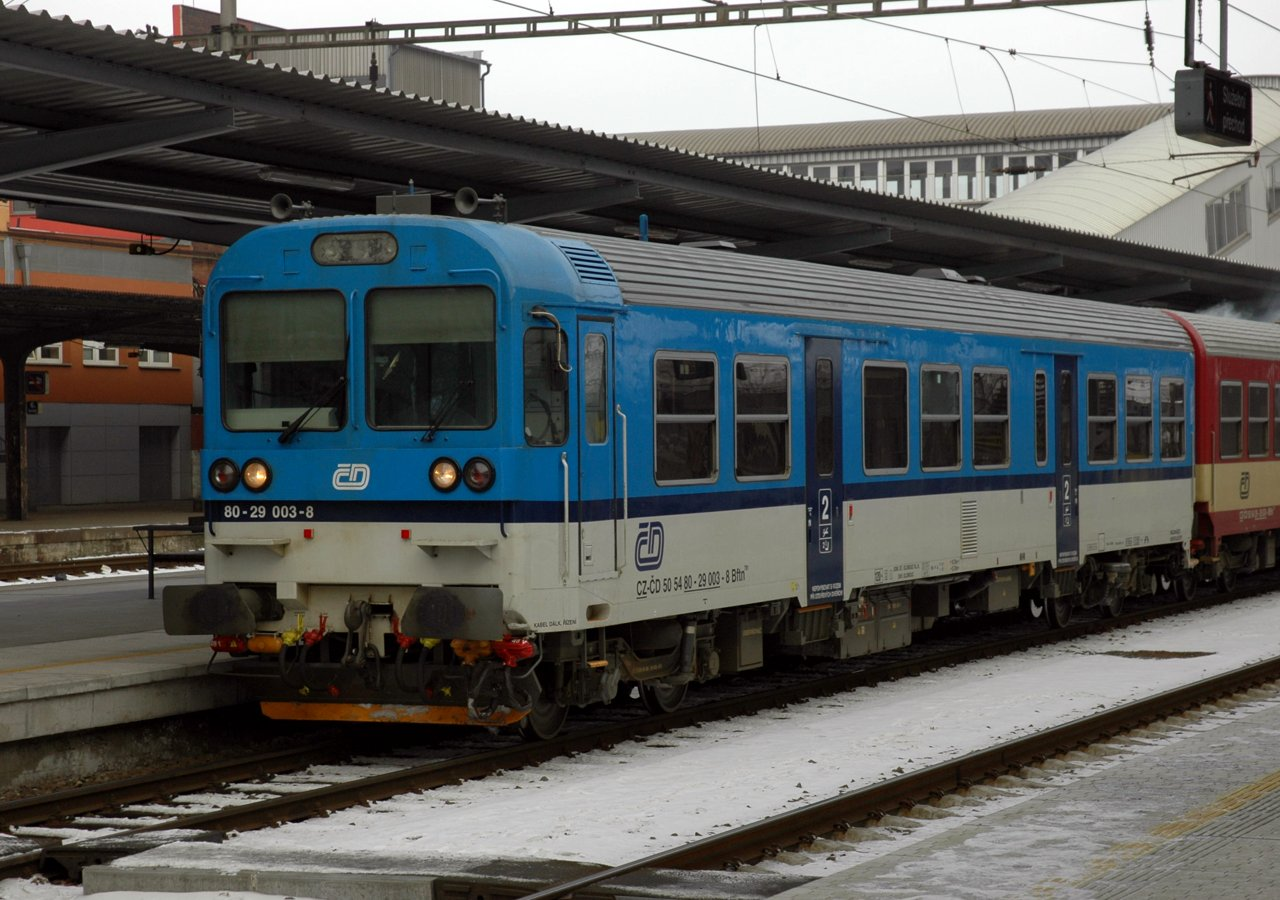
Class 943 control cab in Ostrava-Kunčice

=== Finland ===
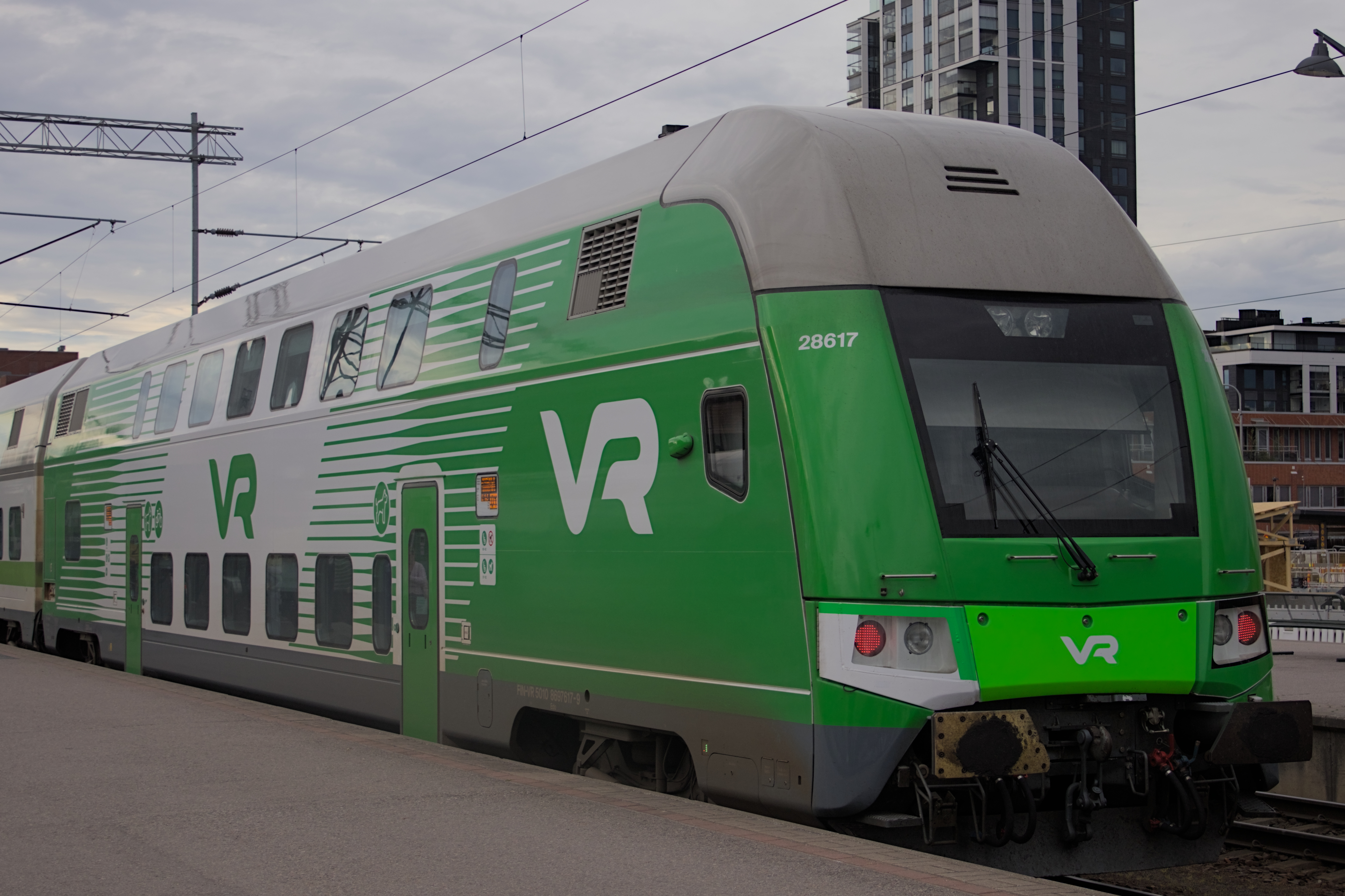
Class Edo cab car at Tampere Central Station

The VR Group fleet includes 42 cab cars (Finnish: ohjausvaunu), classified as Edo.

=== France ===
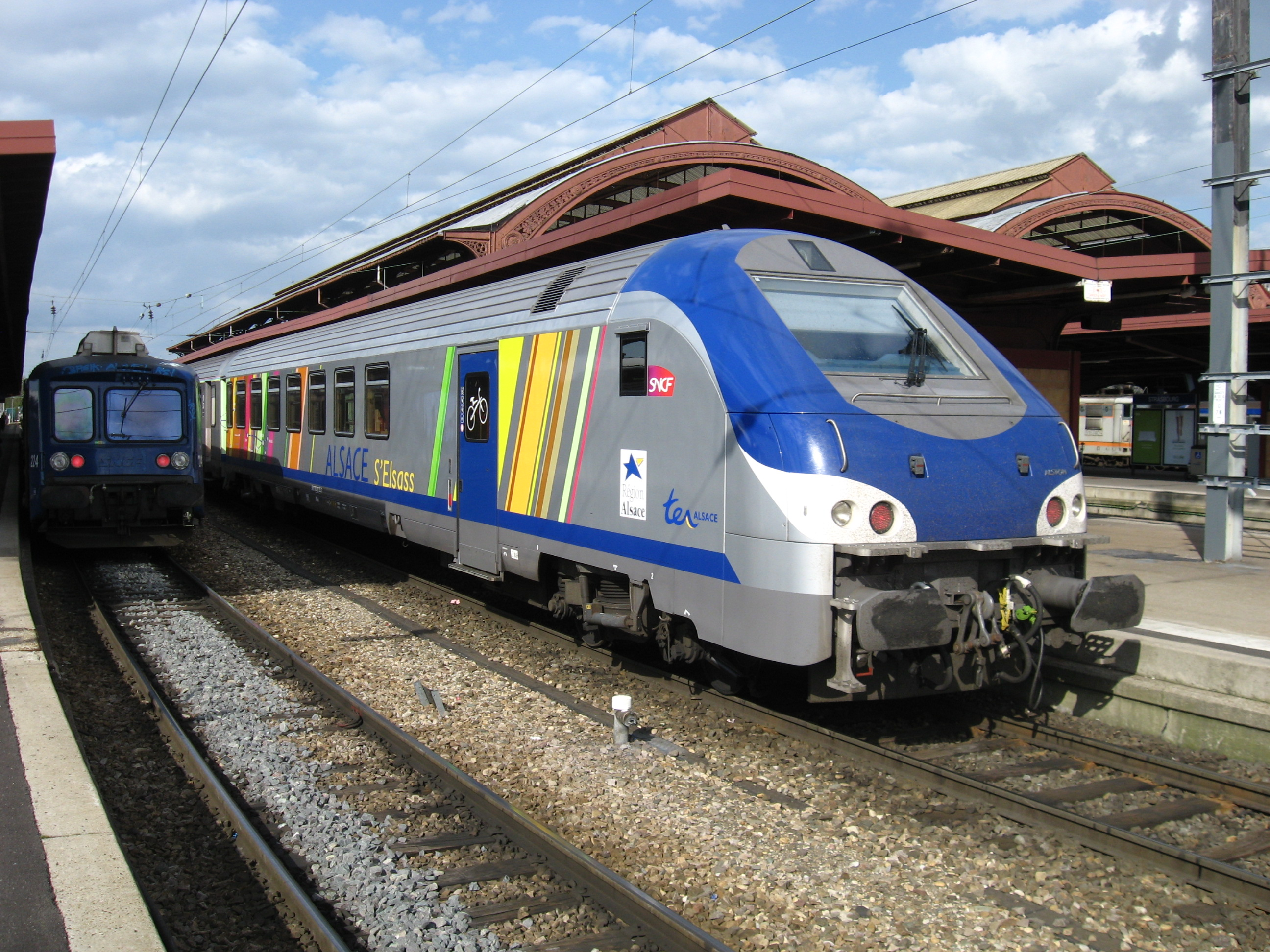
Corail driving carriage at Strasbourg station

The Corail fleet includes 28 voitures-pilote, classified as B^{6}Dux.

=== Denmark ===
The Danish ABs were acquired in 2002. The control car is manufactured by Bombardier. They are to be upgraded for ERTMS, starting 2019.

=== Germany ===
The first German attempts to use control cars (German: Steuerwagen) and remote control-equipped steam locomotives were before World War II by the Deutsche Reichsbahn (DRB). The driver's control instructions were transmitted from the control car to the locomotive by a Chadburn-type machine telegraph (similar to engine order telegraphs on ships). The order had to be immediately acknowledged and implemented by the automatic firebox controllers. This indirect control was judged as impractical and unsafe, because, although the driver controlled the brake directly, the danger existed that in an emergency the locomotive would continue supplying "push" power for some time and possibly derail the train.

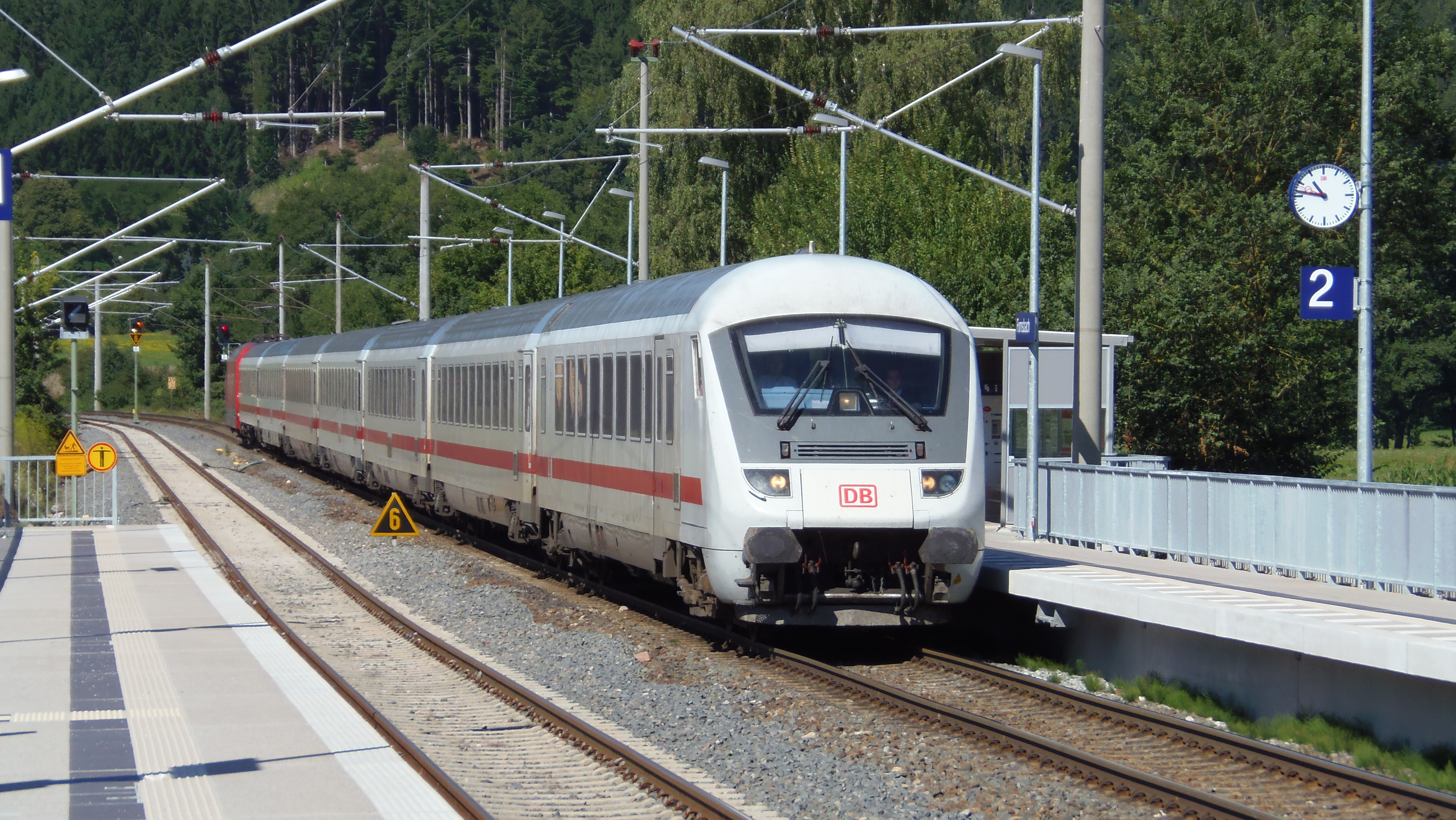
A Steuerwagen control car leading a DB Intercity train. A locomotive is seen pushing from the rear.

Attempts to use electric locomotives (beginning with a converted E 04 class model) were more promising, as the engine driver could control the locomotive directly. World War II interrupted the test program, despite good successes. Only after the war would control car operation be slowly accepted, when locomotives and suitably equipped cars became available.

The length of train consists in push-pull operations was originally limited to 10 cars for reasons of guidance dynamics. A speed limit of 120 km/h (75 mph) was also imposed, rising to 140 km/h (87 mph) in 1980. This was not an operational hindrance, as push-pull trains were generally initially used in six-car commuter trains.

Only since the mid-1990s have long-distance trains, which can have up to 14 cars and travel at speeds of 200 km/h (120 mph), been operated with control cars. A special circumstance is the ICE 2, which may operate with the control car in the lead at up to 250 km/h (160 mph) on the recently built high-speed lines.

=== Hungary ===
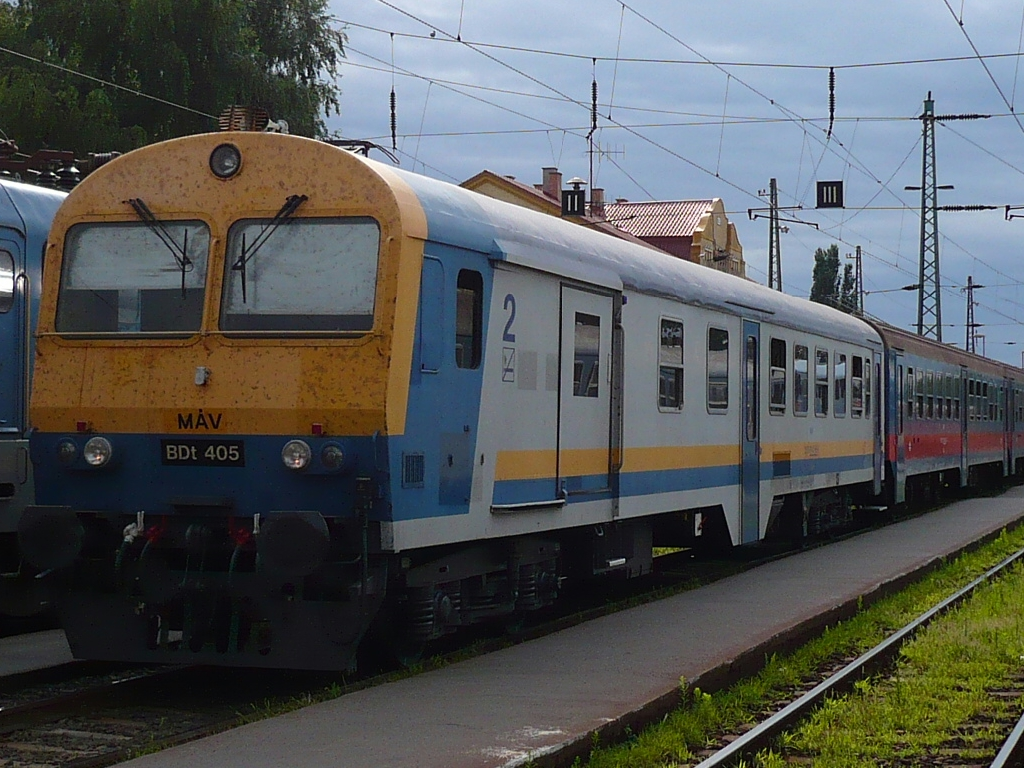
Control car MÁV BDt 322, still the series of control cars with the largest active number in Hungary, now mainly used on electrified rural lines

Control cars in Hungary are present since the 1960s. The first type of control cars used by MÁV, that is still used on low traffic branch lines was the BDt (then called BDat) series, with the BDt 100 series being capable of travelling with diesel (and formerly with steam) engines (most notably the M41 series), and the BDt 300 series being capable of travelling with electric V43 series engines. These carriages were built by the MÁV Dunakeszi Main Workshop between 1962 and 1972.

Most of the BDt 100 series, with lack of function after the Bzmot series overtook the shrinking number of unelectrified branch lines, were converted to BDt 400 series by the Dunakeszi Main Workshop, now led by Bombardier, in 2005 (after a prototype series of 7 built in 1999). They are only compatible with the V43 2xxx series, as only they have digital remote control.

With the purchase of the former East German carriage series from the DB, called "Halberstadters", 27 control cars serialed Bybdtee arrived in Hungary. Although a V43 3xxx series was introduced that has special remote control compatible to these control cars, because of the Halberstadters' rare use as branch line carriages, they are rarely used as effective control cars, and are more frequently seen as a regular carriage because of their bicycle storage space.

There are more carriages that are technically separate control cars, like the Bdx series that were part of the (now deleted from rolling stock) MDmot DMU series, or the Bmxt series that is part of the BDVmot and BVhmot EMU series, but they are considered and treated as a part of their DMU and EMU unit respectively.

=== Ireland ===
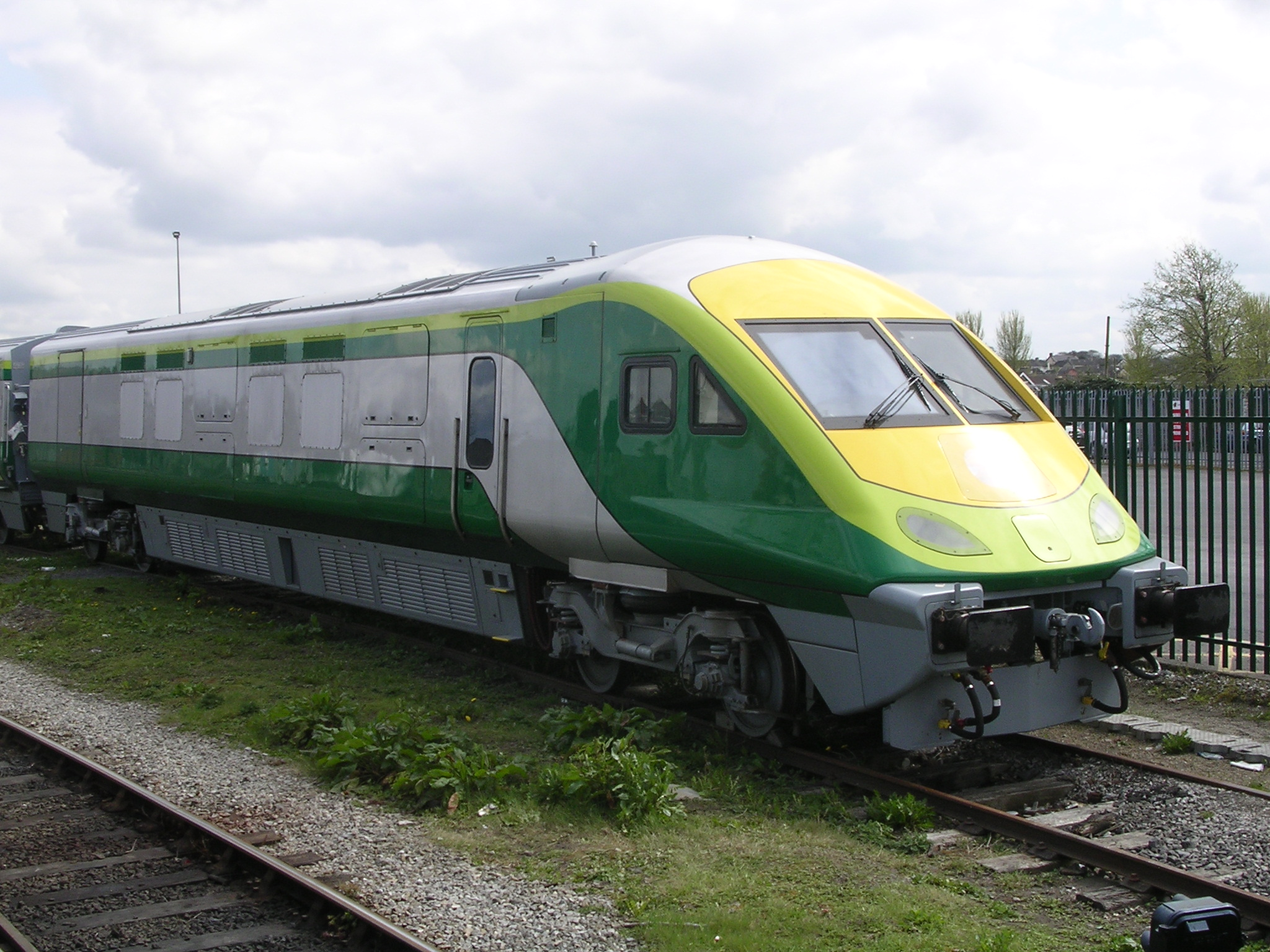
Mark 4 DVT at Limerick Colbert Station in 2006

Iarnród Éireann operates two classes of push-pull trainsets, each with its own Control Car:

- De Dietrich (Enterprise service) with driving cab containing EMD control stand, luggage compartment and passenger seating. On this set, train heating was supplied from the locomotive Head End Power System, but this led to reliability issues on the 201 Class locomotives, so Mark 3 Generator vans have replaced one of the De Dietrich standard class coaches in the formation since September 2012.
  - Numbered 9001–9004
- CAF (Mark 4) with driving cab containing replica locomotive control stand, luggage compartment and twin engine / generator sets for train heating. No passenger seating is provided.
  - Numbered 4001–4008

All Mark 4 Control Cars have full-sized driving cabs with EMD locomotive type power and brake controls. Locomotive control is by means of an AAR system, modified by Iarnród Éireann (IÉ) to include control of train doors and operate with 201 Class locomotives.

Iarnród Éireann formerly operated Mark 3 Control Cars from 1989 until 2009:

- Mark 3s with driving cab containing replica locomotive control stand, luggage compartment, underslung Cummins engine / generator set for train heating and passenger seating.
  - Numbered 6101–6105, converted from Mark 3 InterCity cars for suburban push-pull services. These were withdrawn in September 2009 following the introduction of 22000 Class InterCity Railcars. These units have since been scrapped apart from 6105 which has been preserved by the West Clare Railway.

=== Italy ===
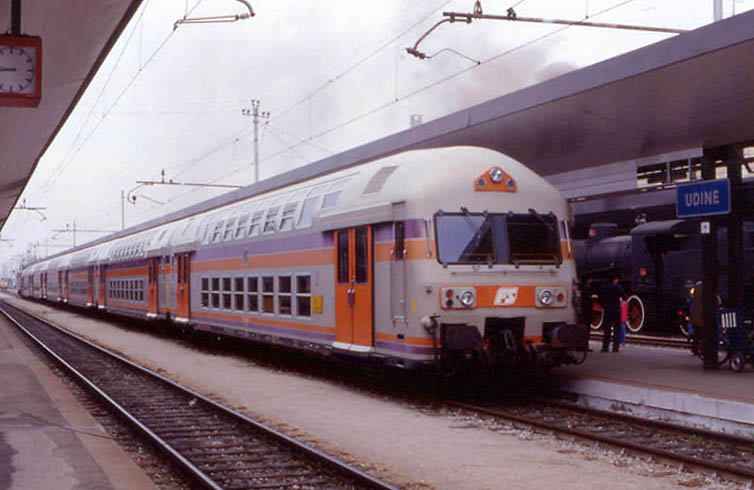
Doppio piano driving carriage at Udine station in 1997

In Italy, the first push-pull trains began to run after World War II.

At the time there were no systems to actually remote command the rear locomotive, so an engineer had to take place in it and command traction, following instructions (via an apposite intercom) given by the other driver, who remained in the front car, commanding brakes and sighting signals. This lasted until the adoption of the 78-wire cable in the 1970s, which enabled full remote commanding from control cars.

Today push-pull trains are very common, and different kinds of control cars are employed:

- UIC Z1 control cars
- MDVC type control cars, with aerodynamic or communicating cabin
- Piano ribassato type control cars, with flat, refurbished E464-like or communicating cabin
- Doppio Piano bilevel control cars
- UIC-X type control cars
- Vivalto type control car

These types allow full remote control of any Italian locomotive supplied with standard 78-wire cable, except for UIC Z1, which are used on IC services and are only able to command class E.402 locomotives, and MDVC Diesel-specific version, usable only with class D.445 Diesel locomotives.

The same driving commands are used for both rheostatic and electronic locomotives, but their meanings change.

Vivalto type control cars, at this time, can only remote command Class E.464 and Class E.632 locomotives, because of software issues, though are able to command other locomotive types. Vivalto cars can also use TCN remote control cable.

Driving cars can be recognized because of the "np" in their identification number and usually also have a dedicated compartment for bicycle and luggage transportation.

There also are specific EMU/DMU non-motorized units control cars, which (in Trenitalia) are classified as Le / Ln XXX with no significant difference between them and motorized units except the lack of traction motors.

=== The Netherlands ===
The use of cab cars (Dutch: stuurstandrijtuig) in The Netherlands by NS is becoming rare due to the conversion of the sets to EMUs and the discontinued use of control cars on intercity direct services.

The use of a "virtual EMU" concept for some short-distance trains in the north of the country is where train sets are formed of a driving carriage, two or three intermediate carriages and a class 1700 electric locomotive. These train sets are diagrammed as if they were all EMUs resulting in formations with two locomotives, often at intermediate positions in the train. Most of the train sets have been converted into double-decker EMUs called DDZ.

=== Poland ===
In Poland, the term used is "wagon sterowniczy", which literally means "control carriage".

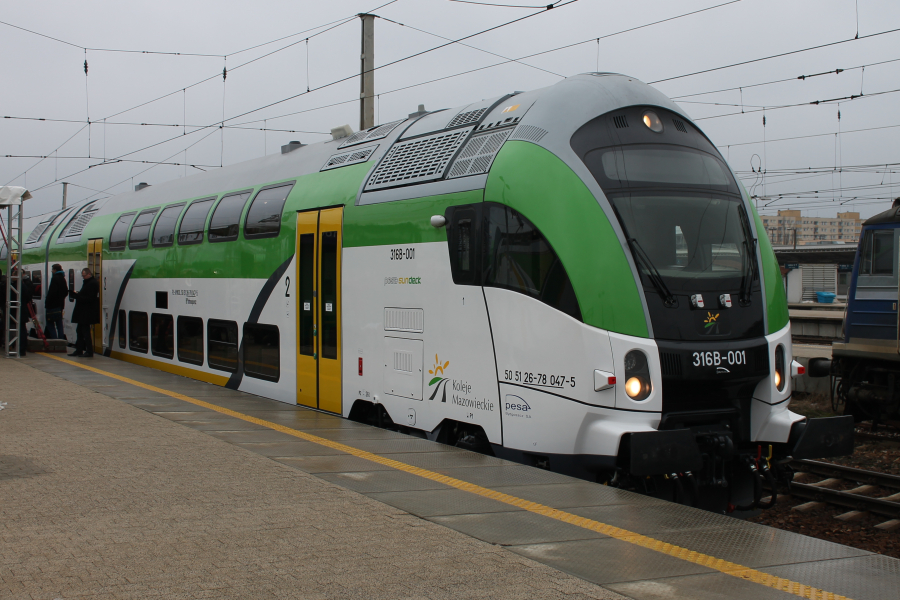
Pesa Sundeck 316B Control Car

Masovian Railways use driving trailers on their regional services. The first batch of double-decker driving trailers and cars, the Twindexx Bombardier Double-deck Coaches, was delivered in 2008. The second batch, PESA-made Sundecks, was delivered at the end of 2015.

=== Russia ===
In Russia, as part of the first Push-Pull railway train DP2D Driving Trailers used to operate a TEP70 diesel locomotive from other side of the train. The trailers are ultimated with EP2DM head cars, making the replacement simple. Currently, these trailers are completing the certification testings along with the DMUs.

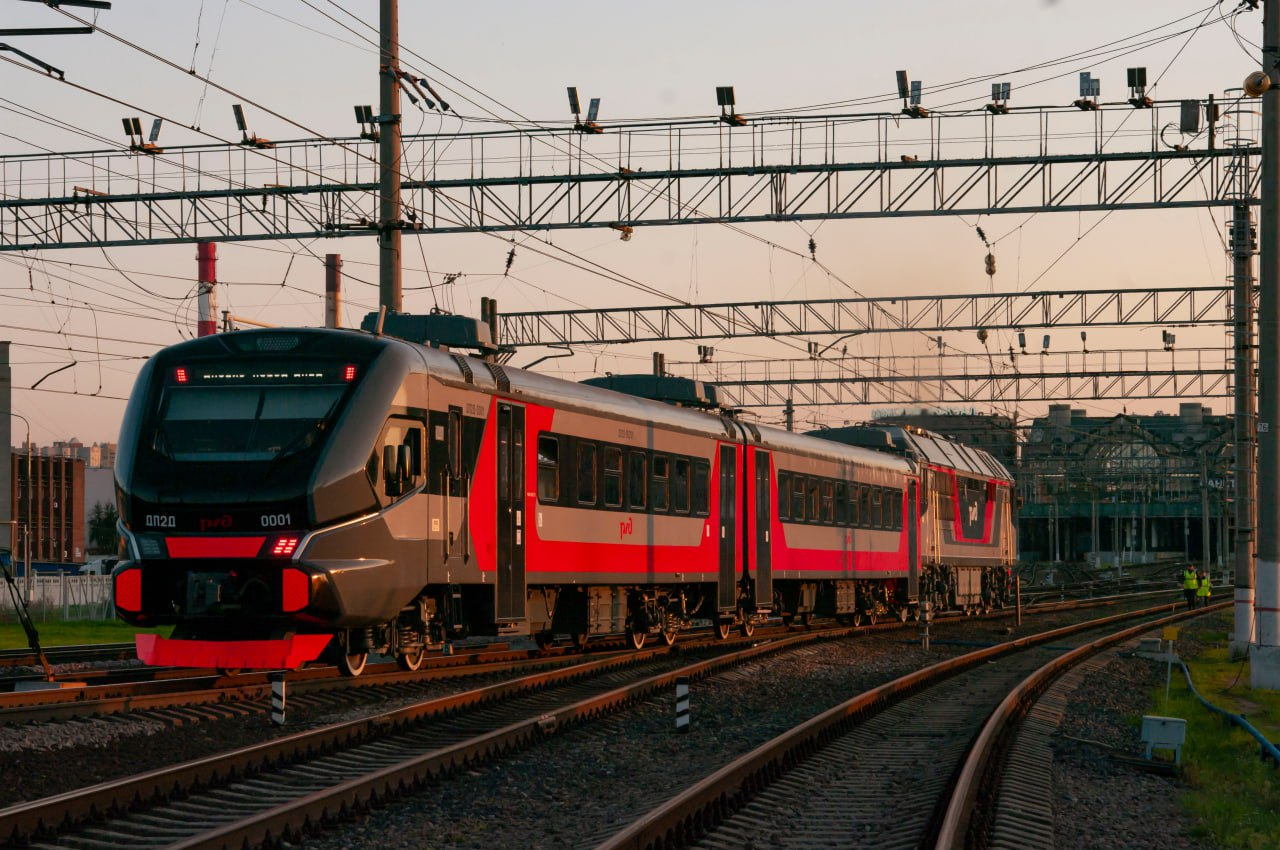
DP2D control car based on EP2DM EMU

=== Sweden ===
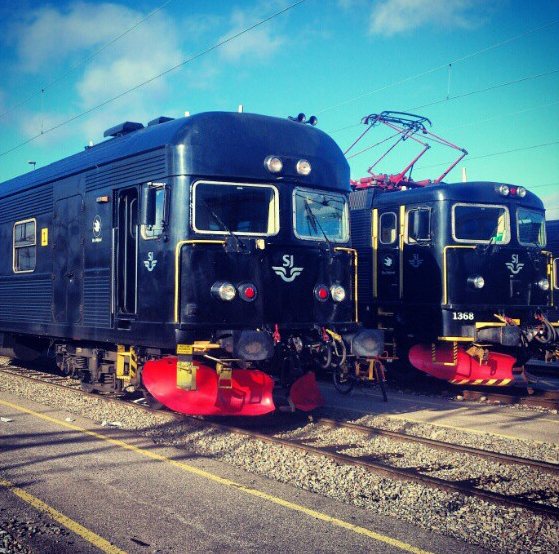
SJ AFM7

There has only been one type of control car in service in Sweden. Only three examples of the AFM7 were made and they are currently in service with SJ in the Mälaren Valley. The Swedish word for control car is manövervagn which literally means "manoeuvre car".

=== Switzerland ===
Swiss driving trailers operate in many different configurations. There are several models currently in service on S-Bahn networks as well as regional, InterRegio, and InterCity services. These are operated by the federal railway system (SBB) as well as various private railroads throughout the country (including narrow gauge lines) and into France, Germany, and Italy.

Driving trailers are classified after the UIC-lettering system, adding a "t", giving Bt (second class), BDt (second class + baggage), ABt (first + second class), or Dt (baggage).

For Intercity trains there are the Bt IC that work together with EW IV and the double-deck version for the IC 2000 trainsets, working with Re 460.

The Zürich S-Bahn trainsets with Re 450 work in fix consists of Re 450 - B - AB - Bt but intermediate cars and driving trailers are numbered as coaching stock.

"NPZ" Regional and S-Bahn trains with RBDe 560 usually have a matching Bt driving trailer. Replacement by an older BDt EW I/II had originally been possible. Older driving trailers, mostly BDt EW I/II and a few remaining Dt of SBB could be used with Re 420 and RBe 540 and some motive power of private railways. In theory also Re 430 and Re 620 can be controlled but these classes.

The BLS operated four groups of driving trailers:

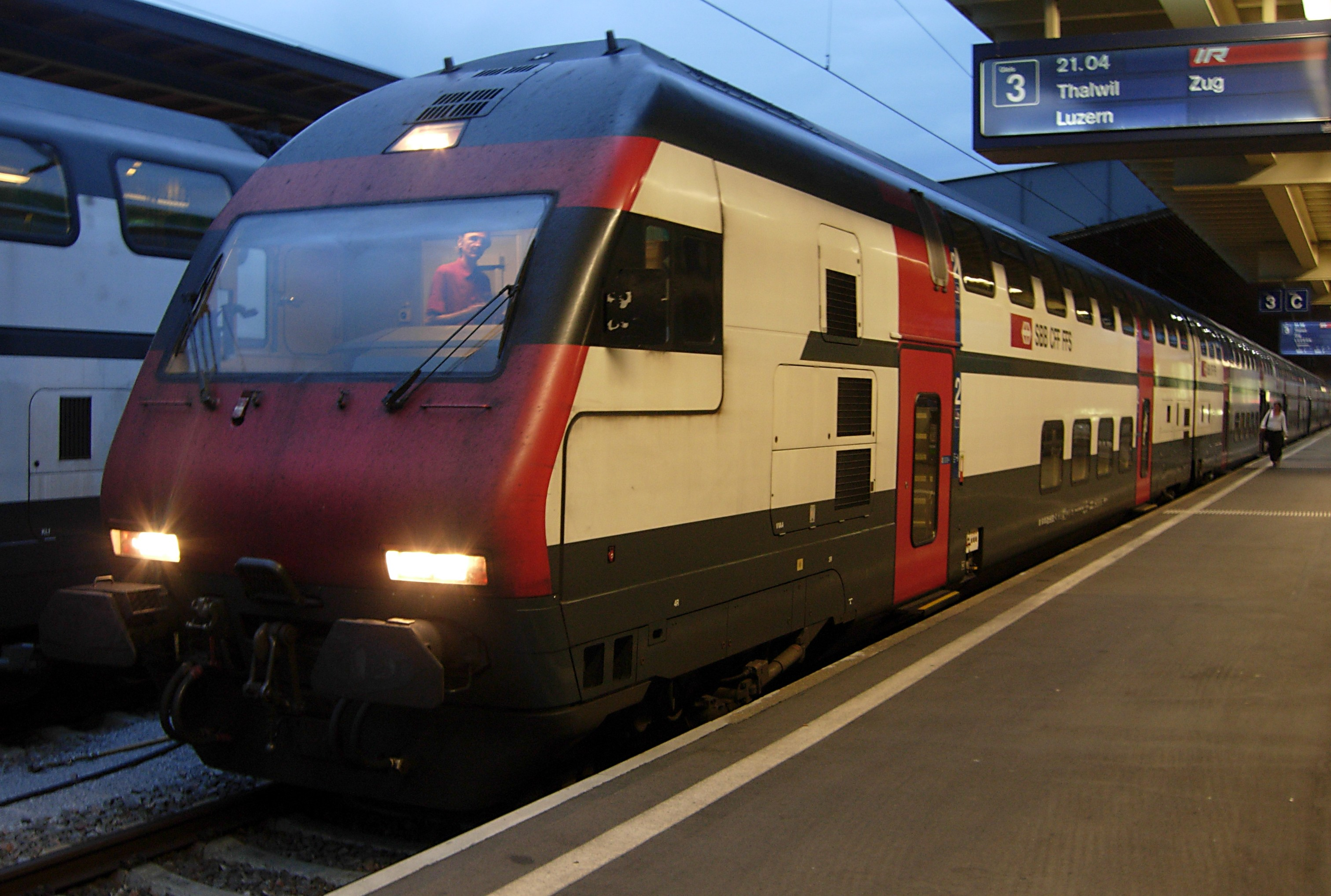
Double-decker Swiss IC 2000 Steuerwagen

- ABt NPZ to go with RBDe 565 and RBDe 566 II (ex RM)
- Bt EW I 950-953, BDt 940-941, car-shuttle BDt 942-945, 946-949 and 939 can work with Re 425, Ae 4/4 and Re 465
- Bt EW III, BDt EW II (both ex SBB), Bt EW I 901-902 (ex Thurbo/MThB) and leased Dt from SBB can work with Re 420.5 ex SBB and BLS Re 465.
- Bt EW I 950–953, BDt 940–941, car-shuttle BDt 942–945, 946-949 and 939 can work with Re 425, Ae 4/4 and Re 465

With the renewal of its rolling stock, all these driving trailers have disappeared.

Südostbahn had a fleet of ABt for their BDe 4/4 but had been fully replaced by FLIRTs. NPZ ABt existed for the two types of RBDe 566 SOB owns (566 071-076 ex BT and 566 077-080 ex SOB of the SBB-type). Nine BDt were used for the Voralpen-Express with Re 456, Re 446 or SBB-CFF-FFS Re 420.

The narrow gauge Zentralbahn ABt could at some point control HGe 101 (ex SBB), De 110, BDeh 140 (ex LSE) and the "SPATZ" ABe 130. Meanwhile the remaining ABt are specialized for one type of motive power.

The Rhaetian Railway (RhB) had, besides the ABDt that worked with Be 4/4 511-516, a group of driving trailers that could be used with their Ge 4/4 I, II and III locomotives. Some of them are specially fitted for Vereina car shuttle trains with Ge 4/4 III. The latest At, matching the Alvra train sets, can work with Ge 4/4 III, Ge 4/4 II and Allegras. The similar Bt only go with Allegras and Ge 4/4 II, often on the Arosa line.

The Matterhorn-Gotthard-Bahn (MGB) has numerous driving trailers for almost all types of motive power. They work regional trains and car shuttle trains through the Furka Base Tunnel.

=== United Kingdom ===
In the United Kingdom, driving trailers may have one or two driving cabs. They have been used for many decades, with the Great Western Railway often using autocoaches on branch line services. These allowed a train driver to remotely control the regulator and reverser of a suitably equipped locomotive. The fireman remained on the locomotive to operate the boiler and locomotive whistle. Locomotives were commonly sandwiched between a pair of autocoaches, allowing a maximum of four to be used.

==== Driving Trailers ====
A Driving Brake Standard Open or DBSO is a specially converted Mark 2 passenger car. Initially operated by ScotRail from 1979, they were operated on InterCity and Anglia Railways services on the Great Eastern Main Line from the late-1980s until 2006. Some have been refurbished for use on Network Rail test trains. Others were used by Direct Rail Services on Cumbrian Coast Line locomotive hauled passenger trains under contract to Northern Rail until late 2018 when they were replaced by regular Diesel multiple units.

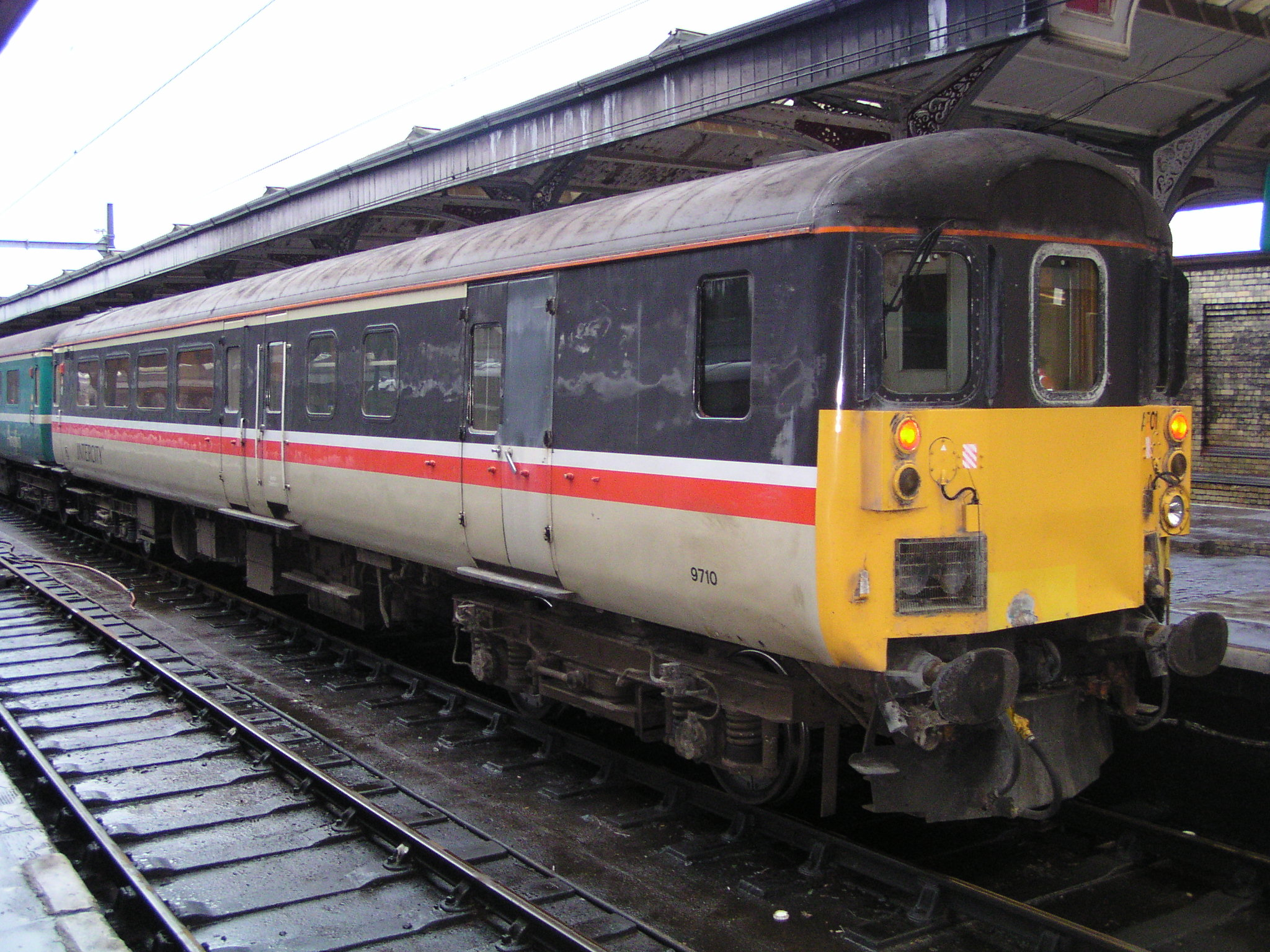
DBSO 9710 in InterCity livery at Norwich

The Mark 5a sets currently operated by Chiltern Railways and formerly operated by TransPennine Express include a purpose built Driving Trailer.

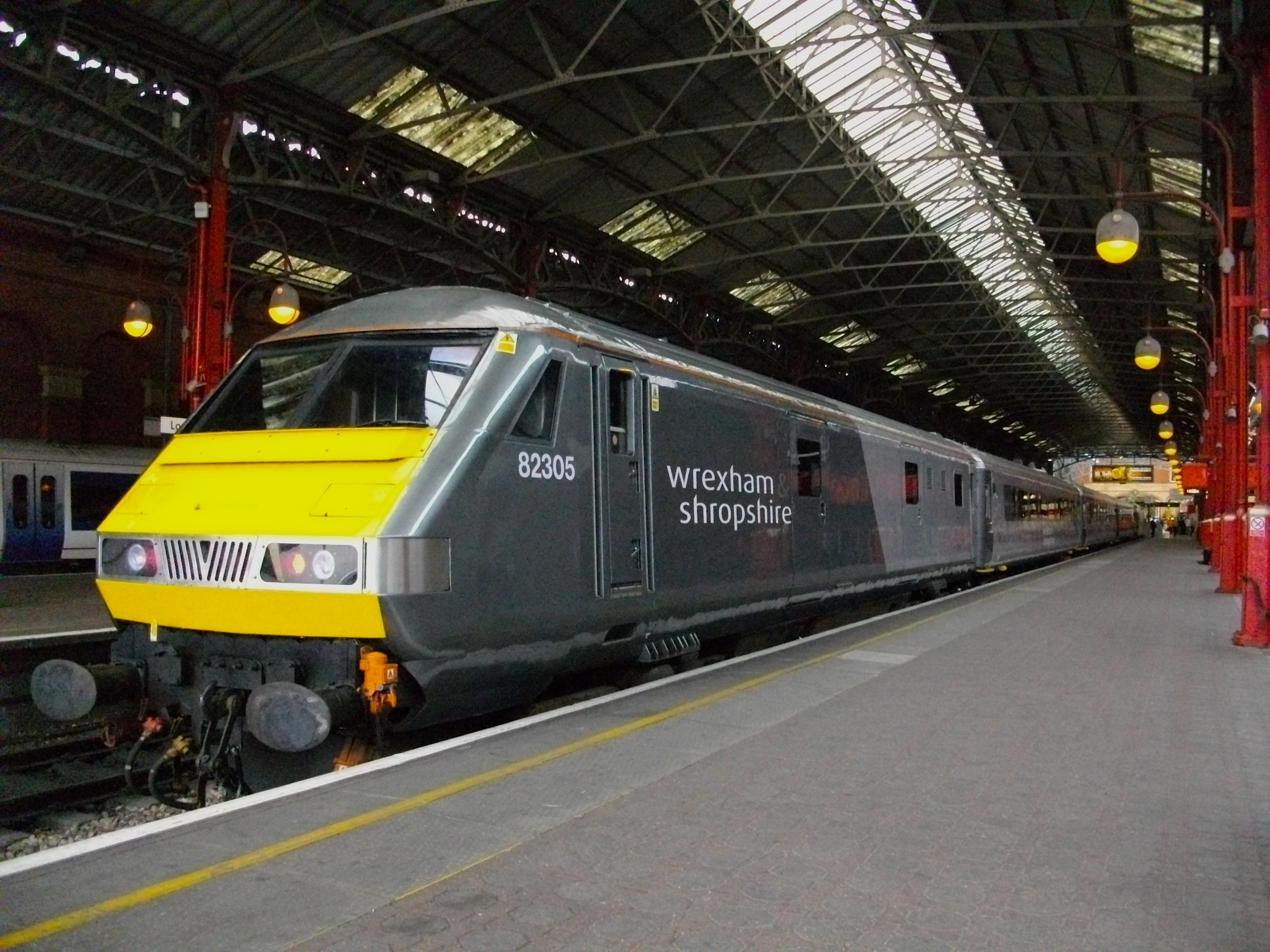
Wrexham & Shropshire Mark 3 DVT at Marylebone station

==== Driving Van Trailer ====
A Driving Van Trailer or DVT is a more modern type of control car, purpose-built to include space for baggage and a guard's office. The DVT was developed in the late-1980s from the DBSO and designed to be used with Mark 3s on West Coast Main Line services and Mark 4s on the East Coast Main Line. As of February 2021, Mark 3 DVTs are in service with Chiltern Railways and Network Rail, with Mark 4 DVTs in service with London North Eastern Railway with some to be operated by Transport for Wales Rail from 2021. Former operators of the Mark 3 DVTs are Arriva Trains Wales, Greater Anglia, KeolisAmey Wales, Virgin Trains West Coast and Wrexham & Shropshire.

== Oceania ==
=== Australia ===
==== NSW ====
In Sydney, driving trailer on EMUs were used to make 2 car sets. However, they were converted to regular trailers (cars) due to redundancy: On one two car set, there was only 4 motors, one pantograph, and one compressor, while a 4 car set had 2 compressors and pantographs and 8 motors. Examples of these driving trailers were on old red rattler cars and on K sets (4 trailers), S sets and V sets. All modern EMUs now use driving trailers while cab-less motor cars are in-between.

In rural lines, some railmotors used driving trailers, although most were semi-permanently coupled together with their respective partner. 600/700, 620/720 and 660/760 class railmotors were a combination of one power car (e.g. one 600 class car) and one driving trailer (e.g. one 700 class car). All CTC trailers, trailers built for CPH railmotors, were rebuilt to have a cab at one end and were used as driving trailers.

==== South Australia ====
2100 class railcar are driving trailers, being placed in a 2-car consist with a 2000 class power unit, sometimes with a second trailer to make a 3-car consist-the power car would be placed in between the two trailers. As of 2018, only three of these trailers exist, the rest were scrapped. Two are preserved and one that was donated to South Australian Metropolitan Fire Service (cut-in half). Three 2000 class power units out of the twelve have had the same fate.

=== New Zealand ===
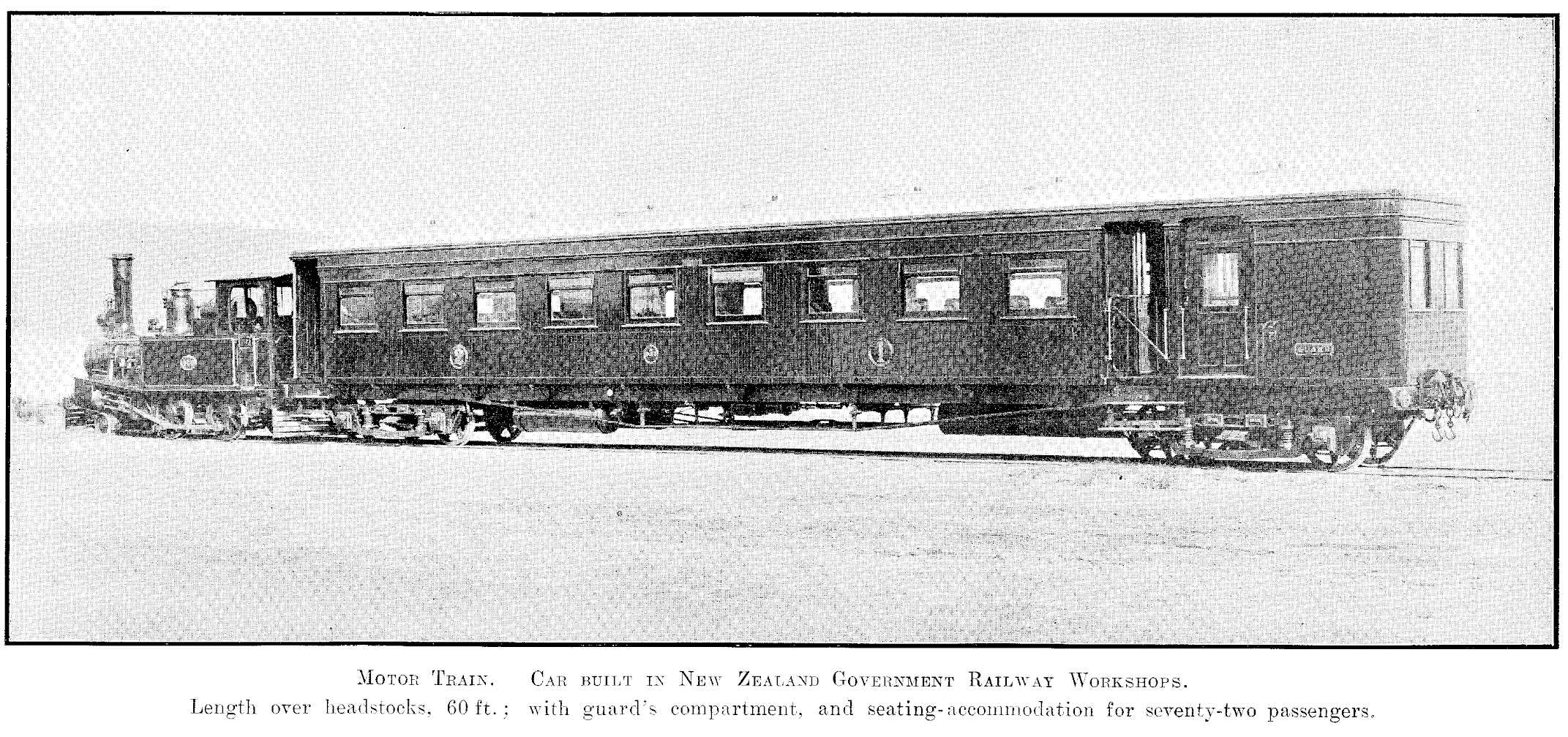
1906 72-seat 60ft 'motor train' built by New Zealand Railways with a NZR D class (1874) locomotive

Experiments with light railcars were aimed at cutting costs on lightly used branch lines. Autotrains were built in 1906 and 1907 and by 1925 NZR had 8 88-seat and 5 72-seat motor trains. In 1908 there was a motor train Auckland suburban service to Otahuhu and between Morrinsville and Putaruru in 1913.

In Auckland, Transdev Auckland operated 21 DC class locomotives and four DFT class locomotives (owned by KiwiRail) in push-pull mode with 24 sets of 3-5 SA cars and an SD driving car with driving cab and remote controls (ex British Rail Mark 2 carriages rebuilt for suburban service), owned by Auckland Transport. The carriages were replaced with EMUs in July 2015.

== Asia ==
=== Sri Lanka ===
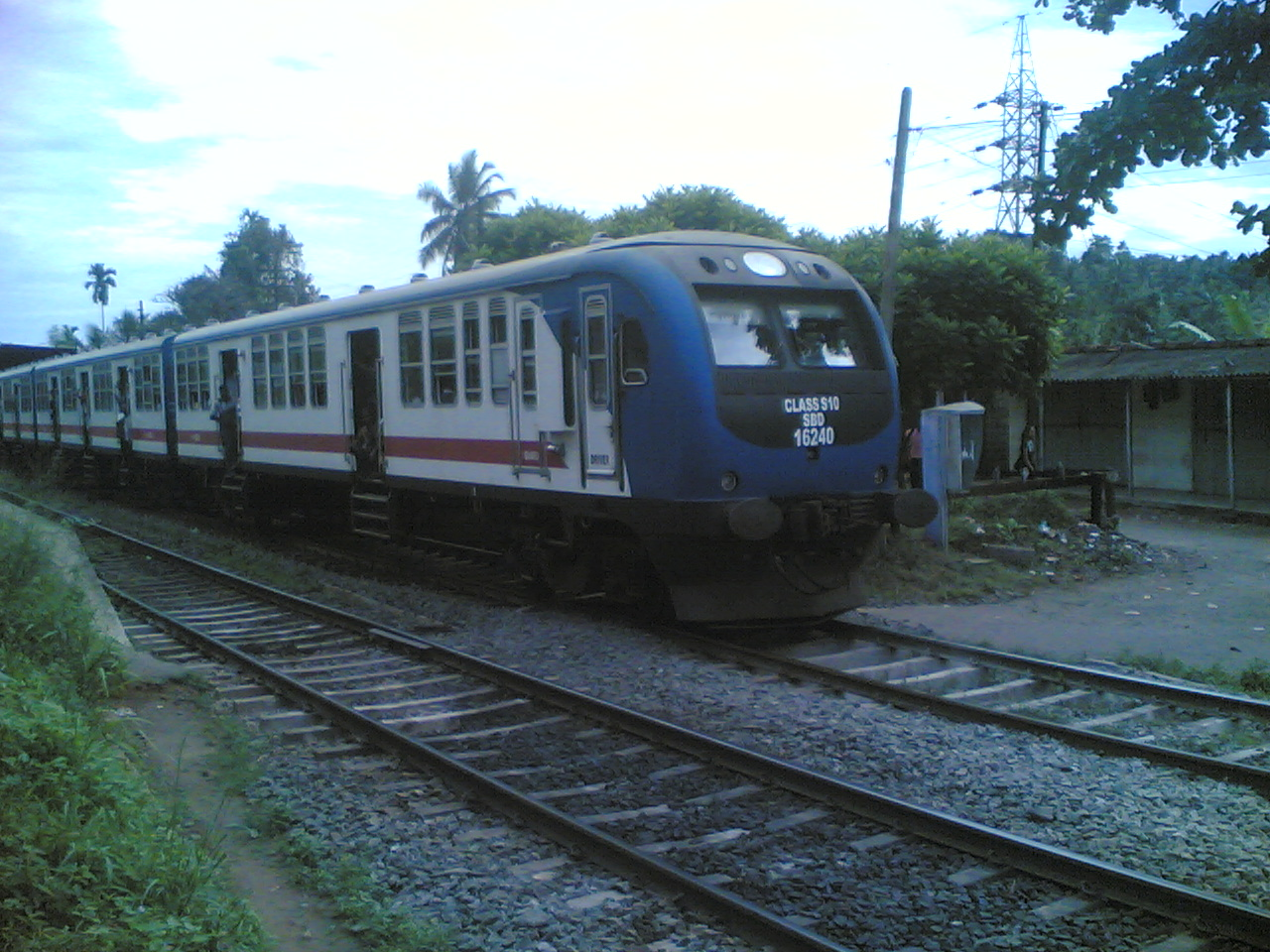
A control car of a DMU in Sri Lanka

Control cars are available on most Diesel multiple units operated by Sri Lanka Railways.

=== Israel ===
Control cars exist on all push-pull trains operated by Israel Railways, as well as their Siemens Desiro electric multiple unit sets.

=== India ===
Control cabs are generally found on DEMU's, EMU's and MEMU's in India.

=== Japan ===
The Sagano Scenic Railway uses control cars with the control car on the Kameoka end of the train.

== See also ==
- Cab (locomotive)
