= Metrolink rolling stock =

Rolling stock of the Metrolink commuter rail system in South California

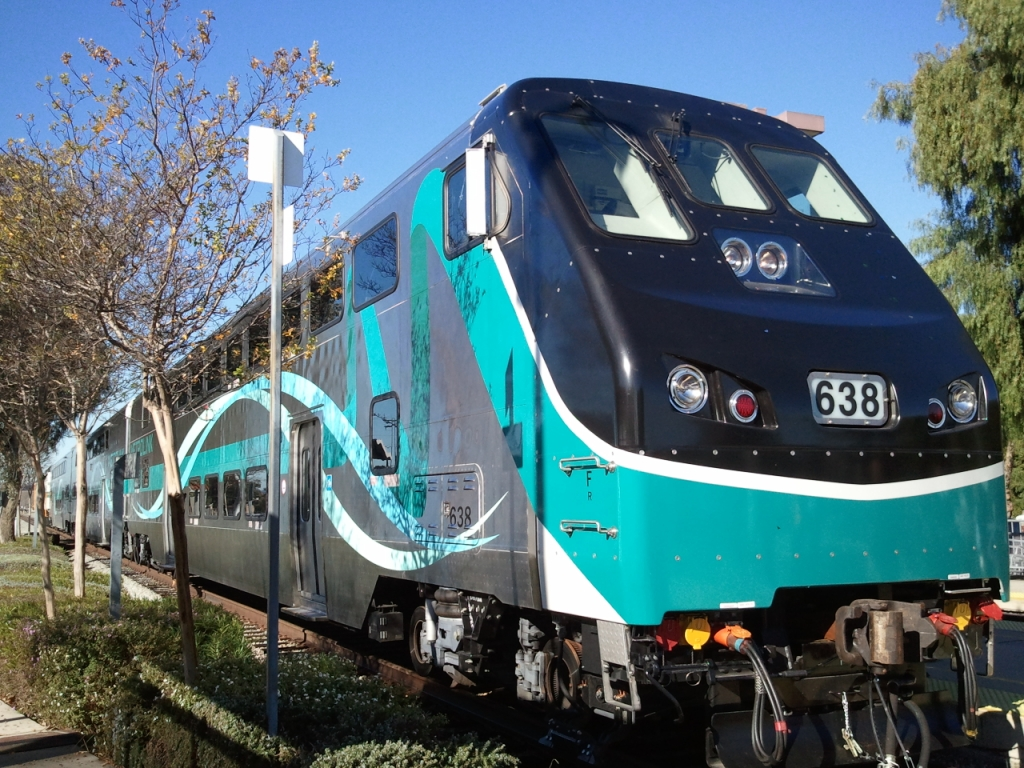
A Metrolink Hyundai Rotem cab car in Southern California in 2015

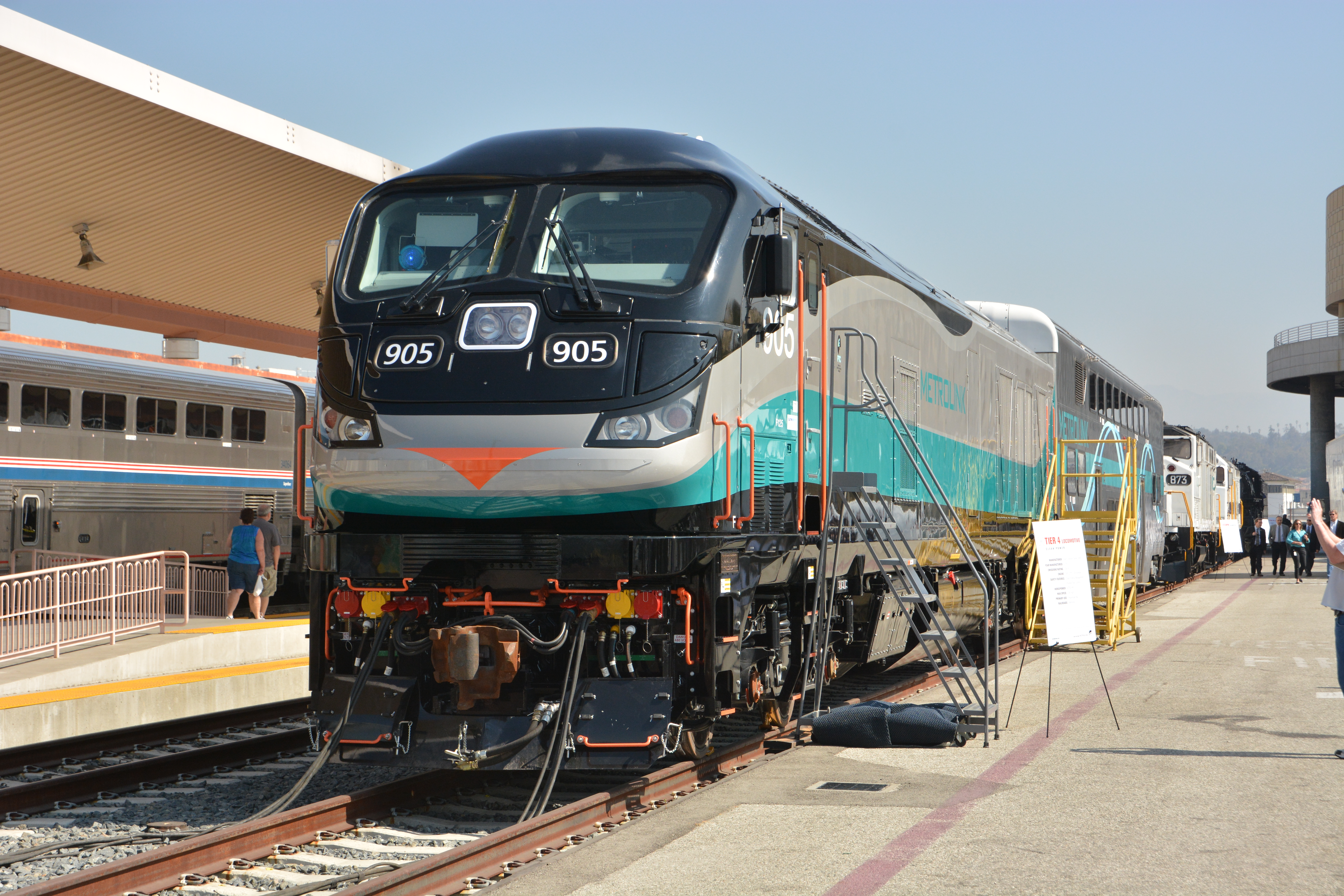
An EMD F125 locomotive of Metrolink at Los Angeles Union Station

Metrolink, the commuter rail system serving Southern California, operates a fleet of passenger train rolling stock consisting of 60 locomotives, 121 active Bombardier BiLevel Coaches (called the “Sentinel Fleet” by Metrolink), and 137 Rotem Commuter Cars (called the “Guardian Fleet”). Operation of the weekday train schedule requires 36 locomotives to be operational.

== History ==
In November 1990, the Los Angeles County Transportation Commission approved the $51 million purchase of 40 bi-level passenger train cars from the Urban Transportation Development Corporation (later known as Bombardier Transportation). The cars would be based on the design developed for the GO Transit commuter rail system in Ontario, Canada. The order would later be expanded to include 63 trailer cars and 31 cab cars. Additionally, 23 EMD F59PH locomotives would be purchased from General Motors' Electro-Motive Division (EMD). Metrolink claimed that they offered the cleanest burning, low-emission diesel engines in the nation at the time. The first of the original fleet was delivered in May of 1992.

An order for an additional 20 Rotem cars was placed after Metrolink obtained a loan from the LACMTA, although this still leaves Metrolink 34 cars short of its goal to completely replace the entire Bombardier fleet. From 2008-2011, due to an increase in ridership, Metrolink leased 10 cars from the Utah Transit Authority's commuter train FrontRunner. All leased Frontrunner passenger cars were returned once the newer Hyundai Rotem bilevel cars (Guardian Fleet) went into service.

With a sufficient number of Guardian Fleet cars on hand, former CEO John Fenton introduced new on-board services. All weekday trains now include at least one Quiet Car (designated as the second car back from the locomotive). 35 older Sentinel Fleet coaches were converted to Bicycle Cars by having their seats removed from the lower level. If demand for bicycle cars rise, more cars would be retrofitted. Only the Sentinel Cars are retrofitted due to the Guardian Fleet seats serving as an integral part of the cars’ safety features and therefore the seats cannot be removed. In Summer 2017, Metrolink fitted their Bicycle cars with surf board carriers. Each Bicycle car can now carry up to 5 surfboards for transportation to beaches in between San Clemente and Oceanside.

The extra equipment has also allowed Metrolink to add express service, which reduces travel times up to 45 minutes on the Antelope Valley and San Bernardino Lines as pilot programs. If successful, Metrolink will make the expresses permanent and test express service on other routes.

About 10-30 surplus Sentinel cars are stored close to Union Station on tracks laying parallel to the Los Angeles River. Metrolink's long-term plans for these cars is uncertain as Metrolink's original goal was to replace all of the Sentinel Fleet coaches with the Guardian Fleet coaches, but this is not possible until additional Guardian Fleet orders are placed. The decision of which Sentinel Fleet cars to keep or scrap is complicated. The Sentinel Fleet passenger coaches carry little to no debt, but require major rehabilitation as they are close to the end of their service life. In addition to rehabilitation, the Sentinel Coaches would also require safety features that the Hyundai Rotem Coaches have, such as enhanced seating and break-away tables, but reinforcement of the aluminum alloy body structure isn't needed. (Sentinel Fleet cars lack impact-absorbing horizontal steel side beams and crumple zones.)

On September 3, 2015, Metrolink announced the addition of a second locomotive (leased from BNSF Railway) to each train set to be coupled in front of the Rotem cab car while they undergo a review of their safety features following the 2015 Oxnard train derailment. The cab cars remained in service as passenger coaches. The investigation examined the plow-like attachment under the front of the cab cars that failed to prevent the derailment by allowing wreckage to get under the wheels. On November 1, 2016, the leased BNSF locomotives were returned, as repairs and enhancements to the Rotem cab cars' plows were completed.

In June 2019, Metrolink contracted with Talgo and Systra to rebuild 50 of its 121 Bombardier Bi-level cars. The $64 million dollar contract, will focus on rebuilding the oldest Generation 1 cars which were delivered in 1992 and never received a manufacturer recommended mid-life overhaul (normally to take place after 15 years of service). The rebuild will replace and upgrade mechanical components of the cars, modernize interiors and will repaint the exterior into a new livery. Metrolink is now in the gradual process of rebuilding the other 71 cars since September 2024.

All trains must run with a Guardian cab car and a Guardian coach in position closest to the locomotive for proper crash energy management.

== Current fleet ==
Fleet numbers	Qty Delivered	Qty in service	Year(s) Built	Make & Model	Image	Notes
Locomotives
852, 856, 861, 868, 873	23	5	1992–1993	EMD F59PH		Reserve fleet.; Rebuilt with lower-emission (Tier 2) engine.
888–902	15	10	2008–2009	MPI MP36PH-3C		
903–942	40	40	2016–2021	EMD F125		
Passenger cars
101–163	63	59	1992–1993	Bombardier BiLevel Generation 1		24 cars converted into bike cars.; All cars undergoing rebuild.
164–182	18	0	1997	Bombardier BiLevel Generation 2		166 and 168 in storage, awaiting rebuild.; Others sold to Caltrain.
183–210	27	23	2002	Bombardier BiLevel Generation 3		Generation 3 cars with smooth sides (without rivets) and power ports at most seats.; 195, 202, and 206 in storage, awaiting rebuild.
211–290	60	60	2010–2013	Rotem Commuter Cars		211 and 263 involved in 2015 Oxnard train derailment and are in storage.
Cab cars
601–631	31	28	1992–1993	Bombardier BiLevel Generation 1		Generation 1 ex-cab cars with only one front window.; All cars in service after rebuild and conversion to trailer cars with cab compartment removed.
632–637	6	0	1997	Bombardier BiLevel Generation 2		Generation 2 cab cars with 2 front windows.; All units in storage, awaiting rebuild and conversion to trailer cars.
638–665, 667-695	53	50	2010–2013	Rotem Commuter Cars		666 renumbered to 695 in late 2014.; 645 involved in 2015 Oxnard train derailment and in storage.

== Retired fleet ==
Fleet numbers	Qty	Year(s) Built	Make & Model	Notes
Locomotives
800	1	1985	EMD F40PH	Former Amtrak 396.; Used for spare for special events, switching, and work trains.; 4 units were originally purchased from Amtrak, the other 3, ex-Amtrak 256, 300, and 338, were later sold for scrap.; Preserved at the Southern California Railway Museum.
851, 853-855, 857-860, 862-867, 869-872	18	1992–1993	EMD F59PH	866 stored at Taylor Yard, pending disposition; 855 involved in 2008 Chatsworth train collision and was scrapped.; 853, 859, 867, 871 and 872 sold to North Carolina Department of Transportation in 2019.; 857 sold to Larry’s Truck and Electric.; 851 preserved at the Fullerton Train Museum in Fullerton, California.; Remainder of the units sold to GO Transit in 2024.
874–881	8	1994	EMD F59PHI	All were retired in 2020.; 875 sold to GO Transit in 2024.; 874 and 877 sold to GO Transit rail services in 2024.
882–883	2	1995	EMD F59PHI	Part of canceled Marlboro train project.; All were retired in 2020.; 883 sold to GO Transit in 2024.; 882 stored at Taylor Yard, pending disposition
884–887	4	2001	EMD F59PHI	Part of canceled Via Rail order.; All were retired in 2020.; All sold to Tren Interoceanico in 2024.
888, 890, 891, 893, 898	5	2008–2009	MPI MP36PH-3C	Retired from mechanical failures.
Passenger cars
113, 133, 148	3	1992–1993	Bombardier Bi-level Generation 1	113 involved in 2002 Placentia train collision and was retired.; 133 and 148 both involved in 2005 Glendale train crash and were retired.
164-165, 167, 169-182	16	1997	Bombardier Bi-level Generation 2	174 involved in an accident at Burbank in January 2003 and was retired.; All others sold to Caltrain
184, 185	2	2002	Bombardier Bi-level Generation 3	184 damaged during delivery and was retired.; 185 involved in 2008 Chatsworth train collision and was retired.
Cab cars
608, 623, 625	3	1992–1993	Bombardier Bi-level Generation 1	Generation 1 cab cars with only one front window.; 608 involved in collision with a truck in Burbank in January 2003 and was retired.; 623 and 625 both involved in 2005 Glendale train crash and were retired.
634	1	1997	Bombardier Bi-level Generation 2	Generation 2 cab cars with 2 front windows.; Involved in 2002 Placentia train collision and was retired.
684	1	2010–2013	Hyundai Rotem Bi-level	Retired after being involved in a collision with an RV in November 2019.

== Leased fleet ==
Fleet Numbers	Qty	Year(s) Built	Make & Model	Notes
Locomotives
RBRX, later LTEX 18520, 18522, 18533	3	1988	EMD F59PH	Ex-GO Transit 520, 522, 533; Owned by CAD Railway Industries, later Larry's Truck and Electric; Retired from Metrolink in 2022; 18520 and 18522 sold to Tren Interoceánico as 3005 and 3006; 18533 to West Coast Express as 907.
CNW 5502a, Later 519	1	1950	EMD E8	Ex-Chicago and Northwestern unit used as a technical demonstrator in 1991; Stored at Taylor Yard in Los Angeles between 1992 and 1997 in frequently used as a yard switcher; Purchased by Monrad Rail Equipment in 1997; Currently preserved under private ownership at the Arizona Railway Museum in Chandler
