= Metrolink crash =

Metrolink crash may refer to:

- 2002 Placentia train collision, the collision of a Metrolink passenger train and a BNSF freight train
- 2005 Glendale train crash, the collision of Metrolink commuter train #100 and an abandoned sport utility vehicle
- 2008 Chatsworth train collision, the collision of a Union Pacific freight train and a Metrolink commuter train
- 2015 Oxnard train derailment, the collision of a Metrolink passenger train and a truck
