= Metrolink =

Metrolink, MetroLink, or Metro-link is the name of several transport services throughout the world:

== Australia ==
- Metro-link Bus Lines, a bus operator in Sydney, New South Wales
- TransdevTSL, formerly known as MetroLink, former joint venture between Transdev and Transfield Services
  - Transdev Brisbane Ferries, formerly known as Metrolink Queensland, a ferry operator in Brisbane, Queensland
  - MetroLink Victoria, former operator of Yarra Trams in Melbourne, Victoria
- Sydney Metro (2008 proposal), also known as Metro Link
- Metlink, a public transport governing body in Melbourne, Australia

== Canada ==
- Metrolinx, a public transport governing body in Southern Ontario, Canada
- MetroLink (Halifax), a bus rapid transit service in the Halifax Regional Municipality, Nova Scotia

== India ==
- Metro-Link Express for Gandhinagar and Ahmedabad, a rapid transit system for the cities of Ahmedabad and Gandhinagar

== Ireland ==
- MetroLink (Dublin), a proposed metro line in Dublin city.

== New Zealand ==
- Metrolink, a division of NZ Bus that operated bus services in Auckland

== United Kingdom ==
- Manchester Metrolink, a light rail network in Greater Manchester, England

== United States ==
- Metrolink (California), a commuter rail system in Southern California
- MetroLink (St. Louis), an electric light rail service in the Saint Louis, Missouri/Illinois metropolitan area
- MetroLink (Tulsa), a bus system in Tulsa, Oklahoma
- Quad Cities MetroLINK, a bus service in the Quad Cities region of Illinois and Iowa
- Plymouth Metrolink, a public transit system that serves Plymouth, Minnesota

== See also ==
- Metrolink crash (disambiguation), various crashes in Southern California
