= California State Route 34 =

State highway in Ventura Couty, California, United States

State Route 34
- SR 34 highlighted in red

Route information
- Maintained by Caltrans
- Length: 13.368 mi (21.514 km)

Major junctions
- West end: SR 1 in Oxnard
- US 101 in Camarillo
- East end: SR 118 at Somis

Location
- Country: United States
- State: California
- Counties: Ventura

Highway system
- State highways in California; Interstate; US; State; Scenic; History; Pre‑1964; Unconstructed; Deleted; Freeways
← SR 33	→ SR 35

State Route 34 (SR 34) is a state highway in the U.S. state of California. It runs through Ventura County from Rice Avenue (State Route 1) in Oxnard to State Route 118 in Somis.

== Route description ==
Route 34 is defined in section 334, subdivision (a), of the California Streets and Highways Code, and that the highway is from "Rice Avenue in the City of Oxnard to Route 118 near Somis". And while control of a former portion of Route 34 has been relinquished by the state to the City of Oxnard, subdivision (b) further mandates that the city must still "maintain within its jurisdiction signs directing motorists to the continuation of Route 34".

SR 34 starts on the west at the intersection of Fifth Street and Rice Avenue (SR 1) in Oxnard (SR 1 is unsigned at that intersection pending upgrades). SR 34 continues east then northeast on Fifth Street until it intersects Pleasant Valley Road in Camarillo. After continuing east on Pleasant Valley Road a short distance, it turns north onto Lewis Road until the intersection with Las Posas Road at the north city limit of Camarillo where Route 34 continues straight ahead as Somis Road. It ends at SR 118 near Somis. This route originally began in Port Hueneme, but in 1965, the portion from Port Hueneme to Oxnard Boulevard (then Route 1) was deleted. Nevertheless, Route 34 mileposts add on these additional 4 miles (6.4 km) along the signed route.

The route parallels the Union Pacific Railroad's Coast Line, which carries Coast Starlight, Pacific Surfliner and Ventura County Line passenger trains, for almost its entire current length.

SR 34 is part of the California Freeway and Expressway System, and portions of the route in Oxnard and Camarillo are part of the National Highway System, a network of highways that are considered essential to the country's economy, defense, and mobility by the Federal Highway Administration.

== History ==
In 1933, a road from Hueneme to near Somis, going through Oxnard and Camarillo, was added to the state highway system. This road was numbered as Route 153 in 1935. In the 1964 state highway renumbering, SR 34 was defined with this routing, ending at SR 118 on the eastern side. In 1965, the highway from Port Hueneme to Oxnard Boulevard (then SR 1) was removed from the state highway system. The part of the highway in Oxnard was authorized by the state legislature to be turned over to the city of Oxnard in 2008.

== Future ==
Next to the Fifth Street/Rice Avenue intersection is an at-grade railroad crossing that was the site of the 2015 Oxnard train derailment, which eventually led to one death and over 30 injuries. At the time it was the twelfth accident at the crossing in ten years. An overpass to allow Rice Avenue to pass over both Fifth Street and the tracks has been planned at that site for almost two decades, but funding had not been available in Ventura County for the estimated $35 million grade separation project. On July 12, 2023, the Ventura County Transportation Commission and the City of Oxnard received $15 million in state funding to build the overpass. As of February 2025, $134.5 million has been invested in the project. Construction started on March 19, and is estimated to be completed in December 2029. Caltrans had already relinquished control of the portion of SR 1 in Oxnard along Oxnard Boulevard in 2014, planning to re-route SR 1 onto that segment of Rice Avenue, officially connecting the highway with SR 34 again.

According to the 2017 Caltrans District 7 Transportation Concept Report for State Route 34, the highway is on the list of routes recommended for relinquishment.

== Major intersections ==
Except where prefixed with a letter, postmiles were measured on the road as it was in 1964, based on the alignment that existed at the time, and do not necessarily reflect current mileage. Postmile prefixes include: R reflecting a realignment in the route since then, M indicating a second realignment, L referring to an overlap due to a correction or change, and T indicating postmiles classified as temporary. Segments that remain unconstructed or have been relinquished to local control may be omitted. The entire route is in Ventura County.

Location	Postmile	Destinations	Notes
Oxnard	6.27	Fifth Street west	Continuation beyond Rice Avenue; former SR 34 west
Oxnard	6.27	Rice Avenue (SR 1)	West end of SR 34
	10.43	Las Posas Road – Camarillo, Point Mugu, CSU Channel Islands	Connects to SR 1 or US 101
Camarillo	12.78	Pleasant Valley east, Lewis Road south – Point Mugu, CSU Channel Islands	
Camarillo	13.60	US 101 (Ventura Freeway) – Ventura, Los Angeles	Interchange; US 101 exit 53B
Somis	17.66	SR 118 (Los Angeles Avenue) – Ventura, San Fernando	East end of SR 34
Somis	17.66	Donlon Road north	Continuation beyond SR 118
1.000 mi = 1.609 km; 1.000 km = 0.621 mi

== See also ==
- List of state highways in California
