= Somis Union School District =

School district in Ventura County, California

Address
- 5268 North Street Somis, California; United States

District information
- Grades: K–8
- Established: 1898; 128 years ago
- Superintendent: Dr. Jesus Vaca
- Schools: 1
- NCES District ID: 0637140

Students and staff
- Students: 230 (2020–2021)
- Teachers: 13.1 (FTE)
- Staff: 14.16 (FTE)
- Student–teacher ratio: 17.56:1

Other information
- Website: somisusd.org

Somis Union School District is a public school district in Ventura County, California, United States. It comprises a single school, Somis Elementary School in Somis, California, which serves students K–8. The district also supervises Somis Academy, a charter school in Camarillo, California which serves students K–12, as well as homeschooling programs.

== History ==
Somis Union School District was organized in 1898 and has been at its current location since the 1920s.

In November 2012, voters approved a $9 million bond issue for the district, the first general obligation bond in the district's history. The school board will use the money to either upgrade Somis School, built in 1924, or replace it.

== Activities ==
=== Band ===
Somis School offers a band teaching class on campus required for all students to participate in. There are two performances each year for the Somis School band, including the Christmas Performance.

=== Art ===
The school also offers art classes where they have hands-on learning from a local artist.
