= Somis, California =

Unincorporated community in California, United States

- Unincorporated community Census-designated place
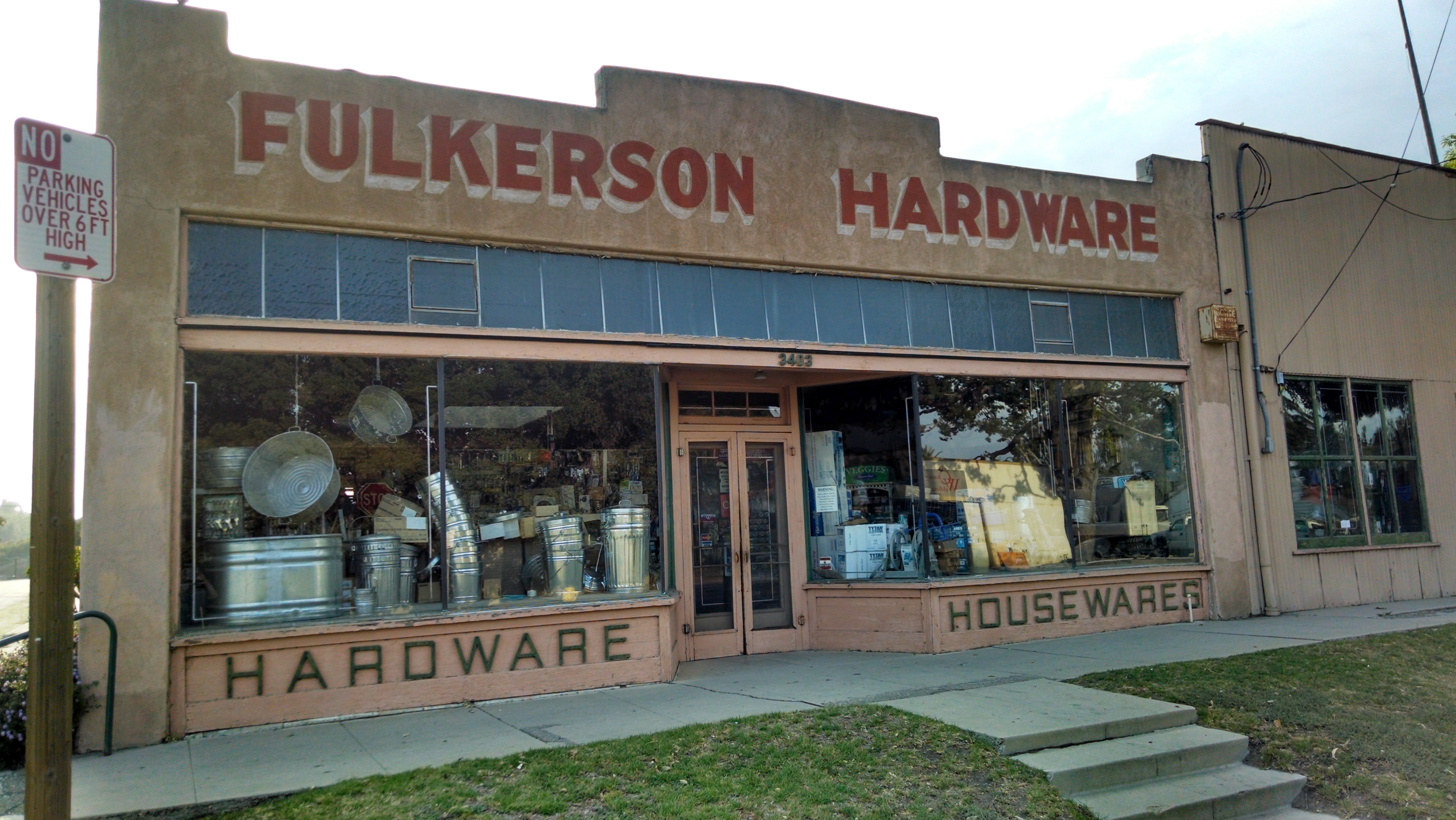
- Fulkerson Hardware has a long history of serving this agricultural community.

- Location within the state of California Somis, California (the United States)
- Coordinates: 34°15′55″N 118°59′54″W
- Country: United States
- State: California
- County: Ventura
- Established: 1892

Area
  - Total: 3.353 sq mi (8.68 km^{2})
  - Land: 3.353 sq mi (8.68 km^{2})
  - Water: 0 sq mi (0 km^{2})
- Elevation: 345 ft (105 m)

Population (2020)
  - Total: 1,429
  - Density: 426.2/sq mi (164.6/km^{2})
- Time zone: UTC-8 (Pacific (PST))
  - Summer (DST): UTC-7 (PDT)
- ZIP codes: 93066
- Area code: 805
- GNIS feature IDs: 2807036 1670906

Somis (/ˈsoʊmɪs/; Chumash: Śo Mís) is an unincorporated community and census designated place (CDP) in Ventura County, California, United States. It was established in 1892 by Thomas Bard and D.T. Perkins on a portion of the Rancho Las Posas Mexican land grant. Somis is in the Las Posas Valley on the south bank of Fox Barranca, just west of Arroyo Las Posas. For statistical purposes, the United States Census Bureau has defined Somis as a census-designated place (CDP).

As of the 2020 census, Somis had a population of 1,429.

== Toponomy ==
The name of this townsite is derived from the Chumash term śo mís, meaning 'water of the scrub oak.' There was a Ranchería named Somes noted in records from 1795 and 1796. Somes was located in the vicinity of present-day Lake Casitas, prior to the dam being built.

== History ==
Like many of the farms on the adjacent Oxnard Plain, the crops of corn, wheat and barley grown here were shipped through the wharf that had been constructed in Hueneme in 1871. Agricultural products were able to be shipped by rail when the line from Los Angeles to San Francisco was routed through the valley and a stop was established adjacent to the community. The current spelling of the name was established when the railroad came through in 1899.

== Geography ==
The Census Bureau definition of the area does not precisely correspond to the local understanding of the historical area of the community. Several structures have been designated County of Ventura Landmarks.

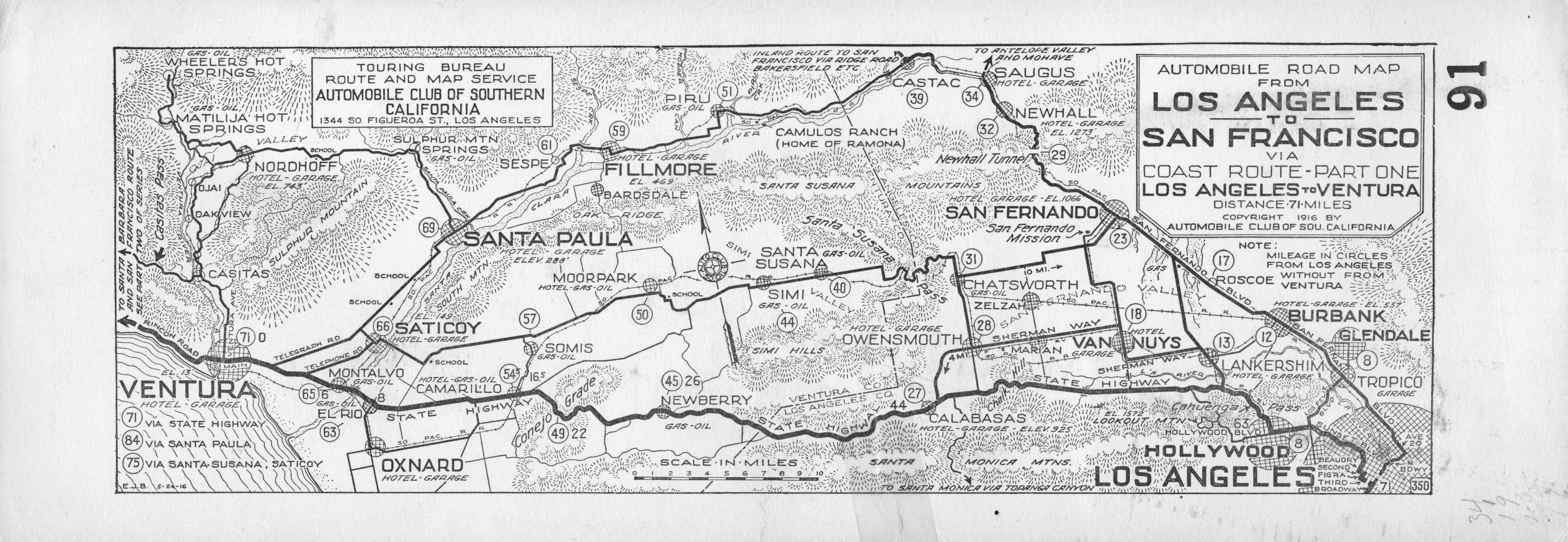
Gas and oil were available in Somis for automobile travelers according to this 1916 highway map.

Shown as Central Avenue on the original plat filed by Bard, Somis Road runs in a north-south direction through the middle of the townsite as its main thoroughfare. The parallel roads on either side are named West Street and East Street. Three streets are oriented in an east-west direction. The most northerly, named North Street, was extended northwesterly with plats filed in 1948 and 1953 that subdivided additional town lots. No further subdivision of town lots has occurred after this post-World War II expansion of the townsite to 96 acres (39 ha).

It is primarily an agricultural area, but is home to a hardware store, a market with a Mexican cafe, a post office, an elementary school, several shops, a small animal hospital, one main residential tract and numerous estates and ranches. It has no formal local government, but it is serviced by the Ventura County Sheriff's Department and the Ventura County Fire Department.

The Somis ZIP Code, 93066, includes a large area of surrounding agricultural lands bounded on the south by the edge of housing tracts in Camarillo and on the north by the ridge line of South Mountain, 6 miles (9.7 km) north of Los Angeles Avenue. The ZIP Code encompasses an area some 11 miles (18 km) in width in the east-west direction. Forbes Magazine ranked Somis the 108th most-expensive ZIP code in the United States in 2015. Somis had the highest median home prices in Ventura County in 1999.

=== Climate ===
This region experiences warm (but not hot) and dry summers, with no average monthly temperatures above 71.6 °F (22.0 °C). According to the Köppen Climate Classification system, Somis has a warm-summer Mediterranean climate, abbreviated "Csb" on climate maps.

== Education ==
Somis Union School District and the Oxnard Union High School District include the census-designated place.

The Somis Union School District operates Somis Elementary School.

== Infrastructure ==
Somis Road (SR 34), the main thoroughfare, is lined with a few shops, businesses and a county fire station and intersects State Route 118 (Los Angeles Avenue) just north of town after crossing Fox Barranca. The railroad, which is parallel with Los Angeles Avenue between Somis and Moorpark, turns and becomes parallel with Somis Road at the south end of town where they located the railroad stop for shipping agricultural products. The tracks continue south to the Camarillo Station and the intersection with US 101. Somis Road becomes Lewis Road a little over 1 mile (1.6 km) south of town at the northern boundary of the City of Camarillo which is also generally the southerly boundary of Rancho Las Posas.

The Camarillo station is the nearest stop for Amtrak and Metrolink trains and is served by Amtrak's Pacific Surfliner from San Luis Obispo to San Diego and Metrolink's Ventura County Line from Los Angeles Union Station to East Ventura.

== Demographics ==
Historical population
Census	Pop.	Note	%±
2020	1,429		—
U.S. Decennial Census; 1850–1870 1880-1890; 1900 1910 1920; 1930 1940 1950; 1960 1970 1980; 1990 2000 2010

Somis first appeared as a census designated place in the 2020 census.

=== 2020 census ===
As of the 2020 census, Somis had a population of 1,429. The population density was 426.2 inhabitants per square mile (164.6/km^{2}). The median age was 42.5 years. The age distribution was 297 people (20.8%) under the age of 18, 110 people (7.7%) aged 18 to 24, 335 people (23.4%) aged 25 to 44, 386 people (27.0%) aged 45 to 64, and 301 people (21.1%) who were 65 years of age or older. For every 100 females, there were 102.1 males, and for every 100 females age 18 and over, there were 96.5 males age 18 and over.

0.0% of residents lived in urban areas, while 100.0% lived in rural areas.

The whole population lived in households. There were 472 households, of which 157 (33.3%) had children under the age of 18 living in them, 315 (66.7%) were married-couple households, 14 (3.0%) were cohabiting couple households, 76 (16.1%) had a female householder with no spouse or partner present, and 67 (14.2%) had a male householder with no spouse or partner present. About 60 households (12.7%) were made up of individuals, and 30 (6.4%) had someone living alone who was 65 years of age or older. The average household size was 3.03. There were 393 families (83.3% of all households).

There were 497 housing units at an average density of 148.2 units per square mile (57.2 units/km^{2}), of which 472 (95.0%) were occupied and 25 (5.0%) were vacant. Of the occupied units, 325 (68.9%) were owner-occupied and 147 (31.1%) were occupied by renters. The homeowner vacancy rate was 0.6% and the rental vacancy rate was 5.8%.

Racial composition as of the 2020 census
Race	Number	Percent
White	932	65.2%
Black or African American	13	0.9%
American Indian and Alaska Native	24	1.7%
Asian	55	3.8%
Native Hawaiian and Other Pacific Islander	0	0.0%
Some other race	174	12.2%
Two or more races	231	16.2%
Hispanic or Latino (of any race)	424	29.7%
