= Ufton Nervet rail crash =

2004 rail crash in Berkshire, England

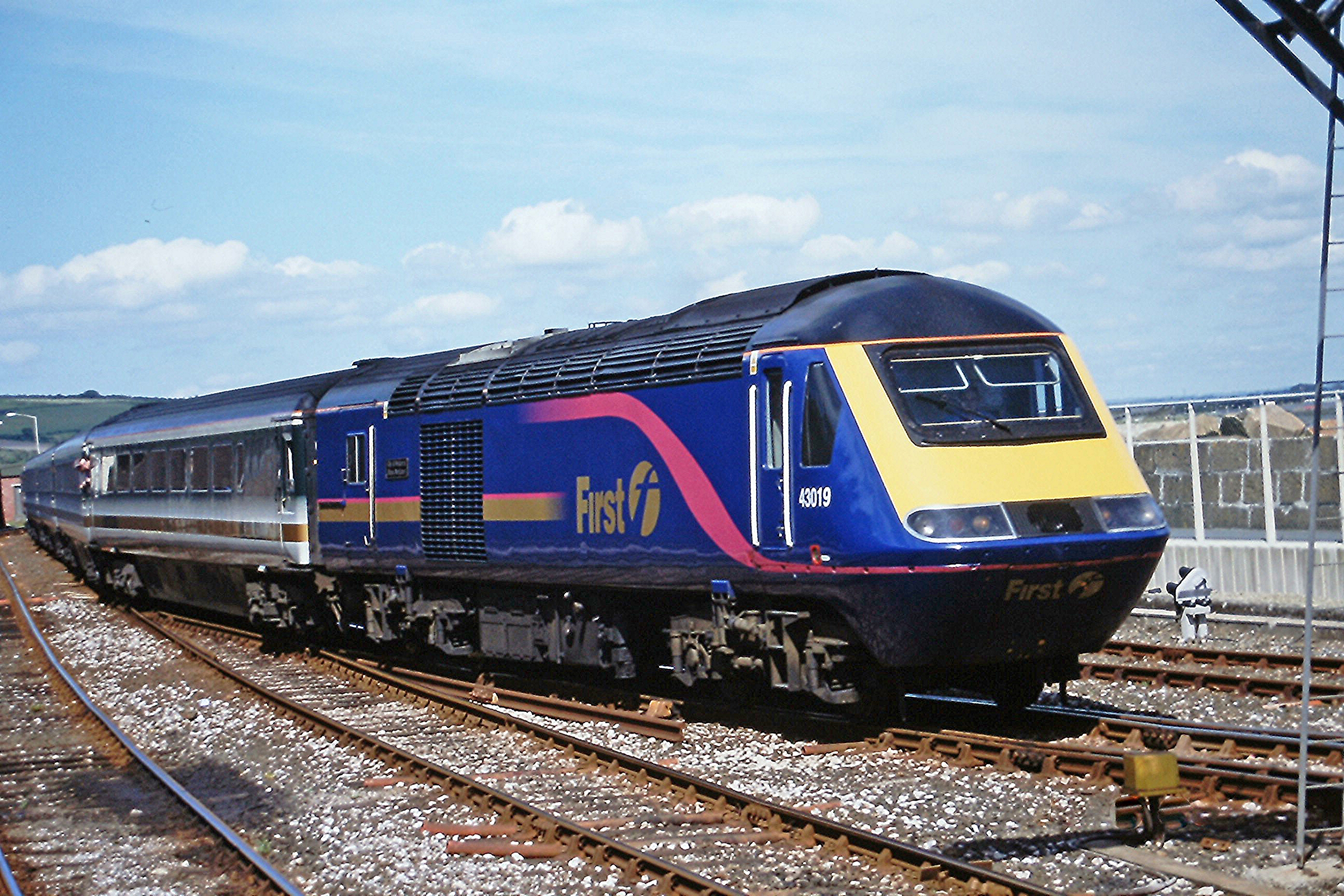
- 43019, the locomotive leading the derailed HST, pictured in 2003

Details
- Date: 6 November 2004; 18:12 GMT
- Location: Ufton Nervet, Berkshire
- Coordinates: 51°24′53″N 1°06′54″W
- Country: United Kingdom
- Line: Reading to Taunton Line
- Operator: First Great Western
- Service: 17:35 London Paddington to Plymouth
- Cause: Obstruction on line

Statistics
- Trains: 1
- Passengers: 200–300
- Deaths: 7 (including the perpetrator)
- Injured: 120

The Ufton Nervet rail crash occurred on 6 November 2004 when a passenger train collided with a stationary car on a level crossing on the Reading–Taunton line near Ufton Nervet, Berkshire, England. The collision derailed the train, and seven people—including the drivers of the train and the car—were killed. An inquest found that all railway personnel and systems were operating correctly, and the crash was caused by the suicide of the car driver.

The crash led to the Rail Safety and Standards Board investigating whether safety could be improved with the introduction of laminated or toughened glass or seat belts; the report found that laminated glass may improve "passenger containment" in the event of an incident. It recommended against the introduction of seat belts as the findings showed that they would introduce more injuries in most incidents.

In the 10 years after the crash, four further fatal incidents took place on the level crossing and a near-miss occurred when a train traversed the crossing without the barriers lowered. The level crossing was closed and replaced by a road bridge in 2016.

== Background ==
=== Ufton Nervet level crossing ===
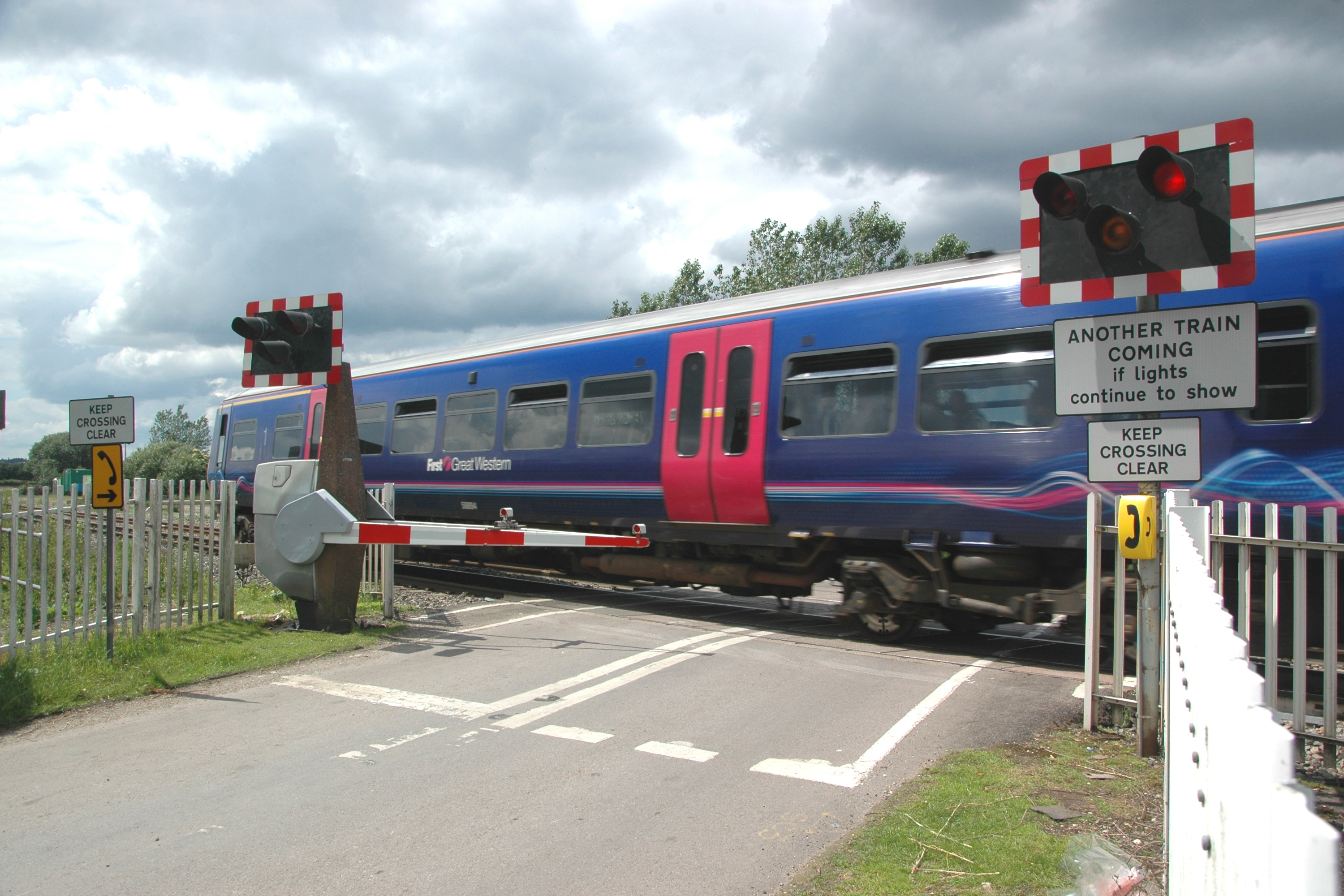
Ufton Nervet automatic half barrier crossing, pictured in 2012

Ufton Nervet level crossing was an automatic half-barrier level crossing (AHBC) situated on the Reading–Taunton branch of the Great Western Main Line between Theale and Aldermaston stations in Berkshire. In the United Kingdom, AHBCs are used on roads where traffic is unlikely to block the crossing and where the line speed is not more than 100 miles per hour (160 km/h). Ufton Nervet AHBC was situated on Ufton Lane, an unclassified road connecting the A4 (between Reading and Newbury) with the village of Ufton Nervet. The railway at the crossing is surrounded by fields, and was a short distance from the A4. Approximately 100 yards (91 m) beyond the crossing is a set of points where a goods loop departs the main line.

When the barriers are lowered at AHBCs, they extend only across the entrances to the crossing, leaving the exits clear. The crossing sequence—comprising flashing lights, alarms, and the barriers—is triggered automatically by approaching trains when they activate a treadle known as the strike-in point. The time given for the train to approach the crossing is dictated by the speed of the line and is sufficient to allow road users to clear the crossing; the minimum time permitted for this is 27 seconds. At Ufton Nervet, the strike-in point was 1,907 yards (1,744 m) from the crossing, which gave 39 seconds for trains travelling at the line speed of 100 miles per hour (160 km/h). The crossing was located after a slight right-hand bend, and the maximum visibility of the crossing for drivers on the down line was 640 yards (585 m); a train travelling at line speed would cover this distance in 13 seconds.

=== Car driver ===
The car driver was Brian Drysdale, a 48-year-old chef at Wokefield Park, approximately 7 miles (11 km) from Ufton Nervet. He was concerned about the upcoming results from a recent HIV test, (Note: Drysdale's HIV test result came back negative the week after the collision.) thinking that he had contracted the virus from a relationship in the late 1990s and possibly believing that he had developed AIDS. He spoke to NHS Direct in the week preceding his death, saying that he had had suicidal thoughts and thought he was having a nervous breakdown. On 6 November 2004, Drysdale tried four times to telephone the clinic who were testing him for HIV, but it was closed for the weekend. That day he left work at 17:30 GMT and drove to the level crossing.

=== Train and crew ===
The train involved in the crash was the 17:35 First Great Western (FGW) service from London Paddington to Plymouth, carrying headcode 1C92. The train consisted of ten vehicles—the leading Class 43 power car (43019; City of Swansea / Dinas Abertawe), eight passenger coaches, and a trailing Class 43 power car (43029). It was driven by Stan Martin, who had been a train driver for 30 years.

Three further crew members were aboard the train—two train managers and a customer host serving in the buffet car.

== Collision ==
On 6 November 2004, the train departed Paddington on time at 17:35, making its first scheduled stop at Reading before departing one minute late at 18:03. After clearing speed restrictions at Southcote Junction on the down line, the train accelerated towards the line speed of 100 miles per hour (160 km/h).

Immediately preceding the collision, an off-duty Thames Valley Police officer happened upon Drysdale manoeuvring his Mazda 323 between the barriers on the level crossing before switching off the lights and ignition. Drysdale appeared to ignore the officer, who was flashing his headlights and sounding his horn. At 18:11, the train reached the strike-in point, triggering the crossing sequence. The police officer attempted to use the emergency telephone.

Travelling at 98 miles per hour (158 km/h), Martin applied the emergency brake 2–3 seconds before the collision. At 18:12, the train collided with the car. The impact trapped the car's engine block beneath the train's leading axle, lifting the wheelset and causing the bogie to yaw. This in turn made wheel flanges climb and derail. The train continued upright for 91 metres (299 ft) until it reached a set of points at the start of a loop, causing a "catastrophic derailment" of all vehicles. The leading power car came to rest on its side 360 metres (1,180 ft) beyond the point of derailment. The passenger carriages were at varying angles relative to both the vertical and the direction of travel, and the third passenger carriage (coach F) had been folded horizontally around a bogie that had embedded in the embankment.

Approximate plan of the aftermath of the rail crash. The train had been travelling on the down line towards Plymouth when it was derailed.

Six people were killed at the scene: Drysdale, Martin, and four passengers. Passengers were ejected through broken windows, including at least two (and as many as four) of the fatalities. All of the passengers who were killed—as well as the majority of those who sustained non-fatal injuries—had been travelling in coaches D and E.

=== Response and aftermath ===
The police officer who witnessed the incident called 999 and was able to accurately describe the location to emergency services. He could not see the train in the darkness, but using a torch was able to see the wreckage of the car in the downside cess, as well as Drysdale's body, which had been ejected from the car and was 30 feet (9 m) from the point of collision. The officer continued along the track where passengers were leaving the wreckage via broken windows and using mobile phones to see in the dark. One of the train managers attempted to use a lineside signal post telephone, but the cables had been damaged in the derailment. At 18:21, he used his mobile phone to contact the Integrated Electronic Control Centre in Swindon. He then contacted the other train manager, who informed him that he had deployed track-circuit operating clips.

The first fire appliance arrived at the scene at 18:25, the first ambulance at 18:31, and representatives from Thames Valley Police and the British Transport Police both at 18:35. In total, the scene was attended by 180 police officers, 84 fire crew, 50 ambulance crew, and 36 doctors and paramedics. Crews arrived in 22 fire appliances and 25 ambulances.

Between 200 and 300 passengers were estimated to have been on board. Of these, 120 were injured, 71 admitted to hospital, and 18 described as having serious injuries. Minor injuries were initially treated at the nearby Winning Hand pub, and casualties were admitted to Basingstoke Hospital and the Royal Berkshire Hospital in Reading. A seventh person, a passenger, died in hospital the day after the crash.

Removal of the train began on 9 November. The railway was closed until 16 November, with local services being replaced by rail replacement bus services and longer-distance services travelling from Reading to Westbury via Swindon. After the reopening of the line, a temporary speed restriction was in force to allow bedding-in of the new track ballast. Leading car 43019 was written off in the collision and was scrapped. Trailing power car 43029 sustained only minor damage and was later returned to service, eventually being renamed Caldicot Castle.

== Investigation and inquest ==
An investigation was carried out by Thames Valley Police and British Transport Police, and reports were prepared by the Health and Safety Executive.

The Rail Safety and Standards Board (RSSB) published a preliminary report on 1 February 2005 which stated that there was no evidence that maintenance condition of the train contributed to the derailment, and there was no evidence that Network Rail or First Great Western staff were deficient in their fitness for duty. The investigation found that the automatic half-barrier equipment and its ancillary equipment were properly maintained, in good condition, and operated correctly at the time of the incident. The track had been surveyed by a track geometry car 15 days prior to the incident, and all aspects of track geometry were found to be compliant. It was reported that Martin was driving the train in accordance with normal operating procedures. The report found that the loss of lighting in all coaches following the crash made passengers' orientation and egress difficult.

The RSSB report concluded that while converting the crossing to a CCTV-monitored crossing would lower risk of annual fatalities from 1 in 88,000 to 1 in 760,000, the value of the estimated safety benefits was significantly lower than the £1 million cost of the conversion works. The risk of 1 in 88,000 was deemed to be tolerable provided measures were in place to ensure the risk was as low as reasonably practicable. The report made recommendations including improving emergency communications at the level crossing and moving a set of points whose position was a factor in the train's derailment. Network Rail implemented all the safety recommendations. The RSSB subsequently undertook research into improving seat and table design on board passenger carriages, as well as the effect of two-point seat belts on minimising passenger injuries during incidents. The report concluded that two-point seat belts would cause more injury to passengers in the majority of incidents, and the RSSB recommended they were not installed. Later studies drew a similar conclusion with three-point seat belts.

On 1 June 2005 it was announced that an inquest into the crash would be held at Windsor Guildhall. The inquest, due to open on 17 October 2005, was delayed because of a dispute over whether the families of the victims should be given legal aid. The inquest finally began in October 2007, after Mr Justice Owen overturned Bridget Prentice's original decision to deny legal aid. The jury heard the testimony of the police officer witness, who stated that Drysdale did not appear to be acting with any urgency; he believed that the crash was caused by a suicide attempt. A forensic investigator told the inquest that he had been able to determine that the car had been parked on the level crossing with its engine and lights switched off. Its fuel tank still contained petrol, which the inquest heard suggested that the car had not broken down. The inquest was told that Martin died from suffocation, and the other fatalities were caused by serious head and chest injuries.

During the inquest, David Main—whose partner and daughter were killed—said that "trains are not safe [...] If laminated glass had been fitted they wouldn't have been [ejected from the carriage]". The RSSB conducted an R&D programme into requirements for train windows; their report identified that although broken windows resulted in passengers being ejected from carriages at Ufton Nervet, the ability to break windows after an incident is crucial for passengers to escape. A 2007 report stated that the introduction of laminated glass would provide "significantly better passenger containment protection in accidents" than toughened glass. In a consultation with emergency services it was established that laminated glass would still allow rescuers to access trapped passengers.

In 2007 the Rail Accident Investigation Branch (RAIB) described how the absence of an obstacle deflector on the leading power car, as well as the presence of the traction motor and gearbox on its leading axle, increased the likelihood of debris becoming caught beneath the axle. This likelihood was increased by the collision occurring at a level crossing, where the deck surface is level with the rail head.

The county coroner stated that Drysdale's mental health was a "key clue to the cause of the tragedy" and the results of a psychological analysis would play an "active part" in explaining why he parked his car on the crossing. On 1 November 2007 the inquest returned the verdict that the crash was caused by Drysdale's suicide, and that those aboard the train were unlawfully killed. Drysdale was not under the influence of alcohol or drugs. The coroner described the incident as "a unique set of circumstances that had resulted in catastrophic consequences".

== Subsequent events ==
=== Royal Humane Society awards ===
In 2005 the Royal Humane Society awarded its bronze medal to two passengers who had assisted those injured and trapped after the crash, as well as having found two of the fatalities. The two men found nine-year-old Louella Main and the body of her mother Anjanette Rossi; both had been ejected from the train during the crash. At the inquest, one of the men testified that on finding Main she had a visible head injury and a faint pulse, but died from her injuries. One of the men found a clergyman who had been a passenger on the train, and got him to walk back to the bodies to say a prayer.

=== Memorials ===
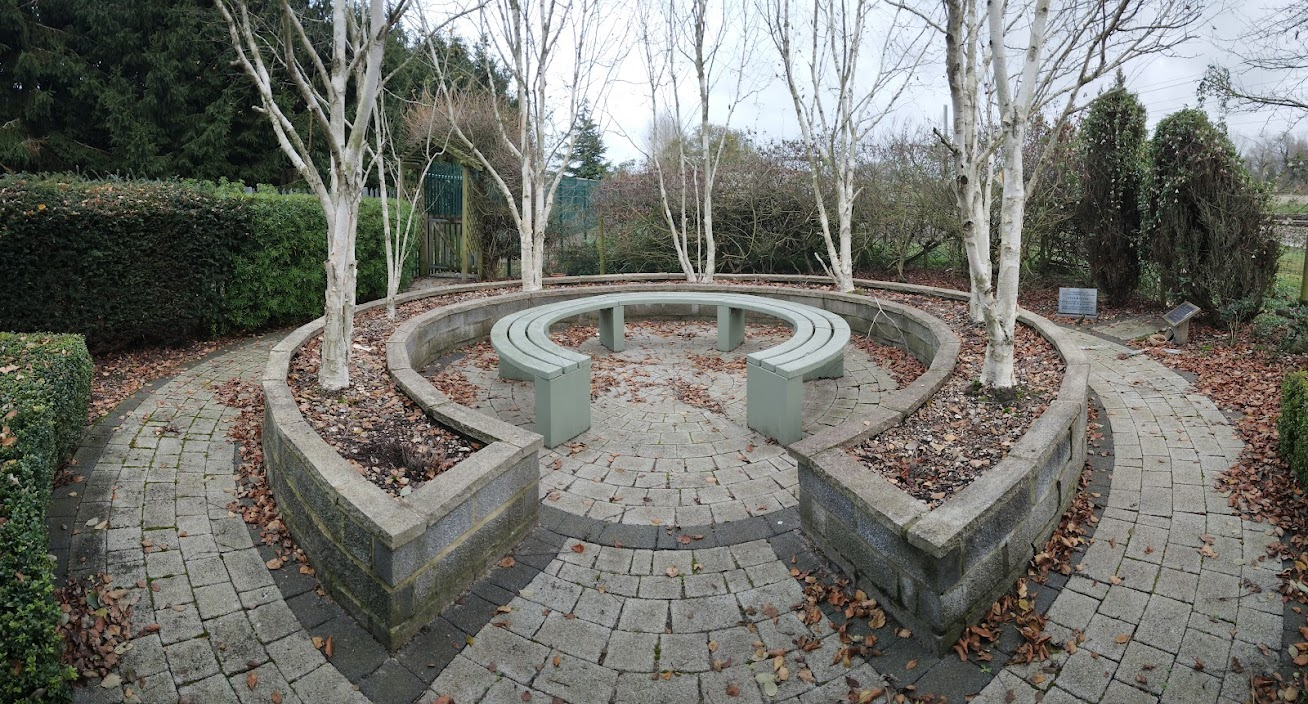
The memorial garden, pictured in 2022

The Ufton Memorial Garden was dedicated to everyone affected by the collision. A plaque at the memorial reads "For all those affected by the catastrophic derailment of the First Great Western 17.35 Paddington to Plymouth train on 6 November 2004 [...] One event, many realities". Originally located on the south side of the railway line, the garden was relocated and joined with one dedicated to Martin when preparatory work for the road bridge began in 2015.

First Great Western named power car 43139 Driver Stan Martin 5 June 1950 – 6 November 2004 as a tribute. When 43139 was acquired by ScotRail in 2019, the name was transferred to GWR's 43198 alongside that of driver Brian Cooper who died in the 1999 Ladbroke Grove rail crash.

=== Further incidents ===
There were fatal incidents at the crossing in 2009, 2010, 2012, and 2014. The 2010 death was found not suspicious. The coroner's inquest into the 2012 death recorded an open verdict as there was insufficient evidence to be certain that that fatality was the result of suicide. The 2012 collision also caused injury to the InterCity 125 driver. The circumstances surrounding the 2014 fatality were not treated as suspicious.

There was a near miss on 4 September 2011, when a train passed the crossing at 61 miles per hour (98 km/h) without the barriers lowered or the lights illuminated. The driver, having seen a car on the lane, applied the emergency brake and stopped the train 520 yards (480 m) beyond the crossing. The RAIB investigated the cause, and found that the crossing was being operated locally by a level crossing attendant who had not received instruction from the signaller (at Thames Valley Signalling Centre in Didcot) to close the crossing. The report concluded that the incident was likely a result of work overload on the signaller.

== Level crossing closure and replacement bridge ==
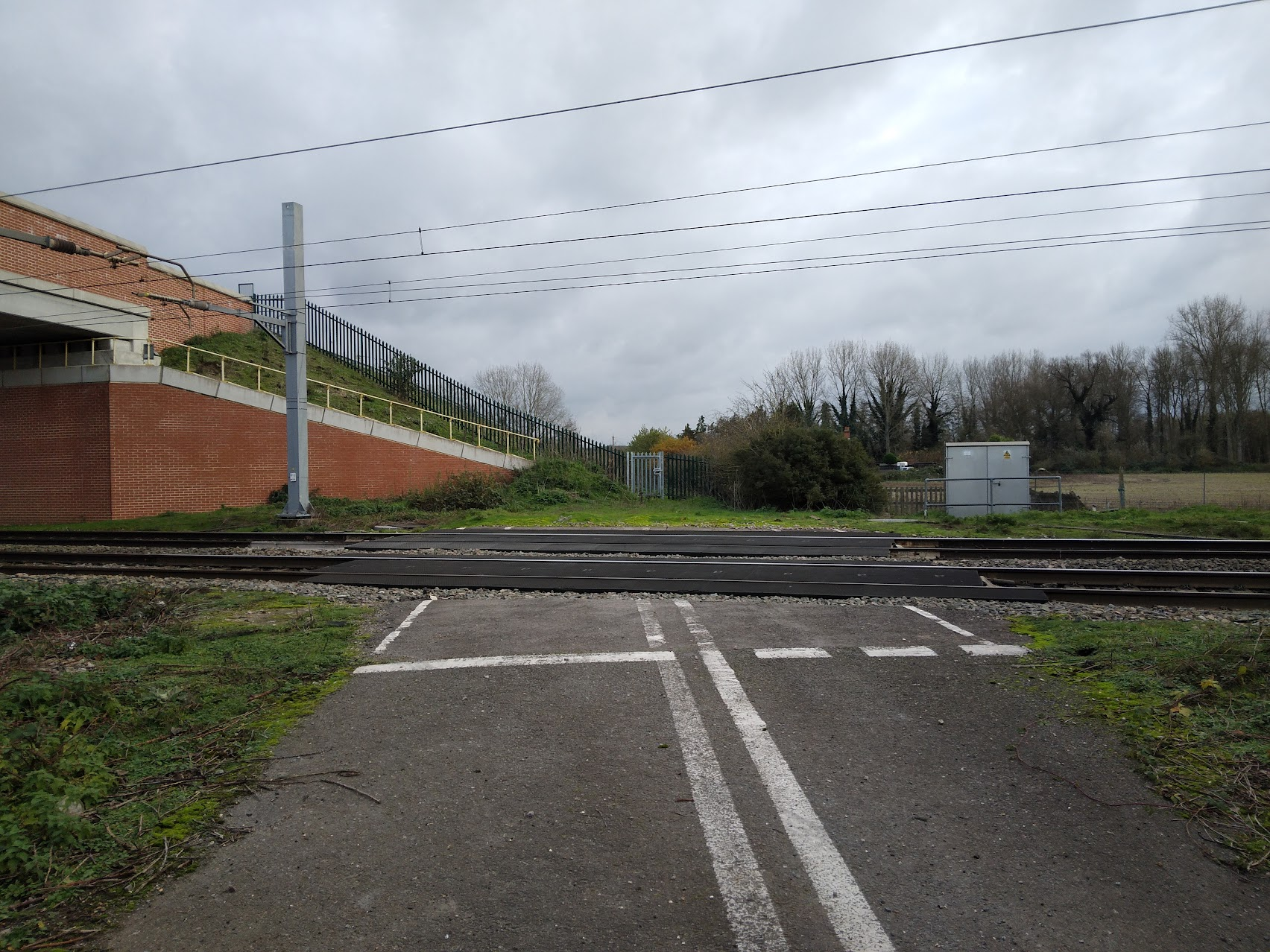
The site of the level crossing and replacement road bridge (left) pictured in 2022

Her Majesty's Railway Inspectorate's (HMRI) annual report, published in September 2004, had identified that level crossings "contribute[d] the greatest potential for catastrophic risk on the railways" and said that crossings were being gradually removed with no new ones being installed except in "exceptional circumstances". It expressed a desire for crossings to be banned, with both Network Rail and the Health and Safety Executive (of which HMRI was part) hoping for them to be phased out. After the crash, former British Rail Operations Manager Peter Rayner said that AHBCs were "normally extremely safe" and that accidents are caused by the reckless disregard of signals and bypassing barriers. Following the 2011 near-miss incident, the National Union of Rail, Maritime and Transport Workers (RMT) said that AHBCs are prohibited in some countries as unsafe, and that "level crossings on high speed train lines should be banned and replaced with bridges [or] underpasses".

In July 2012, Network Rail announced that the crossing was due for renewal and it was considering either a like-for-like replacement, converting the crossing to full barriers, or installing a bridge. On the tenth anniversary of the 2004 incident, and shortly after the 2014 fatality, the RMT repeated calls for the crossing to be made safe "[with] no more delays". In April 2015, Network Rail submitted plans for a replacement road bridge; West Berkshire Council approved these in August and preparatory work began in September. Construction began in April 2016, and the bridge was officially opened on 16 December 2016. The site of the old crossing was converted for use as a Road Rail Access Point (RRAP) for rail maintenance vehicles to access the railway.

== See also ==
- List of rail accidents in the United Kingdom
- 2005 Glendale train crash, in Los Angeles, caused by a driver leaving a vehicle on the tracks, killing 11 people.
