= 2015 Oxnard train derailment =

2015 rail transport disaster in Oxnard, California, USA

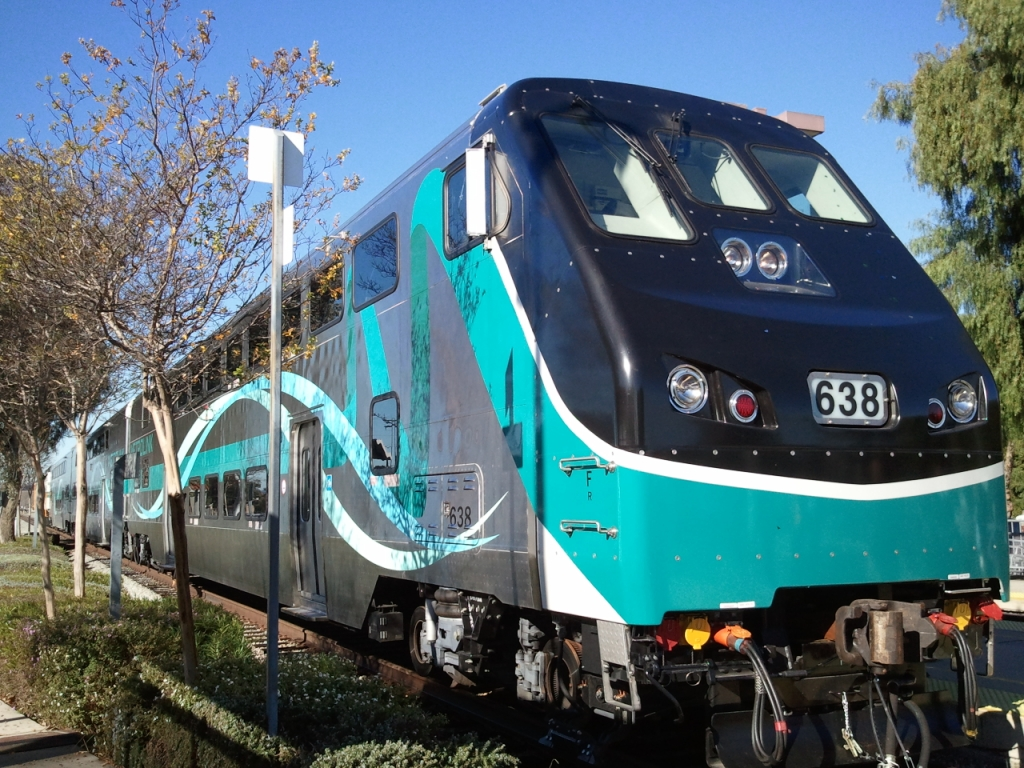
- A Metrolink train similar to the one involved in the accident.

Details
- Date: February 24, 2015; 5:44 a.m. local time (13:44 UTC)
- Location: Oxnard, California
- Coordinates: 34°11′50″N 119°08′32″W
- Country: United States
- Line: Ventura County Line
- Operator: Metrolink
- Incident type: Road crossing collision
- Cause: Truck driver mistakenly turning onto railroad tracks

Statistics
- Trains: 1
- Vehicles: 2
- Passengers: 51
- Crew: 3
- Deaths: 1
- Injured: 33

The 2015 Oxnard train derailment occurred on February 24, 2015, at 5:44 a.m. local time when a Metrolink passenger train collided with a truck that a driver had mistakenly turned from Rice Avenue (SR 1) onto the tracks and became stuck. After the impact, the train derailed at Oxnard, California, United States. As a result of the crash, the train engineer died from his injuries a week later, and 32 passengers and crew members were injured. The truck driver exited his vehicle and ran from the scene before the crash; he sustained minor injuries that were unrelated to the crash sequence.

== Background ==
The accident happened along the Coast Line owned by the Union Pacific Railroad (UP). This portion of the railroad runs parallel to East Fifth Street (designated California State Route 34 (SR 34)) between Camarillo and Oxnard. Besides Metrolink, Amtrak passenger trains and UP freight trains use the line. An average of eight passenger and 24 freight trains use the line in each direction each day. At the Rice Avenue (SR 1) at-grade crossing, where this collision occurred, emergency crews had previously pulled vehicles off the tracks about 18 times. A bridge to allow Rice Avenue to pass over the tracks had been planned for almost two decades, however, funding remained unavailable in Ventura County for the estimated $35 million grade separation project.

== Accident ==
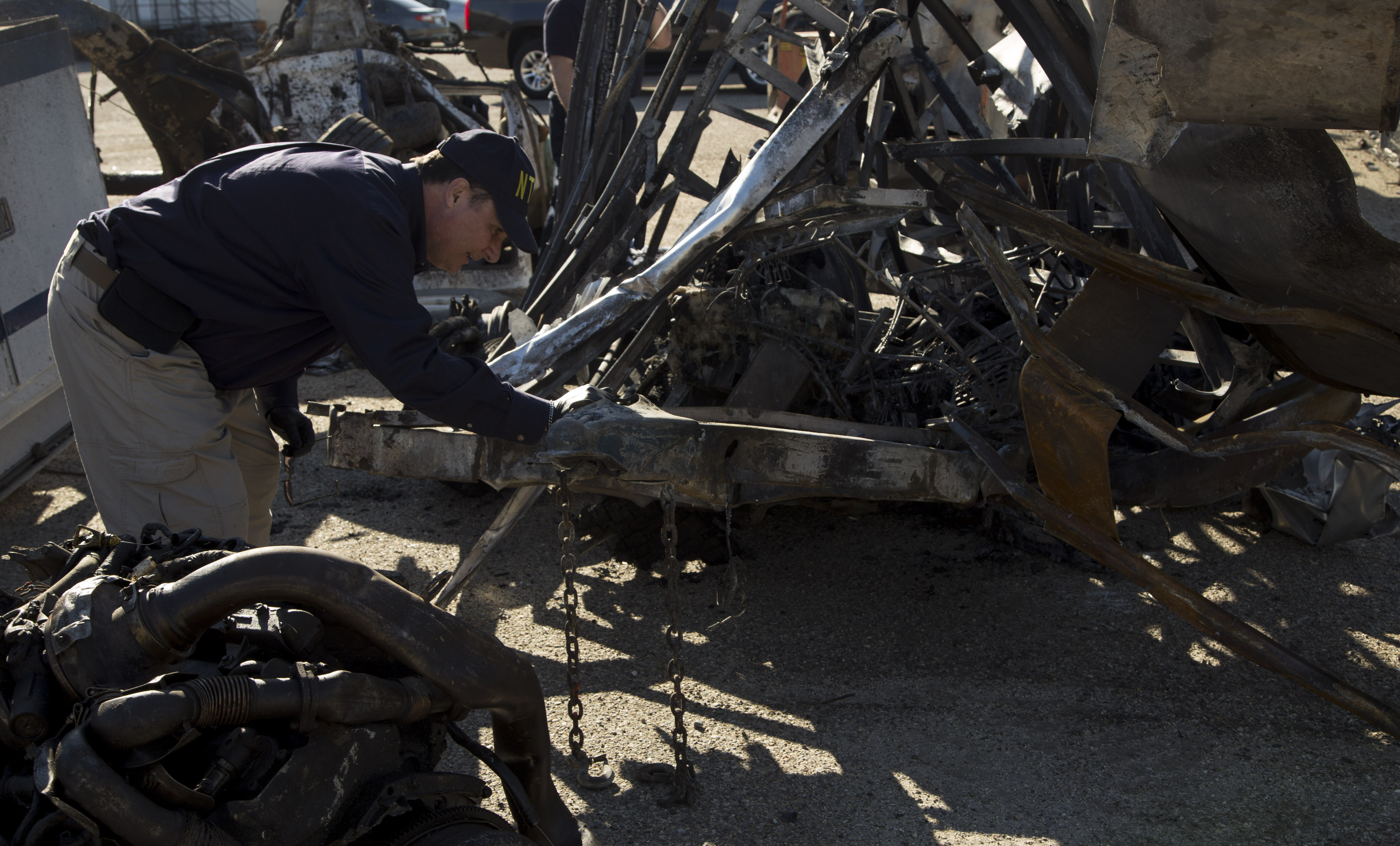
NTSB investigator examines wreckage

On Tuesday, February 24, 2015, in the predawn hours, Metrolink commuter train #102, operated by Amtrak, was en route from Ventura County, California to Los Angeles. As the train approached the South Rice Avenue (SR 1) grade crossing in Oxnard at 5:44 a.m. local time (13:44 UTC), it collided with a 2005 Ford F-450 pick-up truck that was towing a 2000 Wells Cargo two-axle utility trailer.

The truck driver, 54-year-old Jose Alejandro Sanchez-Ramirez, who was unfamiliar with the area and was “acutely fatigued” at the time of the incident, intended to turn right onto East Fifth Street (SR 34) from South Rice Avenue but mistakenly turned onto the UP tracks, and the truck became lodged on the track about 80 feet (24 m) west of the grade crossing. The driver attempted to push the truck off the track. He also stated that he tried to call 911 but was in a state of panic and could not do so. At some point before the arrival of the train, he exited the truck, leaving the headlights and hazard lights on and the driver door open. Based on an analysis of GPS data obtained from the driver’s cell phone, about 12 minutes elapsed between the time the truck became lodged on the tracks and the collision with the train.

The train was led by a Hyundai Rotem cab/coach car #645 (a nonpowered coach car with a compartment from which the engineer can control the train), followed by Bombardier BiLevel coach car #206, Hyundai Rotem coach cars 211 and 263, and EMD F59PH diesel-electric locomotive #870 at the rear. It was occupied by three crew members (an engineer, a student engineer, and a conductor) and 51 passengers. The train was traveling from East Ventura to Los Angeles. It was accelerating after leaving the Oxnard station 2 miles (3.2 km) away from the crash site. Passenger trains are permitted to travel at up to 79 miles per hour (127 km/h) on the section of track where the crash occurred. Before the accident, the train was traveling at 64 miles per hour (103 km/h) when the emergency brakes were applied and had slowed to 56 miles per hour (90 km/h) when it hit the truck.

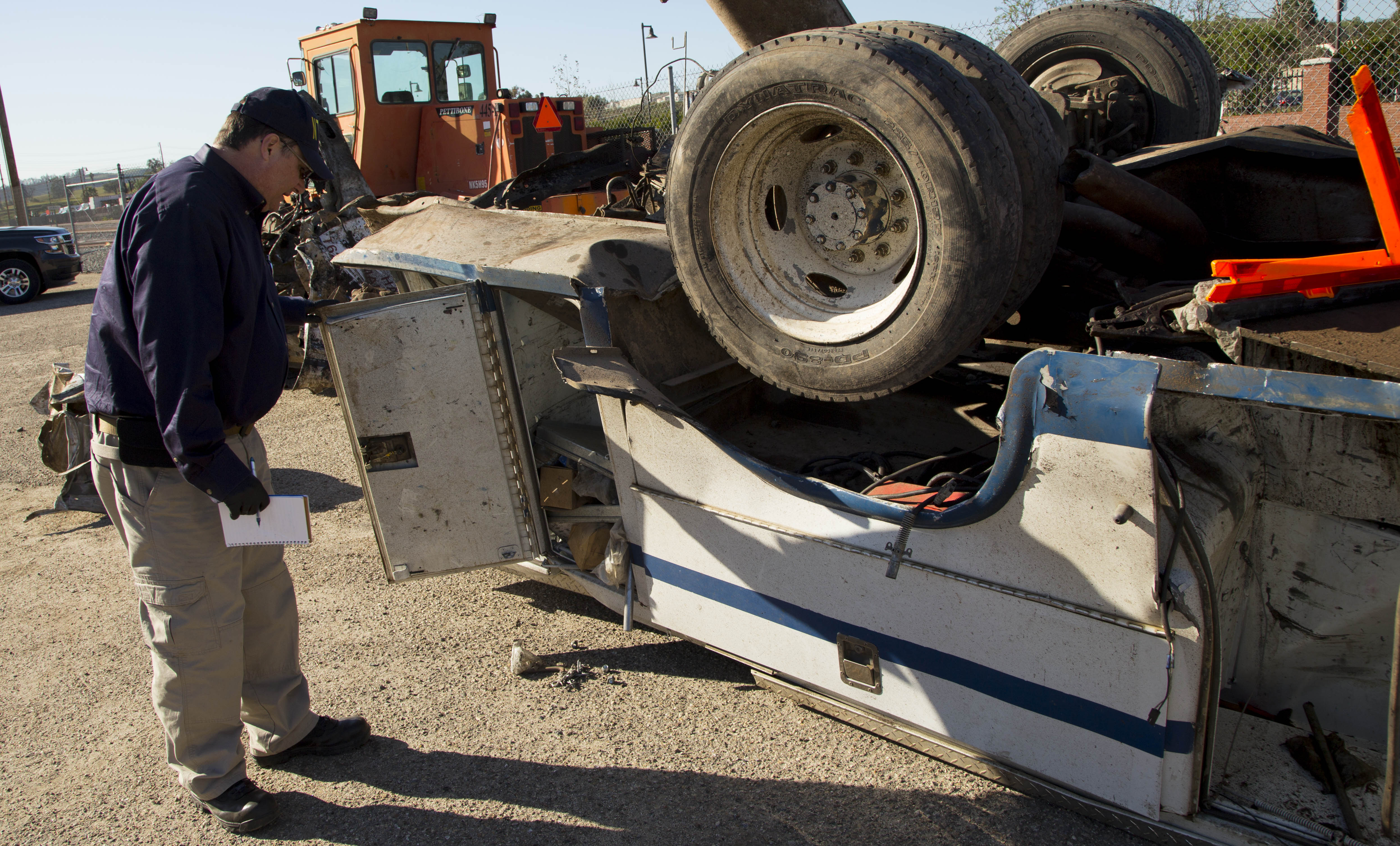
NTSB investigator examines truck involved in the crash

After striking the truck and trailer, the train continued through the grade crossing, where all four-passenger cars subsequently derailed, and three rolled over on their sides. The locomotive did not derail. The truck was pushed along the track and came to rest about 130 feet (40 m) east of the grade crossing on the south side of the track bed. The trailer detached from the truck and came to rest on the grade crossing, where a post-crash fire consumed it. Debris from the collision caused minor damage to a 1998 Toyota Camry, which was stopped at the grade crossing, facing north, at the time of the crash.

As a result of the crash, the train engineer died, and 32 passengers and crew members were injured. 12 passengers and one crew member had injuries described as serious and were treated at Community Memorial Hospital, Los Robles Hospital & Medical Center, St. John's Regional Medical Center, St. John's Pleasant Valley Hospital, and Ventura County Medical Center. The truck driver exited his vehicle and ran from the scene before the crash; he sustained minor injuries that were unrelated to the crash sequence and was later taken into custody about a mile away. The Toyota driver was not injured.

== Investigation ==
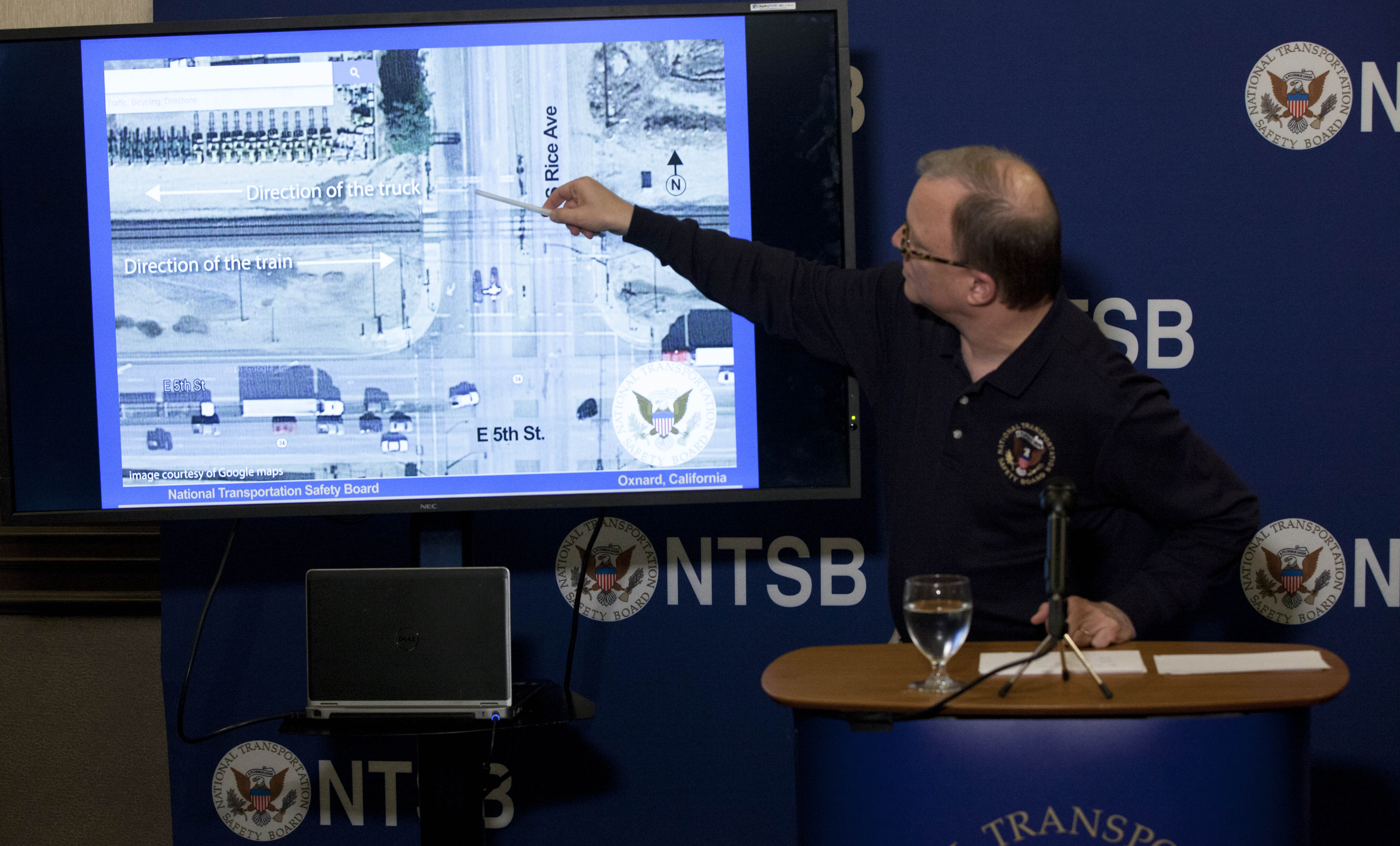
NTSB Board Member Robert Sumwalt briefs media in February 2015

The National Transportation Safety Board (NTSB) launched an investigation into the accident, and a go-team was dispatched to the scene. The train was fitted with a forward-facing camera in the cab/coach car and the camera recorded the collision itself.

The NTSB determined that the probable cause of the crash was the truck driver mistakenly turning onto the railroad right-of-way due to acute fatigue and unfamiliarity with the area. The NTSB investigation found that the crash occurred nearly 24 hours after the truck driver, Sanchez-Ramirez, reported for duty in Somerton, Arizona and 16.75 hours after he began the trip to Oxnard, well above the limits set for commercial drivers. The truck driver worked for The Growers Company but operated a vehicle owned by Harvest Management. The two companies share the same ownership and manage a farming operation. After having been off duty the day before, the driver went on duty at 5:51 a.m. on February 23. At 1:00 p.m., his employer dispatched Sanchez-Ramirez from their base in Somerton to Oxnard, a 6-hour trip. However, Sanchez-Ramirez experienced a 4.5-hour delay in Jacumba, California due to a damaged radiator, which necessitated that he obtain a replacement truck. Additionally, his truck was sideswiped by another vehicle in Los Angeles, which further extended his travel time.

The cab/coach car and two of the three coach cars were fitted with a crash energy management (CEM) system designed to dissipate kinetic energy during a collision. The cars had been purchased as part of the response to Metrolink's deadly 2005 Glendale train crash and 2008 Chatsworth train collision. The NTSB investigation determined that the CEM elements (colloquially known as "crumple zones") were not activated in the collision. The investigation further determined that welds on the train's pilot assembly (colloquially known as a "snowplow" or "cowcatcher") failed and detached from the lead cab car during the crash sequence; however, no markings or damage suggested that the pilot assembly itself interfered with the wheels of the train and caused the derailment. The railcar interiors exhibited no loss of occupant survival space, and analysis determined the primary cause of injury was the overturning of the railcars and subsequent passenger and crew impacts with hard interior surfaces.

== Aftermath ==
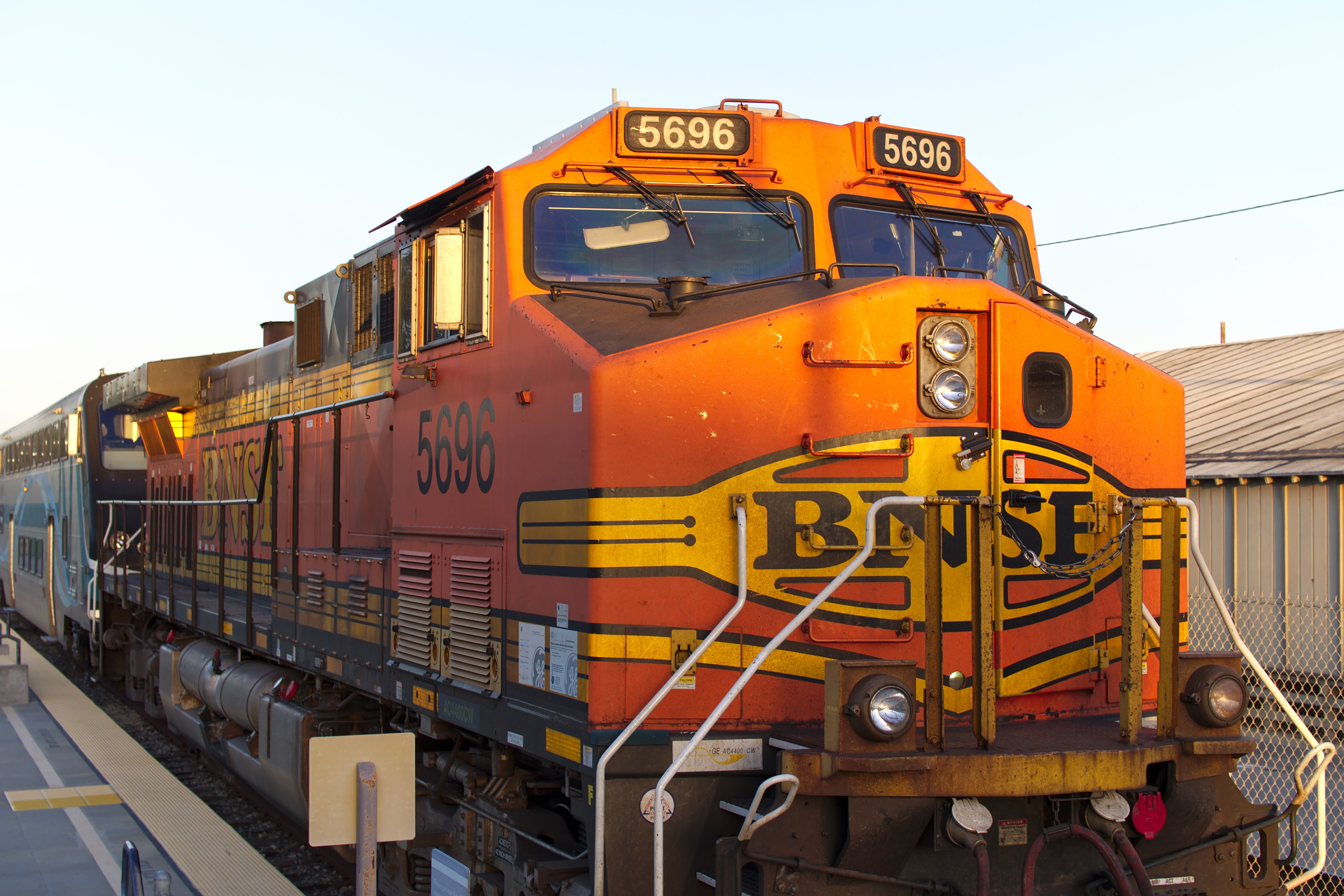
BNSF AC4400CW 5696 pulling Metrolink in the aftermath of the derailment

Immediately following the derailment, service was suspended through the accident site, and Metrolink passengers were bussed between Camarillo, Oxnard, and East Ventura stations. Amtrak Pacific Surfliner and service between Los Angeles and Goleta, that uses the same tracks, was canceled. Local roads around the scene of the accident were closed.

Service along the rail line was restored by Wednesday afternoon, with the first passenger train passing through the crash site at about 5:40 p.m.

The train engineer, Glenn Steele, 62, was critically injured and died one week later. Steele was employed by Amtrak, which provides train crews to Metrolink under contract, and at the time of his death, was the most senior engineer with Metrolink, having spent half of his 42-year-long Amtrak career with Metrolink. Steele died at Cedars-Sinai Medical Center early on March 3. A resident of Homeland, California, Steele was a grandfather.

The truck driver, Jose Alejandro Sanchez-Ramirez, 54, left the scene on foot following the accident but was later taken into custody about a mile away. According to his attorney, the man was trying to summon help in a remote part of the county without a vehicle and with no guarantee anyone he found would be able to communicate with him since he only speaks Spanish. When he finally encountered police officers, he handed them the cell phone on which he had been talking to his son so that his son could explain to the officers what had just happened to the train. He was booked on suspicion of hit and run and held on $150,000 bail, but prosecutors later declined to file criminal charges against him and he was released two days later. On February 22, 2016, Sanchez-Ramirez was charged with a misdemeanor vehicular manslaughter charge by Ventura County prosecutors. He pleaded guilty to the charge on April 25, 2019 and was sentenced on July 24 to spend 30 days in jail.

In March 2015, two of those injured due to the crash sued the truck driver, and his employer, Harvest Management LLC.

Metrolink announced on September 3, 2015, that they would restrict the use of the cab cars for at least a year as they reviewed the safety features. As a stopgap, BNSF Railway locomotives were borrowed to add a second locomotive to each train set, positioned in front of the cab car. Metrolink determined that all of the pilot assemblies on the Hyundai–Rotem cab car had not been securely attached, and on July 8, 2016, the Metrolink board approved a $1.5 million plan to repair the pilots. Metrolink sued the manufacturer a few months later, alleging faulty parts and a breach of contract and warranty. Once the repairs were completed, the cars returned to service and the leased BNSF locomotives were returned.

The bridge to allow Rice Avenue (SR 1) to pass over the tracks and SR 34, that has long been planned, had a groundbreaking in February 2025.

== See also ==
- List of grade crossing accidents
- List of rail accidents (2010–2019)
- 2005 Glendale train crash
- Valhalla train crash
