= 2005 Glendale train crash =

Train crash in California, US

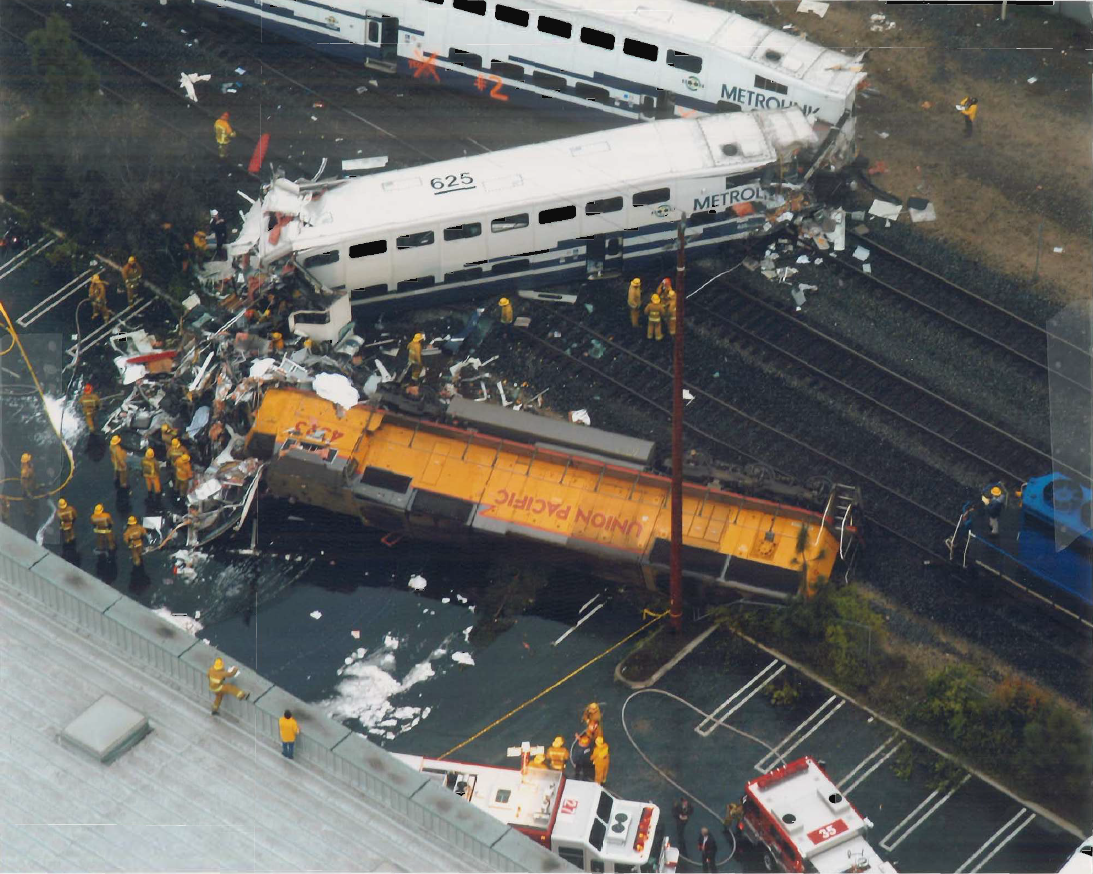
- Overhead image of the 2005 Glendale train crash, showing the aftermath after cab car 625, which led Metrolink #100, impacted with the parked Union Pacific locomotive

Details
- Date: January 26, 2005; 6:03 a.m. PST
- Location: Glendale / Los Angeles, California
- Coordinates: 34°07′48″N 118°15′48″W
- Country: United States
- Line: SCRRA Valley Subdivision
- Operator: Metrolink, Union Pacific Railroad
- Incident type: Derailment
- Cause: Vehicle intentionally parked on the tracks

Statistics
- Trains: 3
- Vehicles: 1
- Deaths: 11
- Injured: 177
Diagram

The 2005 Glendale train crash occurred on January 26, 2005, at 6:03 a.m. PST, when a Metrolink commuter train collided with a sport utility vehicle that had been parked on the tracks by a man in an industrial area of Glendale, California, just east of the Los Angeles city limits, causing the deaths of 11 people and injuring 177 more. The driver of the car, who was allegedly trying to commit suicide and had changed his mind shortly before the impact but was unable to move his car from the wet tracks, survived the incident and was charged with eleven counts of murder and one count of arson.

== Background ==
In the early morning rush hour period, southbound Ventura County Line train #100 (approaching Los Angeles) normally carried between 200 and 250 passengers; the northbound Antelope Valley Line train #901 (leaving Los Angeles) normally carried between thirty and fifty passengers.

The freight train involved in the crash was "tied down" (parked and unattended) on an auxiliary track known as "The Slide", running parallel along the west side of the main tracks, led by Union Pacific model EMD SD70M locomotive number 4323, and CEFX model SD40-2 number 3173, waiting to deliver track ballast to repair tracks on the former Southern Pacific Railroad's Coast Line which had previously been washed out in January 2005 by major rainstorms.

== Crash ==
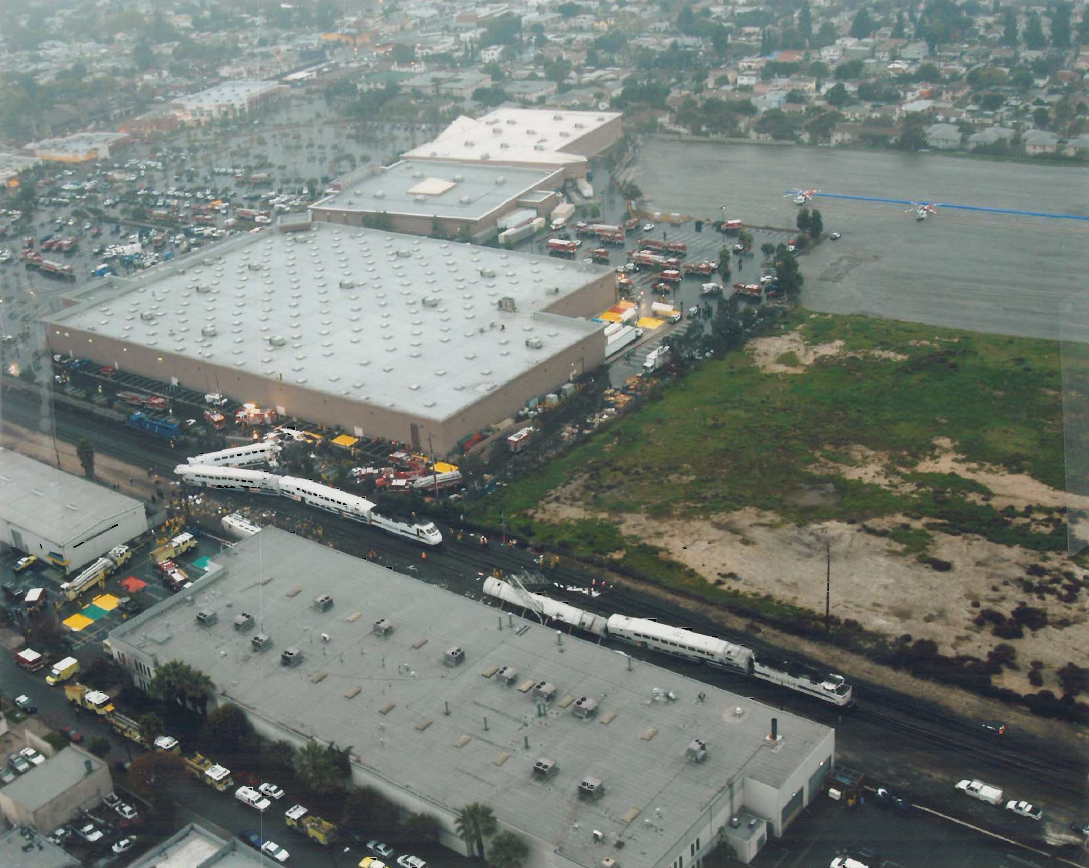
Overhead image of the 2005 Glendale train crash, Metrolink train #100 is on the left and Metrolink #901 is on the right.

On January 26, 2005, at 6:03 a.m. PST, Metrolink's southbound Ventura County Line train #100 collided with a sport utility vehicle that had been abandoned on the tracks immediately south of the Chevy Chase Drive grade crossing and near a Costco retail store on the Glendale–Los Angeles boundary (the western edge of the railroad right of way is the dividing line), in an industrial area north of downtown Los Angeles. The train jackknifed and struck trains on either side of it—one a stationary Union Pacific freight train, and the other a northbound Metrolink Antelope Valley Line train (#901) traveling in the opposite direction. The chain-reaction collisions resulted in the deaths of eleven people.

Among the first responders to the crash were employees of the Costco store adjacent to the accident site, who placed calls to 9-1-1 and climbed the perimeter fence to aid the victims, pulling out survivors and using fire extinguishers until firefighters arrived. About 300 firefighters, helicopters and cadaver dogs were brought to the crash site in order to help locate individuals trapped.

Juan Manuel Álvarez, who had left his Jeep Cherokee Sport vehicle parked on the tracks, was arrested and charged with eleven counts of murder with "special circumstances". Authorities and Álvarez's legal defense claimed he was planning to commit suicide, but changed his mind at the last minute. Álvarez was convicted in June 2008 of the eleven counts plus one count of arson, and though prosecutors sought a death sentence, was instead sentenced in August 2008 to eleven consecutive life sentences in prison with no possibility of parole.

== Investigation ==
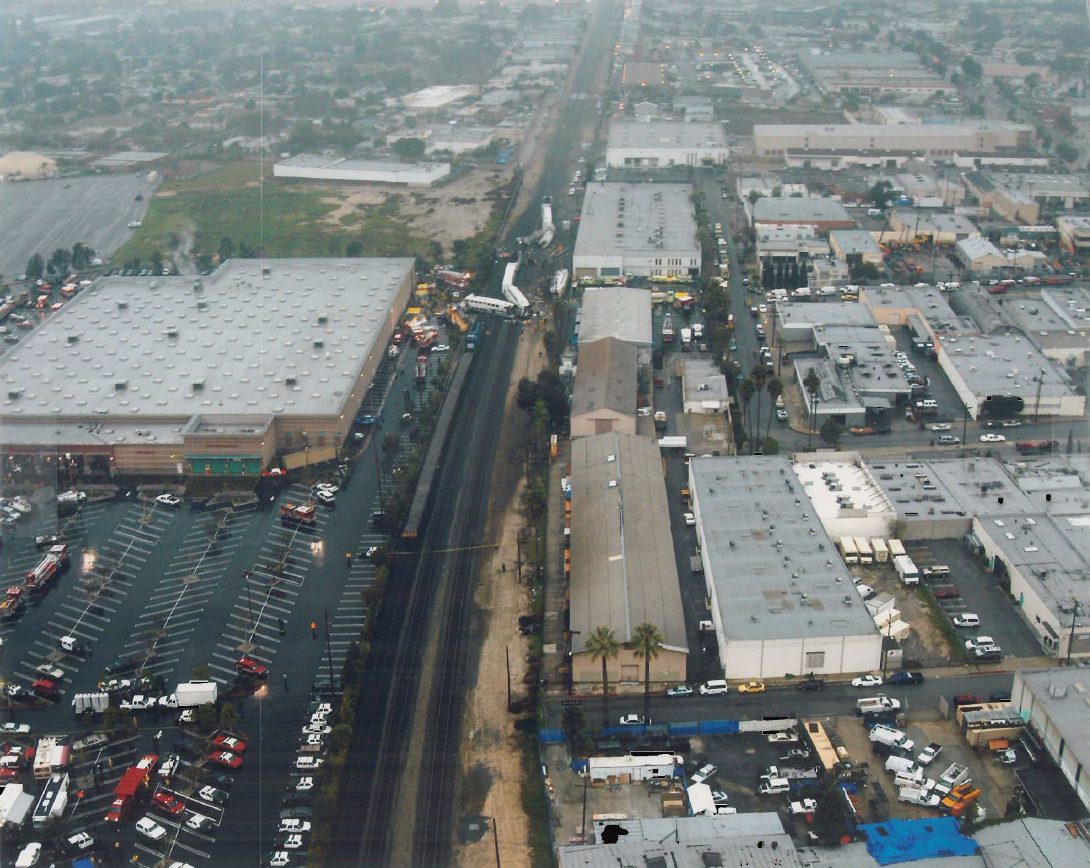
Overhead image of the 2005 Glendale train crash, Metrolink train #100 is on the closer to the camera and Metrolink #901 is in the distance.

A National Transportation Safety Board (NTSB) team investigated the crash, assisted by the Brotherhood of Locomotive Engineers and Trainmen's (BLET) Safety Task Force. The Glendale Police Department led the criminal investigation, assisted by the Union Pacific Police Department and the Los Angeles County Sheriff's Department, and the criminal case was tried in Los Angeles County Superior Court.

The southbound Metrolink train (#100) struck the parked Jeep that had been driven by Álvarez onto the tracks at the Chevy Chase Drive grade crossing just west of San Fernando Road, pushing the Jeep southward along the track towards the Los Feliz Boulevard undercrossing until automotive parts struck a track switch and became lodged under the leading car of the Metrolink train, raising it up and causing the train to derail. Cars from the derailed train jackknifed, hitting the locomotive of the stationary Union Pacific freight train and also sideswiping the rear of the passing northbound #901 Metrolink passenger train. This caused the rear cars of the northbound train to derail, and at least one car rolled over onto its side. A fire, involving one or more passenger cars, was caused by spilled diesel fuel.

The root cause of the crash was attributed to the driver of the automobile, Juan Manuel Álvarez of Compton, who deliberately drove onto, and left his vehicle on, the tracks while allegedly attempting to commit suicide. Having slashed his wrists and stabbed himself repeatedly in the chest, he parked his car on the tracks to finish the attempt. However, Álvarez changed his mind and attempted to leave the tracks. Because he was unable to dislodge his vehicle from the rain-soaked gravel and slick rails, he abandoned the vehicle moments before the crowded southbound train approached. Both this causation and the end result have many similarities to that of the Ufton Nervet rail crash in the United Kingdom, which occurred three months previously and involved a suicidal driver parking their car on a level crossing to be struck by an inbound train, although in that case the driver of the car stayed in the vehicle and was killed along with six others.

Early rumors of the incident being a terrorist attack were dismissed, as no connections to any terrorist organization existed with the suspect.

== Reaction ==
The wreck caused intense attention to the train configuration. Many commuter trains are pushed from the back by the locomotive in a push-pull configuration, including Metrolink trains returning to Union Station. In this configuration, the first car is a cab car. The push-pull configuration eliminates the need for elaborate turnaround maneuvers and facilities to reverse a train's direction. There was criticism that the configuration made the accident worse: claims that if the heavier engine were ahead of the passenger cars, then casualties would have been reduced and might have prevented derailment.

== Aftermath ==
Regular Metrolink passenger service was restored through the crash site the following Monday, January 31. Immediately afterward, Metrolink temporarily roped off the first cars in all of their trains; passengers were seated starting in the second car. Metrolink gradually modified this policy. In 2007, the line permitted passengers to sit in a portion of the first car when in "rear-pushed mode". Seating is still not permitted in the roped-off, forward-most section of the first cars (just behind the engineer's cab) until the introduction of new rear cab cars.

The day following the incident, police intervened in a similar "copycat" incident in Irvine, California, where a suicidal man parked his car on Metrolink tracks. The man drove away from the tracks when police arrived and was later arrested.

Survivor John Phipps was made famous due to a Los Angeles Daily News photograph of his farewell to his family and high school sweetheart, which was written in his blood on the interior of a passenger car.

The Chevy Chase Drive Crossing was undamaged, and remained fully unchanged after the crash. The crossing was upgraded in 2013 with quad gate barriers and 4 bells.

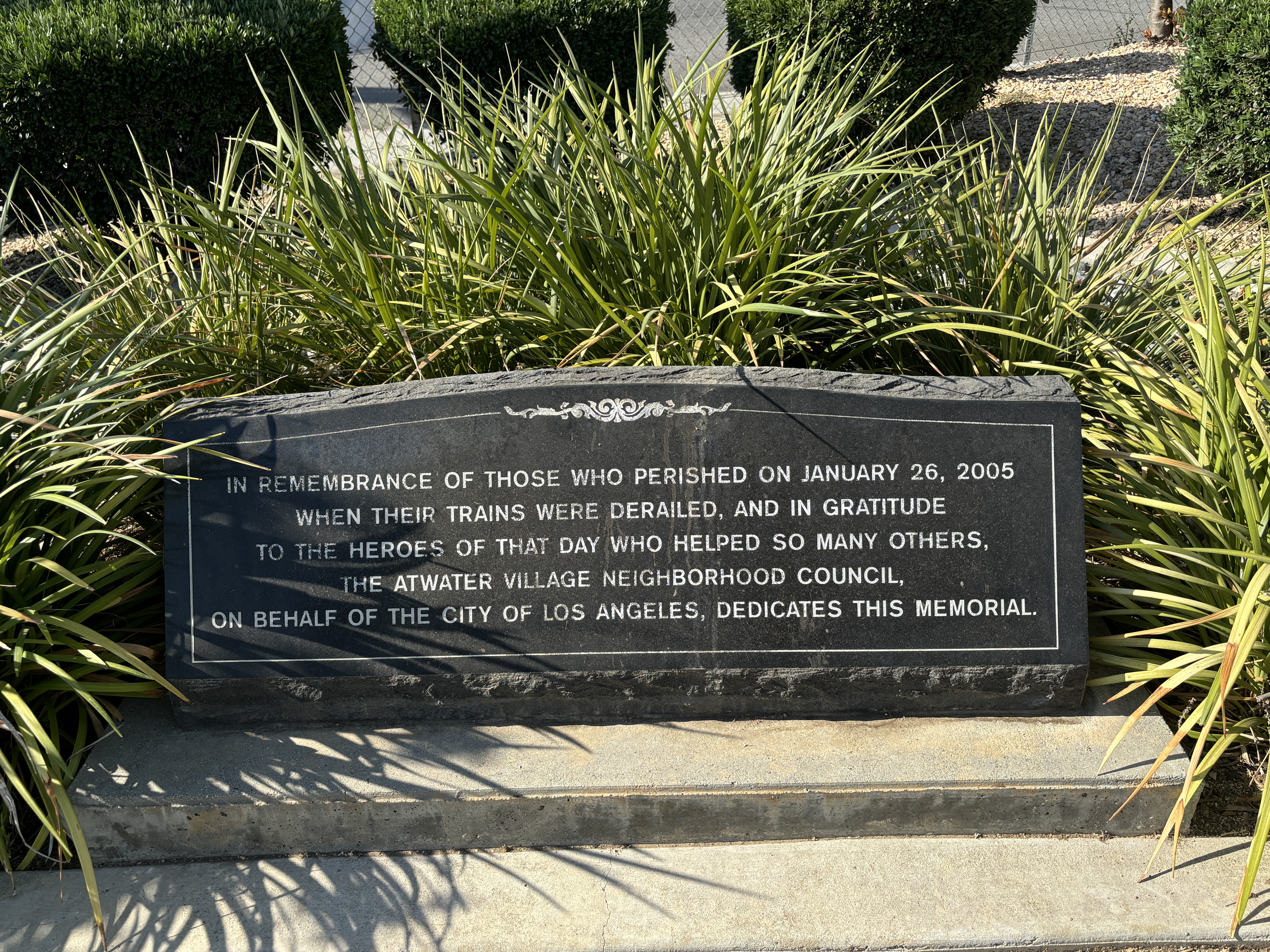
Memorial at Atwater Village, Los Angeles

A ceremony commemorating the event was held on the first anniversary, in which attendees honored the victims and recognized the heroes who helped save lives.

Attorneys Brian Spanish and Jerome Ringler filed a negligence lawsuit against Metrolink on behalf of a dozen victims in January 2009, claiming that the engineer saw the Jeep 3/4 mile (1,200 m) away but did not apply the emergency brakes until 800 feet (240 m) away. In an October 14, 2009, article appearing in the Los Angeles Times, Metrolink announced it had reached an agreement to settle most of the remaining claims. By the following month, Metrolink paid $30 million in lawsuit settlements, with several large payments of multiple million dollars for four cases. Other litigation against Metrolink was still ongoing, raising the settlement to a tentative $39 million in December 2009, which closes the majority of the 186 complaints against the agency, eleven wrongful death lawsuits, and sixteen serious injury lawsuits.

The Southern California Regional Rail Authority (SCRRA), the governing body of Metrolink, has invested over $500 million to buttress safety features along 512 miles (824 km) of track from Ventura to San Bernardino and the northern San Diego counties. Upgrades included are "sealed" grade crossings, safer rail cars and locomotives, automatic train stops and the nation's first onboard rail video cameras and the SCRRA is included in the nation's first positive train control system.

== Casualties ==
Eleven people were killed in the collision, while between 100 and 200 people were injured.

- Manuel Alcala, 51
- Julia Bennett, 44
- Alfonso Caballero, 62
- Elizabeth Hill, 62
- Henry Kilinski, 39
- Scott McKeown, 42
- Thomas Ormiston, 58, the conductor of train #901
- William Parent, 53
- Leonard Romero, 53
- James Tutino, 47
- Don Wiley, 58

== Suspect ==
Juan Manuel Álvarez was allegedly suicidal long before the incident occurred. According to some reports, he had attempted suicide previously. In addition, he was a known methamphetamine addict prone to delusional behavior. At the time of the crash, Álvarez, the father of two young children, was experiencing marital difficulties; his wife, Carmelita Ochoa, had filed a restraining order against him months before the incident, claiming he had become erratic, threatening and controlling to her and their children. He reportedly was employed as a handyman in the Los Angeles suburb of Compton.

Police initially believed that Álvarez decided to kill himself on the day of the collision, but that he changed his mind immediately before the train hit his vehicle, jumping out of the car and observing as the crash took place. He fled the scene but was later found at a friend's home in Atwater Village. He was charged with, and subsequently convicted of, eleven counts of murder with "special circumstances". Police say following investigations indicated Álvarez may have intended to cause the crash without committing suicide. Authorities filed additional charges against him for murder with intent.

=== Legal proceedings ===
Prosecutors sought the death penalty against Álvarez under a seldom-used state law under which train wrecking resulting in a person's death is a capital offense.The law dates from 1873, and was used to prosecute Old West train robbers who were known to blow up tracks to rob trains.

During the trial, the defense maintained their claim that the crash was the result of Álvarez's aborted suicide attempt and he never intended to hurt anyone, but prosecutors claimed he deliberately caused the crash in an attempt to get attention from his estranged wife, citing that he doused his SUV with gasoline beforehand. A relative of one of the victims questioned why Álvarez did not simply lie down on the tracks if it was really a suicide attempt.

On June 26, 2008, Álvarez was found guilty of eleven counts of first-degree murder with special circumstances and one count of arson related to the incident. He was acquitted of the train-wrecking charge. On July 15, the jury recommended life imprisonment without the possibility of parole. On August 20, Álvarez was formally sentenced to eleven consecutive life sentences without the possibility of parole.

== See also ==
- 2008 Chatsworth train collision – A Metrolink train crash also on the Ventura County Line.
- Selby rail crash – A train crash in the UK in February 2001 under similar circumstances: a pushed train, an automobile on the track, and another train on an adjacent track.
- Ufton Nervet rail crash – A train crash in the UK in November 2004 under similar circumstances: a suicidal person causing a derailment
- Valhalla train crash – A train crash in New York in February 2015 with vehicle on train tracks with driver's behavior disputed.
- 2015 Oxnard train derailment – A Metrolink crash in Los Angeles in February 2015 involving vehicle on train tracks.
- List of homicides in California
