= EMD F59PH =

North American diesel locomotive class

EMD F59PH and F59PHI
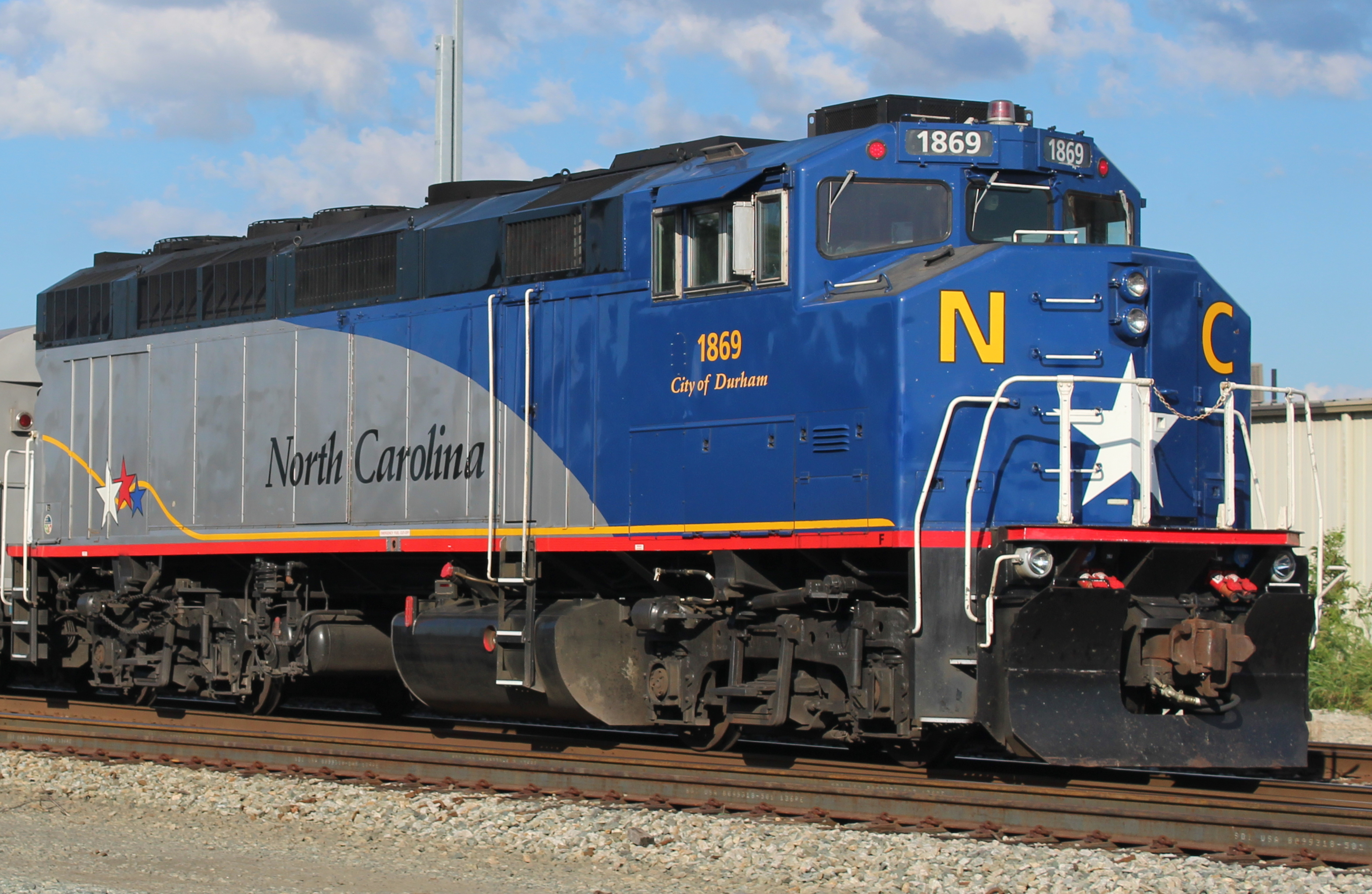
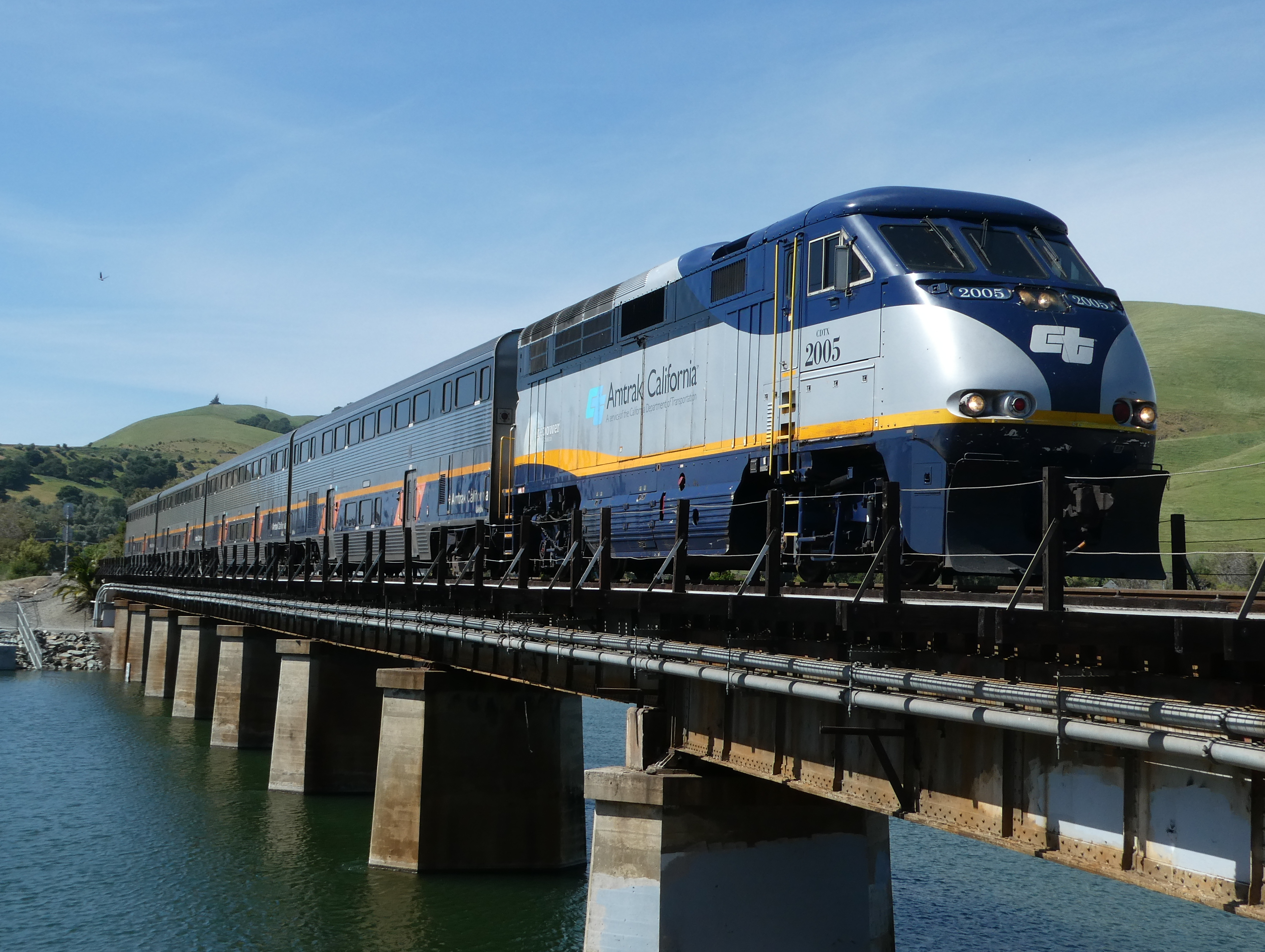
- Top: F59PH operated by Amtrak on the Piedmont; Bottom: F59PHI operated by Amtrak on the Capitol Corridor
Type and origin
- Power type: Diesel-electric
- Builder: Electro-Motive Division (EMD)
- Build date: F59PH: 1988–1994; F59PHI: 1994–2001
- Total produced: F59PH: 72; F59PHI: 83
Specifications
- Configuration
  - AAR: B-B
  - UIC: Bo'Bo'
- Gauge: 4 ft 8 1/2 in (1,435 mm) standard gauge
- Length: F59PH: 58 ft 2 in (17.73 m); F59PHI: 58 ft 7 in (17.86 m)
- Prime mover: F59PH: EMD 12-710G3A; F59PHI: EMD 12-710G3C-EC
- Cylinders: 12
Performance figures
- Maximum speed: F59PHI: 110 mph (177 km/h)
- Power output: F59PH: 3,000 hp (2.24 MW); F59PHI: 3,200 hp (2.4 MW)
Career
- Locale: Canada, United States

The EMD F59PH is a four-axle 3,000 hp (2 MW) B-B diesel-electric locomotive built by General Motors Electro-Motive Division from 1988 to 1994. A variant, the F59PHI, was produced from 1994 to 2001. The F59PH was originally built for GO Transit commuter operation in the Toronto region. Metrolink in Southern California also purchased a fleet for its 1992 launch. The streamlined F59PHI was designed for Amtrak California intercity service. A total of 72 F59PH and 83 F59PHI locomotives were built.

== Design ==
Based on the GP59, the locomotives had a turbocharged EMD 12-710G3A, a 12-cylinder, two-stroke diesel engine (prime mover). Head end power was supplied by a separate diesel generator.

The F59PHI is a variant with a fully enclosed streamlined carbody. Like the F59PH, the F59PHI is equipped with a secondary electrical generator – rated between 500 and 750 kW (670 and 1,010 hp) – for HEP.

== History ==
Between May 1988 and May 1994, 72 F59PH locomotives were built for two commuter transit railroads: GO Transit of Toronto and Metrolink of Los Angeles.

GO Transit began retiring its F59PH locomotives in 2008 in favor of newer MPI MPXpress locomotives. Most were purchased by other operators including Exo (10 locomotives), Metra (3), NCDOT (11) for use on the Piedmont, and Trinity Railway Express (7). Five of the NCDOT units were rebuilt into cab control units without prime movers.

Seven Metrolink units were rebuilt as F59PHR. The non-rebuilt Metrolink locomotives were retired by 2020. Five of those were purchased by NCDOT in 2018. Metrolink donated F59PHR No. 851 to the Fullerton Train Museum in January 2026.

The first nine F59PHI units were purchased by Caltrans for use on Amtrak California services and entered service in 1994. A total of 83 locomotives were built, most for commuter rail and Amtrak corridor services on the West Coast. Two F59PHI locomotives were built in 1995 for Philip Morris Companies to haul the Marlboro Unlimited, a custom built luxury train to carry winners of a Philip Morris sweepstakes around the country. After Philip Morris cancelled the train, the units were stored before being sold to Metrolink in 1998. Some units are still in service with the original owners, while others have been retired. The 21 ex-Amtrak units were sold to Metra in 2018.

== Original owners ==
A total of 72 F59PH and 83 F59PHI locomotives were delivered. Most were built at the General Motors Diesel facility in London, Ontario. Super Steel in Schenectady, New York, handled assembly of some units.

Railroad	Model	Quantity	Road numbers
AMT	F59PHI	11	1320–1330
Amtrak	F59PHI	21	450–470
BC Transit	F59PHI	5	901–905
Caltrans	F59PHI	15	2001–2015
GO Transit	F59PH	49	520–568
Metrolink	F59PH	23	851–873
Metrolink	F59PHI	12	874–881; 884–887
NCDOT	F59PHI	2	1755; 1797
North County Transit District	F59PHI	2	3001–3002
Philip Morris	F59PHI	2	0001–0002
Sound Transit	F59PHI	11	901–911
Trinity Railway Express	F59PHI	2	569–570
Total		155	
