= Chatsworth =

Chatsworth may refer to the following, all named for Chatsworth House in England:

== Places ==
=== Australia ===
- Chatsworth, Queensland a semi-rural locality in the Gympie Region
- Electoral district of Chatsworth, Queensland, Australia

=== Canada ===
- Chatsworth, Ontario, a township municipality
- Chatsworth, Ontario (village), located within above township

=== Ireland ===
- Aughatubbrid, a townland in County Kilkenny, also known as Chatsworth

=== Singapore ===
- Chatsworth International School, Singapore
- Chatsworth Mediart Academy, Singapore

=== South Africa ===
- Chatsworth, KwaZulu-Natal
- Chatsworth, Western Cape

=== United Kingdom ===
- Chatsworth, Derbyshire
  - Chatsworth House (Duke of Devonshire), at Chatsworth, Derbyshire

=== United States ===
- Chatsworth, Los Angeles, California, a district in the San Fernando Valley
  - Chatsworth Peak, a peak in the Simi Hills overlooking Chatsworth, Los Angeles
  - Chatsworth station, a passenger train station in Chatsworth, Los Angeles
  - Chatsworth Hills Academy, Chatsworth, Los Angeles
- Chatsworth, Georgia
- Chatsworth, Illinois
- Chatsworth, Iowa
- Chatsworth, New Jersey

=== Zimbabwe ===
- Chatsworth, Zimbabwe

== Other ==
- Chatsworth Television, a British television production company
- 1887 Great Chatsworth train wreck, bridge collapse on the Toledo, Peoria & Western railroad in Illinois
- 2008 Chatsworth train collision, a collision between a Metrolink commuter train and a Union Pacific freight train in the Chatsworth district of Los Angeles on September 12, 2008
- Chatsworth (TV series), a British documentary television series
- Chatsworth Estate, the name of a fictional council estate in the city of Manchester in the British TV series Shameless
- Chatsworth, a character from British TV series Chuggington.

== See also ==
- Chadsworth Cottage
- Cotsworth (disambiguation)
- Coatsworth
