= Auxiliary brake =

Auxiliary brake may refer to:

- Parking brake
- Emergency brake (train)
