= 2008 Chatsworth train collision =

Collision in Los Angeles, California, U.S.

Coordinates: 34°16′19″N 118°36′5″W

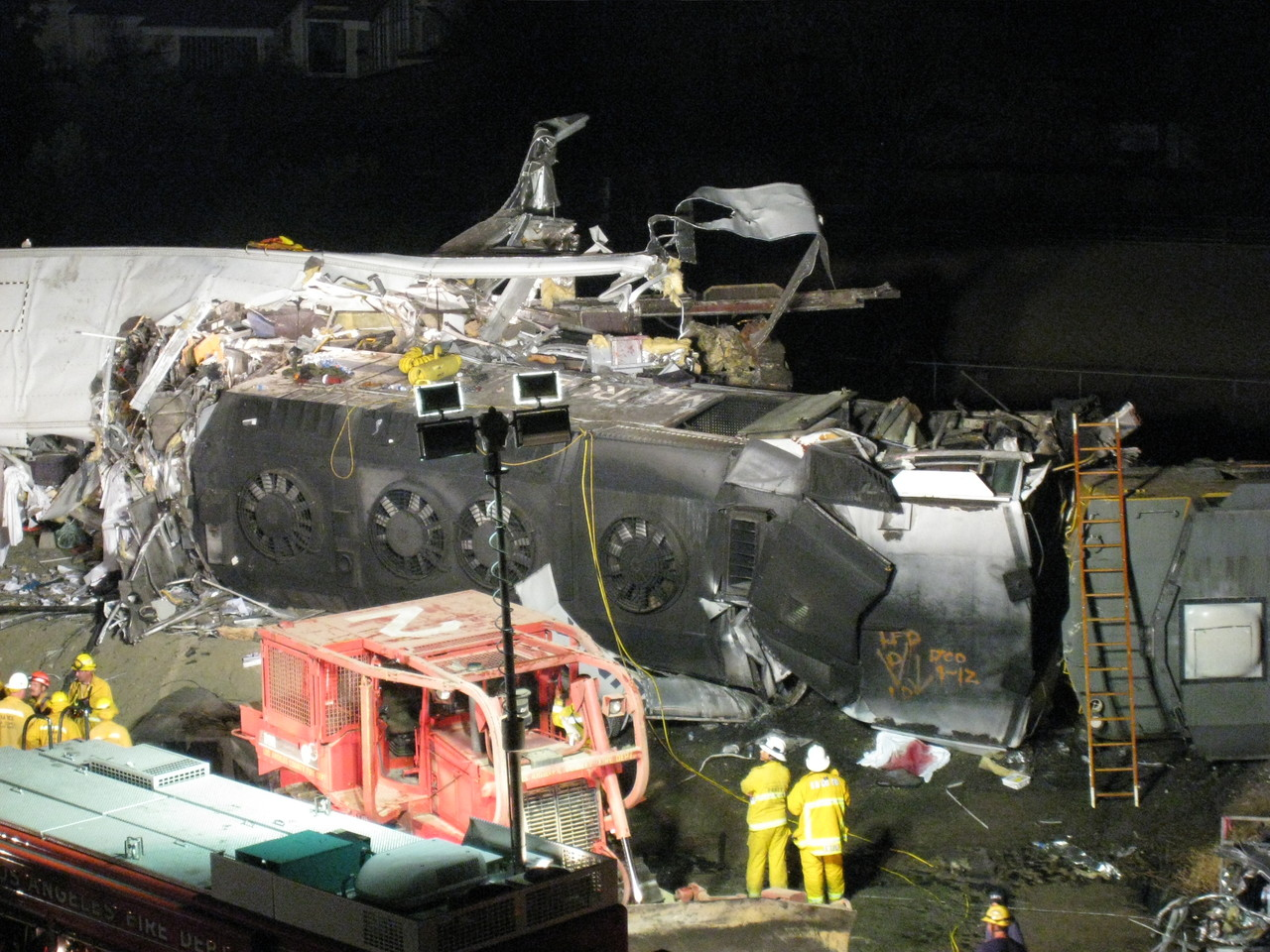
- Rescue workers in front of the Metrolink locomotive lying on its side after penetrating the lead passenger car (left)

Details
- Date: September 12, 2008; 18 years ago 4:22:23 p.m. PDT (23:22:23 UTC)
- Location: Los Angeles, California
- Country: United States
- Line: Ventura County Line
- Operator: Metrolink; Union Pacific Railroad
- Incident type: Collision
- Cause: Stop-signal overrun (SSO) due to distraction from mobile phone use

Statistics
- Trains: Metrolink passenger train Union Pacific freight train
- Deaths: 25
- Injured: 135
- Damage: More than US$7,100,500
Route map

The 2008 Chatsworth train collision occurred at 4:22:23 p.m. PDT (23:22:23 UTC) on September 12, 2008, when a Union Pacific Railroad freight train and a Metrolink commuter rail passenger train collided head-on in the Chatsworth neighborhood of Los Angeles, California, United States.

The scene of the collision was a curved section of single track on the Metrolink Ventura County Line just east of Stoney Point. According to the National Transportation Safety Board (NTSB), which investigated the cause of the collision, the Metrolink train ran through a red signal before entering a section of single track where the opposing freight train had been given the right of way by the train dispatcher. The NTSB blamed the Metrolink train's engineer, 46-year-old Robert M. Sanchez, for the collision, concluding that he was distracted by text messages he was sending while on duty. Sanchez was among the 25 killed in the accident.

This mass casualty event brought a massive emergency response by both the city and county of Los Angeles, but the nature and extent of physical trauma taxed the available resources. First responding officer Tom Gustafson described the wreck as "beyond human description". Response included California Emergency Mobile Patrol Search and Rescue (CEMP) as a first responding unit requested by Los Angeles Police Department (LAPD). With 25 deaths, this was the deadliest collision in Metrolink's history. Many survivors remained hospitalized for an extended period.

Lawyers quickly began filing claims against Metrolink. The collision launched and reinvigorated public debate on a range of topics including public relations, emergency management, and safety, which has driven various regulatory and legislative actions, including the Rail Safety Improvement Act of 2008.

== Collision ==
Metrolink commuter train #111, consisting of a 250,000-pound (110 t) EMD F59PH locomotive (SCAX 855) pulling three Bombardier BiLevel Coaches, departed Union Station in downtown Los Angeles at 3:35 p.m. PDT (22:35 UTC) heading westbound to Moorpark in suburban Ventura County. Approximately forty minutes later, it departed the Chatsworth station with 222 people aboard, and had traveled approximately 1.25 miles (2 km) when it collided head-on with an eastbound Union Pacific local freight train. The freight train was led by two EMD SD70ACe locomotives, #8485 and #8491, and was pulling 17 freight cars. The Metrolink locomotive telescoped rearward into the passenger compartment of the first passenger car and caught fire. All three locomotives, the leading Metrolink passenger car, and ten freight cars were derailed, and both lead locomotives and the passenger car fell over.

The collision occurred after the Metrolink passenger train engineer, 46-year-old Robert M. Sanchez, failed to obey a red stop signal that indicated it was not safe to proceed into the single track section. The train dispatcher's computer at a remote control center in Pomona did not display a warning before the collision according to the NTSB. Metrolink initially reported that the dispatcher tried in vain to contact the train crew to warn them; but the NTSB contradicted this report, saying the dispatcher noticed a problem only after the collision and was notified by the passenger train's conductor first.

Both trains were moving toward each other at the time of the collision. At least one passenger on the Metrolink train reported seeing the freight train moments before impact, coming around the curve. The conductor of the passenger train, who was in the rear car and was injured in the collision, estimated that his train was traveling at 40 miles per hour (64 km/h) before it suddenly came to a dead stop after the collision. The NTSB reported that the passenger train was traveling at 42 miles per hour (68 km/h). The freight train was traveling at about the same speed after its engineer triggered the emergency air brake only two seconds before impact, while the Metrolink engineer never applied the brakes on his train.

=== Location ===
The collision occurred after the freight train emerged from the 500-foot-long (150 m) tunnel #28, just south of California State Route 118 near the intersection of Heather Lee Lane and Andora Avenue near Chatsworth Hills Academy. The collision was in Chatsworth, a neighborhood of Los Angeles located at the northwestern edge of the San Fernando Valley. The trains collided on the Metrolink Ventura County Line, part of the Montalvo Cutoff, opened by the Southern Pacific Company on March 20, 1904, to improve the alignment of its Coast Line. Metrolink has operated the line since purchasing it in the 1990s from Southern Pacific (now owned by Union Pacific), which retained trackage rights for freight service.

=== Railroad physical characteristics ===
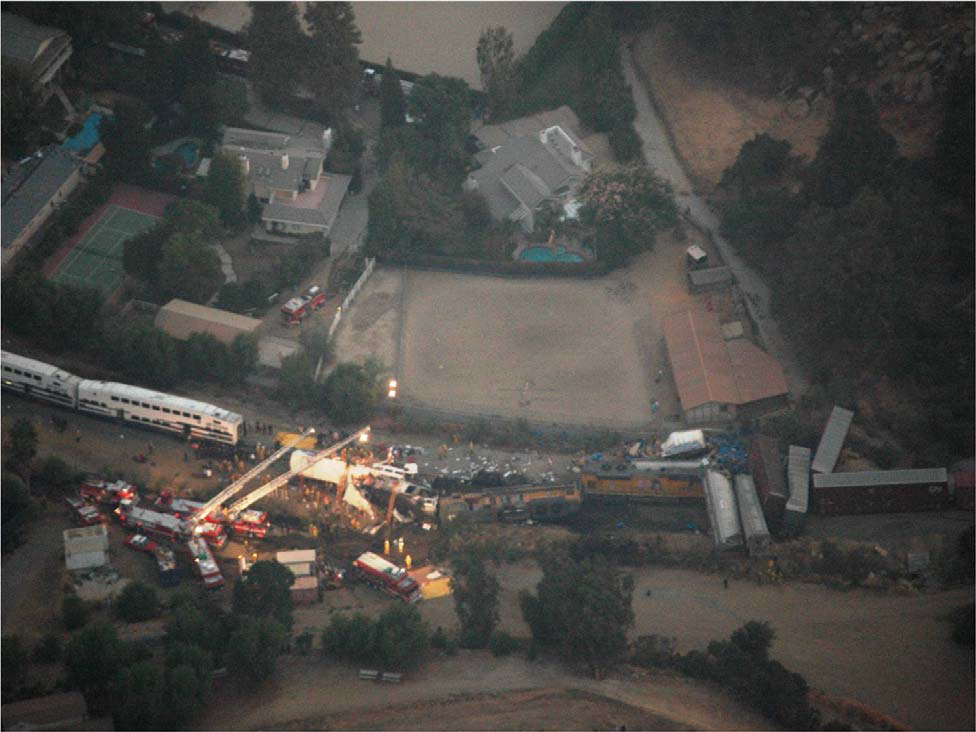
Close aerial view of the collision site. The collision occurred on the section of a single track.

Both trains were on the same section of single track that runs between the Chatsworth station (which is double tracked) through the Santa Susana Pass. The line returns to double track again as it enters the Simi Valley. Three tunnels under the pass are only wide enough to support a single track, and it would be very costly to widen them. This single-track section carries 24 passenger trains and 12 freight trains each day.

The line's railway signaling system is designed to ensure that trains wait on the double-track section while a train is proceeding in the other direction on the single track. The signal system was upgraded in the 1990s to support Metrolink commuter rail services, and Richard Stanger, the executive director of Metrolink in its early years of 1991 to 1998, said the system had functioned without trouble in the past. The Metrolink train would normally wait in the Chatsworth station for the daily Union Pacific freight train to pass before proceeding, unless the freight train was already waiting for it at Chatsworth. The location was not protected by a derail system to force a safe derailment of any train running past a red signal into the single-track section.

== Timeline ==
Metrolink train #111's timetable
Station	Time
L.A. Union Station	3:35 p.m.
Glendale	3:45 p.m.
Downtown Burbank	3:51 p.m.
Burbank Airport–South	3:55 p.m.
Van Nuys	4:02 p.m.
Northridge	4:09 p.m.
Chatsworth	4:16 p.m.
Simi Valley	4:28 p.m.
Moorpark	4:45 p.m.

The events on September 12, 2008, leading up to the collision (all times local):

5:54 a.m.	Engineer Sanchez begins his 11-hour split shift.
6:44 a.m.	Sanchez begins his morning run.
8:53 a.m.	Sanchez finishes his morning run after exchanging 45 text messages while en route.
9:26 a.m.	Sanchez finishes the first part of his shift and goes off duty.
2:00 p.m.	Sanchez returns to work after reportedly taking a two-hour nap.
3:03 p.m.	Sanchez begins his afternoon run.
3:30 p.m.	Sanchez uses his cell phone to order a roast beef sandwich from a restaurant in Moorpark.
3:35 p.m.	Metrolink train #111 departs Union Station with Sanchez at the controls of locomotive #855.
4:13 p.m.	The signal north of the Chatsworth station is set to red to hold the Metrolink train.
4:16 p.m.	Train #111 is scheduled to depart Chatsworth station with the next stop in Simi Valley. After departing, Sanchez runs through a track switch, but does not apply brakes.
4:21:03 p.m.	Sanchez receives a seventh text message while en route.
4:22:01 p.m.	Sanchez sends the last of five text messages while en route, 22 seconds before impact.
4:22:19 p.m.	The locomotive crews can first see each other, 4 seconds before impact.
4:22:21 p.m.	The Union Pacific freight engineer triggers the emergency brake, 2 seconds before impact.
4:22:23 p.m.	The trains collide.

== Aftermath ==
=== Emergency response ===
The Los Angeles Fire Department (LAFD) initially dispatched a "physical rescue" assignment at a residential address near the scene in response to a 9-1-1 emergency call from the home. The crew arrived at the address four minutes later, just before 4:30 p.m. PDT and accessed the scene by cutting through the backyard fence. Upon arrival, the captain on the scene immediately called for an additional five ambulances, then 30 fire engines, and after reaching the wreck he called for every heavy search and rescue unit in the city. Hundreds of emergency workers were eventually involved in the rescue and recovery efforts, including 250 firefighters. Two Los Angeles city firefighters received medals for risking their lives to enter a confined space with smoky and potentially toxic air, without their air bottles, to rescue one of the freight train crew members. LAPD Devonshire Division patrol officers arrived on scene shortly after the first LAFD Engine Company. As firefighters were putting out the flames of the burning diesel fuel that had spilled out of the freight engine, patrol officers entered the damaged, smoke-filled train cars to rescue/administer first aid to several passengers who were stranded on the upper decks due to their critical injuries. Two police officers received medals, and two others received commendations and were credited with potentially saving the lives of several injured passengers.

The event was operationally identified as the "Chatsworth Incident" and was reclassified as a "mass casualty incident". All six of LAFD's air ambulances were mobilized, along with six additional helicopters from the Los Angeles County Fire Department and the Los Angeles County Sheriff's Department. The helicopters were requested under a mutual aid arrangement. A review of the emergency response and the on-site and hospital care was initiated by Los Angeles County Supervisor Don Knabe immediately after the event, and was expected to take 90 days to complete.

=== Casualties ===
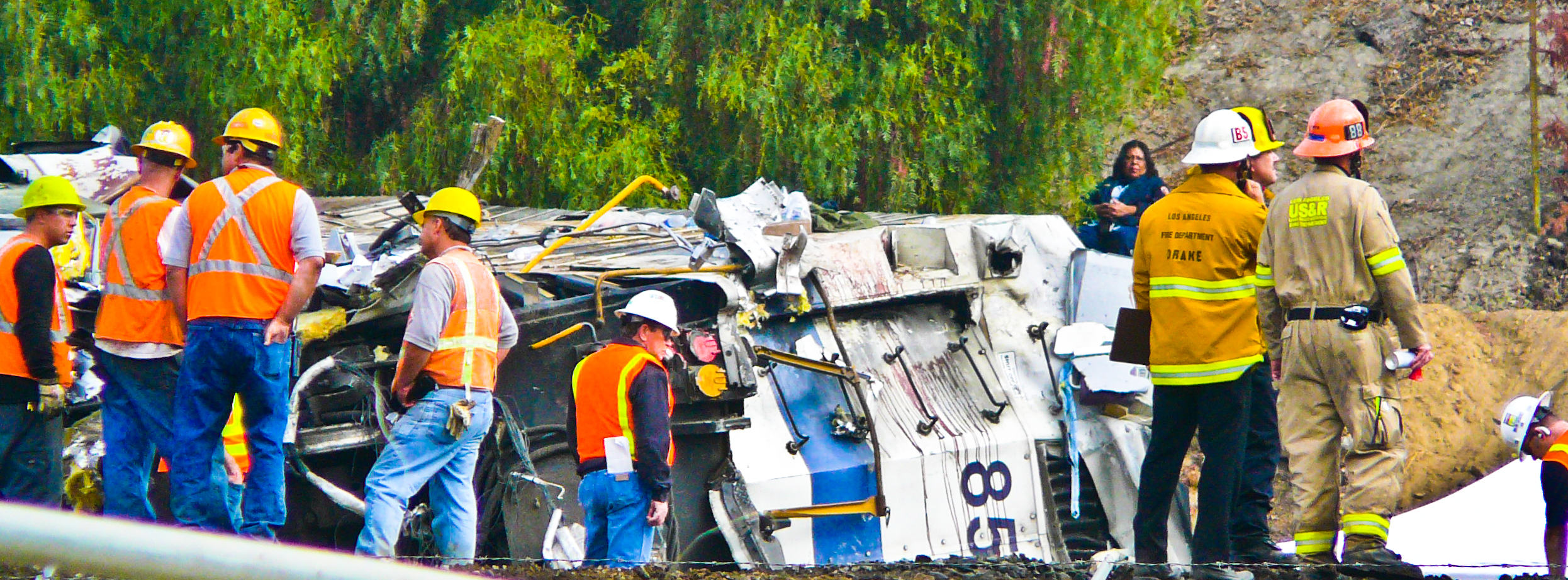
Recovery workers stand near the rear of the Metrolink locomotive after it was removed from the lead passenger car, where most of the serious injuries and deaths occurred.

A total of 25 people died in the collision, including engineer Sanchez and two victims who died at hospitals in the days following the crash. This event is the deadliest railway collision in Metrolink's history, and the worst in the United States since the Big Bayou Canot train disaster in 1993.

A total of 135 others were reported injured, 46 of them critically, with 85 of the injured transported to 13 hospitals and two transported themselves. Air ambulance helicopters medevaced 40 patients. LAFD Captain Steve Ruda reported that the high number of critically injured passengers taxed the area's emergency response capabilities, and patients were distributed to all 12 trauma centers in Los Angeles County. Providence Holy Cross Medical Center in Mission Hills treated 17 patients, more than any other hospital.

Captain Ruda said his firefighters had never seen such carnage. Austin Walbridge, a train passenger, told a TV news reporter that the interior of the train was "bloody, a mess. Just a disaster. It was horrible." Emergency responders described the victims as having crush-type injuries. Dr. Amal K. Obaid, a trauma surgeon who practices at USC University Hospital where several victims were treated, described their injuries in more detail, "They have head injuries, multiple facial fractures, chest trauma, collapsed lungs, rib fractures, pelvic fractures, leg and arm fractures, cuts in the skin and soft tissue. Some have blood in the brain."

The Los Angeles County Coroner set up an air-conditioned tent that functioned as a temporary morgue at the site. One off-duty Los Angeles Police Department officer was among the confirmed deaths, as was the Metrolink train's engineer, an employee of Veolia Transport, a contracted operator of Metrolink. One of the passengers who died was a survivor of the 2005 Glendale train crash. Another had been commuting by train since Metrolink's inception in 1992. Many victims were residents of suburban Simi Valley and Moorpark on their way home from work in the Los Angeles area.

The four other crew members of the two trains survived. The conductor and engineer of the freight train were trapped inside the lead locomotive while it was engulfed in flames; the firefighters who rescued the pair found them banging on the thick glass windshield, unable to escape. The freight crew also had a brakeman riding in the second locomotive who was injured in the crash.

The search for victims came to an end shortly after 14:30 PDT on September 13, approximately 22 hours after the collision.

=== Service disruptions ===
The crash disrupted service on the Pacific Surfliner and the Coast Starlight. Amtrak canceled service on the Pacific Surfliner between San Luis Obispo and Union Station in Los Angeles and Amtrak Thruway buses transported Coast Starlight passengers from Union Station to Santa Barbara to board the trains. Metrolink service on the Ventura County Line was interrupted north of Chatsworth, and all service resumed four days after the crash.

=== Investigation ===
==== Preliminary investigation controversy ====
Metrolink spokeswoman Denise Tyrrell disclosed the day after the crash that a preliminary investigation of dispatch records and computers showed the engineer of the Metrolink passenger train failed to stop his train for a red railway signal, which indicated his train did not have authority to proceed on the main track. She was quoted as saying, "We don't know how the error happened, but this is what we believe happened. We believe it was our engineer who failed to stop at the signal." Tyrrell said that if the engineer had obeyed the signal, the crash would not have occurred. However Los Angeles County Supervisor and Metrolink board member Don Knabe said it was premature to blame the engineer, speculating that "there could always be a technical malfunction where ... there was a green light both ways."

After a Metrolink board meeting two days after her remarks, Tyrrell resigned. Tyrrell stated that she quit because a Metrolink Board statement called her announcement premature and inappropriate; she maintained that it was proper to get out in front of the story before the NTSB took over the investigation. She stated that she asked for and received authorization to make the comments from David Solow, Metrolink's chief executive. Solow confirmed that he did give authorization, but said that, in hindsight, he should not have given permission. After her resignation, some good government proponents praised Tyrrell for her candor, including the chief public advocate with California Common Cause. The Los Angeles Times also published an editorial by columnist Patt Morrison sympathetic to Tyrrell's position, in which she says, "I am unclear of the concept of how the truth can somehow be premature. The truth is the truth."

==== Official investigation ====
The NTSB led the official investigation to determine the probable cause, but NTSB officials had not commented on the crash prior to the Metrolink statement. In a subsequent press conference at the scene two hours after Tyrrell's comments, an NTSB official cautioned that the cause of the collision was still under investigation. The NTSB studied the data from the train event recorders, which had been recovered by NTSB investigators working at the scene. The Metrolink train had two data recorders, one badly damaged, and the freight train had a data and a video recorder. The NTSB said it would collect other evidence and interview witnesses to try to officially report within a year's time why the crash occurred.

Tests of the railway signal system after the collision showed it was working properly, and should have shown proper signal indications to the Metrolink train, with two yellow signals as the train approached the Chatsworth station, and a red signal at the switch north of the station. "We can say with confidence that the signal system was working," the lead NTSB board member stated at a news conference after the tests. This focused the NTSB investigation on human factors.

Before releasing the collision scene and allowing restoration of service, the NTSB also conducted a final sight distance test. An identical Metrolink train and pair of Union Pacific locomotives were brought together at the point of impact and slowly backed away from each other. The test showed that the trains' engineers could not see each other until less than five seconds before the collision.

The surviving crew members could not be interviewed by the NTSB immediately after the collision because they were still recovering from their injuries. The NTSB was able to interview the Metrolink conductor about recorded radio communications, which did not capture the required communication between the conductor and engineer on the aspects displayed by the last two signals the train passed before the collision. He confirmed they did not call out the last two signals.

The NTSB also stated that a railroad switch showed evidence of damage consistent with the Metrolink passenger train "running through" the trailing switch points while they were set to allow the freight train to proceed onto the adjacent track, forcing them out of the way. "The switch bars were bent like a banana. It should be perfectly straight," according to the NTSB official. The NTSB member in charge of the investigative team said they were also concerned with possible fatigue issues related to the engineer's split shift. The engineer worked an 11.5-hour shift split with a 3.5-hour break, leaving only nine hours away from work between workdays.

The Federal Railroad Administration (FRA) also conducted an investigation into possible violations of federal railroad safety regulations. Its report identified violations involving required crew communications, handling of post-accident toxicology specimens, hazardous-materials shipping documentation, and operational testing and inspections. An audit of Metrolink contractor Connex's operational testing program identified 17 violations, for which the FRA recommended civil penalties. The agency also recommended civil penalties against Union Pacific for providing inaccurate hazardous-materials documentation to emergency responders.

The California Public Utilities Commission, the state agency responsible for regulating railroads, also reported that it had ten investigators with railroad experience working in conjunction with the NTSB, and would also be looking into the matter of the Tyrrell resignation.

==== Possible false green ====
Before the conclusion of the formal investigation, three witnesses came forward to say that they observed the signal to be green as the Metrolink train departed the Chatsworth station just before the collision. A newspaper reporter interviewed the witnesses at the station, and confirmed that the signal was visible from the station, and that the witnesses could correctly identify the colors displayed. A safety consultant said that although this type of signal failure is extremely rare, he had seen it twice before in his 13-year career as a locomotive engineer. The NTSB considered the eyewitnesses' accounts and, based on the results of its tests of the signal system and on the distance between the witnesses and the signal, rejected them as "contrary to the other evidence".

==== Text messaging ====
KCAL-TV news showed a text message allegedly sent by the Metrolink train's engineer 22 seconds before the crash.

Local television news broke the story that the Metrolink engineer was exchanging brief text messages with a 16-year-old railfan while operating the train, a violation of Metrolink rules according to the agency. The last message received from the engineer, time-stamped at 4:22:01, 22 seconds before the collision, reportedly said, "yea ... usually @ [sic] north camarillo," referencing Camarillo, a town farther down the line, where the engineer expected to meet another train.

The NTSB did not recover the engineer's cellphone in the wreckage and said the teenagers were cooperating with the investigation, initially noting that similar rumors about an engineer using a cell phone from an investigation recently conducted in Boston were unfounded. After receiving the engineer's cell phone records under subpoena, the NTSB confirmed that the engineer was texting while on duty, but had not yet correlated the messages with the collision timeline. After completing a preliminary timeline, the NTSB placed the last text message sent by the engineer at 22 seconds before impact.

An NTSB representative refused to comment further on the preliminary timeline, which investigators were still refining. Two University of Southern California academics used the information in the NTSB statement to determine that the last text message sent by the Metrolink train's engineer would have been sent a few seconds after he had passed the last red signal. This would make unconsciousness an unlikely cause for this error, since the engineer was able to compose and send the message; instead a psychology professor from the University of Utah raised the possibility that "inattentional blindness" caused the engineer to fail to see the signal.

The day after the NTSB confirmed the engineer was texting, and less than one week after the collision, the California Public Utilities Commission unanimously passed an emergency order to temporarily ban the use of cellular communication devices by train crew members, citing this collision and a previous San Francisco Municipal Railway collision where the train operator was using a cell phone. A week later, texting while driving an automobile was outlawed in California, effective January 1, 2009.

There was no federal regulation prohibiting cell phone use by train crews at the time of the collision, but the NTSB had recommended the Federal Railroad Administration address the issue in 2003, after concluding cell phone use by a freight train engineer contributed to a fatal head-on train collision in Texas in 2002. However, 19 days after the collision the FRA administrator issued Emergency Order No. 26 restricting the use of "personal electronic or electrical devices" by railroad operating employees.

On March 3, 2009, federal investigators released records showing that the train engineer Robert M. Sanchez had allowed a train enthusiast to ride in the cab several days before the crash, and that he was planning to let him run the train between four stations on the evening of the crash. "I'm gonna do all the radio talkin' ... ur gonna run the locomotive & I'm gonna tell u how to do it," Sanchez wrote in one text. Records also show Sanchez had received two prior warnings from his supervisors about improper use of cellphones while in the control cab.

==== Conductor's role ====
The operating rules for trains with a single engineer is that all signals are to be reported to the conductor. This allows the conductor to 'pull the air' (apply the emergency brakes) should the engineer appear to be incapacitated for any reason. However, in this incident, according to the data video, the last two signals were not reported, nor did the conductor apply the brakes.

Unusually, the conductor told the engineer that the starting signal was green, rather than the other way around.

==== NTSB's conclusions and recommendations ====
On January 21, 2010, the NTSB issued a press release announcing its conclusions from the investigation into the collision. In the report, the NTSB concluded that the cause of the crash was most likely the result of the Metrolink engineer's use of text messaging while on duty, which led to the train passing a signal at danger and traveling into the path of the oncoming Union Pacific freight train. In addition, the Board cited the lack of positive train control on the Metrolink train as a contributing factor. The investigation has led the NTSB to recommend that the federal government require the installation of video and audio recording equipment in all locomotive and train operating cabs, and to reiterate its calls for positive train control, which had been on the Board's Wanted List since 1990.

=== Positive train control ===
Positive train control (PTC) is a system of functional requirements for monitoring and controlling train movements and is a type of train protection system. Attention was focused almost immediately about the lack of PTC on equipment involved in the Chatsworth collision; Federal Railroad Administrator Joseph H. Boardman told a reporter days after the crash that PTC "would have stopped the train before there was a collision". The National Transportation Safety Board (NTSB) member leading the investigation also said she was convinced that such a system "would have prevented this accident".

In 2008, Congress passed the Rail Safety Improvement Act of 2008 in direct response to the collision. It required Class I Railroad mainlines with regularly scheduled intercity and commuter rail passenger service to fully implement PTC by December 31, 2015. By 2015, few railroads were anywhere close to implementing PTC and asked for an extension; the deadline was extended to December 31, 2018, with a provision extending compliance to December 31, 2020, if railroads submit plans for doing the work by December 31, 2018. The failure to implement PTC earlier was cited by the Board as a contributing factor in the 2015 Philadelphia train derailment.

Metrolink was the first commuter system to deploy the technology, and it is currently fully active on 341 miles of trackage owned by Metrolink. Regarding the other 171 miles of Metrolink track that are owned by freight lines BNSF and UPRR, the agency states as of 2017 that they are "working towards PTC interoperability".

=== Litigation ===
As the result of a provision in the Amtrak Reform and Accountability Act of 1997 (Pub. L. 105–134 (text) (PDF)), there is a US$200 million cap on the aggregate of all passengers' damage claims in a railroad crash against a passenger railroad, including punitive damages. In dividing the $200 million among the 25 dead and more than 100 injured in the Chatsworth case, Los Angeles Superior Court Judge Peter D. Lichtman, who characterized the awards as "judicial triage", stated victims were undercompensated by at least $64 million, admitting that awards were unlikely to cover future medical expenses.

=== Memorials ===
Unfinished Journeys
In memory of those who have died
With empathy for those affected
In gratitude to those who responded and rescued

— Union Station memorial plaque

Following the collision a temporary, spontaneous memorial of flowers and notes was erected at the Simi Valley Amtrak/Metrolink Station. On September 8, 2009, the first permanent memorial, a plaque, was placed in Union Station. The Metrolink Memorial Plaza was dedicated on September 12, 2009, at the Simi Valley station. The plaza features 11 columns, one each for the ten deceased passengers from Simi Valley and an additional one for the 14 other deceased victims. There are also 25 markers on the grounds to commemorate each victim as well as a seating area and a plaque in remembrance to the 2005 Glendale train crash. Two days later, on the first anniversary of the crash a memorial ceremony was held at Stony Point Park, near the location of the collision.

=== Charles Peck phone calls ===
One of the fatalities of the crash was a 49-year-old customer service agent to Delta Air Lines, Charles E. Peck. After the crash and his death, it was reported that Peck's closest family members received around 35 phone calls, which were just static and indefinite sounds, from his phone and when attempted to call the number back, the calls directly went to voicemail. His phone was never recovered. It was theorised that the phone calls occurred were due to a technical malfunction.

== See also ==
- 2005 Glendale train crash, Metrolink train crash three years earlier, also on the Ventura County Line route.
- Bad Aibling rail accident, 2016 collision in Germany caused by the dispatcher becoming distracted by a game on his cell phone.
- Kirkby train crash, 2021 crash in the United Kingdom in which the train driver was prosecuted for using his cell phone whilst driving.
- List of American railroad accidents
- List of rail accidents (2000–2009)
