= Cotsworth =

Cotsworth or Cotesworth may refer to:

- Cotesworth, historic mansion in North Carrollton, Mississippi
- Cotesworth P. Smith (1807–1862), Associate Justice and Chief Justice of the Supreme Court of Mississippi
- Cotsworth L25S, a James Cycle Co. motorcycle manufactured from 1959 to 1962
- Henry Cotsworth (1918–1942), Australian private who was killed in the Ration Truck massacre
- Moses B. Cotsworth (1859–1943), British accountant, business analyst, and calendar reformer
  - Cotsworth calendar, an International Fixed Calendar model developed by Moses B. Cotsworth
- Staats Cotsworth (1908–1979), American old-time radio actor
- William Cotesworth (1665–1730), Member of Parliament for Great Grimsby

== See also ==
- Chatsworth (disambiguation)
- Coatsworth
