= Positive train control =

Type of train protection system

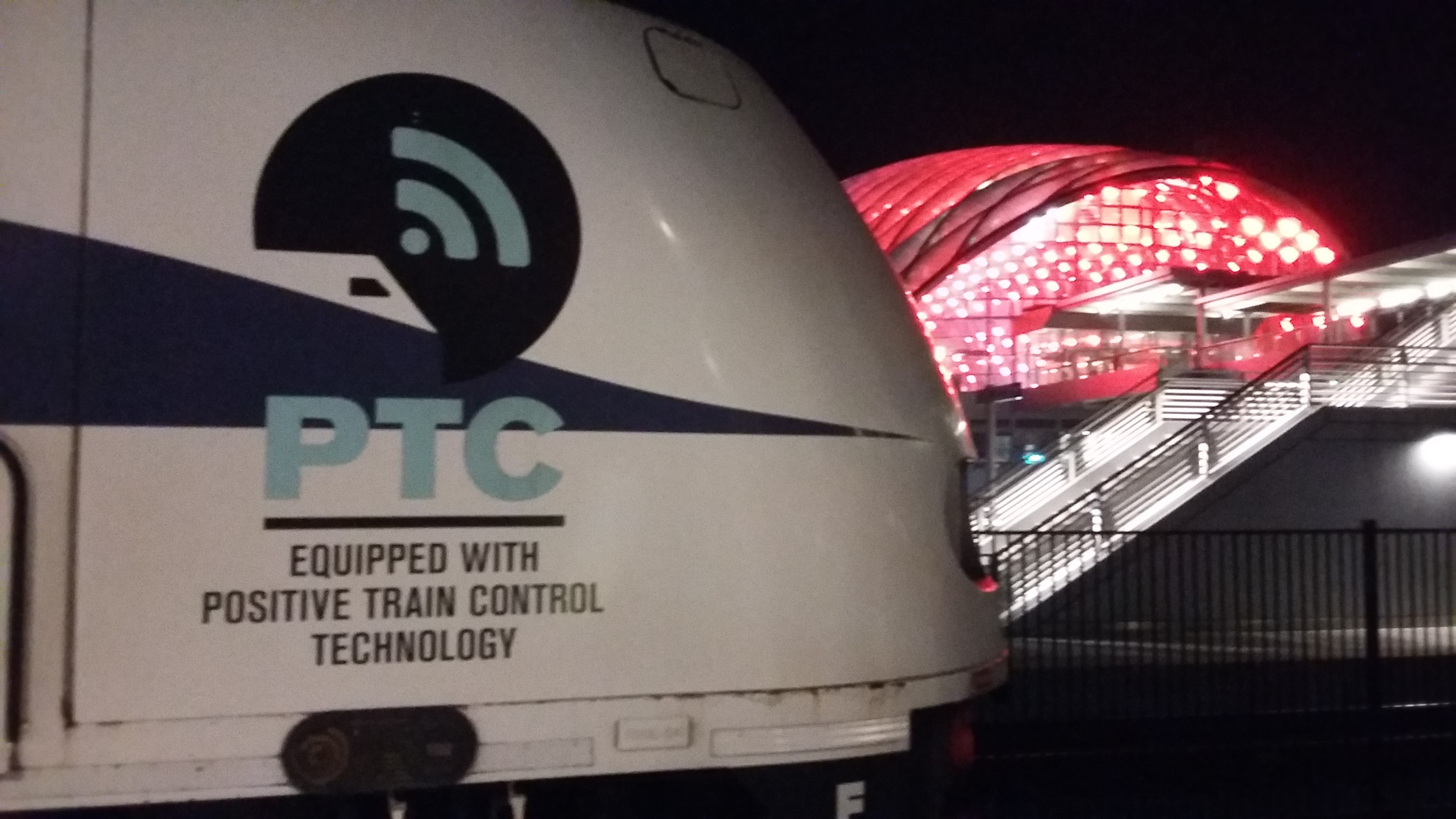
A Metrolink locomotive decal on an MP36PH-3C saying it has positive train control

Positive train control (PTC) is a family of automatic train protection systems deployed in the United States. Most of the US rail network's mileage has a form of PTC. These systems are generally designed to check that trains are moving safely and to stop them when they are not.

Positive train control restricts the train's movement to an explicit allowance; movement is halted upon invalidation. A train operating under PTC receives a movement authority containing information about its location and where it is allowed to safely travel. PTC was installed and operational on 100% of the statutory-required trackage by December 29, 2020.

== Overview ==
The American Railway Engineering and Maintenance-of-Way Association (AREMA) describes positive train control systems as having these primary functions:

- Train separation or collision avoidance
- Line speed enforcement
- Temporary speed restriction enforcement
- Rail worker wayside safety
- Blind spot monitoring

== History ==
=== Background ===
In the late 1980s, interest in train protection solutions heightened after a period of stagnant investment and decline following World War II. Starting in 1990, the United States National Transportation Safety Board (NTSB) counted PTC (then known as positive train separation) among its "Most Wanted List of Transportation Safety Improvements." At the time, the vast majority of rail lines in US relied upon crew members to comply with all safety rules, and a significant fraction of accidents were attributable to human error, as evidenced in several years of official reports from the Federal Railroad Administration (FRA).

In September 2008, Congress considered a new law that set a deadline of December 15, 2015 for implementation of PTC technology across most of the US rail network. The bill, ushered through the legislative process by the Senate Commerce Committee and the House Transportation and Infrastructure Committee, was drafted in response to the collision of a Metrolink passenger train and a Union Pacific Railroad freight train at September 12, 2008, in Los Angeles, which resulted in the deaths of 25 and injuries to more than 135 passengers.

As the bill neared final passage by Congress, the Association of American Railroads (AAR) issued a statement in support of the bill. President George W. Bush signed the 315-page Rail Safety Improvement Act of 2008 into law on October 16, 2008.

=== Provisions of the law ===
Among its provisions, the law provides funding to help pay for the development of PTC technology, limits the number of hours freight rail crews can work each month, and requires the Department of Transportation to determine work hour limits for passenger train crews.

=== Implementation ===
To implement the law, the FRA published initial regulations for PTC systems on January 15, 2010. The agency published amended regulations on August 22, 2014.

In December 2010, the Government Accountability Office (GAO) reported that Amtrak and the major Class I railroads had taken steps to install PTC systems under the law, but commuter rail operators were not on track for the 2015 deadline. As of June 2015, only seven commuter systems (29 percent of those represented by APTA) were expecting to make the deadline. Several factors have delayed implementation, including the need to obtain funding (which was not provided by Congress); the time it has taken to design, test, make interoperable, and manufacture the technology; and the need to obtain radio spectrum along the entire rail network, which involves FCC permission and in some cases negotiating with an existing owner for purchase or lease.

The Metrolink commuter rail system in Southern California is planning to be the first US passenger carrier to install the technology on its entire system. After some delays, demonstration PTC in revenue service began in February 2014; the system is expected to be completed in late summer 2015.

In the Chicago metropolitan area, the Metra system expected it will not be fully compliant with the PTC mandate until 2019.

In October 2015, Congress has passed a bill extending the compliance deadline by three years, to December 31, 2018. President Barack Obama signed the bill on October 29, 2015. Only four railroads met the December 2018 deadline; the other 37 got extensions to December 2020, which was allowed under the law for railroads that demonstrated implementation progress. On December 29, 2020, it was reported that the safeguards had been installed on all required railroads, two days ahead of the deadline.

=== Cost-benefit analysis ===
There is some controversy as to whether PTC makes sense in the form mandated by Congress. Not only is the cost of nationwide PTC installation expected to be as much as US$6–22 billion, most all of it borne by U.S. freight railroads, there are questions as to the reliability and maturity of the technology for all forms of mainline freight trains and high density environments. The PTC requirement could also impose startup barriers to new passenger rail or freight services that would trigger millions of dollars in additional PTC costs. The unfunded mandate also ties the hands of the FRA to adopt a more nuanced or flexible approach to the adoption of PTC technology where it makes the most sense or where it is technically most feasible.

While the FRA Rail Safety Advisory Committee identified several thousand "PPAs" (PTC preventable accidents) on US railroads over a 12-year period, a 2004 cost analysis determined that the accumulated savings to be realized from all of the accidents was not sufficient to cover the cost of PTC across the Class I railroads at that time. The FRA concurred with this cost assessment in its 2009 PTC rulemaking document.

The cost of implementing PTC on up to 25 commuter rail services in the United States has been estimated at over $2 billion and because of these costs, several services are having to cancel or reduce repairs, capital improvements, and service. Other services simply do not have the funds available for PTC and have deferred action assuming some change from Congress. Railroads that operate lines equipped with cab signalling and existing Automatic Train Control systems have argued that their proven track record of safety, which goes back decades, is being discounted because ATC is not as aggressive as PTC in all cases.

=== PTC preventable crashes ===
PTC could have prevented some crashes. In 2013, a Metro-North derailment in the Bronx killed four people and injured 61. This crash was caused by excess speed, something PTC is capable of guarding against. In 2015, an Amtrak derailment in Philadelphia killed eight and injured 185. In this incident, the train accelerated beyond safe speed due to actions of a distracted engineer of the Amtrak train. According to the NTSB, this crash could have been prevented by a PTC system that would have enforced the 50-mile-per-hour (80 km/h) speed limit and prevented the overspeed and subsequent crash of the train. In 2017, another Amtrak derailment near DuPont, Washington, killed three and injured 62. The engineer mistook the train's location, and therefore was not following proper restrictions, failing to notice signage that indicated the speed restrictions in the area. The NTSB learned safety improvements had recently been made to the track, except for the PTC section of the improvements. It was ultimately concluded that the engineer's error in train location lead to the crash. Sound Transit, the owner of the section of railway where the accident occurred, was in the process of installing PTC, but it was not operational at the time of the accident. In 2018, another collision occurred when Amtrak train rammed a stationary freight train in Cayce, South Carolina, killed two crew members and injured 116 others. Chairman of the NTSB, Robert Sumwalt, stated that "an operational PTC is designed to prevent this type of incident."

== Basic operation ==
A typical PTC system involves two basic components:

- Speed display and control unit on the locomotive
- A method to dynamically inform the speed control unit of changing track or signal conditions.

Optionally, three additional components may exist:

- An on-board navigation system and track profile database to enforce fixed speed limits
- A bi-directional data link to inform signaling equipment of the train's presence
- Centralized systems to directly issue movement authorities to trains

=== PTC infrastructure ===
There are two main PTC implementation methods currently being developed. The first makes use of fixed signaling infrastructure such as coded track circuits and wireless transponders to communicate with the onboard speed control unit. The other makes use of wireless data radios spread out along the line to transmit the dynamic information. The wireless implementation also allows for the train to transmit its location to the signaling system which could enable the use of moving or "virtual" blocks. The wireless implementation is generally cheaper in terms of equipment costs, but is considered to be much less reliable than using "harder" communications channels. As of 2007, for example, the wireless ITCS system on Amtrak's Michigan Line was still not functioning reliably after 13 years of development, while the fixed ACSES system has been in daily service on the Northeast Corridor since 2002 (see Amtrak, below).

The fixed infrastructure method is proving popular on high-density passenger lines where pulse code cab signaling has already been installed. In some cases, the lack of a reliance on wireless communications is being touted as a benefit. The wireless method has proven most successful on low density, unsignaled dark territory normally controlled via track warrants, where speeds are already low and interruptions in the wireless connection to the train do not tend to compromise safety or train operations.

Some systems, like Amtrak's ACSES, operate with a hybrid technology that uses wireless links to update temporary speed restrictions or pass certain signals, with neither of these systems being critical for train operations.

=== Locomotive speed control unit ===
The equipment on board the locomotive must continually calculate the train's current speed relative to a speed target some distance away governed by a braking curve. If the train risks not being able to slow to the speed target given the braking curve, the brakes are automatically applied and the train is immediately slowed. The speed targets are updated by information regarding fixed and dynamic speed limits determined by the track profile and signaling system.

Most current PTC implementations also use the speed control unit to store a database of track profiles attached to some sort of navigation system. The unit keeps track of the train's position along the rail line and automatically enforces any speed restrictions as well as the maximum authorized speed. Temporary speed restrictions can be updated before the train departs its terminal or via wireless data links. The track data can also be used to calculate braking curves based on the grade profile. The navigation system can use fixed track beacons or differential GPS stations combined with wheel rotation to accurately determine the train's location on the line within a few feet.

=== Centralized control ===
While some PTC systems interface directly with the existing signal system, others may maintain a set of vital computer systems at a central location that can keep track of trains and issue movement authorities to them directly via a wireless data network. This is often considered to be a form of Communications Based Train Control and is not a necessary part of PTC.

=== Trackside device interface ===
The train may be able to detect the status of (and sometimes control) wayside devices, for example switch positions. This information is sent to the control center to further define the train's safe movements. Text messages and alarm conditions may also be automatically and manually exchanged between the train and the control center. Another capability would allow the employee-in-charge (EIC) to give trains permission to pass through their work zones via a wireless device instead of verbal communications.

=== Technical limitations ===
Even where safety systems such as cab signaling have been present for many decades, the freight railroad industry has been reluctant to fit speed control devices because the often heavy-handed nature of such devices can have an adverse effect on otherwise safe train operation. The advanced processor-based speed control algorithms found in PTC systems claim to be able to properly regulate the speed of freight trains over 5,000 feet (1,500 m) in length and weighing over 10,000 short tons (9,100 t), but concerns remain about taking the final decision out of the hands of skilled railroad engineers. Improper use of the air brake can lead to a train running away, derailment or to an unexpected separation.

Furthermore, an overly conservative PTC system runs the risk of slowing trains below the level at which they had previously been safely operated by human engineers. Railway speeds are calculated with a safety factor such that slight excesses in speed will not result in an accident. If a PTC system applies its own safety margin, then the end result will be an inefficient double safety factor. Moreover, a PTC system might be unable to account for variations in weather conditions or train handling, and might have to assume a worst-case scenario, further decreasing performance. In its 2009 regulatory filing, the FRA stated that PTC was in fact likely to decrease the capacity of freight railroads on many main lines. The European LOCOPROL/LOCOLOC project had shown that EGNOS-enhanced satellite navigation alone was unable to meet the SIL4 safety integrity required for train signaling.

From a purely technical standpoint, PTC will not prevent certain low-speed collisions caused by permissive block operation, accidents caused by "shoving" (reversing with inadequate observation), derailments caused by track or train defect, grade crossing collisions, or collisions with previously derailed trains. Where PTC is installed in the absence of track circuit blocks, it will not detect broken rails, flooded tracks, or dangerous debris fouling the line.

== Wireless implementations ==
=== Radio spectrum availability ===
The wireless infrastructure planned for use by all US Class I freights, most small freight railroads, and many commuter railroads is based on data radios operating in a single frequency band near 220 MHz. A consortium created by two freight railroads called PTC 220 LLC has purchased significant spectrum around 220 MHz, from previous licensees for use in deploying PTC. Some of this spectrum is in the form of nationwide licenses and some is not. The consortium plans to make this spectrum available for use by the US freights, but has indicated as recently as 2011 that they are unsure if they have enough spectrum to meet their needs. Several commuter railroads have begun purchasing 220 MHz spectrum in their geographic areas, but there is widespread concern that the acquisition of enough 220 MHz spectrum may be difficult to accomplish because of a lack of availability, difficulties in negotiating complex multi-party deals to gain enough adjacent spectrum, and because the financial cost of the acquisitions may make the task impossible for some state agencies. However, research suggests that dynamic spectrum allocation can solve the spectrum allocation problem at 220 MHz bandwidth.

Many of the railroads have requested that the FCC reallocate parts of the 220 MHz spectrum to them. They argue that they must have 220 MHz spectrum to be interoperable with each other. The FCC has stated that there is no reallocation forthcoming, that the railroads are not justified in requesting spectrum reallocation because they have not quantified how much spectrum they need, and that the railroads should seek spectrum in the secondary 220 MHz markets or in other bands.

=== Radio band ===
There are no regulatory or technical requirements that demand that 220 MHz be used to implement PTC (if a PTC implementation is to use wireless components at all). If wireless data transmission is necessary, there are a few advantages to the 220 MHz spectrum, provided it can be acquired at a reasonable cost. The first reason to consider using 220 MHz spectrum is PTC interoperability for freights and for some, but not all, commuter rail operations. Freight operations in the US often include the sharing of railroad tracks where one railroad's rail vehicles operate as a guest on another railroad's host tracks. Implementing PTC in such an environment is most easily achieved by using the same PTC equipment, and this includes radios and the associated radio spectrum.

When a commuter railroad operation must operate on a freight railroad territory, the commuter will most likely be required to install PTC equipment (including a radio) on their rail vehicle that is compliant with the freight railroad's PTC system, and this generally means the use of 220 MHz radios and spectrum. If the commuter uses the same PTC equipment, radios, and spectrum on their own property, they will be able to use it when their vehicles travel onto a freight's territory. From a practical standpoint, if the commuter instead elects to use another type of PTC on their own property, they will need to install a second set of onboard equipment so they can operate PTC on their own property while also operating PTC on a freight's property. If a multi-band radio (such as the current generation software-defined radios) is not available, then separate radios and separate antennas will be necessary. With the complexity of track geometries, PTC requires a variable amount of the spectrum in a time critical manner. One way to achieve this is to extend the PTC software-defined radios, such that it has the intelligence to allocate the spectrum dynamically. Adding the intelligence to the radio also helps to improve the security of the PTC communication medium.

If a small freight or commuter railroad does not operate on another railroad territory, then there is no interoperability-based reason that obligates them to use 220 MHz spectrum to implement PTC. In addition, if a small freight or commuter railroad only operates on their own territory and hosts other guest railroads (freight or other passenger rail), there is still no interoperability-based reason the host is obliged to use 220 MHz spectrum to implement PTC. Such a railroad could implement PTC by freely picking any radio spectrum and requiring the guest railroads to either install compliant PTC equipment (including radios) on board their trains or provide wayside equipment for their guest PTC implementation to be installed on the host railroad property. An interesting case that highlights some of these issues is the northeast corridor. Amtrak operates services on two commuter rail properties it does not own: Metro-North Railroad (owned by New York and Connecticut) and Massachusetts Bay Transportation Authority (MBTA) (owned by Massachusetts). In theory, Amtrak could have found themselves installing their own PTC system on these host properties (about 15 percent of the corridor), or worse, found themselves in the ridiculous position of trying to install three different PTC systems on each Amtrak train to traverse the commuter properties. This was not the case. Amtrak had a significant head start over the commuter rail agencies on the corridor in implementing PTC. They spent a considerable amount of time in research and development and won early approvals for their ACSES system on the northeast corridor with the FRA. They chose first to use 900 MHz and then later moved to 220 MHz, in part because of a perceived improvement in radio-system performance and in part because Amtrak was using 220 MHz in Michigan for their ITCS implementation. When the commuter agencies on the corridor looked at options for implementing PTC, many of them chose to take advantage of the advance work Amtrak had done and implement the ACSES solution using 220 MHz. Amtrak's early work paid off and meant that they would be traversing commuter properties that installed the same protocol at the same frequency, making them all interoperable. (Actually most of the Northeast Corridor is owned and operated by Amtrak, not the commuter properties, including the tracks from Washington, D.C. to New York Penn Station and the tracks from Philadelphia to Harrisburg, Pennsylvania. The State of Massachusetts owns the tracks from the Rhode Island state line to the New Hampshire state line, but Amtrak "operates" these lines. Only the line between New York City and New Haven, Connecticut is actually owned and operated by a commuter line.)

One other perceived reason to consider 220 MHz for PTC may be PTC-compatible radio equipment availability. Radio equipment specifically targeted toward PTC is currently only available from a limited number of vendors, and they are focused only on 220 MHz. One radio vendor in particular, Meteorcomm LLC, is able to support Wabtec's I-ETMS (Interoperable Electronic Train Management System) PTC protocol with a 220 MHz radio. Meteorcomm is jointly owned by several of the Class I freights, and some in the industry have indicated that using their 220 MHz radio and associated equipment will be done on a per-site licensing basis. Recurring fees may be associated with this process too. There is further concern that the 'buy in' and licensing fees will be significant, and this has led some to speculate that the owners of Meteorcomm (the freights) may have legal exposure to anti-trust violations. For many railroads, there is no other practical option to meet the federal mandate than to install PTC at 220 MHz using I-ETMS with the Meteorcomm radios. On the northeast corridor, another radio vendor, GE MDS, is able to support the Amtrak ACSES protocol with a 220 MHz radio. It should be stressed that the main concern among the freights regarding the PTC deadline is the availability of PTC equipment. With an eye to anti-trust issues and ready radio availability, Meteorcomm radio designs have been second-sourced to CalAmp radios. This all may mean that there is not enough 220 MHz PTC radio equipment available for all of the railroads that must implement PTC.

There are also issues with the use of these frequencies outside the US; in Canada, 220 MHz remains part of the radioamateur 1.25-metre band.

Other bands besides 220 MHz will support PTC, and have been used to win approvals from the FRA for PTC. When Amtrak received their initial approval, they planned to use 900 MHz frequencies for ACSES. BNSF Railway won its first PTC approvals from the FRA for an early version of ETMS using a multi-band radio that included 45 MHz frequencies, 160 MHz frequencies, 900 MHz frequencies and WiFi. A small freight or commuter that selects one or more of these bands or another one such as 450 MHz might find it easier to acquire spectrum. They will need to research spectrum issues, radio equipment, antennas, and protocol compatibility issues to successfully deploy PTC.

=== Interoperability requirements ===
There is no single defined standard for "interoperable PTC systems". Several examples of interoperable systems illustrate this point. First, the UP and BNSF are interoperable across their systems. They are both implementing I-ETMS and will use different radio frequencies in different locations. In the second example, Amtrak is interoperable with Norfolk Southern in Michigan. Amtrak uses ITCS, while Norfolk Southern uses I-ETMS. To interoperate, two 220 MHz radios are installed in each wayside location and they both interface with a common PTC system through an interface device (similar to a network gateway or protocol converter) at each wayside location. One radio talks to freight trains using I-ETMS and one radio talks to passenger trains using ITCS. In this case interoperability stops at the wayside and does not include the wireless segment out to the rail vehicles or the onboard systems. In the third example, similar to the first, Metrolink, the commuter rail agency in Los Angeles, is implementing I-ETMS and will use the same PTC equipment as both the UP and BNSF. Metrolink is procuring their own 220 MHz spectrum so that trains on Metrolink territory (commuter and freight) will use other channels than those used by the UP and BNSF. Interoperability is achieved by directing the onboard radio to change channels depending on location. For SEPTA, the commuter operation in and around Philadelphia, Ansaldo is implementing ACSES, the Amtrak northeast corridor PTC protocol. For CSX all the ACSES PTC transactions will be handed to CSX at the SEPTA back office, and CSX will be responsible for deploying I-ETMS infrastructure that they will use to communicate with their freight trains. The SEPTA interoperability model is very similar to that of the public safety radio community wherein different radio systems that use different frequencies and protocols are cross-connected only in the back office to support system to system communications.

=== Multi-band solutions ===
For the major freight railroads and Amtrak, the answer seems to be that one frequency band is sufficient. These rail operations measure on-time performance on a much more coarse scale than commuters do so their tolerance for delay is greater and has less impact on train schedules. In addition, the PTC implementations deployed by commuter operations will be running much closer to the performance envelope than that of either Amtrak or the freights. For commuters in particular, there is therefore some concern that implementing PTC with a single frequency band may not be sufficient. The single frequency-band approach to supporting real-time train control has a history of being difficult to use for such applications. This difficulty is not unique to train control. Interference, both man-made and natural, can at times affect the operation of any wireless system that relies on one frequency band. When such wireless systems are employed for real-time control networks it is very difficult to ensure that network performance will not sometimes be impacted. CSX encountered this problem when it experienced propagation ducting problems in its 900 MHz Advanced Train Control System (ATCS) network in the 1990s. The ATCS protocol, which the AAR had recommended the FCC consider as PTC in 2000 (when AAR sought a nationwide 900 MHz "ribbon" license), can support train control operation at both 900 MHz and 160 MHz. The latter frequency band is only used for ATCS on a few subdivisions and shortlines. More recently, the industry had been moving toward a more robust multi-band radio solution for data applications such as PTC. In 2007, BNSF first won FRA approval for their original ETMS PTC system using a multi frequency-band radio. In addition, in mid-2008, an FRA sponsored effort by the AAR to develop a Higher Performance Data Radio (HPDR) for use at 160 MHz actually resulted in a contract being awarded to Meteorcomm for a 4-band radio to be used for voice and data. These more recent multi-band radio efforts were shelved in late 2008, after the Rail Safety Improvements Act became law, and the freights decided to pursue PTC using 220 MHz alone, in a single frequency-band configuration. Amtrak and most commuter operations quickly followed suit, selecting 220 MHz.

=== Suitability of wireless PTC for commuter rail ===
Soon after the Rail Safety Improvements Act was passed, many commuter railroads chose not to develop their own PTC protocol and instead decided to save time and money by using a protocol developed for either freight or long haul passenger (Amtrak) operations. Deploying such a protocol for urban commuter operation, where it will be necessary to support numerous, small, fast-moving trains, will be a challenge. It remains to be seen whether the performance envelope of PTC protocols developed and optimized for less numerous, slower and/or larger trains can support a more complex operational scenario, such as that of a commuter rail operation, without impacting on-time performance. Detailed and exhaustive protocol simulation testing can ease the risk of problems, however, there are too many variables, especially when the wireless component is considered, to guarantee beforehand that under certain worst-case operational profiles in certain locations, train operations will not be impacted. In fact, during system acceptance testing, such worst-case operational profiles may not even be tested because of the effort involved. One need only consider what it would take to identify the PTC protocol train capacity limitations at each interlocking of a large commuter rail operation when a train is broken down at the interlocking and 10–20 other trains are within communications range of a single wayside location. Such a what-if scenario may be tested at a few interlockings but not at the 30 or more interlockings on a large commuter property.

=== Open standards ===
A large group of industry experts from the federal government, manufacturers, railroads, and consultants are participating in a study group sponsored by the IEEE 802.15 working group, to look at using lessons learned in protocol development in the IEEE 802 suite to propose a comprehensive solution to the wireless component of PTC. While this effort may not significantly change the current United States PTC efforts already underway, an open standard could possibly provide a way forward for all of the railroads to eventually deploy a more interoperable, robust, reliable, future-proof, and scalable solution for the wireless component of PTC.

=== Upgrade costs ===
The railroad industry, like the process industry and the power utility industry, has always demanded that the return on investment for large capital investments associated with infrastructure improvements be fully realized before the asset is decommissioned and replaced. This paradigm will be applied to PTC as well. It is highly unlikely that there will be any major upgrades to initial PTC deployments within even the first 10 years. The calculation for return on investment is not a simple one and some railroads may determine, for instance after five years, that an upgrade of certain components of PTC may be justified. An example could be the radio component of PTC. If an open standard creates a less expensive radio product that is backwards compatible to existing systems and that perhaps improves PTC system performance and also includes improvements that save on operational costs, then a railroad would be prudent to consider a plan for replacing their PTC radios.

== Deployment ==
=== Alaska Railroad ===
Wabtec is working with the Alaska Railroad to develop a collision-avoidance, Vital PTC system, for use on their locomotives. The system is designed to prevent train-to-train collisions, enforce speed limits, and protect roadway workers and equipment. Wabtec's Electronic Train Management System, (ETMS) is also designed to work with the Wabtec TMDS dispatching system to provide train control and dispatching operations from Anchorage.

Data between locomotive and dispatcher is transmitted over a digital radio system provided by Meteor Communications Corp (Meteorcomm). An onboard computer alerts workers to approaching restrictions and to stop the train if needed.

=== Amtrak ===
Alstom's and PHW's Advanced Civil Speed Enforcement System (ACSES) system is installed on parts of Amtrak's Northeast Corridor between Washington and Boston. ACSES enhances the cab signaling systems provided by PHW Inc. It uses passive transponders to enforce permanent civil speed restrictions. The system is designed to prevent train-to-train collisions (PTS), protection against overspeed and protect work crews with temporary speed restrictions.

GE Transportation Systems' Incremental Train Control System (ITCS) is installed on Amtrak's Michigan line, allowing trains to travel at 110 mph (180 km/h).

The 2015 Philadelphia train derailment could have been prevented had positive train control been implemented correctly on the section of track that train was travelling. The overspeed warning/penalty commands were not set up on that particular section of track although it was set up elsewhere.

=== Burlington Northern and Santa Fe (BNSF) ===
Wabtec's Interoperable Electronic Train Management System (I-ETMS) is installed on a segment of the BNSF Railway. It is an overlay technology that augments existing train control methods. I-ETMS uses GPS for positioning and a digital radio system to monitor train location and speed. It is designed to prevent certain types of accidents, including train collisions. The system includes an in-cab display screen that warns of a problem and then automatically stops the train if appropriate action is not taken.

=== CSX ===
CSX Transportation is developing a Communications-Based Train Management (CBTM) system to improve the safety of its rail operations. CBTM is the predecessor to ETMS.

=== Kansas City Southern (KCS) ===
Wabtec's Electronic Train Management System, (ETMS) will provide PTC solutions in conjunction with Wabtec's Train Management and Dispatch System (TMDS), which has served as KCS's dispatch solution since 2007, for all U.S. based rail operations along the KCS line. In January 2015, KCS began training personnel on PTC at its TEaM Training Center in Shreveport, La., with an initial class of 160 people.

=== Massachusetts Bay Transportation Authority (MBTA) ===
Most MBTA Commuter Rail locomotives and cab cars, except for the 1625–1652 series Bombardier control cars and the (now retired) 1000–1017 series F40PH locomotives, are equipped with the PTC compliant ACSES technology which is installed on the Amtrak Northeast Corridor. All MBTA trains traveling on any segment of the Northeast Corridor must be equipped with functioning ACSES onboard apparatus, which affects trains on Providence/Stoughton Line, Franklin/Foxboro Line and Needham Line routings. The MBTA shut down some lines on weekends in 2017 and 2018 to meet a December 2020 federal deadline for full-system PTC.

=== Metropolitan Transportation Authority (MTA) ===
In November 2013 the New York Metropolitan Transportation Authority signed a $428 million contract to install positive train control on the Long Island Rail Road and the Metro-North Railroad to a consortium of Bombardier Transportation Rail Control Solutions and Siemens Rail Automation. The LIRR and Metro-North installations will include modifications and upgrades of the existing signal systems and the addition of ACSES II equipment. Siemens stated that the PTC installation would be completed by December 2015, but this deadline was not achieved. Installation was not completed until the end of 2020.

=== New Jersey Transit (NJT) ===
Ansaldo STS USA Inc's Advanced Speed Enforcement System (ASES) is being installed on New Jersey Transit commuter lines. It is coordinated with Alstom's ACSES so that trains can operate on the Northeast Corridor.

=== Norfolk Southern (NS) ===
Norfolk Southern Railway began work on the system in 2008 with Wabtec Railway electronics to start developing a plan to implement Positive Train Control on NS rails. NS has already implemented PTC on 6,310 miles of track with plans to achieve it on 8,000 miles of track. NS has requested an extension on the time to have PTC active on its miles of track due to the need to work more on areas with no track signals, as well as making provisions for smaller railroads that the company does business with to be PTC capable. NS keeps experiencing issues with the system and wants to take the proper time to fix the system to ensure the safety of its employees and all others using their tracks. NS has been adding and updating its locomotives with PTC capable computers to allow those locomotives for use on mainlines. 2,900 locomotives out of the almost 4,000 the company has have been fitted with the PTC capable computers. NS plans to put at least 500 locomotives into storage using precision NS has been updating it trackside equipment such as radio towers and control point lighting to assist in PTC operations on the railroad. With the new computers on the locomotives it allows the locomotives to interact with each other and trackside systems. Norfolk Southern's General Electric Transportation locomotives are equipped with GPS to aid in the use of PTC. All of NS's locomotives are equipped with Energy Management a computer system that provides real time data on the locomotive. The system can also control train speed and brake systems on board. The EM system allows the locatives to use less fuel and be more efficient. NS's final goal is completely autonomous operations of their trains. This system will be used alongside Auto-router used to route train movements with little to no human interactions. With these two systems integrated with PTC it allows for more precise movement and train control across the railroad. NS, Union Pacific, CSXT, BNSF, and Virginia Railway Express have been testing interoperation to make sure each companies PTC systems work with each other to ensure safe railroad travel. For this a NS train on CSXT tracks has to act like a CSXT train would or vice versa. That requires the railroads to use the same communications and radio frequencies for everything to operate smoothly. Nearly 3,000 locomotives have been fitted with the PTC capable computers.

=== Peninsula Corridor Joint Powers Board (Caltrain) ===
Caltrain's Communications Based Overlay Signal System (CBOSS) has been installed but not fully tested along the Peninsula Corridor between San Francisco, San Jose and Gilroy, California. Caltrain had selected Parsons Transportation Group (PTG), who had been working on a similar system for Metrolink in Southern California, to implement, install, and test CBOSS in November 2011. In February 2017, Caltrain's board canceled the contract with PTG for failure to meet the scheduled 2015 deadline. PTG and Caltrain would go on to file lawsuits for breach of contract. At its board of directors meeting on 1 March 2018, Caltrain announced that it will be awarding a contract to Wabtec for implementation of I-ETMS. The completed Caltrain PTC system was certified by the FRA in December 2020.

=== Regional Transportation District (RTD) ===
Positive Train Control (PTC) and vehicle monitoring system technologies have been developed for the Denver Metro Area's new commuter train lines that began opening in 2016. After the University of Colorado A Line opened on 22 April 2016 between Denver Union Station and Denver International Airport, it experienced a series of issues related to having to adjust the length of unpowered gaps between different overhead power sections, direct lightning strikes, snagging wires, and crossing signals behaving unexpectedly. In response to the crossing issues, Denver Transit Partners, the contractor building and operating the A Line, stationed crossing guards at each place where the A line crosses local streets at grade, while it continued to explore software revisions and other fixes to address the underlying issues. The FRA required frequent progress reports, but allowed RTD to open its B Line as originally scheduled on 25 July 2016, because the B Line only has one at-grade crossing along its current route. However, FRA halted testing on the longer G Line to Wheat Ridge – originally scheduled to open in Fall 2016 – until more progress could be shown resolving the A Line crossing issues. G Line testing resumed in January 2018, though the A Line continued to operate under a waiver. The G Line opened to passenger service on 26 April 2019.

=== Sonoma-Marin Area Rail Transit (SMART) ===
Positive train control has been implemented at Sonoma–Marin Area Rail Transit's 63 crossings for the length of the initial 43-mile (69 km) passenger corridor which began regular service on 25 August 2017 after the FRA gave its final approval for SMART's PTC system. SMART uses the E-ATC system for its PTC implementation.

=== Southeastern Pennsylvania Transportation Authority (SEPTA) ===
SEPTA received approval from the FRA on 28 February 2016 to launch PTC on its Regional Rail lines. On 18 April 2016, SEPTA launched PTC on the Warminster Line, the first line to use the system. Over the course of 2016 and into 2017, PTC was rolled out onto different Regional Rail lines. On 1 May 2017, the Paoli/Thorndale Line, Trenton Line, and Wilmington/Newark Line (all of which run on Amtrak tracks) received PTC, the last of the Regional Rail lines to receive the system.

=== Southern California Regional Rail Authority (Metrolink) ===
Metrolink, the Southern California commuter rail system involved in the 2008 Chatsworth train collision that provided the impetus for the Rail Safety Improvement Act of 2008, was the first passenger rail system to fully implement positive train control. In October 2010, Metrolink awarded a $120 million contract to PTG to design, procure, and install PTC. PTG designed a PTC system that used GPS technology informing position to on-board train computers, which communicate wirelessly with wayside signals and a central office. Metrolink anticipated placing PTC in revenue service by summer 2013. However, Parsons announced the FRA had authorized Metrolink to operate PTC RSD using Wabtec's I-ETMS in revenue service on the San Bernardino line in March 2015. Metrolink announced PTC had been installed on all owned right-of-way miles by June 2015, and was working to install the system on tracks shared with Amtrak, freight, and other passenger rail partners.

=== Union Pacific (UP) ===
In the 1990s, Union Pacific Railroad (UP) had a partnership project with General Electric to implement a similar system known as "Precision Train Control." This system would have involved moving block operation, which adjusts a "safe zone" around a train based on its speed and location. The similar abbreviations have sometimes caused confusion over the definition of the technology. GE later abandoned the Precision Train Control platform.

In 2008, a team of Lockheed Martin, Wabtec, and Ansaldo STS USA Inc installed an ITCS subsystem on a 120-mile segment of UP track between Chicago and St. Louis. Other major software companies, such as PK Global, Tech Mahindra, are also some of the strategic IT partners in development of PTC systems.

As of 31 December 2017, Union Pacific Installed 99 percent, or more than 17,000 miles, of total route miles with PTC signal hardware. Union Pacific has partially installed PTC hardware on about 98 percent of its 5,515 locomotives earmarked for the same technology and have equipped and commissioned 4,220 locomotives with PTC hardware and software. Union Pacific has also installed 100 percent of the wayside antennas needed to support PTC along the company's right of way.

Union Pacific had also equipped steam locomotive 4014 with its own PTC system in July 2024, mounting the necessary hardware in a new compartment of the tender. This allows the steam locomotive to participate in the PTC network while operating unassisted whereas from 2021 on it had been relying on PTC equipment carried in an assisting diesel locomotive.

=== In other countries ===
PTC is also used outside the United States. Notable examples include:

- TasRail's network in Tasmania, Australia
- In Western Australia, on the privately owned Fortescue railway line.
- Panama Canal Railway
- Mozambique Ports and Railways
