= Pulled tail =

Railway colloquialism

Pulled tail is the colloquialism referring to the act of a guard or conductor of a railway to apply the emergency brakes when something unexpected has been noticed. This could be an excess of speed in a section of line known to have a lower speed, or strange noises and shaking that might indicate that the train has derailed or something has broken.

In the United States, local colloquialisms include 'pull the air' or 'big hole' as verb phrases describing this same action. In the UK, colloquially the guard would drop the tap and the passenger pull the chain to apply the emergency brake.

== Other uses ==
In the days before modern electrical communications, applying the emergency brakes briefly was a way the guard could communicate to the driver that (for instance) a conditional stop was required at the next station.

== Accidents preventable ==
Accidents preventable by pulling the tail:

- Waterfall train disaster – driver was incapacitated and the sleeping guard failed to dump the air.
- Eschede train disaster – conductor fails to act quickly on passenger's report of strange occurrence.
- Sutton Coldfield rail crash – guard (conductor) made a brief brake application, but was reluctant to take control from the driver.
- 2008 Chatsworth train collision – Engineer (Driver) did not report last two signals as required by rules, but the conductor (guard) did not pull tail.

== Accidents caused by pulling the tail ==
- Winsford (1948) – A soldier on leave, himself a former signalbox worker, pulled the chain (emergency brake) of the train in order to exploit a short cut to their home. It took some time for train crew to find and rectify the triggered brake. In the meantime, a following train ran past a red signal and collided with the first trains, causing casualties. The soldier admitted to pulling the emergency cord without good reason.
- Norton Fitzwarren rail crash (1940) – strange noises on second train, chain pulled, nothing found, train restarted.
- In the Violet Town railway disaster, there was no train radio for the driver to report the position of signals to the guard, while the guard in the rear car would have a poor, if any, view of the green signals. Signals change to red as the engine passes them, so that the guard rarely has a good view of yellow or green signals. It is not clear if any intercom connected the driver and guard.

== See also ==
- ATP
- Stop and examine
- Lists of rail accidents
