= 1998 Concord West derailment =

1998 railway derailment in Sydney, Australia

- The wreck of the lead carriage

Details
- Date: 9 June 1998; 4:25 am
- Location: Concord West, New South Wales
- Country: Australia
- Operator: CityRail
- Incident type: Derailment

Statistics
- Trains: 1
- Vehicles: 1
- Injured: 2

At approximately 4:25 am AEST on 9 June 1998, an eight-carriage CityRail Tangara T set consisting of two coupled individual sets derailed near Concord West station, an Inner West suburb of Sydney, Australia. The train was found to be travelling at an excess of 100 kilometres per hour (62 mph) while approaching Concord West station through the residential area, when the first carriage derailed, resting on its side after jackknifing.

Seven of the eight carriages derailed, an the clean-up took two days. There were no deaths, as driver was seriously injured and the guard only received minor injuries.

== Incident ==
In the very early morning of 9 June 1998, a Tangara T set departed Hornsby Car Sheds bound for Strathfield to commence a passenger service. The train consisted of two separate sets coupled together. At around 4:20 am, train then was diverted onto a relief line between North Strathfield and Concord West, where it reached a speed of 110 kilometres per hour (68 mph) which is 100 kilometres per hour (62 mph) over the speed limit of the relief line.

At 4:25 am, the first carriage of the train, D6114, had started to derail and collapsed on its side. Due to the momentum and speed of the seven other carriages, the first carriage jackknifed, subsequently causing some of the other carriages to derail. N5113 and D6113, the third and fourth carriages respectively, zig-zagged onto Queen Street, the street adjacent to the railway. This caused the power lines to go down when the train destroyed an overhead stanchion. The street was closed and all, but the last carriage, D6173, derailed.

== Post-incident ==
=== Clean-up ===
An 81 class locomotive, 8151, was sent later in the day to tow carriages D6173 and N5173 away to Hornsby Maintenance Centre. They were the two rear carriages.

The following day, carriages N5174 and N5113 were loaded onto a low-loader truck to be sent for repair evaluation at Auburn Maintenance Centre. N5114, the second car, was lifted onto Queen Street by a crane to wait for the low loader to return.

D6114 was lifted off from the rails by running a chain through the door, and was written off due to extensive damage.

=== Aftermath ===
A spokesman for the State Rail Authority said that the train should've entered the siding at a speed of 25 kilometres per hour (16 mph). It was believed that the driver had misread the signals, which might have been the cause for its very high speed.

An inquiry was the launched and chaired by the State Rail Authority, Rail Services Australia and the Rail Access Corporation.

== See also ==
- 1989 Wentworthville derailment — Involved a Tangara under similar circumstances.
- 2003 Waterfall rail accident — Involved a Tangara under similar circumstances.
- Railway accidents and incidents in New South Wales — a list of railway incidents.
