= Coatsworth =

Coatsworth is a surname. Notable people with the surname include:

- Elizabeth Coatsworth (1893–1986), American author of children's fiction and poetry
- Emerson Coatsworth (1854–1943), Canadian lawyer and politician
- Gary Coatsworth (born 1968), English former footballer
- John Henry Coatsworth (born 1940), historian of Latin America and the provost of Columbia University
- Leonard Coatsworth, the last person to drive on the Tacoma Narrows Bridge (1940) before its collapse
- Lucien Coatsworth Gause (1836–1880), nineteenth century politician and lawyer from Arkansas
- Moira Coatsworth (born 1953), President of the New Zealand Labour Party
- Nick Coatsworth, Australian infectious diseases expert

== See also ==
- Chatsworth (disambiguation)
- Cotsworth (disambiguation)
