= Rail Safety Improvement Act of 2008 =

- Long title: An Act to amend title 49, United States Code, to prevent railroad fatalities, injuries, and hazardous materials releases, to authorize the Federal Railroad Safety Administration, and for other purposes.
- Enacted by: the 110th United States Congress

Citations
- Public law: Pub. L. 110–432 (text) (PDF)
- Statutes at Large: 122 Stat. 4848

Codification
- Titles amended: 49 U.S.C.

Legislative history
- Introduced in the House as H.R. 2095 by Jim Oberstar (D–MN) on May 1, 2007; Committee consideration by House Transportation and Infrastructure; Senate Commerce, Science, and Transportation; Passed the House on October 17, 2007 (377-38); Passed the Senate on August 1, 2008 (unan. consent) with amendment; House agreed to Senate amendment on September 24, 2008 (H.Res. 1492) with further amendment; Senate agreed to House amendment on October 1, 2008 (74-24); Signed into law by President George W. Bush on October 16, 2008

The Rail Safety Improvement Act of 2008 is a United States federal law, enacted by Congress to improve railroad safety. Among its provisions, the most notable was the mandate requiring positive train control (PTC) technology to be installed on most of the US railroad network by 2015. This was spurred by the 2008 Chatsworth train collision the month prior to passage of the act. After two delays, the technology was operational on all required railroads by the end of 2020.

== Background ==
Starting in 1990, the National Transportation Safety Board (NTSB) counted PTC among its "Most Wanted List of Transportation Safety Improvements." At the time, the vast majority of rail lines relied on the human crew to comply with all safety rules, and a significant fraction of accidents were attributable to human error.

In September 2008, Congress considered a new rail safety law that set a deadline of 2015 for implementation of PTC technology across most of the U.S. rail network. The bill, ushered through the legislative process by the Senate Commerce Committee and the House Transportation and Infrastructure Committee, was developed in response to the collision of a Metrolink passenger train and a Union Pacific freight train September 12, 2008, in California, which resulted in the deaths of 25 and injuries to more than 135 passengers.

As the bill neared final passage by Congress, the Association of American Railroads (AAR) issued a statement in support of the bill. President George W. Bush signed the 315-page Rail Safety Improvement Act into law on October 16, 2008.

== Provisions of the law ==
Among its provisions, the law provides funding to help pay for the development of PTC technology, limits the number of hours freight rail crews can work each month, and requires the Department of Transportation to determine work hour limits for passenger train crews.

== Implementation ==
To implement the law, the Federal Railroad Administration (FRA) published final regulations for PTC systems on January 15, 2010.

In December 2010, the U.S. Government Accountability Office (GAO) reported that Amtrak and the major Class I railroads had taken steps to install PTC systems under the law, but that the work may not be complete by the 2015 deadline. The railroads and their suppliers were continuing to develop software to test various system components, which could delay equipment installation. GAO also suggested that publicly funded commuter railroads will have difficulty in obtaining funds to pay for their system components.

In October 2015, Congress passed a bill extending the compliance deadline by three years, to December 31, 2018. President Barack Obama signed the bill on October 29, 2015. Only four railroads met the December 2018 deadline; the other 37 got extensions to December 2020, which was allowed under the law for railroads that demonstrated implementation progress. On December 29, 2020, it was reported that the safeguards had been installed on all required railroads, two days ahead of the deadline.

== See also ==
- Dark territory (unsignalled sections of track)
- North American railway signalling
- Transportation safety in the United States
- Department of Transportation v. Association of American Railroads
