= Split shift =

A split shift is a type of shift-work schedule where a person's work day is split into two or more parts. A regular break for rest or to eat meals does not count as a "split".

For example, a person may work from 05:00 to 09:00, take a break until 14:00 and then return to work until 19:00. This kind of pattern is especially common for people such as public transport employees (where it is advantageous to have additional staff working during traditional rush hour times) or bar staff that work at lunchtimes and during the evening.

== Workers ==
About 3% of Americans work a split shift. This work schedule is followed by about 9% of workers in the transportation, utilities, and agriculture industries.

They are common among people who primarily work in the evening. Workers on this schedule are more likely to be subject to mandatory overtime.

People working split shifts are just as likely to be men or women, and equally likely to be parents of small children. Married Americans are somewhat more likely to work a split or rotating schedule than single people.

== Effects ==
Split shifts can tie employees to work for extended periods, and the time in between shifts can be lost traveling to and from work. People working split shifts report somewhat more work–family conflict, such as not being able to spend as much time with their children, than people on a regular work schedule, and slightly more than people on a rotating work schedule. Work stress is not increased by working a split shift.

However, there are also benefits for some workers. For example, California law requires employers to pay the equivalent of one extra hour's pay to most employees who are working split shifts. Some workers may prefer regularly scheduled split shifts to provide a break for other activities, such as caring for children after the end of the school day and before the other parent gets off work.

== See also ==
- Shift plan
