= Emergency brake (train) =

Device to stop a train quickly

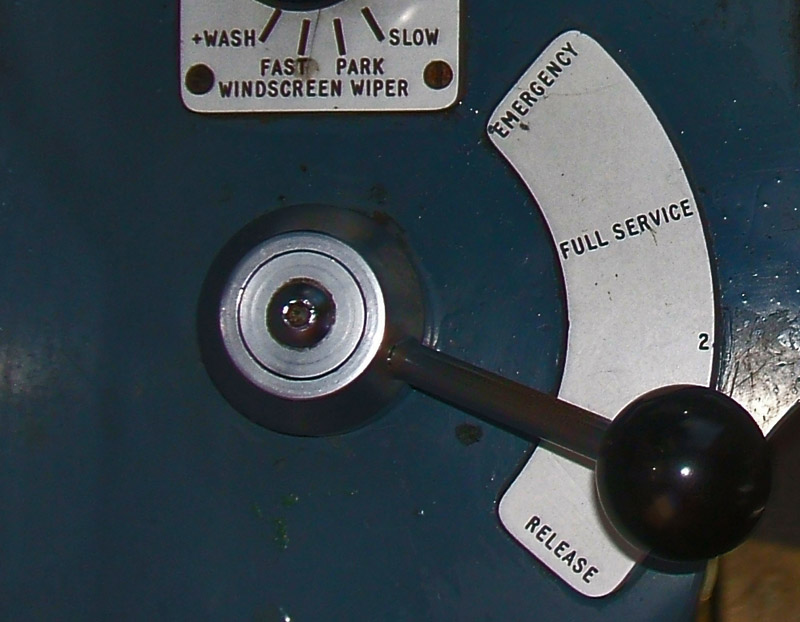
Driver's brake handle in a class 317 electric multiple unit

On trains, the expression emergency brake has several meanings:

- The maximum brake force available to the engine driver from the conventional braking system, usually operated by taking the brake handle to its furthest position, through a gate mechanism, or by pushing a separate plunger in the cab.
- A completely separate mechanism from the conventional braking system, designed to stop the train as quickly as possible.
- A handle or plunger which may be applied by a passenger in an emergency, either stopping the train directly or sending an alarm to the driver so that they can stop the train.

Industry vernacular for when the emergency brake is applied is go into emergency, as in phrases like "the train may fail to go into emergency" or "the ability of the train to go into emergency is paramount".

The emergency brake applies considerably more braking force than the standard full-service brake. The engine driver or motorman will only use the emergency brake as a last resort, since it may cause damage; even with modern wheel slide protection, a train may develop wheel-flats, and the rails themselves can suffer profile damage.

== Possible consequences of operation ==
Putting the engine driver's brake handle into the emergency position may also:

- Shut off traction power
- On an electric train, drop the pantograph if the power supply is overhead-wire traction current, or raise the pickup shoes where the supply is third rail traction current
- Disable dynamic braking
- Prevent the brakes from being released until the train has stopped
- Connect the brake wires to ground, to prevent a "false-feed" voltage from releasing the brakes
- Send an emergency radio signal, if the brake handle has been in the emergency position for over 30 seconds
- Activate the sander
- Activate the train horn until the selector is placed out of the emergency position

== Passenger-applied brakes ==
Trains often have a facility in each car to enable passengers to apply the brakes in case of emergency. In many modern trains, the driver is able to prevent brake activation when a passenger operates the emergency alarm - an audible warning is sounded, and the driver is then able to talk to the person who activated the alarm on the intercom and see them on an internal CCTV. The driver can press an override button and hold the brakes off whilst they choose a safe place to stop the train. Because of possible serious problems, severe fines and/or imprisonment penalties are in place to deter people from activating the brake without good reason.

=== Mechanism on locomotive-hauled stock with brake pipe ===
The alarm chain in a passenger coach is designed to create a break in the continuity of the brake pipes (whether vacuum or air brakes), immediately resulting in a loss of brake pressure (or vacuum) and thereby causing the train brakes to be applied. With vacuum brakes, a clappet valve is provided, which is released by the pulling of the alarm chain; with air brakes, there is a similar passenger emergency valve which can vent the brake pipe to the air.

In most locomotives (in addition to a warning lamp or buzzer being sounded) the master controller undergoes auto-regression, with the notches falling to zero rapidly as the locomotive's motive power is switched off. The guard may also notice the loss of brake pressure (although they may not know it is due to the pulling of the alarm chain) and is expected to apply their brakes immediately as well. It is possible for a driver to override the alarm-chain pull; this is sometimes done where it is known that miscreants resort to pulling the emergency chain solely to get the train to stop at a point convenient for themselves. However, such an act by the driver (or guard) of deliberately ignoring an indication of alarm-chain pulling is a serious matter.

In recent years locomotives have been fitted with emergency flashers on the roof of the cab, and these flashers are also activated when the brake pipe pressure is lost for any reason other than the driver's application of the brake valve. This alerts drivers of oncoming trains of the possibility of a derailed or parted rake which may foul other tracks (since brake pressure may have been lost for those reasons as well); at the locomotive, it is not possible to tell whether the loss of brake pressure is due to the pulling of the alarm chain.

ACP (alarm chain pulling) also causes a small lever to be released near the emergency brake valve (usually mounted near one end of the coach), which does not retract to its normal position even when the chain is released. This allows the driver (or guard) to find out in which coach the ACP actually occurred. When the coach is isolated, the lever needs to be manually reset. Until this is done, the lamp and buzzer in the locomotive cab are continuously activated. A circuit breaker controls the lamp and alarm bell in the locomotive cab; in cases where defective equipment causes the lamp and bell to go off, the driver can disable them by placing the MCB (miniature circuit breaker) in the "Off" position. Despite the obvious safety hazards, sometimes this is resorted to by drivers when driving trains through sections where spurious ACP incidents are very common.

== Around the world ==
=== Germany ===
The Regelung B009 NBÜ Rev 3.1 defines a set of nested state machines in the chapter “Anlage 1: Phasen einer Zugfahrt“, reflecting a very wide range of use cases, including platforms, tunnels, etc. and is applicable for subways, trams, metros(S-Bahn), as it implements appropriate actions for all use cases occurring in rail transportation. These state machines represents the state of the art in Germany, it is highly recommended to be implemented or retrofitted to avoid the problems experienced at the S-Bahn Rhine-Neckar.

In Germany, passenger vehicles “must have easily visible and reachable emergency brake handles”. It is allowed that the emergency brake can be reset, on S-Bahn vehicles (i.e. Classes 420, 423, 425, 480 or 481) it's allowed to only result in a display when used outside of platforms. The implementation of the S-Bahn's emergency brake however does currently not reflect the state of the art in Germany, it has failed in practical use at least in one instance 2015, as a driver lost consciousness completely, but still accidentally triggered the vigilance device. Unlike the System NBÜ2004, which is used in conventional trains, the brake was not activated, because it is only an indicator light and a sound, while the train is running on the track. Without ATP enabled or over-speed, the described incident may have been leading to fatalities and substantial damage, as the passengers noticed the unconscious driver, but could not stop the train by pulling the emergency-brake-handle. Using the NBÜ2004, as used in regional- and long-distance-trains, this would have been prevented, a "overwrite" response is needed, typically the "FÜ"(Filling) position of the automatic brake-lever, otherwise the trains brake-computer will perform an emergency-brake after 10 seconds.

Equipment for this override (NBÜ) is necessary in tunnels above 1000 m. For regional trains, UIC 541-5 is not sufficient since 2011, long distance trains must at least be equipped with UIC 541-5. The sections where not to stop are marked with yellow bars on the kilometer signs. Regional trains, except MUs, are usually equipped with NBÜ 2004, which results in a display and a break a few seconds later if the train driver doesn't respond. For DB Regio, the rules for the staff are given in Ril 494. Long distance trains are mostly equipped with system DB, which uses the UIC 558 control wire, which results in conflicts with some door control systems and is therefore not used in regional trains. In MUs, usually a special implementation is used.

For trams, emergency brakes are also necessary. In tunnels and track sections without safety area, using them outside a station may stop the tram at the next platform instead of immediately.

=== India ===
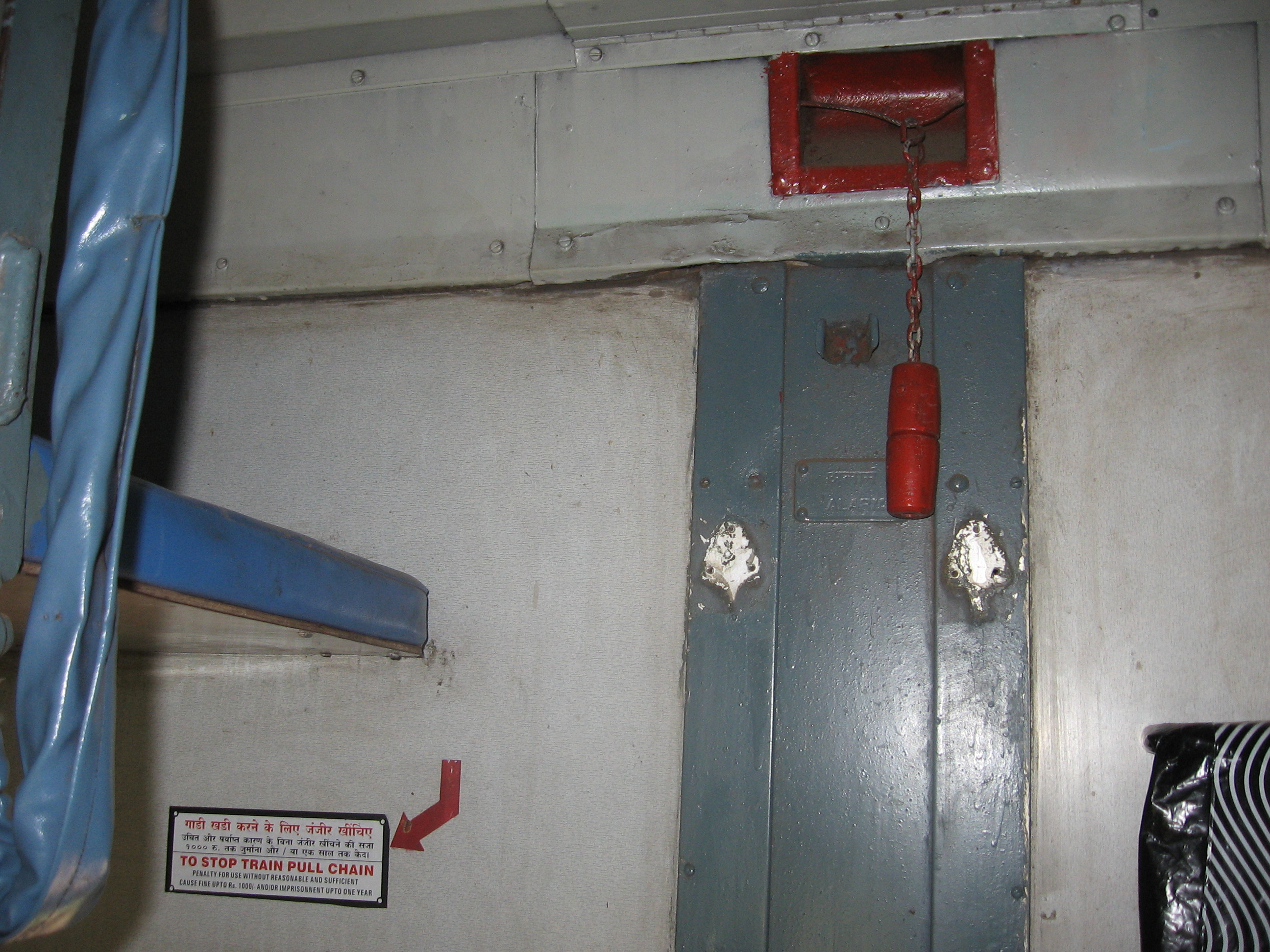
Emergency brake on a train in India

Chain-pulling is the act of pulling a cord that activates the train's emergency brakes to stop a train, whether for a genuine emergency or (often) illegally for someone to get on or off the train on the Indian Railways network. Illegal chain-pulling is a serious problem on Indian Railways; where miscreants do so to make unscheduled stops near their destination, which delays trains. Penalties for misuse of this facility include a fine of Rs. 1,000 and/or imprisonment up to one year. In an effort to improve the service, former President of India Dr. A. P. J. Abdul Kalam proposed an alternate method wherein a passenger in an emergency communicates with the guard and driver of the train.

=== United States ===
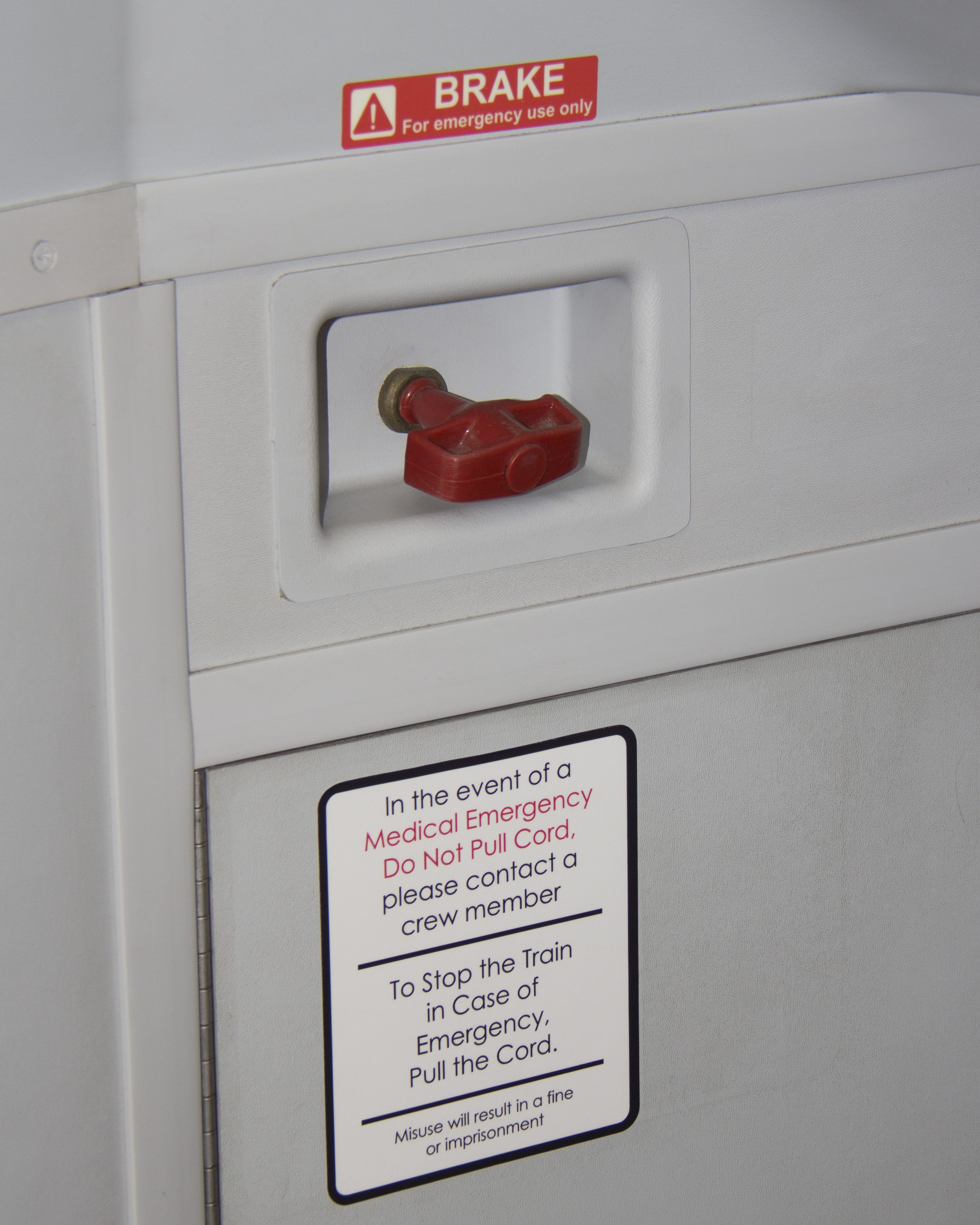
Emergency Brake Handle on Bombardier commuter rail equipment, Sounder, Seattle, WA

In the United States, an emergency stop cord is not used. Any visible cord running within the body of a railway car would have been what was known as the "communicating cord". This was a method of signalling the engine operator (known in the US as the "engineer"). Unlike other countries, it was never intended for use by passengers. It had its own code of signals, similar to engine whistle signals. Drivers receiving an unusual, or unidentifiable, communicating signal might stop the train, perhaps as a "normal stop" or an "emergency application", at their discretion. A long, continuous signal would usually prompt a driver to make an emergency stop. Emergency brake valves are always located on the bulkheads, inside the body of the car next to its end doors. The emergency brake valve is covered by a metal or clear plastic shield labelled "Emergency Only". Sometimes there was also a communicating signal handle on the inside bulkhead, labelled "signal".

Mistakenly identifying the communication cord as the emergency brake can lead to confusion about how emergency braking works on US trains. Once an emergency brake valve is opened, all of the air in the braking system, except those of the locomotive(s), which are equipped with brakes controlled separately (independent brake) from those of the cars, is evacuated, immediately placing the train cars' brakes into emergency, just as if there had been an uncoupling of cars (a "separation"). All available pressure from the Equalizing Reservoir will go into the brake pipe, thus running the length of the train, actuating the train brakes on each car. No action is required (or even possible) on the part of the engineer. The train will stop no matter what they do, and there is no override. Once the train has stopped, the braking system will not recharge (pressurize) until the emergency valve has been closed. This means a member of the train crew must locate the open valve, and ascertain that there is no problem which would make it unsafe to release the brakes and proceed.

Identification of the valve is possible by the sound of air escaping from it. In many cars (and practically all cars built post-WWII), the communicating cord was only located in the vestibule, unless the car was of such a type that it did not have a vestibule, such as a dining or lounge car. In newer Amtrak equipment, the air-operated communicating system was electrified, and operated by pressing a button located in the vestibule. The old communication systems have been gradually supplanted by radios, although they were still required on US passenger equipment until relatively recently. The emergency brake valve continues to be located on the inside bulkhead, or in a consistent (standard) location specified by safety regulations. A member of the train crew must walk the length of the train and inspect it for any damage. The consist will need to be inspected before it can return to normal revenue service.

In the cabs of light-rail cars, the emergency brake is often a large red button, which the train crew refers to as the "mushroom"; this also activates the magnetic track brakes. The mechanism of an emergency brake may differ, depending on railcar design. Emergency-braking a train (without track brakes) will give about 1.5 m/s^{2} (4.9 ft/s^{2}) deceleration. The braking distance will be approximately 250 m (820 ft) at 100 km/h (62 mph) and 600 m (2,000 ft) at 160 km/h (99 mph). High-speed trains are usually equipped with a magnetic track brake, which can give about 0.3 m/s^{2} extra, and give braking distances of about 850 m (2,790 ft) at 200 km/h (120 mph) and 1,900 m (6,200 ft) at 300 km/h (190 mph).

=== United Kingdom ===
Emergency brakes were introduced in the United Kingdom by the Regulation of Railways Act 1868. Section 22 stated, "All trains traveling a distance of more than 20 miles without stopping are to be provided with a means of communication between the passengers and the servants of the company in charge of the train". At first, this means of communication was a cord running down the length of the train at roof level outside the carriages, connected to a bell on the locomotive. When the use of automatic brakes was made compulsory in the Regulation of Railways Act 1889, the equipment was modified so that it operated the brakes; however, the term "communication cord" has survived. Until the 1970s a "cord" (by that time a chain) was still used, which ran the length of the carriage and connected to a valve at one end which opened the brake pipe. The exposed section of chain was painted red, with the coiled section behind the wall painted black. The system was designed so that as the black length of chain was exposed, it would not retract so as to identify which particular chain in that carriage was pulled. A butterfly valve on the side of the carriage was used to reset the brake, and also made it easy for the train crew to see in which coach the cord had been pulled. Later designs used handles which were activated by pulling down; more recent types use buttons connected to a PassComm system. On modern trains with sliding doors the body-indicator light (BIL), usually used to show that doors on a carriage are open, will flash when the brake has been used.

Pulling the alarm chain on a British train will pull a lever connected to the brake pipe flaps. Pulling the alarm activates a piston, causing the flaps to be opened and all the air pushed out the air tube, forcing the brakes on. In the driver's cab, a buzzer and a light will tell that the alarm has been activated. In the guard's van, this is seen from a valve which shows loss of pressure in the brake pipe. In the UK, there is a fine (of level 3 on the standard scale: up to £1000 as of 2018) for pulling the alarm chain without reasonable cause.

==== Override ====
In most rolling stock built since the 1980s, passenger communication handles (or PassComms) have been installed, which activate an alarm in the driver's cab when used. If the train is not in a safe place (in a tunnel or on a bridge, for example) the driver has approximately three seconds to override the alarm by pressing a button before the brakes automatically apply. The driver may also speak to the person who pulled the handle via an intercom mounted alongside the handle. On modern trains this is particularly useful, since the PassComm must be much easier to use and more accessible due to accessibility regulations. However this also makes accidental activation easier. On some modern trains, the PassComm in a disabled-friendly toilet is mounted such that it is often confused with the door or flush control; this sometimes leads to accidental activation. As a result, on some models of train such as the Class 180, the alarm panels fitted in the toilets do not operate the train brake, and simply alert the train crew to the emergency.

==== London Underground ====
When London Underground began converting trains for one-person-operation during the 1970s and 1980s, the original emergency brake systems were replaced by an alarm and a passenger-communication system. On earlier systems the brakes were not applied automatically (being under the control of the driver), whereas later systems have an override as above. On older systems, marker boards showing an exclamation mark were provided on departure from each station at the point where the rear of the train would no longer be at the platform. Normally, if the alarm was activated before the board the driver would stop the train, and otherwise continue to the next station. These boards were replaced by a number of boards counting up the number of cars that are beyond the end of the platform; for example, on a line with six-car trains the boards show 1, 2, 3, 4, 5, 6. When a train has stopped, they help the driver to see how much of the train is at the platform. With the help of passenger communication and available station staff, the driver can then decide whether to deal with the situation as it is, continue to the next station or possibly reverse back into the station (after consulting with line controllers and proper safety measures). During hot summer weather passengers are warned against using the emergency alarms if feeling unwell, since it can delay trains and increase the problem; they are instead instructed to leave the train at the next station and get some fresh air or a cold drink.

=== Russia ===
In Russian trains there is usually an emergency brake known as a "stop valve" (Russian: стоп-кран). In elektrichkas and other trains it is usually located near the doors, and sometimes in the middle of the coach as well. A stop valve usually has a distinctive red handle. Turning the handle down (anti-clockwise) by about 90 degrees causes pneumatic brakes to engage, due to pressure loss in the standard air-braking system. While primitive and not allowing any override such a system is effective, resembling usual train brake activation; it does not fail in emergency conditions. More complicated systems may not provide quick braking when needed, or during a communications failure. Emergency braking is somewhat risky; it is hard on passengers, and there is a risk of passenger injury if braking occurs at high speed. As a result, use of a stop valve without good reason is prohibited and may lead to fines. Depending on circumstances and consequences, authorities may even arrest a person for the incorrect use of a stop valve.

==== Subways ====
In subways, derailment is usually less dangerous (speeds are lower, trains cannot jackknife in tunnels and so on). It is dangerous to stop in a tunnel if a fire develops; an emergency exit could lead to electrocution by the third rail (typically energized with 825 volts DC). Instead drivers try to reach the next station, even in an emergency. As a result, there are no emergency brakes directly visible to passengers. However, there are hidden stop valves and simplified train controls, allowing each coach to act on its own in need. In an emergency, there are door-control handles (visible to passengers) which are intended to make the train doors able to be opened by removing air pressure or disconnecting power. Subway trains have mechanisms and alarms which prevent trains from moving if the doors are open, and alert the driver or engage the brakes if doors open while a train is moving. Penalties for misuse of emergency door-opening handles are similar to those for stop-valve misuse.

=== Japan ===
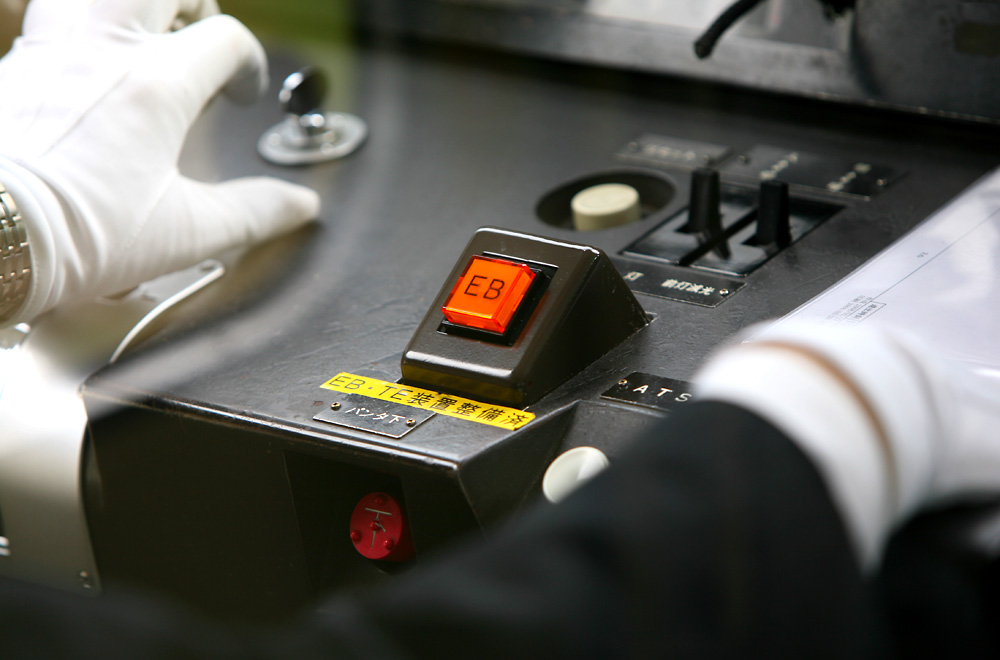
An EB reset switch in a JR West 221 series EMU

In many Japanese passenger and freight trains, an EB reset switch is provided which is activated by sounding a buzzer and lighting up the EB reset switch when the driver does not operate the controls within 60 seconds of last operation (30 seconds on Aonami Line, 40 seconds on JR Kyushu lines). If the EB switch is not pressed (reset) within 5 seconds of being activated, it will trigger an emergency brake application so as to prevent accidents due to driver error or when the driver is incapacitated. Also, a red button and/or an emergency brake setting on the levers are provided in the driver's cab so the driver can manually activate the emergency brake; these can also be activated (like a dead man's handle) when the driver feels unwell or is incapacitated in trains without the EB reset switch. Near train doors, emergency brake cords are available so that passengers can bring the train to a halt in an emergency.

== External signalling ==
In the US, the universally recognized signal to stop is a sweeping, horizontal hand motion, back-and-forth, at arm's length and perpendicular to the track (preferably in a downward direction, so as to distinguish it from a mere greeting). This can be done with an object (such as a light or flag) or an empty hand. In US railroad slang it is referred to as a "washout", or "washing out" signal, or a "signing down", and requires an immediate stop. If the driver's vision is limited, or they feel it necessary, they will make an emergency stop. Drivers are trained to interpret any urgent waving or signalling by a person near the track as a possible warning of danger, perhaps requiring an immediate stop, depending upon the particular circumstances present.

== Images ==
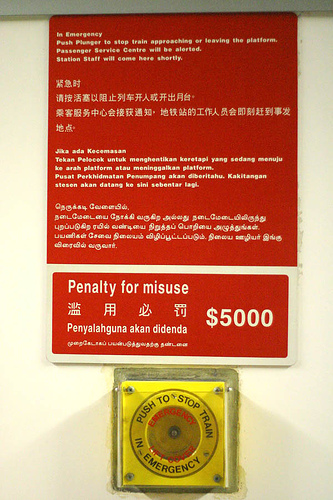
A Mass Rapid Transit emergency plunger in Singapore activated from the station platform. The penalty for misuse is S$5,000.

Old style UK communication cord – not used on newer trains

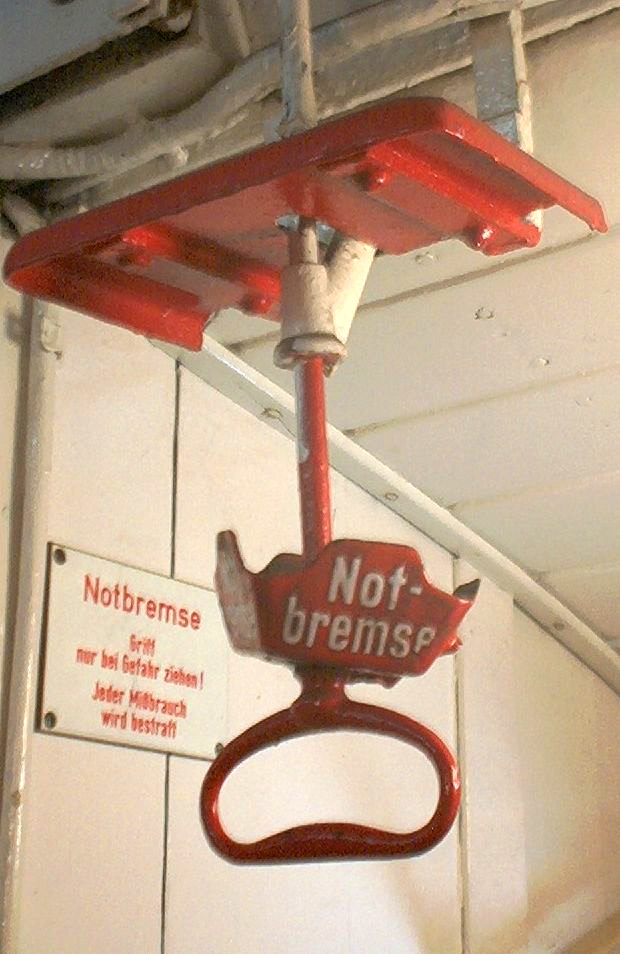
Emergency brake handle on German train (around 1920)

== See also ==
- Air brake (rail)
- Air brake (road vehicle)
- Counterweight brake
- Dead-man's brake
- Dead-man's vigilance device
- Hand brake
- Hydraulic brake
- Pulled tail
- Murder of Deborah Linsley – unsolved murder case on a UK train in which a key witness was criticised for not pulling the emergency cord (brake)
