= 1989 Wentworthville derailment =

1989 derailment in Australia

Coordinates: 33.8075°S 150.9737°E

Details
- Date: 27 December 1989; 11:40 am AEDT
- Location: Wentworthville railway station
- Country: Australia
- Operator: CityRail
- Incident type: Derailment
- Cause: Faulty track maintenance and buckling

Statistics
- Trains: 1
- Deaths: 1
- Injured: 7

The 1989 Wentworthville derailment was a fatal derailment that occurred on the Main Western railway line in Sydney on 27 December 1989. The accident resulted in 1 death and 7 injuries and was the first major incident involving a Tangara set, which had entered service with CityRail the previous year.

== Accident ==
CityRail received complaints of rough riding as a result of railway tracks buckling in the heat near Wentworthville railway station on 26 December. In response, maintenance crews were dispatched to repair a section of track and the bridge over the Cumberland Highway, 300 metres (980 ft) away from the station.

At 11:40 am on 27 December, while repair work remained ongoing, an eight-carriage Tangara T set heading to Emu Plains was approaching Wentworthville station from the east when the track misaligned underneath the train. This caused the rear three carriages to derail. These struck and brought down several stanchions supporting the overhead wires. The rearmost carriage of the train, numbered D6127 rolled onto the ramp at the end of the platform, overturned and was completely destroyed by the impact. Three people on the platform received minor injuries during this sequence.

Four people were trapped inside the wreckage of the train for up to two hours. In the rear carriage, debris from the fallen powerlines pierced through the lower deck, where a 41-year-old Blacktown man suffered severe spinal injuries. He was extracted and transported to Westmead Hospital for treatment but died later the same day.

== Aftermath ==
After the accident, the State Rail Authority launched an inquiry, with CityRail general manager Rob Schwarzer stating that the investigations revealed the cause to be related to the track.

The Tangara was believed to have been travelling at a speed of 95 kilometres per hour (59 mph), below the 115 kilometres per hour (71 mph) speed limit. The investigation raised questions over whether that speed limit should have been lowered in the area given the ongoing track maintenance.

Transport minister Bruce Baird suggested maintenance procedures were the primary cause of the accident.

An independent government investigation and coronial inquiry were also announced following the accident.

== See also ==
- 1998 Concord West derailment – Involved a Tangara under similar circumstances.
- Railway accidents in New South Wales – List of incidents.
