= Chatsworth Hills Academy =

Private school in Chatsworth, California, US

Coordinates: 34.27310°N 118.59904°W

- Chatsworth, California; United States

Information
- Type: Independent, Private, Coeducational
- Motto: Character, Knowledge, and Excellence.
- Established: 1977
- Administration: Ann Gillinger, Head of School; Tim Gerrity, Head of Middle School, Academic Dean; Nancy Salyers, Admission Director; Tom Boulanger, Athletic Director
- Faculty: approximately 32
- Enrollment: approximately 230
- Average class size: 15 students
- Student to teacher ratio: 8.5:1
- Colors: Blue and Gold
- Mascot: CHA Golden Eagles
- Website: chaschool.org

Chatsworth Hills Academy (CHA) is a private, coeducational day school located in Chatsworth, California, United States. CHA students are enrolled in Grades K through Eight and Preschool.

CHA is accredited by the California Association of Independent Schools (CAIS) and the Western Association of Schools and Colleges (WASC). CHA is a member of National Association of Independent Schools (NAIS).

== History ==
Chatsworth Hills Academy was founded in 1977 by a group of public school parents led by Liz Stillwell Shapiro. Following a co-op model, parents volunteered their time in their areas of expertise to clear the land, pour concrete, install buildings, run wiring, develop curriculum, buy books, and hire instructors. The Chatsworth campus opened in the fall of 1978 with grades 4-8, and a second site in Van Nuys held grades 1-3. The school was originally named the Neighborhood School and organized as a non-profit, public benefit corporation.

In 1980, the Van Nuys location was closed, and students in grades 1-3 were moved to the Chatsworth campus and the ninth grade was added.

In 1981, the name of the school was changed to Chatsworth Hills Academy. Towards the end of the '80s, enrollment at the middle school level decreased, grades 7-9 were eliminated, and Chatsworth Hills Academy became Preschool through grade 6 from 1988-1996. By 1998, middle school enrollment had grown again and grades 7 and 8 were returned permanently to the School. CHA started a summer camp for students Preschool through 8th grade was started in June 2000.

Chatsworth Hills Academy has evolved over the years and is no longer a "parent-run" co-op school. The Board of Trustees is composed of fourteen individuals, mostly current and former school parents. The Board is responsible, with the Head of School, to strategically plan for the future of Chatsworth Hills Academy.

== Athletic Program ==
Chatsworth Hills Academy participates in a full range of interscholastic athletics as a member of the San Fernando Valley Private School League (SFVPSL). Beginning in fourth grade, boys' teams include Flag Football, Basketball, Soccer and/or Volleyball during the school year. Girls have the opportunity to compete in soccer, basketball, and volleyball. Team practices take place during school hours and after school. Games are played both home and away. Over the past several years, many CHA school teams have made play-off berths and have won league championships. CHA teams have won sixteen SFVPSL titles.

CHA coaches support the school's character education program by modeling and developing within each student character, teamwork, participation and sportsmanship. The athletic philosophy seeks to have all the CHA teams succeed yet premise the sports program on the belief that every member of the team must play.

== Campus Facts ==
Chatsworth is an inland part of the coastal region of southern California that was the historic homeland of the Chumash Indians. CHA is believed to be located on land once used by Chumash Indians for villages, campgrounds and/or burial sites. There was at least one large, ancient Chumash village located at the foot of nearby Santa Susana Pass. The area is now known as the Chatsworth Cairn Site. The site was used for ceremonial purposes. A short distance from the Chatsworth Cairn Site, the Chumash established numerous settlements over extended periods of time. Regularly flowing water supported these settlements.

CHA's campus has several rock formations containing Chumash pictographs. CHA also has a natural sulphur spring that surfaces on its lower campus. It is thought that the sulphur spring attracted Chumash and other Native American tribes to the area. According to one source, "a local sulfur spring percolated to the surface with water that was considered to contain important medicinal qualities. People from all of the neighboring villages, Chumash or Tongva were welcome to partake in the healing powers of these waters."
