= List of Wabash College people =

This page lists notable alumni and former students, faculty, and administrators of Wabash College.

== Alumni ==
=== Academia ===
- George J. Graham, Jr., political theorist
- John S. Hougham, natural scientist and president, Purdue University, 1876
- William Parker McKee, president, Shimer College
- Stephen G. Miller, archaeologist
- Tom Ostrom, social psychologist
- Stephen H. Webb, theologian and philosopher of religion
- Robert Wedgeworth, founding president of ProLiteracy Worldwide

=== Business ===
- Robert Allen, former AT&T CEO
- David Broecker (born 1961), CEO of Alkermes and Indiana Biosciences Research Institute
- James Bert Garner, head of the Chemistry Department, 1901–14; inventor of the gas mask used in World War I
- Brad Gerstner, founder of Altimeter Capital
- Doug Petno, JP Morgan Chase Co-President and CEO of the Commercial & Investment Bank
- W. Paul Tippett Jr., former president of American Motors, Springs Industries, and STP

=== Law ===
- Edward Daniels, co-founder of Baker & Daniels (now Faegre Drinker Biddle & Reath)
- David E. Kendall, President Bill Clinton's attorney, known for a number of anti-death penalty cases

=== Media and the arts ===
- Richard Elwell (R.E.) Banta, writer, rare book dealer, publisher and humorist
- Eric Daman, Emmy-winning costumer and fashion designer
- Silky Nutmeg Ganache, drag queen and competitor on RuPaul's Drag Race season 11 and All Stars
- Dean Jagger, Oscar-winning motion picture actor
- Kenyon Nicholson, Broadway playwright, screenwriter
- Byron Price, winner of a Pulitzer Prize in Journalism (1944), director of the Office of Censorship
- Frank Reynolds, ABC World News Tonight anchor
- Lawrence Sanders, novelist
- Allen Saunders, cartoonist
- Dan Simmons, science fiction author, dedicated his novel Ilium to the college
- Lee Orean Smith (1874–1942), composer, arranger, music editor, publisher, music teacher, multi-instrumentalist, and conductor
- Sheldon Vanauken, author, confidante of C. S. Lewis

=== Medicine ===
- Robert G. Roeder, Arnold and Mabel Beckman Professor, head of the Laboratory of Biochemical and Molecular Biology at the Rockefeller University
- Emery Andrew Rovenstine, co-founder of the American Society of Anesthesiologists
- Frank Sellke, cardiothoracic surgeon, academic, and researcher

=== Military ===
- Major General Edward Canby, only United States general killed during the Indian Wars
- Major General Oscar R. Cauldwell, Marine Corps officer during World War II
- Brigadier General John Coburn, Civil War officer; accepted the surrender of Atlanta
- General Charles Cruft, Civil War officer
- Brigadier General Speed S. Fry, Civil War officer
- Lt. Gen. Charles D. Herron, United States Army
- Major General Lew Wallace, Civil War officer, statesman, and author of Ben-Hur

=== Politics ===
- Jeremy Bird, national field organizer for Barack Obama's 2012 Campaign
- John C. Black, US representative and Medal of Honor recipient
- Mike Braun, governor of Indiana; United States senator; former Indiana state representative, District 63
- Kevin P. Chavous, Council of the District of Columbia representative
- John Coburn, United States representative from Indiana, Civil War brigadier general
- Hiram Orlando Fairchild, speaker of the Wisconsin State Assembly
- Cleon H. Foust, Indiana attorney general
- Stephen Goldsmith, mayor of Indianapolis, deputy mayor of New York City
- Dwight Green, governor of Illinois and Capone prosecutor
- Andrew Hamilton, United States representative
- Bayless W. Hanna, Indiana attorney general, United States Ambassador to Iran and United States Ambassador to Argentina
- Will Hays, postmaster general and film censor czar
- Randall Head, Indiana state senator, District 18
- William A. Ketcham, Indiana attorney general, commander-in-chief of the Grand Army of the Republic
- Thomas Riley Marshall, twenty-eighth vice president of the United States (under Woodrow Wilson)
- Joseph E. McDonald, United States representative and senator
- Reginald Meeks, Kentucky State representative
- Luke Messer, United States representative
- Thomas MacDonald Patterson, United States representative and senator
- William Pittenger, United States representative
- John Pope, Chicago alderman (10th ward)
- Todd Rokita, United States representative, 44th attorney general of Indiana
- Richard J. Stephenson, financier of conservative causes
- Reginald H. Sullivan, mayor of Indianapolis
- Brent Waltz, Indiana state senator, District 36
- Charles P. White, Indiana secretary of state
- Raymond E. Willis, United States senator
- Henry Lane Wilson, United States ambassador to Mexico
- James Wilson, United States representative from Indiana
- John L. Wilson, United States representative and senator
- William Allen Woods, federal judge and justice of the Indiana Supreme Court

=== Science ===
- Geoffrey W. Coates, polymer chemist
- Robert Dirks, computational chemist

=== Sports ===
- Knute Cauldwell, NFL player
- Bert Inks, coached the Wabash College Presbyterians in 1905
- Ward Lambert, college basketball coach
- Don Leppert, Major League Baseball player, homered in first at-bat, first position player All-Star in Washington-Texas franchise history
- Ward Meese, National Football League player
- Pete Metzelaars, National Football League all-time leader in games played by a tight end and four-time AFC champion
- Century Milstead, college football Hall of Famer
- William H. Spaulding, football head coach, University of Minnesota and UCLA
- Ed Summers, Major League Baseball player, pitched in Games 1 and 4 of 1908 World Series

== Faculty ==
- Andrea Chapdelaine, faculty 1993–1995; in 2024, became president of Connecticut College
- Garfield V. Cox, established the college's Department of Public Speaking in 1917
- Jeremy Hartnett, Anne and Andrew T. Ford Professor of the Liberal Arts
- William Placher, postliberal theologian, LaFollette Distinguished Professor in the Humanities
- Ezra Pound (1885–1972), poet and critic; appointed chair of the Department of Romance Languages for the 1907–1908 academic year, but left in February after alleged sexual impropriety
- Benjamin Rogge, economist; taught at Wabash 1949–1980; dean of the college 1955–1964
