= Ibri (disambiguation) =

Ibri or Ibris may refer to:

- Ibri, a city in Oman
- Ibar, a river in Kosovo, Montenegro and Serbia, known as Ibri among Albanians
- Ibrict, a college located in Ibri, Oman
- Eyebroughy, also known as Ibris, an islet in Scotland
- IBRI, or Indiana Biosciences Research Institute
