= Broecker =

Broecker Bröcker or Brocker may refer to:

- David Broecker (born 1961), American life sciences executive
- Tom Broecker, American actor and costume designer
- Wallace Smith Broecker (1931–2019), American earth scientist
- Patricia Brocker (born 1966), German football player

== See also ==
- Broeckers
