= Robert Dirks =

American computational chemist killed in 2015 train wreck

- Dirks from a 2014 family portrait
- Born: May 29, 1978; Bangkok, Thailand
- Died: February 3, 2015 (aged 36); Valhalla, New York, U.S.
- Education: Wabash College, A.B., 2000; Caltech, Ph.D., 2005
- Spouse: Christine Ueda
- Children: 2
- Scientific career
- Fields: Computational chemistry, DNA nanotechnology
- Institutions: Caltech, D. E. Shaw Research
- Thesis: Analysis, design, and construction of nucleic acid devices (2005)
- Academic advisors: Niles Pierce

Robert Dirks (May 29, 1978 – February 3, 2015) was an American chemist known for his theoretical and experimental work in DNA nanotechnology. Born in Thailand to a Thai Chinese mother and American father, he moved to Spokane, Washington at a young age. Dirks was the first graduate student in Niles Pierce's research group at the California Institute of Technology, where his dissertation work was on algorithms and computational tools to analyze nucleic acid thermodynamics and predict their structure. He also performed experimental work developing a biochemical chain reaction to self-assemble nucleic acid devices. Dirks later worked at D. E. Shaw Research on algorithms for protein folding that could be used to design new pharmaceuticals.

In February 2015, Dirks died in the Valhalla train crash, the deadliest accident in the history of Metro-North Railroad. An award for early-career achievement in molecular programming research was established in his honor.

== Early life ==
Dirks was born in Bangkok, Thailand, in 1978. His mother Suree, a Thai Chinese woman who worked in a bank at the time, his father, Michael Dirks, was a mathematics teacher at the International School Bangkok recruited from the United States. After about a year, the family, including older brother William, moved back to Vancouver, British Columbia, Canada so that his father could pursue doctoral studies in mathematics education at the University of British Columbia. Four years later the family settled in Michael's hometown of Spokane, Washington, where he took a job teaching math at North Central High School and Spokane Falls Community College.

Robert attended Lewis and Clark High School, where he excelled academically, entering and winning many math competitions. He was selected to do cardiovascular research at the University of Washington over the summer before his senior year. During that year, he received the top score of 5 on every Advanced Placement exam he took, and was chosen as class valedictorian in 1996. Shortly after graduation Robert and three of his classmates were one of three high school winners of the ExploraVision national scientific contest, earning them and their families a trip to Washington, D.C. The topic of their project was the future of nanotechnology.

Although he had been accepted to the Massachusetts Institute of Technology, he chose instead to attend Wabash College in Crawfordsville, Indiana. He graduated summa cum laude and with Phi Beta Kappa honors, from Wabash in 2000 with a double major in chemistry and math. He also did a two minors in biology and music, playing the bassoon, clarinet and piano.

He then began graduate studies in chemistry at the California Institute of Technology in Pasadena, California. He received his Ph.D. in 2005 and remained at Caltech for a postdoctoral fellowship. During his years there he met Christine Ueda, another doctoral student who became his wife.

== Research ==
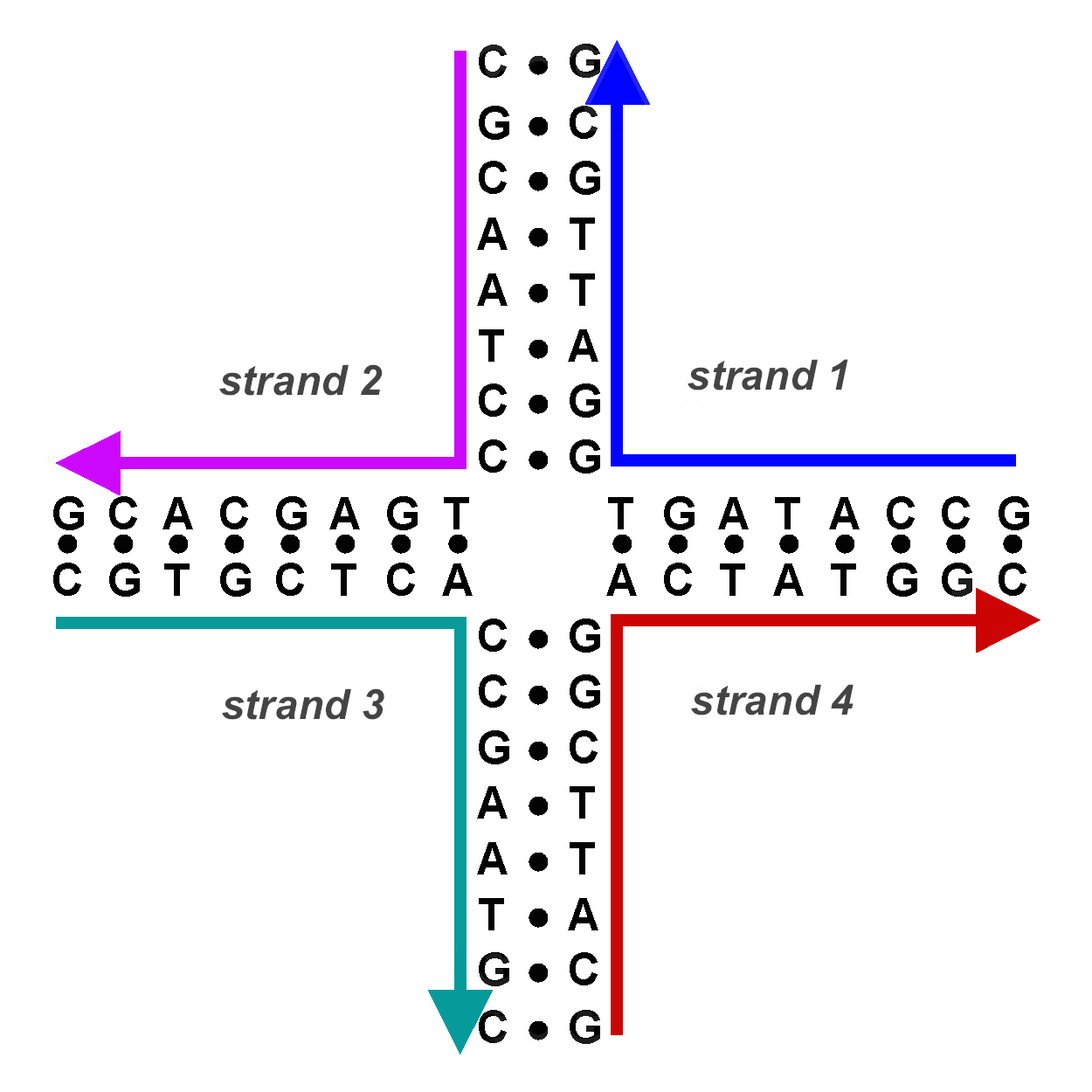
Dirks developed algorithms and computational tools for predicting the structure and thermodynamics of certain classes of nucleic acid structures: those containing multiple strands (top) and pseudoknots (bottom).

Dirks was the first graduate student in the laboratory of Niles Pierce at Caltech. His dissertation was entitled "Analysis, design, and construction of nucleic acid devices".

Dirks' work in computational chemistry involved creating algorithms and computational tools for the analysis of nucleic acid thermodynamics and nucleic acid structure prediction. Dirks wrote the initial code for the NUPACK suite of nucleic acid design and analysis tools, which generates base pairing probabilities through calculation of the statistical partition function. Unlike other structure prediction tools, NUPACK is capable of handling an arbitrary number of interacting strands rather than being limited to one or two. Dirks also developed an algorithm capable of efficiently handling certain types of pseudoknots, a class of structure that is more computationally intensive to analyze, although NUPACK only implements this ability for single RNA strands.

His experimental work pioneered the hybridization chain reaction method, the first demonstration of the self-assembly of nucleic acid structures conditional on a molecular input. The method arose from attempts to use DNA hairpins as "fuel" for DNA machines, but Dirks and Pierce realized that they could instead be used for signal amplification, and when used in conjunction with an aptamer, as a biosensor. As an enzyme-free, isothermal method, it later found application as the basis of an immunoassay method, for in situ hybridization imaging of gene expression, and as the basis for catalytic, isothermal self-assembly of DNA nanostructures.

Dirks then worked at D. E. Shaw Research in Manhattan to develop methods for computational protein structure prediction for the design of new drugs, beginning in 2006.

== Later life and death ==
Dirks and Ueda married in 2007. She initially also worked at D. E. Shaw Research, but stopped in 2010 to raise the first of two children. The couple settled in the Westchester County suburb of Chappaqua, New York. He rose early to commute to his job via Metro-North Railroad's Harlem Line, and returned late but devoted as much time as possible on evenings and weekends to his children.

On February 3, 2015, Dirks died in the Valhalla train crash. He was riding home in the front car of his train, which his brother says he likely did to take advantage of the quieter atmosphere, when it struck an SUV at a grade crossing north of Valhalla, 5 miles (8.0 km) south of the Chappaqua station. The train dragged the SUV while it came to a stop, loosening segments of the third rail that accumulated in the front car. Dirks, the SUV driver, and four other passengers were killed, making it the deadliest accident in Metro-North's history.

Reactions to his death came from many quarters, many paying tribute to his scientific prowess. His father recalled that "he always got everything the first time. He always excelled." Greg Sampson, Dirks' math teacher at Lewis and Clark, remembered when his student had finished an advanced class in trigonometry in just two weeks, something no other student of his has ever done, saying "he was just an amazing, amazing student." Niles Pierce recalled how Dirks was willing to take a chance on working with a younger professor. His former postdoc was, he said, "an unusual student, even for Caltech... He did remarkable things." D. E. Shaw Research, his employer, called him "a brilliant scientist who made tremendous contributions to our own research, and to the broader scientific community."

In April 2015, the International Society for Nanoscale Science, Computation, and Engineering (ISNCSE), the main scientific society for DNA nanotechnology and DNA computing, established the Robert Dirks Molecular Programming Prize to recognize early-career scientists for molecular programming research. The first prize was awarded in 2016. As of June 2016, fundraising to establish a $100,000 endowment was ongoing.

== Notable works ==
- Dirks, R. M.; Pierce, N. A. (2003). "A partition function algorithm for nucleic acid secondary structure including pseudoknots" (PDF). Journal of Computational Chemistry. 24 (13): 1664–1677. doi:10.1002/jcc.10296. PMID 12926009. S2CID 323817.
- Dirks, R. M.; Pierce, N. A. (2004). "Triggered amplification by hybridization chain reaction". Proceedings of the National Academy of Sciences. 101 (43): 15275–15278. Bibcode:2004PNAS..10115275D. doi:10.1073/pnas.0407024101. PMC 524468. PMID 15492210.
- Dirks, R. M.; Bois, J. S.; Schaeffer, J. M.; Winfree, E.; Pierce, N. A. (2007). "Thermodynamic Analysis of Interacting Nucleic Acid Strands". SIAM Review. 49 (1): 65–88. Bibcode:2007SIAMR..49...65D. CiteSeerX 10.1.1.523.4764. doi:10.1137/060651100.
- Piana, S.; Lindorff-Larsen, K.; Dirks, R. M.; Salmon, J. K.; Dror, R. O.; Shaw, D. E. (2012). "Evaluating the Effects of Cutoffs and Treatment of Long-range Electrostatics in Protein Folding Simulations". PLOS ONE. 7 (6) e39918. Bibcode:2012PLoSO...739918P. doi:10.1371/journal.pone.0039918. PMC 3386949. PMID 22768169.

== See also ==
- List of computational chemists
- List of people from Spokane, Washington
- List of Wabash College people
- List of California Institute of Technology people
