= John C. Lechleiter =

American businessman and chemist

- Born: 1952
- Education: Pharmacology
- Alma mater: Xavier University (B.S.); Harvard University (Ph.D.)
- Occupations: Businessman and chemist
- Employer: Eli Lilly and Company
- Known for: former president, Eli Lilly and Company
- Title: President and chief operating officer

John C. Lechleiter (born 1952) is an American businessman and chemist. He served as president, chief executive officer, and chairman of the board of directors of Eli Lilly and Company from April 2008 to December 2016.

== Early life and education ==
Lechleiter first participated in laboratory research in a summer research program at the University of Minnesota in 1974. Lechleiter received a Bachelor of Science in Chemistry from Xavier University in 1975. He went on to receive a master's degree and a PhD in organic chemistry from Harvard University in 1980 after studying on a National Science Foundation Fellowship. His thesis advisor was Dr. Paul A. Wender.

== Career ==
=== Eli Lilly and Company ===
Lechleiter joined Eli Lilly and Company in 1979 as senior organic chemist. From 1984 to 1986, he served as director of pharmaceutical product development at the Lilly Research Centre Limited in Windlesham, England.

In 1986, he returned to the U.S. as manager of research and development projects for Europe. He became Director of development projects management in 1988, Executive Director of pharmaceutical product development in 1991, Vice President of pharmaceutical product development in 1993, and Vice President of regulatory affairs in 1994. Lechleiter became Vice President for development and regulatory affairs in 1996, and Senior Vice President of pharmaceutical products in 1998. In 2001, he was appointed executive vice president for pharmaceutical products and corporate development. In a 2003 e-mail, he discussed the use of the anti-schizophrenia or bipolar disorder drug Zyprexa for "disruptive kids", an off-label use, for which drug manufacturers are not legally permitted to encourage, even if it was not approved by federal regulators because it could lead to diabetes. "The fact we are now talking to child psychs and peds and others about Strattera means that we must seize the opportunity to expand our work with Zyprexa in this same child-adolescent population." In 2004, he became Executive Vice President for pharmaceutical operations.

Lechleiter served as Lilly's president and chief operating officer beginning in October 2005. He also joined Lilly's board of directors at that time. Lechleiter was elected as Lilly’s president and chief executive officer (CEO), effective April 1, 2008. Effective January 1, 2009, Lechleiter was appointed as chairman of the company's board of directors, succeeding Sidney Taurel.

In 2012, he earned US$15.57 million, according to Forbes. He is credited with successfully guiding the company through a difficult period in which patent protection expired for four of its main products, Gemzar, Zyprexa, Cymbalta and Evista, and for establishing a promising pipeline of possible new drugs. In 2013, he said his advice to others was "...move quickly, but the most important thing is to be patient, resolute, and be guided by the data."

=== Board and organizational memberships ===
Lechleiter is a member of the American Chemical Society, the Business Roundtable and The Business Council. He is Chairman of the Pharmaceutical Research and Manufacturers of America and President of the International Federation of Pharmaceutical Manufacturers & Associations. Lechleiter is on the Boards of Directors of Nike, Inc. (from 2009), the Central Indiana Corporate Partnership and the Great Lakes Chemical Corporation.

He has served on the Board of Trustees of his alma mater, Xavier University, for a three-year term beginning in September 2004, and on the board of the Life Sciences Foundation. He serves as a distinguished advisor to the Children's Museum of Indianapolis.

In 2014, he became chairman of United Way Worldwide, which Lilly has supported for many years through both corporate giving and volunteerism. Lilly employees are encouraged to participate in the Lilly Global Day of Service, an internationally observed day of charitable work in their communities. Lechleiter began the initiative in 2008, the year that he became CEO. Lechleiter has identified poor K-12 and STEM education as "this country's Achilles' heel", and the Lechleiter family has contributed towards K-12 education via the Catholic Education Foundation of Louisville.

== Awards and honors ==
External videos
- Leadership Along the Path We Have Chosen, John Lechleiter, Voices in Leadership, March 31, 2015, Harvard University
- Eli Lilly CEO John Lechleiter: ‘Engage People Like Never Before’, 2012, DiversityInc
- CNBC interview with John Lechleiter, CEO and Chairman of Eli Lilly, 2010, Committee Encouraging Corporate Philanthropy

He has received Honorary Doctorates from Marian University (2006), the University of Indianapolis (2012), and the National University of Ireland (2012).

In 2012, he was awarded the inaugural Global Health Partner Award from Project HOPE.

In 2014, he was named as the August M. Watanabe Life Sciences Champion of the Year for his work in supporting the development of the Indiana Biosciences Research Institute.

In 2015, he received the International Citizen of the Year Award from the International Center of Indianapolis.

== Personal life ==
Lechleiter and his wife Sarah live in Indianapolis, Indiana, and have three children and several grandchildren.
