= Broeckers =

Broeckers, Bröckers, or Brockers is a surname. Notable people with the surname include:

- Mathias Bröckers (born 1954), German journalist and author
- Michael Brockers (born 1990), American football player

== See also ==
- Broecker
