= Valhalla train crash =

2015 disaster in New York

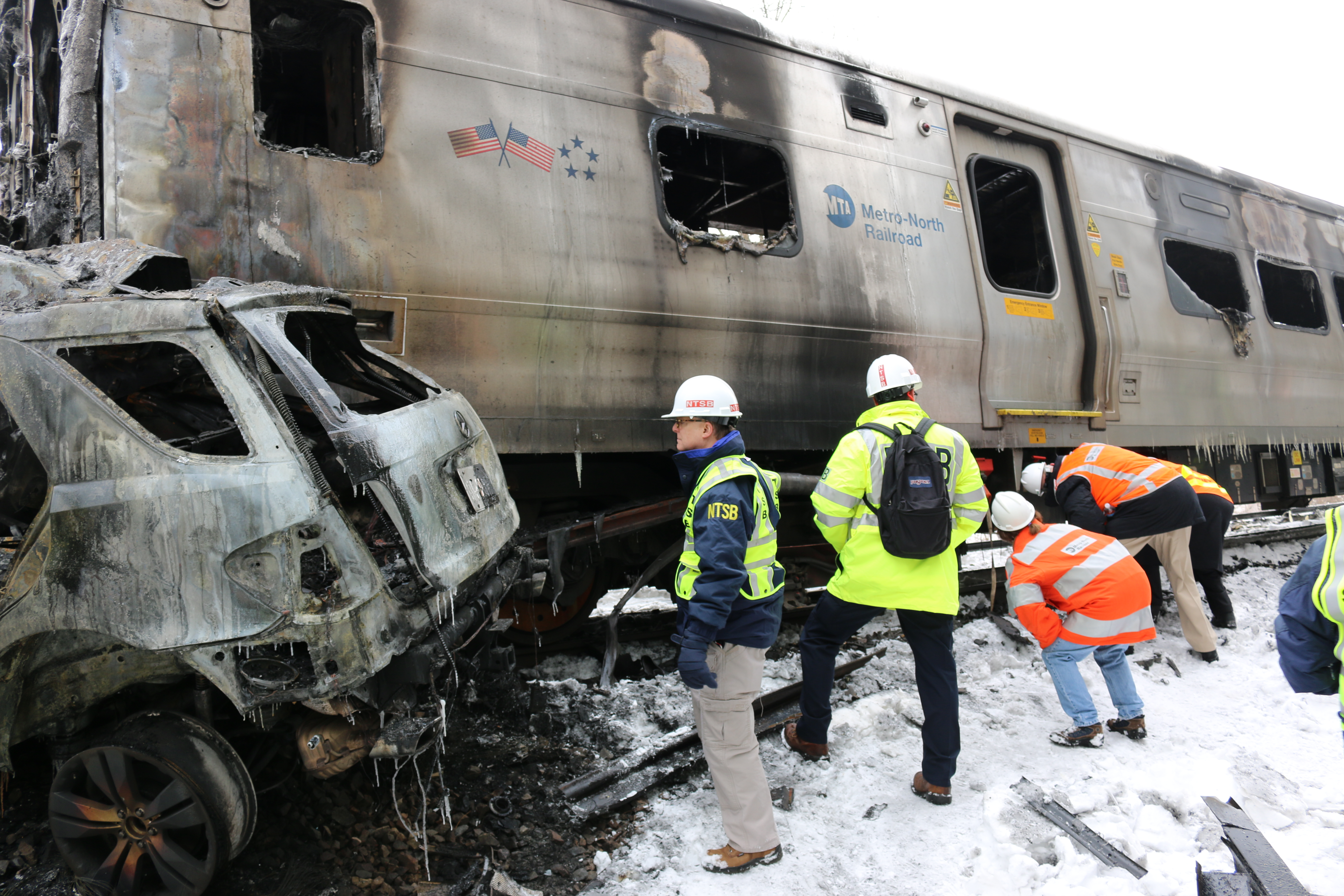
- NTSB investigators survey the vehicles involved in the accident

Details
- Date: February 3, 2015; 11 years ago 6:26 p.m. EST (23:26 UTC)
- Location: Valhalla, New York
- Coordinates: 41°05′11″N 73°47′17″W
- Country: United States
- Line: Harlem Line
- Operator: Metro-North Railroad
- Incident type: Grade crossing collision
- Cause: Obstruction of line (smash into the automobile at a railroad crossing)

Statistics
- Trains: 1 (Metro North commuter train)
- Vehicles: 1 (a black SUV)
- Passengers: At least 650
- Deaths: 6
- Injured: 15
- Damage: 1 train car destroyed 1 train car damaged 1 automobile $3.7 million

On the evening of February 3, 2015, a commuter train on Metro-North Railroad's Harlem Line struck a passenger car at a grade crossing on Commerce Street near Valhalla, New York, United States. Six people were killed and 15 others injured, seven severely. It is the deadliest crash in Metro-North's history, and was at the time the deadliest rail accident in the United States since the June 2009 Washington Metro train collision, which killed nine passengers and injured 80. (Note: A little more than three months later it was overtaken by the Amtrak train derailment in Philadelphia, which equaled the 2009 accident with eight fatalities.)

The crash occurred following a car accident on the adjacent Taconic State Parkway that caused traffic to be detoured onto local roads; the parkway had been closed in one direction. A sport utility vehicle (SUV) driven by Ellen Brody of nearby Edgemont was waiting at the grade crossing. It was caught between the crossing's gates when they descended onto the rear of the SUV as the train approached from the south. Instead of backing into the space another driver had created for her, Brody drove forward onto the tracks. She died when the train struck her vehicle and pushed it down the tracks. The collision damaged over 450 feet (140 m) of the third rail, which led to a fire and the deaths of five passengers.

Investigators from the National Transportation Safety Board (NTSB) focused on two issues in the accident: how the train passengers were killed, and why Brody went forward into the train's path. The board's 2017 final report determined the driver of the SUV to be the cause of the accident, after finding no defects with the vehicle or crossing equipment, or issues with the train engineer's performance. While it ruled out proposed explanations for Brody's behavior such as the placement of the SUV's gear shift lever, it could not offer any of its own. Despite the report's findings, lawsuits were filed against the town of Mount Pleasant, which maintains Commerce Street; Westchester County, the railroad; and the engineer. In 2024, a jury found the railroad and Brody liable for the accident.

== Background ==
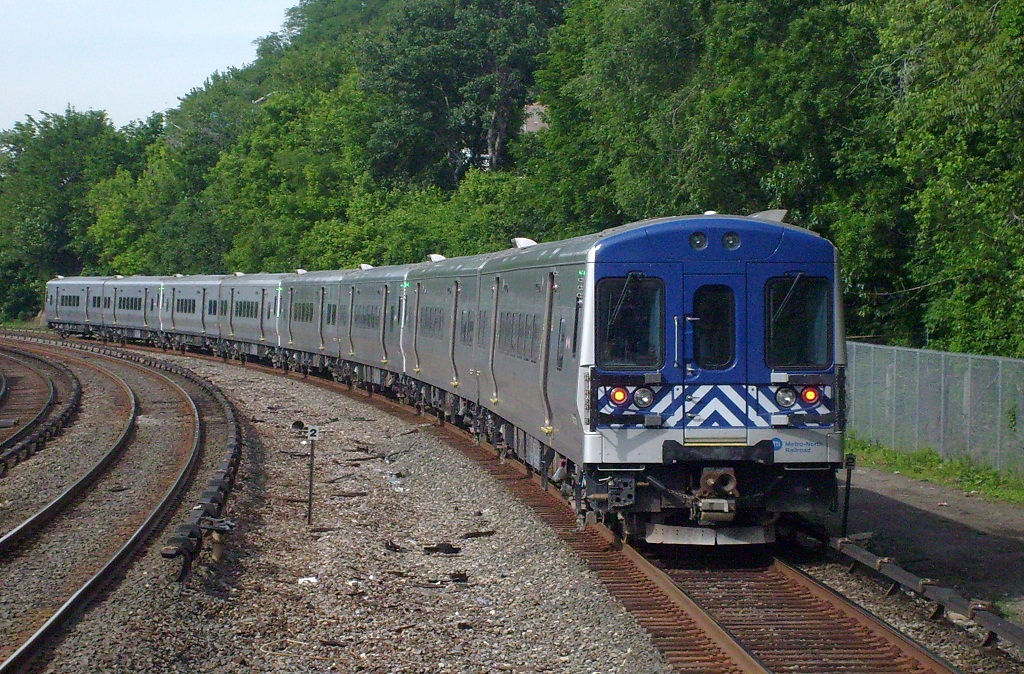
M7A electric multiple units, similar to those forming the No. 659 train

At about 5:30 p.m., 14 minutes after sunset on February 3, 2015, a vehicle traveling south along the Taconic State Parkway north of Valhalla, New York, in central Westchester County north of New York City, struck another vehicle making a turn onto Lakeview Avenue from the northbound parkway. Responding emergency services closed both southbound lanes and one northbound lane of the Taconic, where the highway closely parallels the two tracks of Metro-North Railroad's Harlem Line on its west. Drivers heading in both directions left the parkway, seeking alternate routes back to it on local surface roads.

Traffic detoured onto Lakeview Avenue, which crosses the tracks at grade, and turned into the large Kensico Cemetery, a short distance to the west. The next grade crossing is Commerce Street, a lightly traveled local road to the north that intersects the tracks diagonally. It continues northwest through the cemetery for one-quarter mile (400 m), then turns north again down a slight rise back over another grade crossing to a signal-controlled intersection with the parkway. After a crash at the Commerce Street crossing in 1984 that killed the driver of the van involved, a crossing gate had been installed.

Almost 15 minutes after the accident, at 5:44, Metro-North train No. 659 departed Grand Central Terminal in Manhattan (GCT), 26 miles (42 km) south of Valhalla. It was an express train of eight cars, formed by four paired electric multiple units (EMUs)—all M7As made by Bombardier. The train was bound for the Southeast station, (Note: That segment is electrified by third rail.) with Chappaqua its first scheduled stop. At the controls was Stephen Smalls, 32, a three-year Metro-North employee who had been an engineer for nine months.

== Crash ==
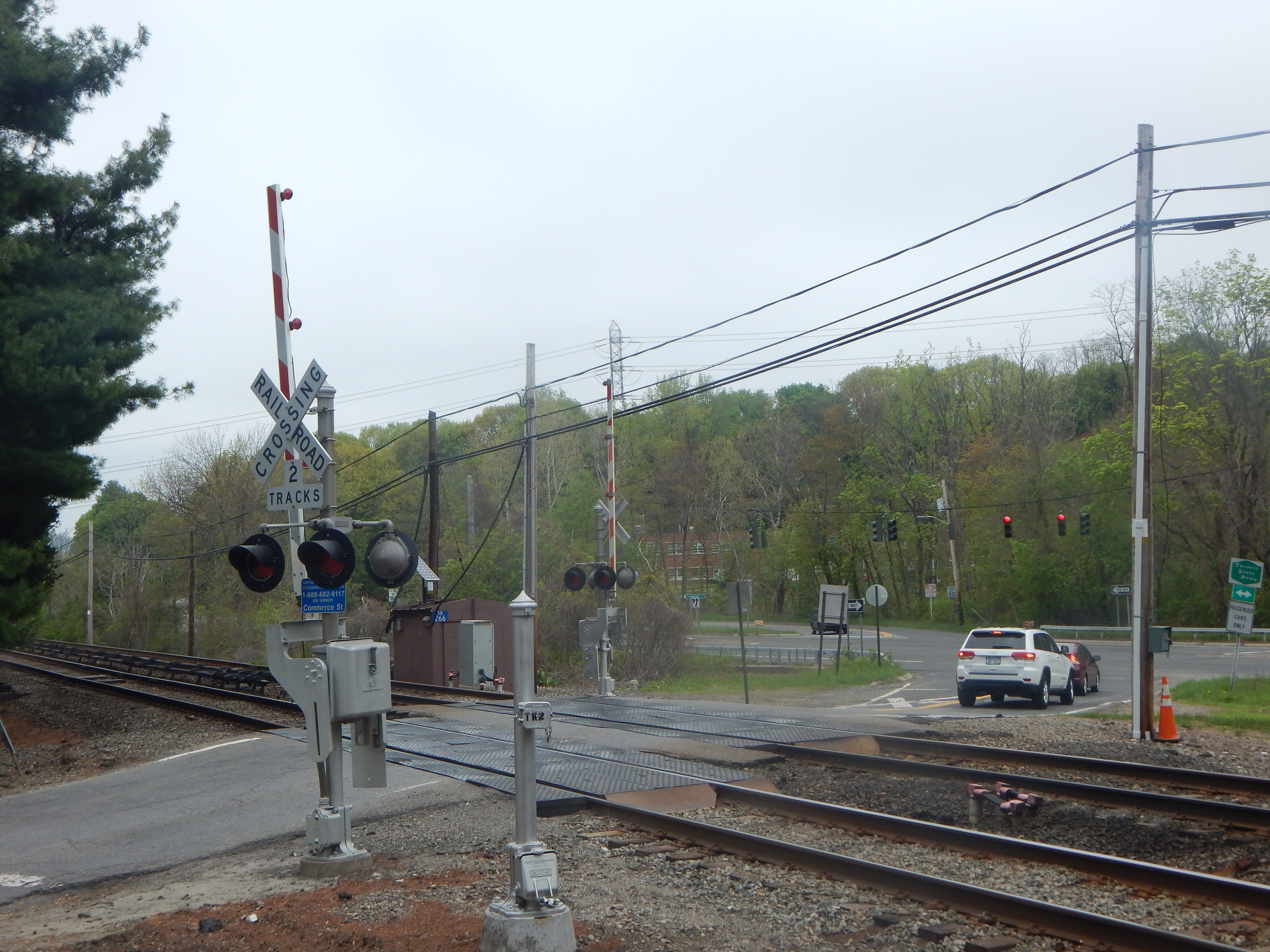
The Commerce Street crossing in Valhalla where the wreck occurred, three months later, seen from its southwest

At 6 p.m. Ellen Schaeffer Brody, 49, of Edgemont, finished her shift at a jewelry store in downtown Chappaqua. She drove her 2011 Mercedes-Benz ML350 SUV south in order to meet a potential client for her bookkeeping business in Scarsdale. Before leaving work, she had texted the client she was running late. This delay required her to deviate from her usual route home into an area she did not know well.

Alan Brody called his wife at 6:11. During the call he gave her directions to Scarsdale, telling her to get off the Saw Mill River Parkway—her usual route south from Chappaqua—at the exit with the Taconic and follow it to the Bronx River Parkway. It could not be determined if she had the phone on speaker, which would have allowed her to keep both hands on the wheel. But according to Alan, the ML350 was equipped with software that automatically detected the phone if it was in the vehicle and put it on speaker. Alan did not believe she was familiar with both the area she was driving through, or with grade crossings. (Note: In 2016, Alan agreed in a newspaper interview that she would have had to have driven over the Lakeview Avenue grade crossing to make the turn up Commerce Street and the accident site.)

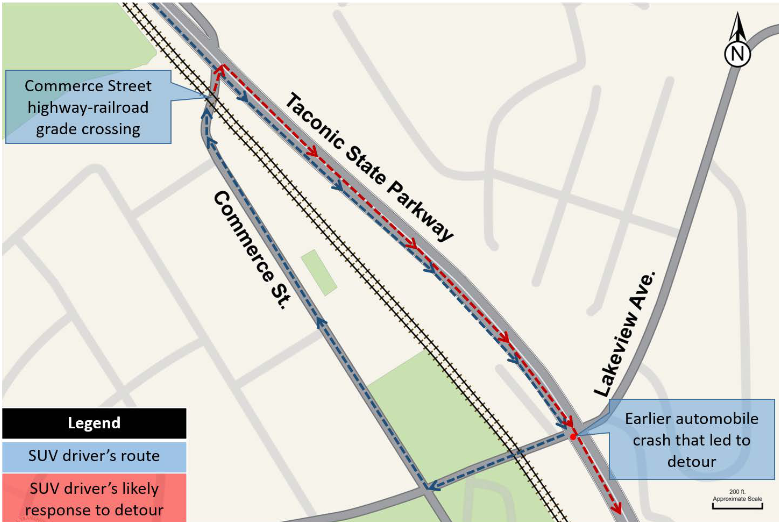
NTSB map of Brody's route to the crash site

The call was dropped at 6:19. Shortly afterwards Ellen apparently reached the site of the road accident at the Lakeview intersection, still closed, and took the detour. The National Transportation Safety Board (NTSB) later theorized she was hoping the accident would have been cleared enough to allow her to return to the southbound Taconic. She turned west, then north up Commerce Street, towards the intersection she had previously passed. Behind her was a vehicle driven by Rick Hope of Yorktown Heights, returning from his job in White Plains. He told the investigators that traffic was stop-and-go on Lakeview and Commerce. Both Hope and Brody stopped for a few seconds at the grade crossing.

At the grade crossing, train 659 was approaching on the western track. The crossing gates descended, warning lights began flashing and, according to Hope, bells began ringing. (Note: The crossing did not have bells (they are only required when pedestrian crossing facilities are present).) Hope said Brody's SUV was in front of the gate as it descended, but not on the tracks. The crossing gate struck the top of Brody's SUV before sliding down its rear and becoming stuck. Hope backed up to give her room to do the same. He instead saw Brody get out of the SUV and walk to the rear, apparently trying to free it. "She wasn't in a hurry at all, but she had to have known that a train was coming," he said.

Smalls, at the head of the train, told investigators he first noticed something reflecting light from within the crossing when it was 1,200 feet (370 m) ahead. He realized it was from a vehicle fouling the tracks, and immediately hit the emergency brakes and sounded the horn, earlier than he would have had the tracks been clear. Smalls hoped that the vehicle would hear it and leave since he knew he could not stop the train in time.

=== Collision ===
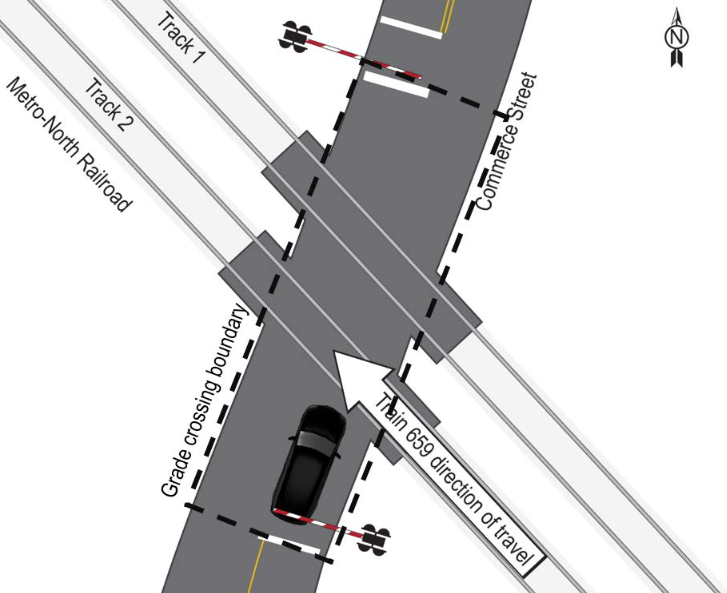
NTSB map of crash site

Brody then returned to her vehicle and, according to Hope, paused briefly. Then it moved forward, 30 seconds after the gate had come down on it. In the cab, Smalls saw the ML350 completely block the tracks when the train was one of its car lengths, or approximately 85 feet (26 m), away, and braced for impact. The train, traveling at 51 miles per hour (82 km/h), struck the SUV on its passenger side at 6:26 p.m.

"There was a terrible crunching sound, and just like that, the car was gone," Hope said. "Disappeared. It happened instantly. There's no way she could have known what hit her."

Passengers in the train's first car recalled being thrown from their seats on impact as a fire started. One said that moments after being thrown into the next seat, he saw a section of the third rail go through the seat he had just been in. Efforts by passengers in the car behind them to assist them were unsuccessful as the door had been jammed and they had been unable to open it before smelling fuel and fumes. They abandoned that rescue effort for their own safety. Passengers further back in the train heard explosions. At the very rear, passengers said they felt only a small jolt.

The third rail sections lifted up and punctured the floor of the train's first car, with the first short segment remaining on the floor while later ones, with one exception that came through a different hole, accumulated atop the seats in the center of the compartment. A final one went up into the roof and punctured the second car at that point as well.

Investigators determined later that the fires in the first car were fueled by a combination of flaming debris from the third-rail cover, materials from Brody's ML350 and interior components of the train car. While none of the third rail components showed any sign of electrical arcing, there was some localized burn damage on some segments.

Due to disruptions in the railroad's electrical system created by the accident, the third rails were not completely de-energized immediately. Damage to a transition jumper isolated the rail on the eastern track south of the crossing from its counterpart on the western track north of the crossing. The former lost power within eight seconds of the collision. But circuit breakers that had detected that loss restored it to the last four cars of the train, which remained in contact with that rail. A manual override was sent from the office of Metro-North's power director at GCT a minute and a half afterwards.

=== Rescue efforts ===
Smalls went back into the burning train several times to rescue passengers. "He did everything he could," said Anthony Bottalico, head of Association of Commuter Rail Employees, the labor union which represents Metro-North workers. The train knocked Brody's SUV a distance of 665 feet (203 m) up the tracks, dislodging more than 450 feet (140 m) of the third rail, and breaking it into 13 39-foot (12 m) segments, most of which accumulated in the front car's passenger compartment, and then into the second car. The New York Daily News reported that physical trauma from the third-rail segments was responsible for most of the deaths on the train; later the NTSB reported that four of the passenger fatalities, like Brody, died of blunt force trauma.

The Valhalla volunteer fire department and ambulance corps responded; injured passengers were taken to nearby Westchester Medical Center (WMC). By the time firefighters reached the scene, the first train car was almost fully engulfed and thus there was little they could do to help evacuate it; most of the passengers had already managed to do so on their own. The firefighters were, however, able to suppress the fire before it could spread to the second car. To facilitate triage and busing evacuated passengers from the scene, the Taconic was closed in both directions at the intersection.

== Victims ==
Brody and five passengers aboard the train were killed.

The victims were:

- Ellen Schaeffer Brody, 49, of Edgemont, driver of the SUV, and a bookkeeper and sales associate at a Chappaqua jewelry store
- Robert Dirks, 36, of Chappaqua, a computational chemist at D.E. Shaw Research in Manhattan
- Walter Liedtke, 69, of Bedford Hills, curator of European art at the Metropolitan Museum of Art and author of a two-volume guide to the Dutch paintings in the museum's collection
- Joseph Nadol, 42, of Ossining, an aerospace and defense equity analyst at JPMorgan Chase
- Aditya Tomar, 41, of Danbury, Connecticut, vice president for technology supporting the JP Morgan Chase asset management team
- Eric Vandercar, 53, of Bedford Hills, senior managing director of international sales and trading at the New York office of Mesirow Financial

There were a total of six deaths and fifteen injuries. All the deaths save one of the passengers were attributed to blunt force trauma; that exception was due to burns and other injuries making it difficult to determine the cause. None of the passengers had soot in their airways. Nine surviving passengers were taken to WMC, with one in very serious condition.

It was the deadliest passenger train crash in the United States since the 2009 Washington Metro train collision, which killed nine people and injured 80 others. It is also the deadliest crash in Metro-North's history and was the second Metro-North train incident to result in passenger fatalities, after the derailment 14 months earlier on the railroad's Hudson Line near Spuyten Duyvil that killed four.

== Aftermath ==
The train's lead car caught fire; damage was estimated at $3.7 million ($4.9 million in 2025). Uninjured passengers were taken to a nearby climbing gym where they were able to stay warm until replacement buses arrived. A police helicopter with thermal imaging equipment scanned the nearby Kensico Cemetery in search of survivors who might have wandered away from the scene and collapsed into the snow, but found none.

As a result of the crash, Harlem Line service was suspended between Pleasantville and North White Plains. On the afternoon of February 4, the day after the incident, the NTSB gave permission for Metro-North crews to clear the site. A crew of 100 cleared the vehicles, using a hi-rail crane to remove the SUV. The train was towed to Metro-North's North White Plains yard after 6 p.m., and workers proceeded to repair the damaged third rail. Metro-North service resumed the following morning, with delays of 15 minutes for trains to slow down at the accident site. Commerce Street reopened to automotive traffic on the afternoon of February 5.

=== Social and cultural commentary ===
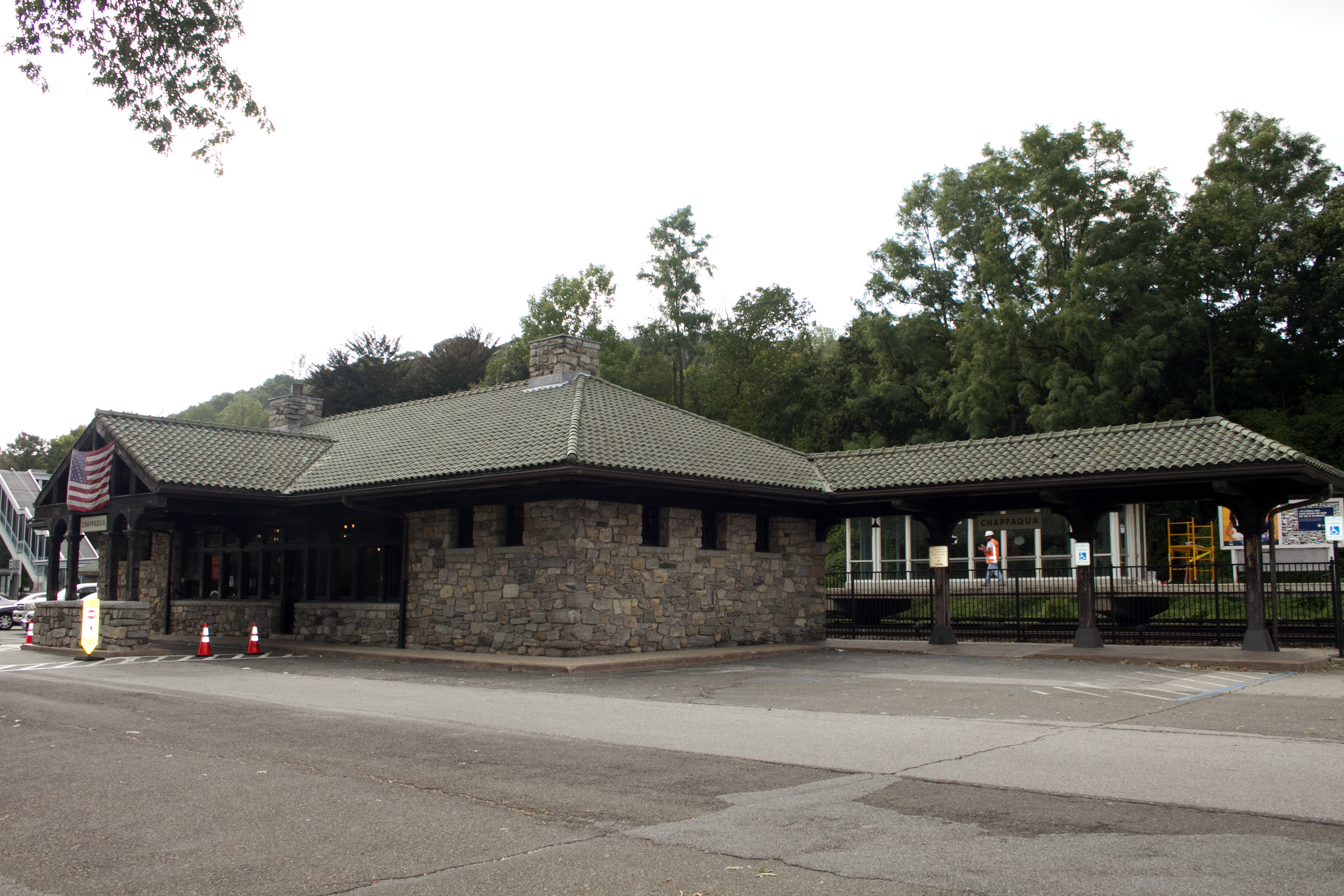
Chappaqua's old station building, listed on the National Register of Historic Places

Following the accident, some commentators discussed its relation to suburban life in central Westchester County, where many communities originally developed due to commuter rail. The accident had a particularly pronounced impact in Chappaqua, where the train was to make its first stop, as three of the victims had connections to the hamlet.

Early fears that the fatalities would mostly be from Chappaqua were unfounded, as most commuters from the hamlet ride in the rear cars for the shorter walk to the parking lot once the train does stop. Residents nevertheless felt anxious about having to take the train again. According to a psychiatrist at a nearby hospital, "the exposure goes well beyond simply knowing people on the train". The interim pastor at Nadol's Church of St. Mary the Virgin noted that communities like Chappaqua depend on commuter rail for economic and cultural reasons: "[T]his has hit us at a place that is just integral to our existence, and therefore in a place where we are very, very vulnerable."

Writing in The New Yorker, Sam Tanenhaus, who by then had been living in nearby Tarrytown for over 25 years, saw the accident as highlighting how:

... the paradox of Westchester—its lure and deception—is captured in its antiquated, overcrowded tangle of bucolic "parkways". Parkways such as the Taconic, and winding roads like Commerce, once represented the county's rural charm, the possibility of living in the country yet close to the city, but while they were still charming they were now, with the area so heavily developed, "treacherous" with traffic. It's all a symptom of suburban congestion—and, perhaps, also of a blighted dream as life "in the country" increasingly replicates the ills of the city left behind.

Tanenhaus saw the car's collision with a commuter train as another indicator of the way in which Westchester had left the contradictions between its past and present unresolved. At the time of the crash, Westchester was one of the few places in the country where many workers still commute by rail. In addition, all the five passengers who had died were men, recalling the mid-20th century when commuters were overwhelmingly male, working in the city while their wives tended the suburban homes. Tanenhaus likened the accident to something from the works of writer John Cheever, who lived in nearby Briarcliff Manor and set much of his fiction amid the suburbs, featuring commuters as his characters: "[He] might have conjured the haunting details of the Harlem Line crash: the lead-footed irony of 'Valhalla,' the survivors wandering through the cemetery to safety."

== Investigation ==
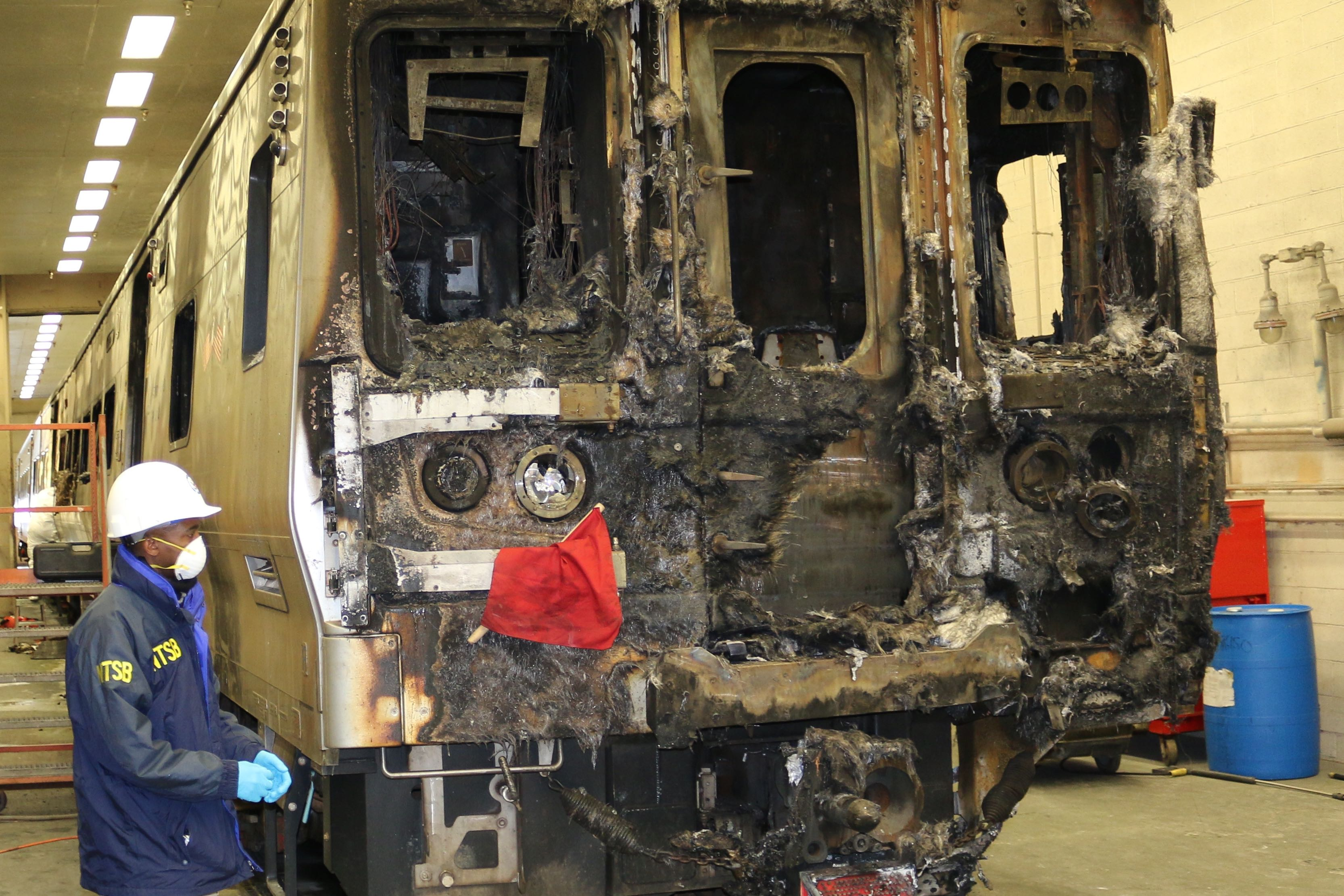
The train involved in the accident at a maintenance facility for further examination

On the night of the accident, the National Transportation Safety Board (NTSB) opened an investigation into the accident, and dispatched a go-team to the site. They planned to stay for a week, collecting evidence and interviewing witnesses.

=== Theories and issues ===
Investigators said they were particularly interested in one of the crash's unusual aspects. "We do have grade-crossing accidents, and most of the time it's fatal for occupants of the vehicles, and not for train passengers," Robert Sumwalt of the NTSB told The Journal News, Westchester County's main daily newspaper. George Bibel, author of Train Wreck: The Forensics of Rail Disasters, agreed that this is uncommon, since trains usually force cars off the tracks. But there were other exceptions to this pattern, such as the 2005 Glendale train crash in southern California, at that time the deadliest in the history of Metrolink. An SUV abandoned at a grade crossing by a driver who changed his mind about suicide derailed the train that struck it, killing 11.

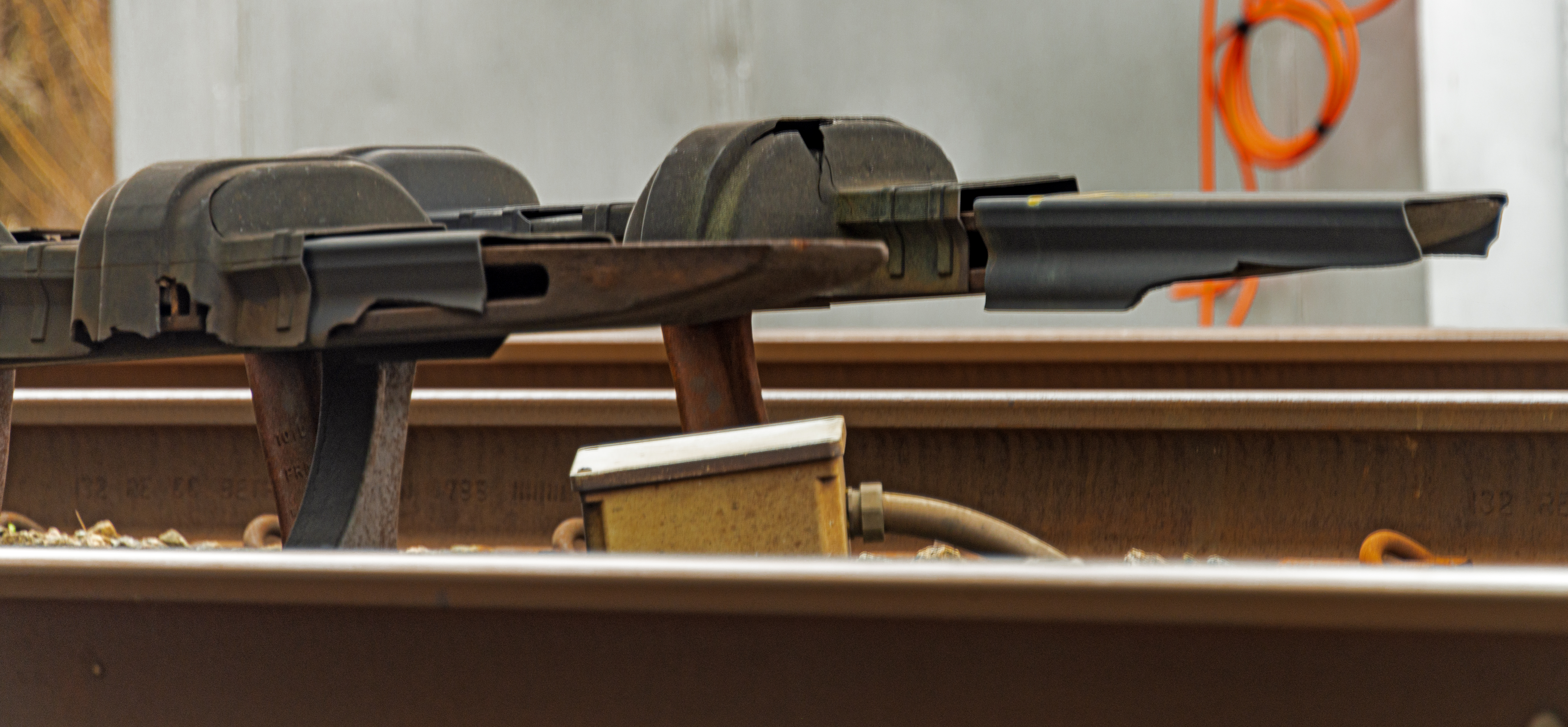
The wedge-shaped end of the third rail just north of the grade crossing

Another unusual aspect was the configuration of the third rail. On most American commuter-rail agencies that operate trains powered by third rails, contact shoes are on top of their third rail. Those on Metro-North trains, however, draw current from underneath the third rail. This configuration prevents ice from building up on top during winter months and reduce the possibility of inadvertent contact with the high-voltage rail by anything other than the shoe. To facilitate this, the ends of the third rails adjacent to grade crossings have a slight upturn.

Shoes on a Metro-North train underrunning the third rail as it comes to a stop

"This has never happened before, and this is a rare configuration of a third rail," (Note: Besides Metro-North, the only other rail line that uses under-running third rails in the U.S. is the Market–Frankford Line on the Philadelphia subway. The NTSB report erroneously also identifies the Long Island Rail Road, also operated by Metro-North's parent agency, the Metropolitan Transportation Authority, as using this system.) U.S. Senator Chuck Schumer said. "Do those two add up to the explanation for this terrible, terrible tragedy? Very possibly." But Steve Ditmeyer, a former Federal Railroad Administration (FRA) official, told the Associated Press it would be impossible to be sure that an under-running shoe lifted the rail without also doing tests to see if the same thing would happen in the more common over-running configuration. He believed that the SUV's impact explained the lifting of the rail.

The NTSB team theorized that the fire aboard the train might have been caused by gasoline from the SUV, ignited by a spark from the third rail, which had pierced the car's fuel tank. However, said Sumwalt, the primary issue was the vehicle's presence in the crossing. The NTSB team believed the crossing was functioning properly, but was aware also that the earlier accident on the Taconic had led to more traffic through it. The board wanted to know whether the detour had made the crash more likely.

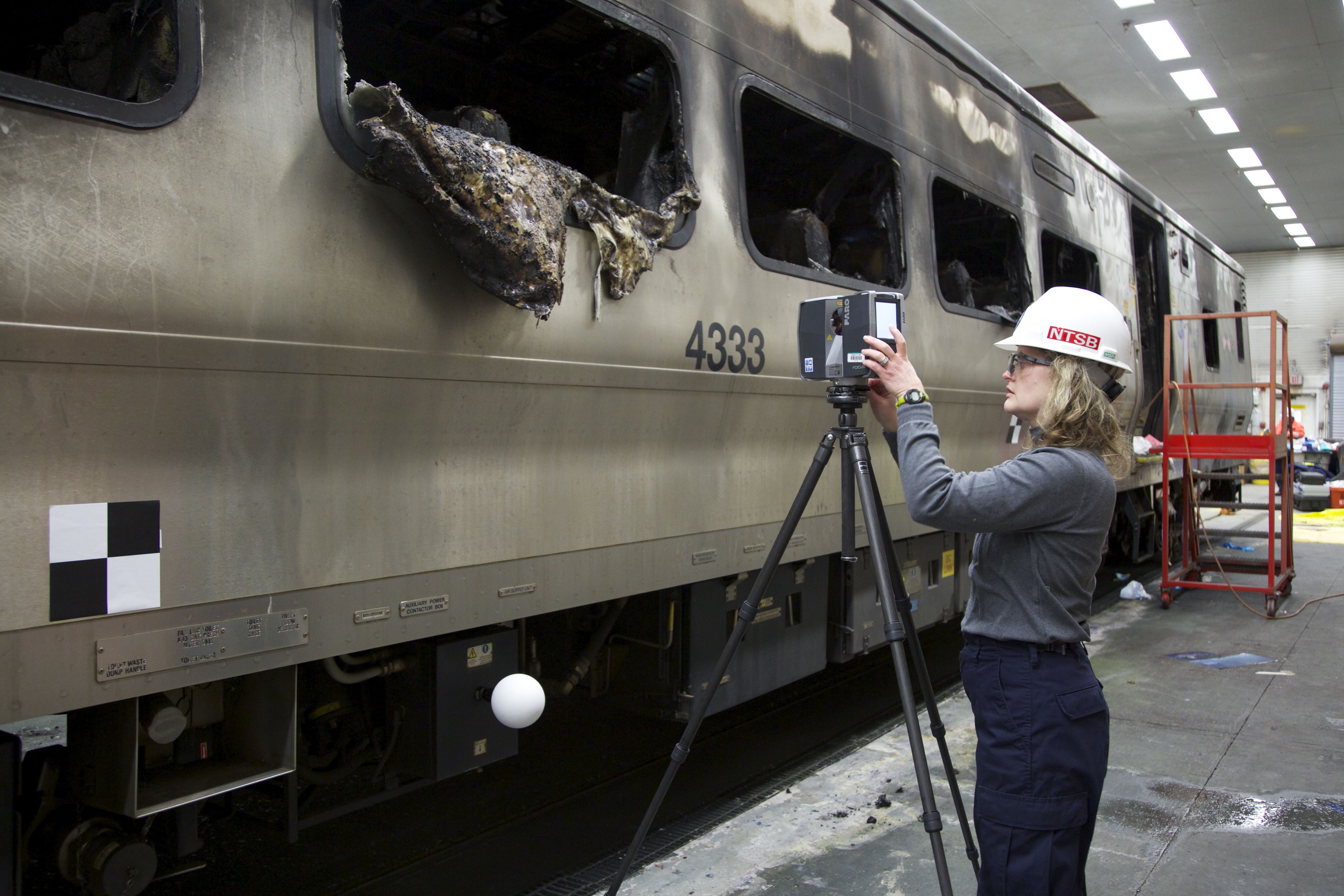
An NTSB investigator examines the damaged train car

Some residents of the area suggested the crossing itself was the problem. County Executive Rob Astorino, who said his commute takes him through that area, called the intersections and turns "very confusing for drivers". Lance Sexton, a Manhattan resident who commutes to the area to assemble electronic equipment, described using it to The New York Times: "[C]oming down the hill of the cemetery, you have to put the brakes on earlier ... There's a bank there that always collects water, making it even more dangerous." He also said he and his coworkers often complained about how quickly the train came after the gates went down, gates which had been installed after a 1984 crash killed a van driver. "How safe is that crossing—for this to happen again?" that victim's sister asked the newspaper. (Note: Another fatality occurred near the crossing in 2018, when a pedestrian on the tracks was struck on the night of January 30; it was not reported why he was there and if that had anything to do with the crossing.)

The crossing had undergone upgrades in recent years, including brighter lights and an additional sign warning passing drivers not to stop on the tracks. But an upgrade planned for 2009, which would have added a sign with flashing lights 100–200 feet (30–61 m) up the road west of the tracks, was not installed. "It's way too early to be guessing about what could have or couldn't have made a difference," said a spokesman for the New York State Department of Transportation.

Three days later, the NTSB investigators announced that all safety features at the crossing—the gate, its flashing lights, the train's horn, and a sign 65 feet (20 m) away warning drivers not to stop on the tracks—were in good working order and had functioned properly at the time of the accident. The gates had gone down 39 seconds before the train reached the crossing, they said, meaning Brody had spent almost that amount of time inside them. They next focused on whether she was familiar with the road and whether she was using a phone at the time; later her cellphone records showed the call to her husband that had ended six minutes before the accident, during which, he said, she had told him that she was unsure of where she was.

The ML350's gear-shift lever design also came up as a possible factor several weeks later. It uses a small paddle that protrudes from the steering column, instead of a large lever between the seats. To put the vehicle in drive, the driver must push the paddle down; pulling it up puts it in reverse. The Brodys had only bought the SUV two months earlier, Consumer Reports noted. It was possible Ellen might have still been getting used to this newer method of changing gears, and making the occasional mistake, which could have been the reason she moved into the train's path after Hope had backed up. "If someone isn't familiar with one of these systems, they could do exactly the wrong thing in an emergency," said the magazine's director of auto testing, Jake Fisher, who admitted to having made that mistake more than once.

== Reports and conclusions ==
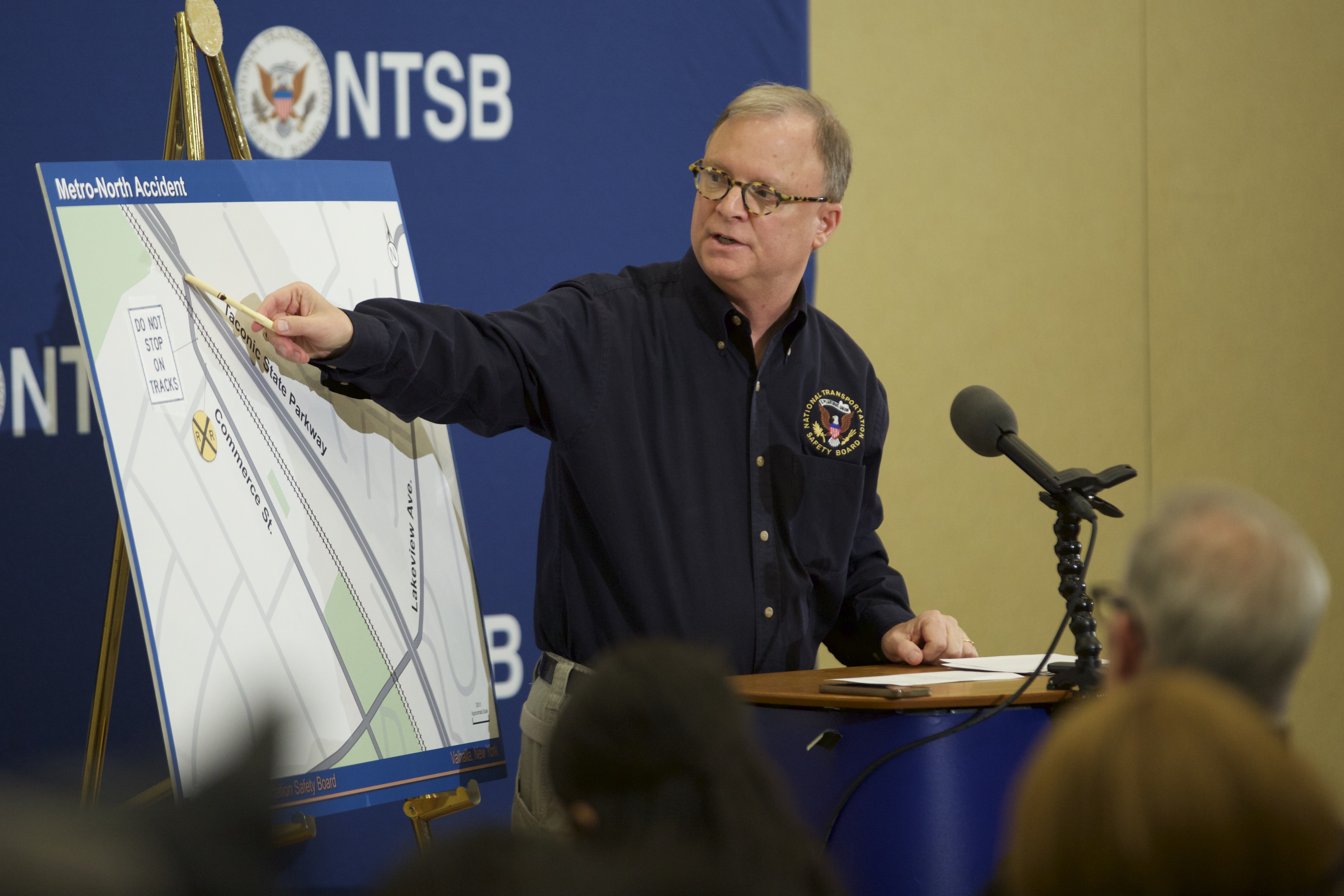
NTSB chair Robert Sumwalt presents information on the crash

The NTSB released a preliminary report into the accident three weeks afterward. It did not release its final report for over two years, to the consternation of local officials awaiting any safety recommendations the board was expected to make. Rep. Nita Lowey contrasted that timeline with the ten months it took the NTSB to issue its final report on the December 2013 Spuyten Duyvil derailment on Metro-North's Hudson Line, which killed four, and the 16 months it took to issue its report on the 2008 California wreck that had prompted Congress to mandate positive train control. The NTSB never explained why it was taking so long.

The final report found the probable cause of the accident to be "the driver of the sport-utility vehicle, for undetermined reasons, moving the vehicle on to the tracks". In addition, the driver stopping within the crossing and leaving the vehicle during the warning period, the third rail penetrating the passenger car, and the post-accident fire were all found to be contributing factors.

=== Driver's behavior ===
The original question, why Ellen Brody had driven forward into the path of the train and thus made the accident inevitable, could not be answered conclusively due to her death. (Note: "The NTSB concludes the SUV driver, for undetermined reasons, did not comply with the advance warning system at the Commerce Street grade crossing; stopped past the stop line within the boundary of the grade crossing; and moved on to the tracks.") The NTSB had investigated some of the theories that had been put forth. It found many of them unlikely or insufficient explanations for her action.

Ellen appeared to have slept well, according to her husband Alan, in the days leading up to the accident. Her cell phone records showed no sign that she was awake between midnight and 9 a.m. when she usually slept, and her coworkers said she had exhibited no exhaustion at her job. She took medication for her hypothyroidism, which could have left her fatigued if she had missed a dose, but her husband said that did not appear to have happened.

The investigators also considered whether Ellen had been able to hear or see the train coming. Using a similar 2011 ML350, they measured the volume of the train horn at the distances where she might have been able to get out of the train's way. They found that the horn became distinctly louder from inside the vehicle when it was 350 feet (110 m) away, about four seconds before impact. From 100 feet (30 m), the horn's volume was measured at 93.5 decibels (dB), 50.5 dB louder than ambient noise level inside the Mercedes, much higher than the 13 dB level above ambient recommended by ISO 7731 for audibility of emergency signals and warnings. The investigators allowed, however, that their tests were done with the car's radio and heater off, which may not have been the case with Brody's car that night.

Whether the train's lights were visible was harder to determine. From where Ellen was when she was out of her car, on its driver's side, the vehicle itself as well as the nearby substation would have partially obscured the approaching train. Other light sources in the area, from other vehicles (as Hope had speculated), the perimeter of a nearby building and her own car, may also have distracted her as she returned to the ML350.

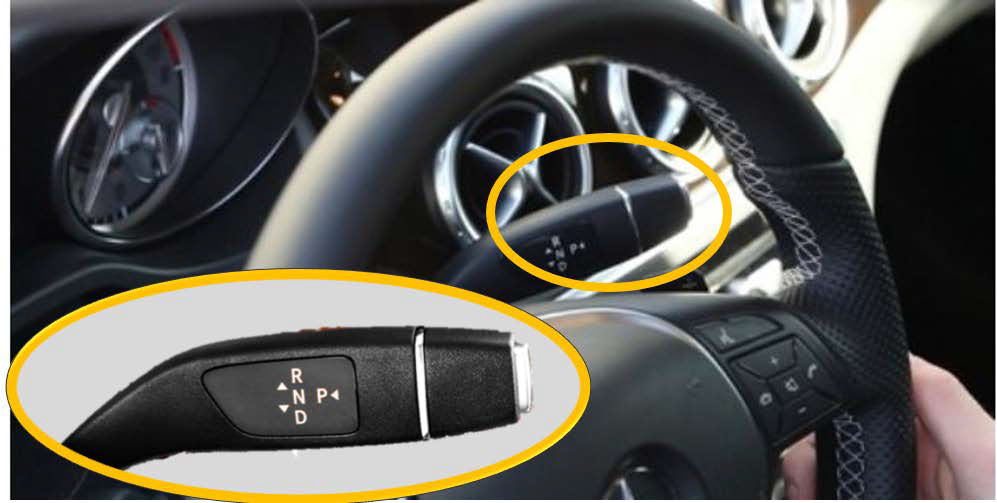
NTSB photo of the steering wheel and shifter on a similar ML350, with the shifter highlighted

The report next considered whether Ellen might have made a mistake with the shifter, as speculated. Prior to purchasing the used ML350 two months earlier she had driven a Honda with a shifter in the more common position between the front seats. Alan told the NTSB that she had not told him of any problems using the column-mounted shifter, which he had also used when driving the SUV and found easy to get used to. The investigators consulted with the National Highway Traffic Safety Administration and found neither recalls nor complaints related to the shifter positioning or operation. They noted that the motions required for drive and reverse on the test ML350 were similar to those required for a floor-based shifter, and concluded there was "insufficient evidence" that the column-mounted shifter was a factor in the accident.

While the Mercedes was equipped with a GPS navigation system, Alan was not sure whether Ellen used it. Had she done so, it might have provided additional warning that a grade crossing was nearby. The NTSB noted that the Federal Railroad Administration had been working to update its grade crossing database and provide it to the manufacturers of GPS systems; it expected to have that done by late 2017. (Note: By the end of the 2010s, few GPS manufacturers had added that data to their systems. In April 2020 Waze announced it was adding a feature that would alert drivers using the app to an upcoming grade crossing for beta testing in the U.S., Canada and France; later that year it expanded the rollout and added more countries, relying on crowdsourcing for crossing locations in some of them.)

Ultimately, the NTSB theorized that Ellen was distracted by the gate that had hit the rear of the SUV and the possibility that it had been dented. "[We] conclude that after the grade crossing activated," it wrote, "the driver's attention was most likely diverted to the crossing gate arm striking her vehicle, and she was unaware of the proximity of the approaching train."

=== Traffic signal preemption ===
Beyond Brody, the NTSB found some issues with the infrastructure. The traffic signal preemption circuits for both the grade crossing and the Taconic, meant to extend the green signal for vehicles on Commerce when the crossing is activated, were in good working order but it could not be determined which of the two was taking precedence at the time of the accident since there was no recording device. Investigators did, however, find that the circuits gave precedence to the highway signal when its preemption was on, in violation of the federal Manual on Uniform Traffic Control Devices (MUTCD), which mandates that the grade crossing preemption circuit always has priority in situations where a crossing is in close proximity to a traffic light.

This did not appear to have contributed to the accident, as Smalls had said there was nothing in front of her and she could easily have cleared the tracks had she become aware sooner of the oncoming train. Nevertheless, in May 2015, the state Department of Transportation (NYSDOT) adjusted the preemptions at the scene to give proper precedence to the crossing circuit when activated and extended the green signal for traffic on Commerce from the existing 2–10-second range, to 29 seconds, followed by four seconds of yellow, to allow even long vehicles like tractor trailers to clear the crossing. NYSDOT also directed its regions to ensure that every other such signal in the state was in compliance with the MUTCD requirement.

=== Design of third rails ===
The NTSB did not address whether Metro-North's use of under-running third rails had contributed to the severity of the accident. Instead, it found the design of the rails themselves did.

It is extremely rare, the report said, for displaced sections of any rail to puncture and enter a rail vehicle during an accident, as had happened at Valhalla. During his interview with investigators, Metro-North's power director told them he believed the third rails were designed to break up in accidents and fall to the side, away from the train, since they had done so during the 1984 single-fatality accident at that same crossing. But in this case, with only two exceptions, the third rail's 6-foot (2 m) sections had largely remained joined in larger sections. Five of the 11 recovered were 39 feet (12 m) in length, weighing a ton (800 kg) each, as they accumulated in the first and second cars.

In those sections, investigators observed fractures in the splice bars and bolts used to hold the sections together, but not the rail sections themselves. They then obtained the rail's design specifications from the manufacturer and, based on Metro-North's own maintenance diagrams of how those rail sections were to be joined, developed a computer simulation using finite element modeling to determine how the rail might react to loads and stresses similar to those it would likely have experienced during the accident, both horizontally and vertically.

Those simulations showed that the rail's splice bars would have required high deformation levels before breaking when bent in an upwards direction. They did not experience sufficient stress to break until the rail sections had already entered the railcar. "This accident demonstrated that Metro-North's third rail assembly catastrophically compromised a passenger railcar with fatal consequences," the report concluded. "The third rail entering the lead railcar caused significant damage and increased the number and severity of injuries and fatalities."

The NTSB recommended that not just Metro-North, but all the nation's passenger rail services that use third-rail systems with grade crossings, (Note: In addition to Metro-North and the Long Island Rail Road (LIRR), the report listed Amtrak, the SEPTA, and the Port Authority Trans-Hudson (PATH) trains between Manhattan and New Jersey.) undertake a risk assessment of those crossings and take corrective measures, such as joining rails in a manner designed to experience controlled failure during a similar accident. It also recommended that the Federal Transit Administration notify all the other railroads and require them to carry out the risk assessment, as well as the correction of any deficiencies identified.

On the 10th anniversary of the disaster, an attorney for several of the surviving passengers complained that no changes had been made to the third rail at the crossing that would make it safer were another accident to happen. Andrew Maloney noted that it was still 18 inches (46 cm) above the ground and the replacement rails were not designed to break into smaller sections on impact.

=== Fire ===
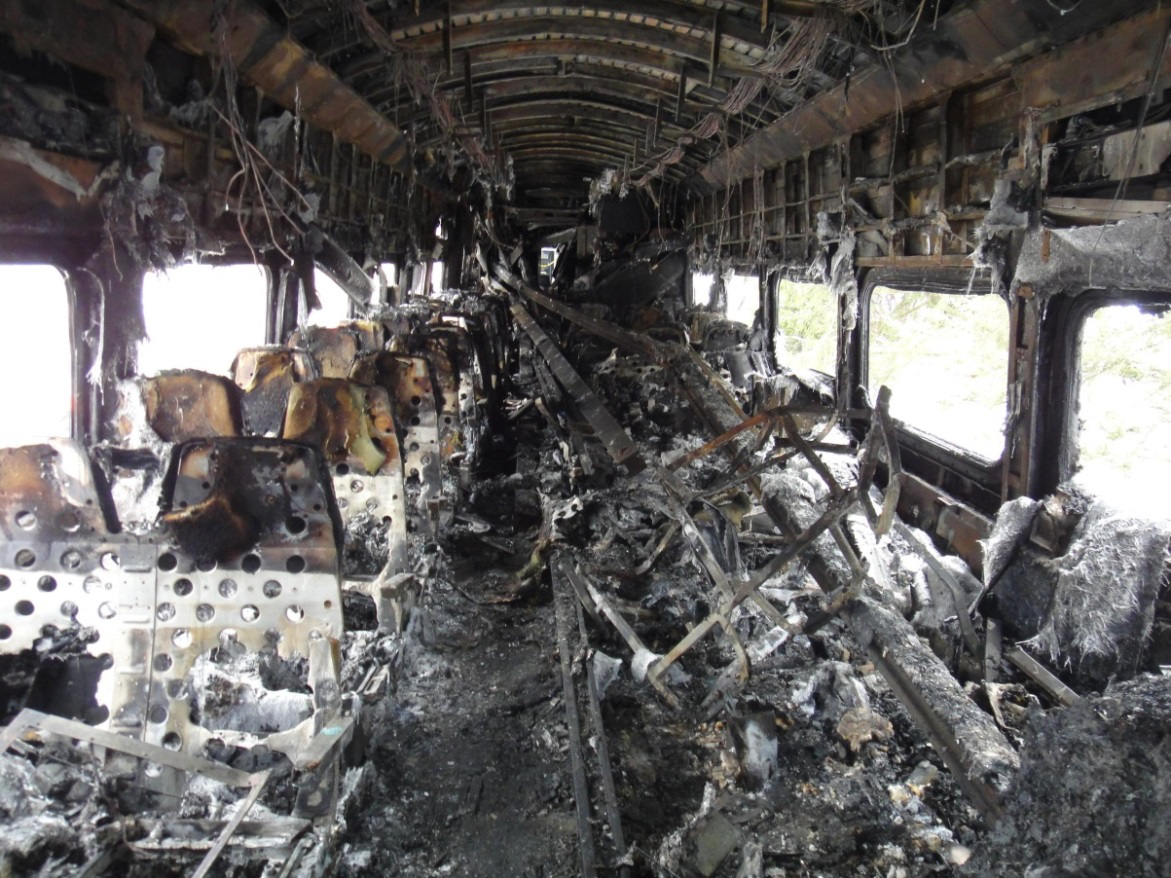
Interior of the train's lead car some time after the accident, showing extensive fire damage and the displaced third rail sections

The NTSB also looked at how the fire had started and whether anything could have been done to prevent it. Surviving passengers said it began with sparks from the rails as they entered the car; debris from the ML350 and the rail cover, a polymer-based material, ignited along with fuel from the SUV's tank that had gotten on the rail. From these sources many small fires developed, merging to the point that when Smalls was able to get out of the cab after the train stopped, he recalled that the center and rear of the car were already significantly ablaze.

Passengers in the center and rear were able to use the emergency exits as intended to escape the car since the rear door was jammed by a section of third rail that had gone through it. The NTSB believed that this had prevented additional deaths and injuries among them. In fact none of the five deaths on the train were a result of the fire; no soot was found in those passengers' airways.

Nevertheless, investigators wanted to know whether any of the train car's interior finishes, or the materials introduced into the interior by the collision, might have contributed to the fire. Since the first car was so badly damaged, they collected samples of seat covers, wall panels and light lenses from the second car. Upon installation when that car first came into service in 2000, the seat upholstery materials had met FRA flammability standards as required by regulation. Testing carried out after the accident showed they no longer did. (Note: The NTSB noted that flammability resistance in materials can decrease naturally over time) The FRA regulations did not require that the materials be reassessed at any point during their service life.

=== NTSB member statements ===
Three of the four members of the NTSB filed individual statements to go with the report. Two, acting chairman Robert Sumwalt and T. Bella Dinh-Zarr, concurred with the report's findings; Sumwalt joined Dinh-Zarr's statement. A week after the report was released, a third member, Earl Weener, filed a dissenting statement.

==== Concurrences ====
Sumwalt wrote that, whatever some readers might have hoped, it would never be possible for the board to explain Brody's presence on the tracks due to her death. As he saw it, she "simply did not realize she was on or near railroad tracks" despite the signs and pavement markings. Those were outweighed, in his opinion, by her unfamiliarity with the neighborhood, the fact that the crossing was unlit beyond the warning lights, and the distraction created by the bumper-to-bumper traffic along the Commerce detour.

To the chairman, the strongest evidence for his theory was the way she had calmly left the ML350 to inspect its rear and remove the barrier that had gotten caught on it. "Someone in a good state of mind, as this driver apparently was, who is aware that they are in close proximity to a railroad crossing, and in imminent danger of being struck by a train going 60 mph [97 km/h], would not act this way", Sumwalt said. He noted that in another grade crossing accident in California shortly after the Valhalla crash, a driver had turned his pickup truck onto the tracks inadvertently out of confusion created by a nearby intersection. Sumwalt reiterated the report's call for the makers of GPS navigation hardware and software to incorporate the FRA's database of grade crossings into their products so that drivers using them had additional awareness that they were crossing active tracks when they did so.

Dinh-Zarr, in her statement, defended the NTSB's work in investigating the accident and its conclusions. Like Sumwalt, she said, Brody's death made it impossible to determine why she drove onto the tracks. So the board thus concluded that had caused the accident after examining every other possible cause and ruling them out when they found regulatory compliance and no deficiencies. The report's recommendations, she concluded, "will aid in preventing this type of tragic accident in the future."

==== Dissent ====
The dissenting member, Weener, dismissed speculation as to Brody's motives. He agreed that the evidence suggested Brody had "likely lost situational awareness" between when she saw the marking signs and when she reached the tracks. But he pointed out that among the unknowns were whether Brody knew the impact to her car was from the descending barrier—she could have just as easily thought it could have been Hope's vehicle, he observed, and gone out to check—and whether she had adequate time and space to back up into the space Hope created. She may well have known she was near the tracks and left the ML350 to see where she was in relation to them, since it had blind spots at the front and rear, Weener added.

The important question, to Weener, was how the SUV had ended up within the crossing gates, more so than what Brody believed. He asked two other questions he felt deserved more consideration: Were the federal standards the markings and signs conformed to strong enough? Were drivers adequately educated that the barriers were designed to break if they needed to get out of a crossing in a hurry, or that they should continue forward with greater speed from the crossing in that situation rather than back up, much as they are trained to do when a green light turns yellow as they enter an intersection?

"I am left unsatisfied as to how the configuration of this angled crossing, the signage approaching the crossing, the deterrent effect of existing New York rail crossing statutes, and the New York State driver education regarding rail crossing safety may have affected these events", Weener concluded. "I am concerned that the statement of probable cause does not reflect the real causes of this accident."

== Post-accident official responses ==
Since the accident, the town of Mount Pleasant and the Metropolitan Transportation Authority (MTA), Metro-North's parent agency, have responded to some of the issues discussed in the NTSB report.

=== Proposed closure of crossing ===
While the NTSB investigated and prepared its report, the town conducted a traffic study to determine whether the Commerce Street crossing should be closed. It also considered doing the same for the Cleveland Street crossing in downtown Valhalla, just south of the station. This would reduce the number of grade crossings along the line from four—the most of any town in the county—to two within a two miles (3.2 km) stretch. The town found that the Commerce Street crossing met many of the Federal Highway Administration's criteria for closure: high passenger train volume and speed, low road traffic volume, multiple tracks, the mere 82-foot (25 m) distance to a traffic signal, a poor approach angle (62°), poor visibility due to the substation, and the two fatal accidents in its history. The town deferred taking action or making the study public until the NTSB released its report on the crash, which recommended closing the crossing.

In October 2017 the town made details of the plan public. It would compensate for the loss of westbound traffic at the intersection by changing the timing of the traffic signals on the Taconic, adding a left turn lane at the Lakeview intersection, and restricting truck traffic to local deliveries. A study by the town engineer had estimated that the town could be assessed damages of up to $120 million for the accident despite being able to do little to prevent it, an amount that would have an extreme adverse effect on the town's finances. "My position is, when I'm told that something is dangerous and we haven't done anything about it, what is my liability?" asked town supervisor Carl Fulgenzi. "I'm not putting this town in this kind of liability any further." The $12–15 million cost would largely be borne by NYSDOT, whom the MTA had already petitioned for the closing. (Note: Six weeks after the accident, a similar incident at a grade crossing on the line north of Chappaqua, where the crossing gate came down on the car of a driver who was able to back up, brought the issue into the news again. Officials in the town of North Castle, where that crossing is located, talked not of closing the crossing in question but perhaps elevating the road over the tracks, which they admitted would take considerable time and money. In the meantime they opted to add an increased focus on crossing safety in drivers' education classes at a nearby high school, and paint the pavement on the road and add more markers.)

However, residents in the area, particularly those who lived near the crossings, objected vehemently. One woman from Thornwood, a hamlet of Mount Pleasant just north of the accident site, drew applause at a later meeting when she said she had learned how to handle grade crossings during her high school driver's education classes. "[Brody] made a tragic error," she said. "People died, but you can't close crossings that have been working perfectly fine since I've been in this town for 52 years."

Similar objections came from Valhalla residents who would be affected by closing the Cleveland Street crossing, noting the lack of any accidents there. Two Valhalla fire commissioners also expressed concern that changes to the local roads would be unable to accommodate large fire trucks. Other residents accused Fulgenzi of being biased in favor of closing Cleveland, since he has advocated doing so for several years, and thus could not keep an "open mind" when evaluating the plan. "I'm only one vote" on the town board, he responded.

=== MTA grade crossing safety campaign ===
After the accident, the MTA began promoting grade crossing safety through a multimedia campaign. It added to its website a page developed in conjunction with Operation Lifesaver (OLI), an organization that works to promote rail safety among the public, particularly at grade crossings. Informational posters, reminding passengers to "Wait Behind the Gate" when they drive through grade crossings, went up in trains and at stations on the Metro-North, the Long Island Rail Road (LIRR), and the New York City Subway.

The campaign was also spread electronically. Video public service announcements ran on screens in larger stations served by MTA trains, including GCT, Penn Station and Fulton Center. They were also run on Facebook and the websites for many newspapers in the New York metropolitan area. Filmed versions ran before movies. According to the NTSB, the MTA reported success in reaching a population with the OLI material that had rarely, if at all, been exposed to it before.

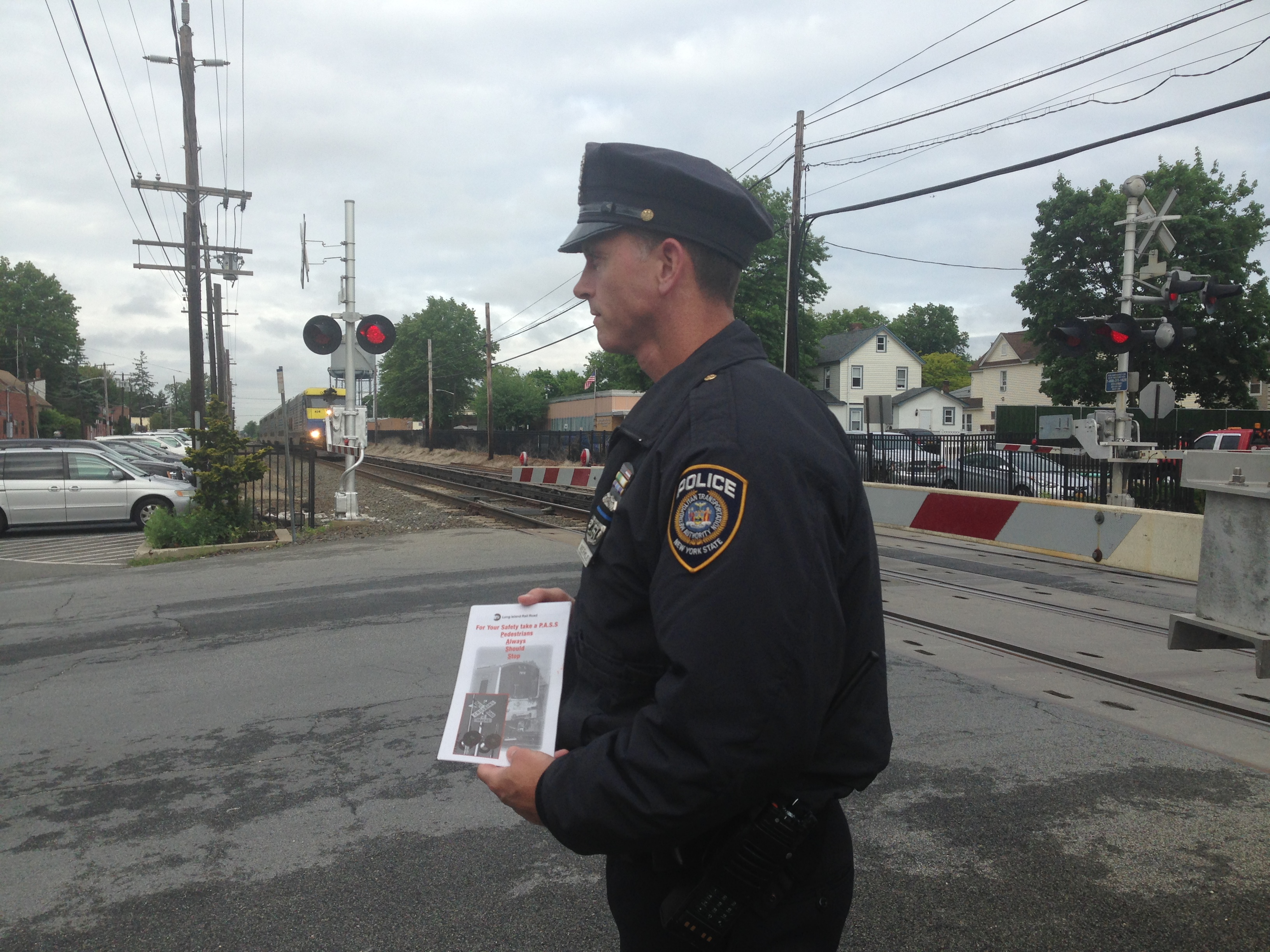
MTA police officer with information on grade crossing safety at a Long Island grade crossing on International Level Crossing Awareness Day, five months after the Valhalla accident

Enforcement efforts supplemented the education and public outreach. The MTA police worked with local law enforcement to create a Right of Way Task Force. Officers handed out pamphlets to drivers, pedestrians and train passengers at the many grade crossings in the metropolitan area, but also went as far as issuing summonses to violators, even arresting five, by November 2016.

=== Safety improvements to Commerce Street crossing ===
In September 2016, it was announced that the Commerce Street crossing, where the accident occurred, would be one of 43 MTA-operated railroad crossings to get closed-circuit television upgrades, paid for by a $1.9 million grant from the FRA. The CCTV installations, part of a wider project by the MTA to improve safety at railroad crossings, would help the MTA "investigate specific incidents and analyze crossing/traffic operations for targeted modifications to improve safety."

Six years later, Senator Chuck Schumer secured a $100 million federal grant for Metro-North to improve safety at grade crossings; most of it would be spent to build an overpass over the tracks and the Saw Mill River Parkway at Roaring Brook Road, near a school in Chappaqua further up the line. Alan Brody complained that most of the railroad's efforts have gone to implementing positive train control as the NTSB had recommended after the Spuyten Duyvil wreck, which would not have prevented the Valhalla accident any more than the CCTV would. He pointed out that much cheaper measures, such as putting strobe lights on the gates and bollards in the center of the road, would greatly reduce the risk at Commerce. The MTA said it was instituting partnerships with Waze and other measures to better ensure that motorists knew they were approaching crossings.

== Litigation ==
Three months after the accident, the MTA had received 34 separate notices of claim, the first step toward filing a lawsuit. Most were from passengers injured or killed, or their surviving relatives, all alleging negligence. The Brodys' attorney alleged that money allocated for the 2009 improvement that would have brought the crossing to federal standards was never spent. The widow of victim Robert Dirks filed a negligence lawsuit naming the town, county and Metro-North, as well as Smalls the engineer as defendants, claiming Smalls could have stopped the train earlier. The lawsuit pointed to data from the train's event recorder showing that he had continued blowing the horn for five seconds until he began braking, 260 feet (79 m) from the intersection when the train was traveling at 59 miles per hour (95 km/h). The lawyers speculated that if he had hit the brake immediately perhaps the collision could have been less severe or avoided entirely. Smalls answered that he had been trained to use the horn first if the tracks were blocked at a crossing, and not immediately use the emergency brake until he was sure of what was blocking the tracks, since that could cause a derailment and injure any standing passengers in the train.

Plaintiffs' lawyers were not deterred by the NTSB's finding that Ellen Brody caused the crash by driving onto the tracks as the train approached. Her husband had disagreed with that, saying the crossing warnings were dated and could have been upgraded.

In 2018 it was disclosed that Smalls had reached a confidential settlement of a legal claim he had made against the MTA; his attorney said the engineer had never returned to work, was no longer employed by Metro-North, and had post-traumatic stress disorder as a result of the crash. Attorneys for the surviving passengers and the families of the dead accused the MTA of "buy[ing] his silence". Around the crash's fourth anniversary, The Journal News reported that lawyers for injured passengers and families of the dead were focusing on the third rail's failure to break up as a contributing cause.

In 2024, a jury hearing a suit brought by 30 passengers found the railroad mostly liable for the accident, through its failure to maintain the third rail and properly train Smalls. The remainder of the fault was assigned to Brody, which her family and attorney disagreed with. "All she needed was two or three seconds to get off the tracks", said their attorney. Metro-North said it disagreed with the verdict and was considering all its legal options; the damage amount will be fixed at a later trial. Federal law at the time of the accident limits total damages in rail accidents to $200 million; shortly afterwards that cap was increased to $322 million.

Mount Pleasant settled with the plaintiffs for roughly $3 million in 2025.

== See also ==
- 2015 in rail transport
- 2015 in the United States

=== Lists ===
- List of American railroad accidents
- List of level crossing crashes
- List of rail accidents (2010–2019)
- List of traffic collisions (2000–present)
- List of transportation fires

=== Other transportation accidents with similar elements ===
- 1995 Fox River Grove bus–train collision, suburban Chicago school bus struck by commuter train during morning rush hour, killing seven students; crossing was also located near major highway, bus was struck by crossing gate yet the distracted substitute driver did not realize vehicle was not clear of tracks, and investigation found no preemption existed for the highway signal.
- Langenweddingen level crossing disaster, in 1967 East Germany, fire also started on train by fuel in vehicle after collision resulting from driver's mistaken belief tracks were clear, killing 94 in the deadliest grade crossing accident ever.
- 2005 Glendale train crash, commuter train struck SUV parked on tracks at grade crossing
- 2009 Taconic State Parkway crash, also in Mount Pleasant, where counterintuitive behavior of van driver killed eight in her car and vehicle into which she crashed.

== Works cited ==
- "Highway-Railroad Grade Crossing Collision, Commerce Street, Valhalla, New York; February 3, 2015" (PDF). National Transportation Safety Board. July 25, 2017. pp. 18–19. Archived from the original (PDF) on July 21, 2024.
