= Walter Liedtke =

American art historian

- Born: August 28, 1945; Plainfield, New Jersey, U.S.
- Died: February 3, 2015 (aged 69); Valhalla, New York, U.S.
- Occupations: Art historian, writer, curator
- Years active: 1974–2015

Walter Arthur Liedtke, Jr. (August 28, 1945 – February 3, 2015) was an American art historian, writer and Curator of Dutch and Flemish Paintings at the Metropolitan Museum of Art. He was known as one of the world's leading scholars of Dutch and Flemish paintings. He died in the 2015 Metro-North Valhalla train crash.

== Early life ==
Liedtke was born in Plainfield, New Jersey, and grew up in Livingston, New Jersey. Liedtke studied Art History, receiving a Bachelor of Arts degree in 1967 from Rutgers University in New Brunswick, New Jersey, a Master of Arts degree in 1969 at Brown University in Providence, Rhode Island. He received a Doctorate at the Courtauld Institute of Art in London. Liedtke said that his interest in Dutch paintings began because he was focused on images as a child from hours and hours of watching a lot of TV. He described his aesthetic as that of having a focus on how he responded to visual patterns compared to a more typical perspective focused on story and narratives.

== Career ==
=== Academia ===
Liedtke planned on a career in academia. For two years Liedtke taught at the Florida State University, then at the University's villa in Florence. In 1974 he was working at the Courtauld Institute in London on his PhD dissertation, "Architectural painting in Delft, 1650–1675," in which he discussed work of Gerrit Houckgeest, Pieter Saenredam, Hendrick Cornelisz. van Vliet and Emmanuel de Witte. From 1975 till 1979 he joined the faculty at Ohio State University.

=== The Metropolitan Museum of Art ===
After receiving a Mellon Fellowship he began studying at The Metropolitan Museum of Art, where he was appointed in 1980 as curator and would spend the rest of his career. He organized numerous exhibitions, wrote seven books, including several on Rembrandt and Vermeer, and produced catalogues of the Museum's Dutch and Flemish paintings.

Liedtke served as a curator of European Paintings at the Metropolitan Museum of Art for thirty-five years. Liedtke specialized in the paintings of Vermeer and the Delft School. The 2001 Liedtke-curated show, "Vermeer and the Delft School" was said to be the most popular art exhibition that year, attracting 555,000 visitors during its three-month run.

At the time of his death he was preparing a catalogue of the museum's collection of Spanish paintings of the 15th to 18th century.

Most recently, he worked on "El Greco in New York," a collaborative project that was co-curated with Keith Christiansen, with the Hispanic Society of America and the Frick Collection held at the Metropolitan Museum of Art from November 4, 2014 to February 1, 2015.

== Personal life ==
Liedtke was married to Nancy Liedtke a math teacher, artist, and equestrienne. He commuted daily from the Metropolitan Museum of Art on the Upper East Side neighborhood of New York City to what he called "the countryside," Bedford Hills, New York in Westchester County. He said that he thought there was something "Dutch" about the way he lived: the idyllic countryside, his 100-year-old home, and his art collection, which he said was quintessentially Dutch in character.

=== Death ===
Along with five others, Liedtke died in the February 3, 2015 Metro-North crash, at the age of 69. Thomas Campbell, director of the Metropolitan Museum of Art, described him as "one of the most distinguished scholars of Dutch and Flemish painting in the world." Many in the art and museum community posted reflections and appreciation of Liedtke's work. Memorial statements were widespread, and were both local and international in scope.

== Honors ==
- 1993: Knight in the Order of Leopold by King Albert II of Belgium
- 2007: Officer in the Order of Orange-Nassau by Queen Beatrix of the Netherlands

== Works and publications ==
=== Monographs ===
- Liedtke, Walter A. Jr. Architectural Paintings in Delft: 1650–1675. A Thesis (PhD) – University of London (Courtauld Institute of Art), 1974. OCLC 272495491
- Liedtke, Walter A. Architectural Painting in Delft: Gerard Houckgeest, Hendrick Van Vliet, Emanuel De Witte. Doornspijk, the Netherlands: Davaco, 1982. ISBN 978-9-070-28811-2 OCLC 9554399
- Liedtke, Walter A., and Anthonis van Dyck. Antony Van Dyck. New York: Metropolitan Museum of Art, 1985. OCLC 475286414
- Bauman, Guy C., and Walter A. Liedtke. Flemish Paintings in America: A Survey of Early Netherlandish and Flemish Paintings in the Public Collections of North America. Antwerp: Fonds Mercator, 1992. ISBN 978-9-061-53231-6 OCLC 489445924
- Metropolitan Museum of Art (New York, N.Y.), and Walter A. Liedtke. Flemish Paintings in the Metropolitan Museum of Art. New York: The Museum, 1984. Published in association with the J. Paul Getty Trust. ISBN 978-0-870-99356-5 OCLC 9785292
- Liedtke, Walter A. The Royal Horse and Rider: Painting, Sculpture, and Horsemanship 1500–1800. New York: Abaris Books, a Woodner Foundation Company, in association with The Metropolitan Museum of Art, 1989. ISBN 978-0-898-35267-2 OCLC 507217109
- Brejon de Lavergnée, Arnauld, Barbara Brejon de Lavergnée, Katharine B. Baetjer, James David Draper, William M. Griswold, Walter A. Liedtke, Anne Norton, and Annie Scottez-De Wambrechies. Masterworks from the Musée Des Beaux-Arts, Lille. New York: Harry N. Abrams, 1992. ISBN 978-0-810-96417-4 OCLC 901055202
  - Masterworks from the Musée des Beaux-Arts, Lille at the Metropolitan Museum of Art – 1992–1993 exhibition catalog
- Liedtke, Walter, Pieter de Hooch, Carel Fabritius, Johannes Vermeer, and Gerard Houckgeest. A View of Delft: Vermeer and His Contemporaries. Zwolle: Waanders, 2000. ISBN 978-9-040-09490-3 OCLC 185854242
- Liedtke, Walter. 2000. "The Study of Dutch Art in America". Artibus Et Historiae / Istituto Internationale Per Le Ricerche Di Storia Dell'Arte (IRSA). 2, no. 41, 2000. pp. 207–220. ISSN 0391-9064 OCLC 886789750
- Plomp, Michiel, et al. Vermeer and the Delft School / Walter Liedtke. New York : The Metropolitan Museum of Art, 2001. ISBN 978-0-870-99973-4 OCLC 819761194
  - Vermeer and the Delft School at the Metropolitan Museum of Art – 2001 exhibition catalog
- Liedtke, Walter A. Dutch Paintings in the Metropolitan Museum of Art. New York: Metropolitan Museum of Art, 2007. ISBN 978-1-588-39273-2 OCLC 156784902
- Liedtke, Walter A., and Johannes Vermeer. Vermeer: The Complete Paintings. Ghent, Belgium: Ludion Press, 2008. ISBN 978-9-055-44742-8 OCLC 237890666
- Metropolitan Museum of Art (New York, N.Y.), and Liedtke, Walter A. The Milkmaid by Johannes Vermeer / Walter Liedtke. New York : The Metropolitan Museum of Art, 2009 OCLC 839735356
  - The Milkmaid by Johannes Vermeer at the Metropolitan Museum of Art – 2009 exhibition catalog

=== Multimedia ===
- Rose, Charlie, Philippe De Montebello, and Walter A. Liedtke. Charlie Rose. "Vermeer and the Delft School." Show No. 2926. New York: Charlie Rose, April 20, 2001. TV interview. OCLC 489460736
- Liedtke, Walter. "The Age of Rembrandt" on "The Age of Rembrandt: Dutch Paintings in The Metropolitan Museum of Art" exhibit (September 18, 2007 – January 6, 2008). Audio. Includes transcript.
- Rose, Charlie, Philippe De Montebello, and Walter A. Liedtke. Charlie Rose. "Rembrandt: Dutch Paintings." New York: Charlie Rose, December 11, 2007. TV interview. OCLC 720822361
- Liedtke, Walter. "Special Exhibition: Vermeer’s Masterpiece, The Milkmaid" on "Vermeer's Masterpiece The Milkmaid" exhibit (September 10, 2009 – November 29, 2009). Audio. Includes transcript.
- Liedtke, Walter. "Connections: Living with Vermeer." The Metropolitan Museum of Art, 2011. Multimedia presentation.
- Liedtke, Walter. "The Choice." on Aristotle with a Bust of Homer, 1653 by Rembrandt (Rembrandt van Rijn) (Dutch). 82nd&Fifth. The Metropolitan Museum of Art. 2013. Interactive audiovisual presentation.
