= Niles Pierce =

American bioengineer and mathematician

Niles A. Pierce is an American mathematician, bioengineer, and professor at the California Institute of Technology. He is a leading researcher in the fields of molecular programming and dynamic nucleic acid nanotechnology. His research is focused on kinetically controlled DNA and RNA self-assembly. Pierce is working on applications in bioimaging.

Pierce graduated as the Valedictorian of the Princeton University class of 1993 with a BSE in Mechanical & Aerospace Engineering. He then attended Oxford University as a Rhodes Scholar, an achievement repeated nine years later by his sister Lillian Pierce. He completed a DPhil in Applied Mathematics in 1997. He joined the faculty of the California Institute of Technology in 2000.

== Works ==
- Choi, Harry M. T.; Beck, Victor A.; Pierce, Niles A. (8 April 2014). "Next-Generation in Situ Hybridization Chain Reaction: Higher Gain, Lower Cost, Greater Durability". ACS Nano. 8 (5). American Chemical Society (ACS): 4284–4294. doi:10.1021/nn405717p. ISSN 1936-0851. PMC 4046802. PMID 24712299.
- Hochrein, Lisa M.; Schwarzkopf, Maayan; Shahgholi, Mona; Yin, Peng; Pierce, Niles A. (12 November 2013). "Conditional Dicer Substrate Formation via Shape and Sequence Transduction with Small Conditional RNAs". Journal of the American Chemical Society. 135 (46). American Chemical Society (ACS): 17322–17330. doi:10.1021/ja404676x. ISSN 0002-7863. PMC 3842090. PMID 24219616.
- Zadeh, Joseph N.; Wolfe, Brian R.; Pierce, Niles A. (17 August 2010). "Nucleic acid sequence design via efficient ensemble defect optimization". Journal of Computational Chemistry. 32 (3). Wiley: 439–452. doi:10.1002/jcc.21633. ISSN 0192-8651. PMID 20717905. S2CID 1803200.
- Zadeh, Joseph N.; Steenberg, Conrad D.; Bois, Justin S.; Wolfe, Brian R.; Pierce, Marshall B.; Khan, Asif R.; Dirks, Robert M.; Pierce, Niles A. (17 November 2010). "NUPACK: Analysis and design of nucleic acid systems". Journal of Computational Chemistry. 32 (1). Wiley: 170–173. doi:10.1002/jcc.21596. ISSN 0192-8651. PMID 20645303. S2CID 33709556.
- Choi, Harry M T; Chang, Joann Y; Trinh, Le A; Padilla, Jennifer E; Fraser, Scott E; Pierce, Niles A (31 October 2010). "Programmable in situ amplification for multiplexed imaging of mRNA expression". Nature Biotechnology. 28 (11). Springer Science and Business Media LLC: 1208–1212. doi:10.1038/nbt.1692. ISSN 1087-0156. PMC 3058322. PMID 21037591.
- Yin, Peng; Choi, Harry M. T.; Calvert, Colby R.; Pierce, Niles A. (2008). "Programming biomolecular self-assembly pathways". Nature. 451 (7176). Springer Science and Business Media LLC: 318–322. Bibcode:2008Natur.451..318Y. doi:10.1038/nature06451. ISSN 0028-0836. PMID 18202654. S2CID 4354536.
- Dirks, Robert M.; Bois, Justin S.; Schaeffer, Joseph M.; Winfree, Erik; Pierce, Niles A. (2007). "Thermodynamic Analysis of Interacting Nucleic Acid Strands". SIAM Review. 49 (1). Society for Industrial & Applied Mathematics (SIAM): 65–88. Bibcode:2007SIAMR..49...65D. doi:10.1137/060651100. ISSN 0036-1445.
- Dirks, Robert M.; Pierce, Niles A. (18 October 2004). "Triggered amplification by hybridization chain reaction". Proceedings of the National Academy of Sciences. 101 (43): 15275–15278. doi:10.1073/pnas.0407024101. ISSN 0027-8424. PMC 524468. PMID 15492210.
- Shin, Jong-Shik; Pierce, Niles A. (17 August 2004). "A Synthetic DNA Walker for Molecular Transport". Journal of the American Chemical Society. 126 (35). American Chemical Society (ACS): 10834–10835. doi:10.1021/ja047543j. ISSN 0002-7863. PMID 15339155.

== Resources ==
- NUPACK is a growing software suite for the analysis and design of nucleic acid structures, devices, and systems.
- Molecular Technologies develops and supports programmable molecular technologies for reading out and regulating the state of endogenous biological circuitry.

== Startup Company ==
- Molecular Instruments, Inc. designs and synthesizes molecular kits for multiplexed quantitative bioimaging in academic research, drug development, and clinical diagnostics.
