= Jeremy Hartnett =

American archaeologist

Jeremy Hartnett is an American classicist and scholar of the archaeology and social life of Ancient Rome, Pompeii, Ostia, and Herculaneum. He is the Anne and Andrew T. Ford Professor of the Liberal Arts at Wabash College, specializing in the ancient world's urban history and street life. In 2018, he won the American Historical Association's James Henry Breasted Prize for his book The Roman Street: Urban Life and Society in Pompeii, Herculaneum, and Rome.
