= David Broecker =

American life sciences executive

David A. Broecker
- Born: 1961 (age 64–65)
- Education: Wabash College (B.A., 1983); Massachusetts Institute of Technology (M.S., 1985); University of Chicago (MBA, 1989)
- Occupation: Biotechnology executive
- Years active: 1985–2017
- Known for: President and CEO of Alkermes and Indiana Biosciences Research Institute

David Andrew Broecker (born 1961) is an American life sciences executive. He was president and CEO of Alkermes from 2007 to 2009 and was appointed president and CEO of the Indiana Biosciences Research Institute in 2015. He left that position in 2017.

== Education and career ==
Broecker graduated from Carmel High School, where he led their football team to an undefeated season and the 1978 state 3A championship, tying the Indiana High School Athletic Association record for most touchdown passes in a championship game. He then attended Wabash College, where he majored in chemistry and led the Wabash Little Giants football team to an undefeated season in 1982. Broecker won the 1982 National Football Foundation National Scholar-Athlete Award and was inducted into the Wabash College Athletic Hall of Fame twice: as an individual in 1992, and as part of the team he led in 2013.

After graduating summa cum laude and Phi Beta Kappa from Wabash College in 1983, he earned a M.S. degree in chemical engineering from the Massachusetts Institute of Technology in 1985. In 1989 he earned a Master of Business Administration from University of Chicago.

In 1985, Broecker joined Eli Lilly and Company, starting in the medical device and diagnostics division that later became Guidant. He was then involved in development of Ceclor, Prozac, and Zyprexa, overseeing manufacturing operations in Germany and Ireland. In 2001, he was appointed as chief operating officer of Alkermes, later serving as both president and CEO. He then held executive positions at BioCritica, ApeX Therapeutics, DiaCarta, and Harlan Laboratories. He founded Zorion Medical in 2010. He was elected a Trustee of Wabash College in 2009.

In 2015, Broecker was appointed President and CEO of the Indiana Biosciences Research Institute (IBRI). In 2016, he announced the IBRI would focus on targeting diabetes, metabolic disease, and poor nutrition. In 2016, the IBRI secured $100 million in grants under his leadership. Broecker was tasked with finding a new location for the IBRI, eventually getting approval for a site to be called 16 Tech. In 2016, Broecker announced that the IBRI had hired Rainer Fischer as Chief Scientific Officer. In 2017, Broecker announced that Indiana Governor Eric Holcomb reaffirmed the commitment to the IBRI made in 2013 by his predecessor Mike Pence.

In September 2018, Broecker was appointed chief innovation and collaboration officer of the Purdue Research Foundation.
