= Indiana Biosciences Research Institute =

Nonprofit organization in Indianapolis, Indiana, US

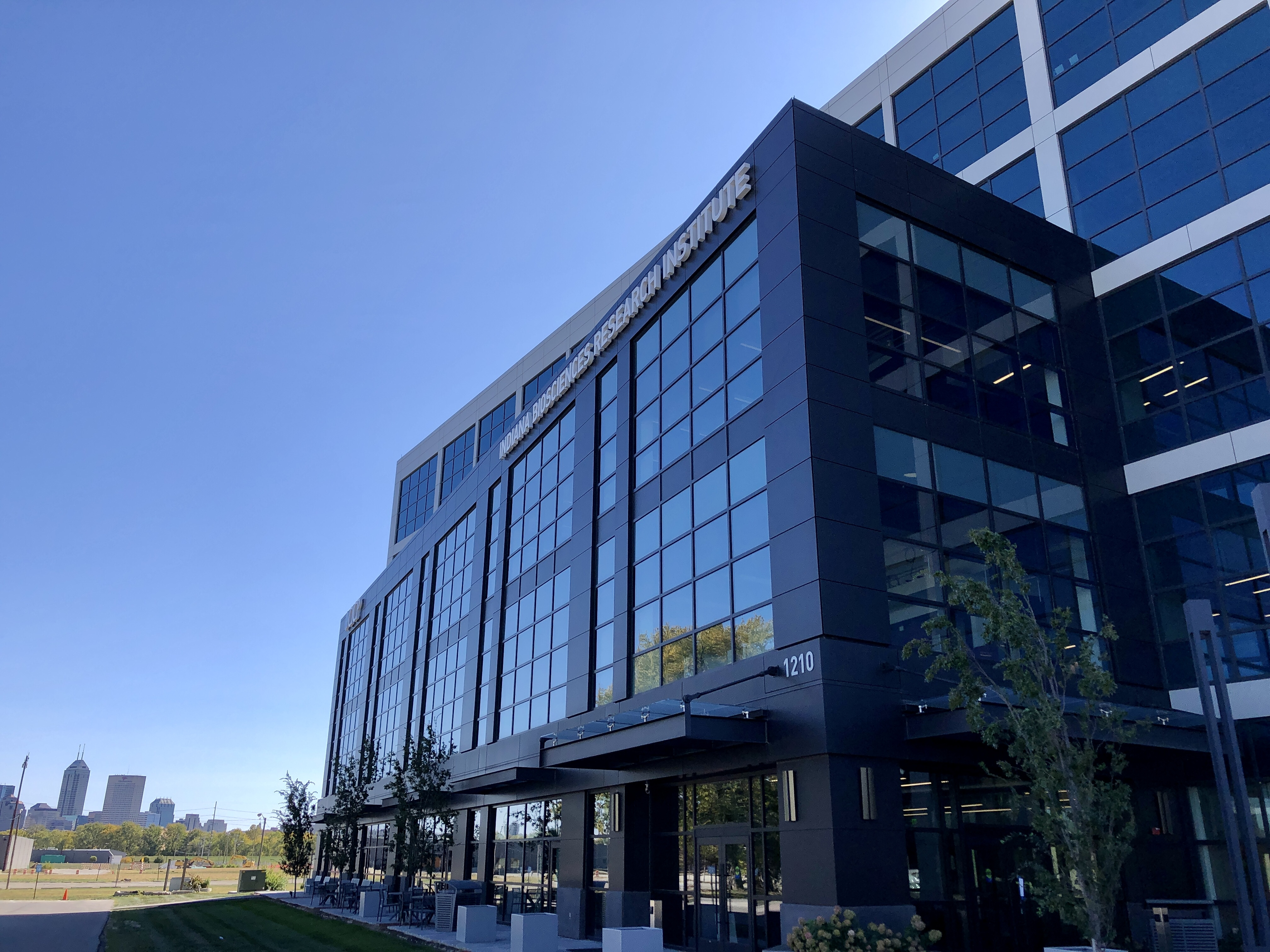
- Innovation Building 1 at 16 Tech Innovation District
- Formation: May 1, 2013; 13 years ago
- Type: Research Institute
- Headquarters: Indianapolis, Indiana, U.S.
- Region served: Indiana
- Staff: 100
- Website: https://www.indianabiosciences.org

The Indiana Biosciences Research Institute (IBRI) is an American nonprofit translational research organization headquartered in Indianapolis, Indiana, United States within the 16 Tech Innovation District. The IBRI is the nation's first industry-led collaborative life sciences research institute. Its primary focus is on better understanding the pathogenesis of type 1 and type 2 diabetes to translate this knowledge into novel therapies, while also expanding into other metabolic diseases that share common systems and pathways.

== History ==
In 2012, pharmaceutical executive John C. Lechleiter from Eli Lilly & Company initially proposed the IBRI. In 2013, Indiana governor Mike Pence announced the formation of the IBRI. Pence later worked with life sciences leaders to secure $25 million in startup funds from the state.

In 2015, the IBRI hired David Broecker as CEO. In late 2015, the Indianapolis City-County Council approved $75 million to build a technology park called 16 Tech.

In February 2016, IBRI, along with Governor Mike Pence, announced $100 million in new funding from the Lily Endownment Inc. and the Eli Lilly and Company Foundation. Later that year, in October, the IBRI hired Rainer Fischer as Chief Scientific Officer.

In 2017, Governor Eric Holcomb reaffirmed the commitment made by his predecessor Mike Pence. In August of that same year, Innovation Officer Rainer Fischer was named CEO. He stepped down in 2019. In September 2020, Alan Palkowitz was named president and CEO of the IBRI.

In September 2024, IBRI and Indiana University announced the creation of a joint center of excellence. The new center, the Joint Center of Excellence for Point of Care, will advance innovation and treatment in four disease areas: diabetes and metabolism, pediatric rare diseases, cancer, and Alzheimer's disease.

== Leadership ==
Appointees to the IBRI's Board of Directors include:

- Robert Bernhard, University of Notre Dame
- Daniel Evans Jr., Indiana University Health
- Tatiana Foroud, Indiana University School of Medicine
- Jay Hess, Indiana University
- David Ingram, Indiana University Health
- Cris Johnston, Indiana Office of Management and Budget
- John Lechleiter, Eli Lilly & Company
- Patricia Martin, BioCrossroads, Inc.
- Theresa Mayer, Purdue University
- Alan Palkowitz, IBRI
- Dan Peterson, Cook Group
- Aaron Schacht, BiomEdit, LLC
- Wendy Srnic, Corteva
